= 2025 NBR strike =

2025 strike by NBR officials in Bangladesh

2025 National Board of Revenue strike
- Part of the Aftermath of the July Uprising
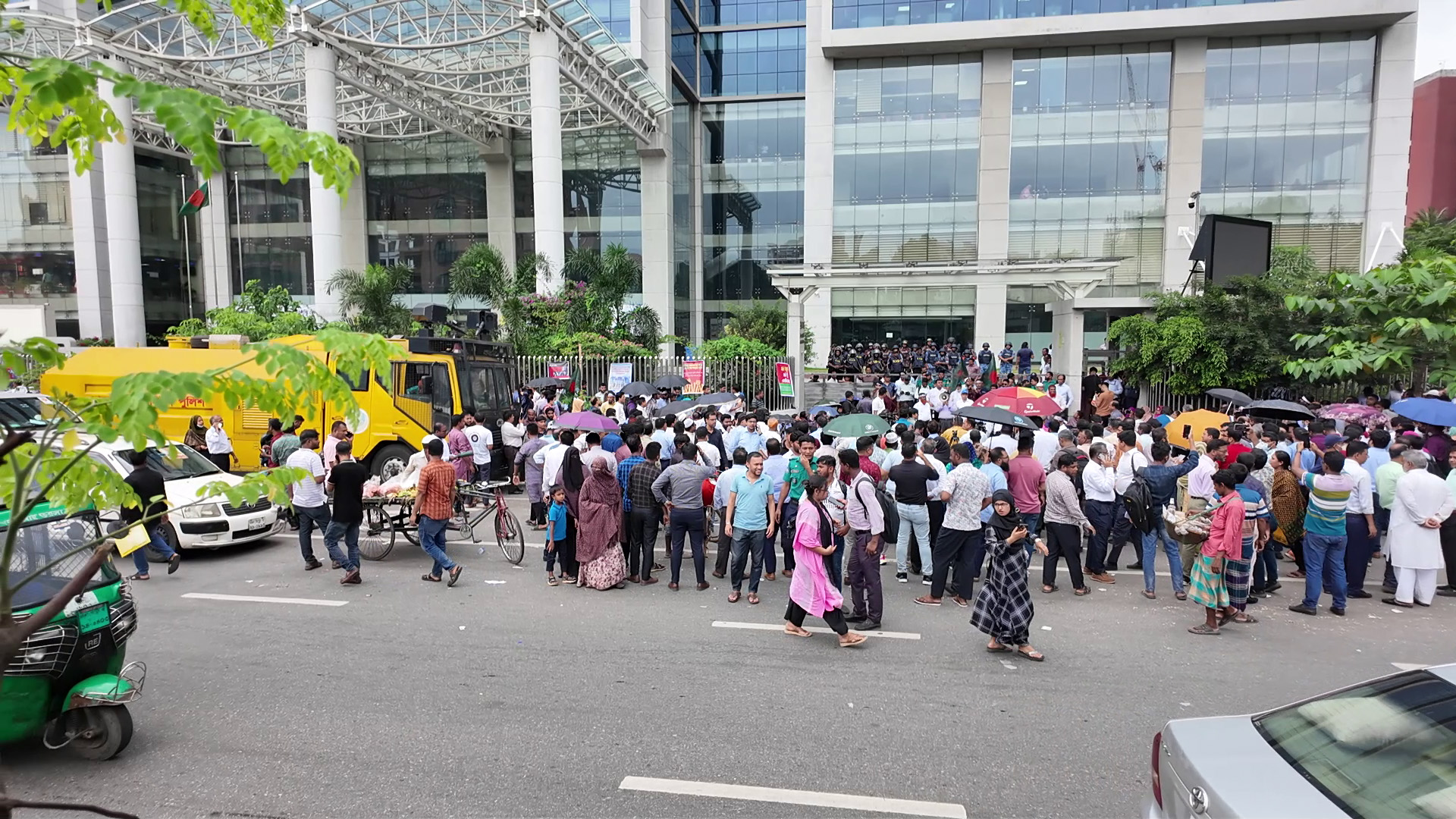
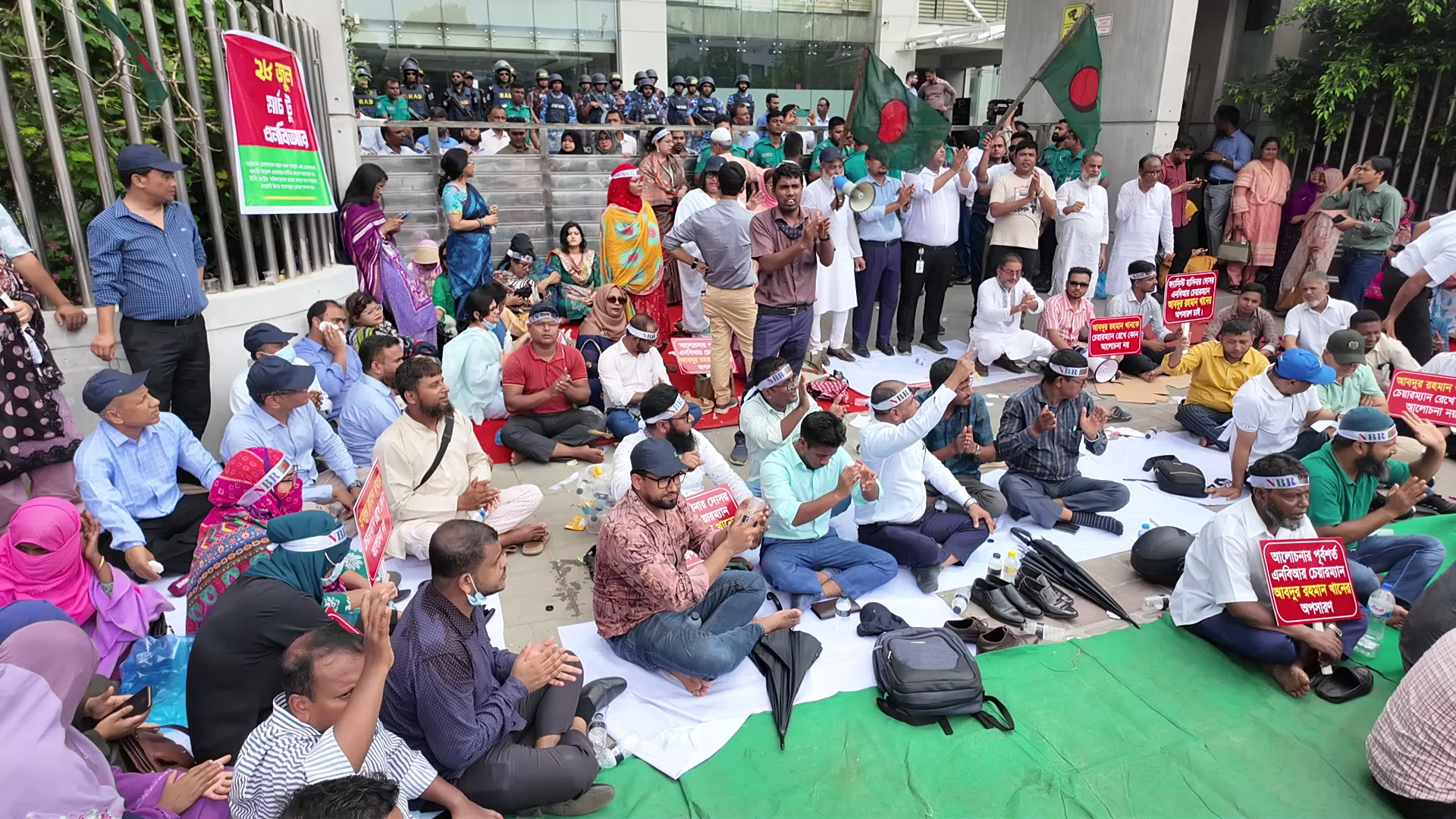
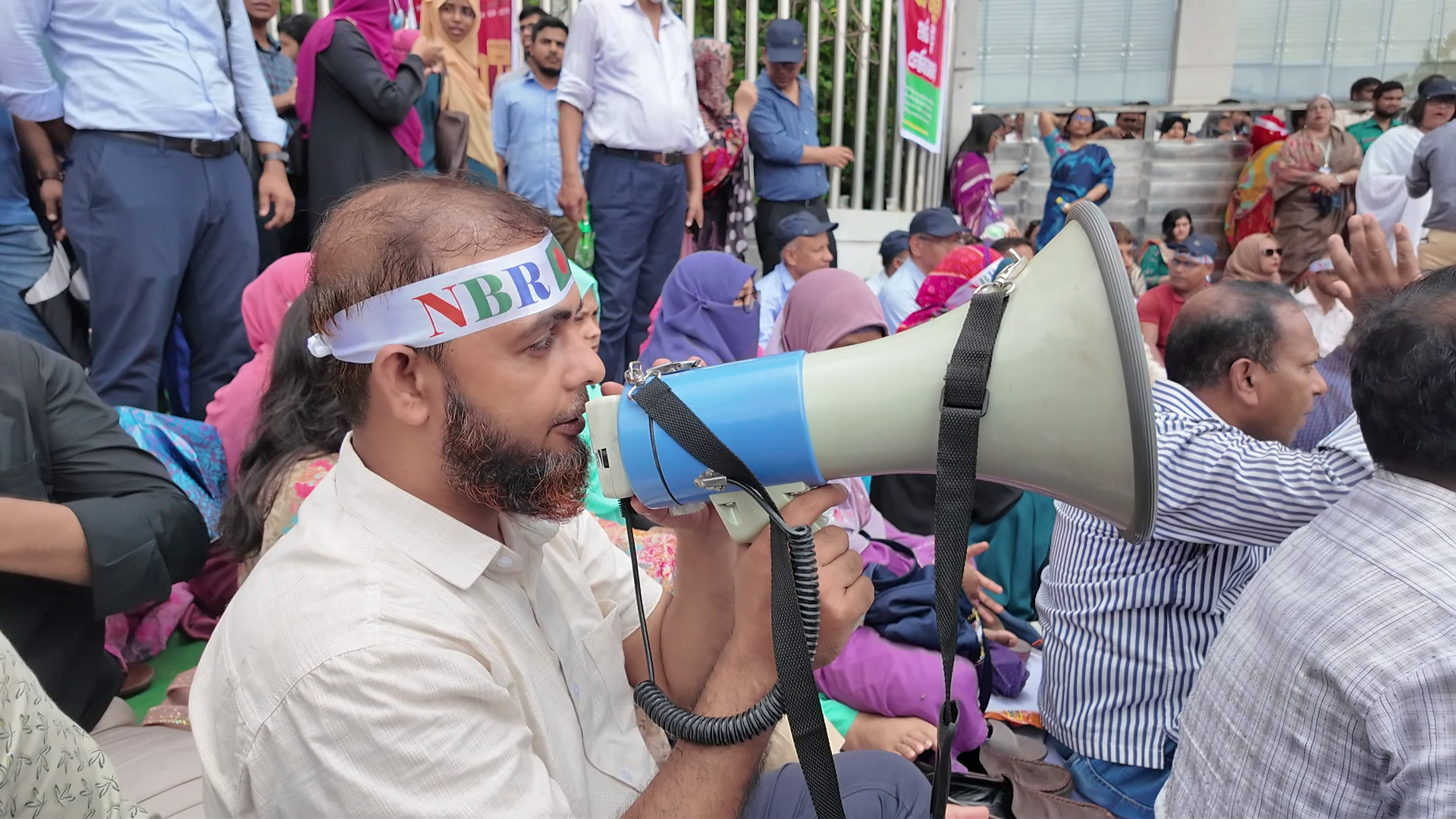
- Officials and employees blocking the revenue building in Agargaon, Dhaka. Sit-in procession by employees blocking the revenue building. An employee protester speaking through a megaphone.
- Date: May–June 2025
- Location: Bangladesh
- Caused by: Dissolution of NBR via ordinance
- Goals: Withdrawal of May ordinance; Resignation of NBR chairman
- Methods: Strike • office closures • suspension of customs services
- Result: Suppressed: Strike ended after government declared NBR jobs essential services

Parties
NBR Reform Unity Council	Government of Bangladesh

Lead figures
Sehela Siddiqa	Salehuddin Ahmed; Md Abdur Rahman Khan

2025 National Board of Revenue strike refers to a sporadic nationwide protest and work stoppage by officials of the National Board of Revenue (NBR) in Bangladesh, which took place in May and June 2025, leading to the stoppage of revenue collection and all trade at international ports.

Following the end of the strike, the Government began a clampdown on protest leaders, forcing several senior officials into retirement and launching corruption investigations.

== Background ==
On 5 August 2024, Prime Minister Sheikh Hasina resigned and went to India during the non-cooperation movement, and an interim government took over. Chief Adviser Muhammad Yunus initiated a series of reforms in Bangladesh.

At midnight on 12 May 2025, the government of Bangladesh issued an ordinance dissolving the National Board of Revenue and the Internal Resources Division. These entities were to be replaced by a new Revenue Policy Division and Revenue Management Division as part of broader fiscal and administrative reforms. The International Monetary Fund backed the reform. The move triggered dissatisfaction among NBR officials, who viewed the restructuring as abrupt and lacking consultation. The officials were suspicious of the ordinance saying "suitably qualified" will head the policy division without stating that prior experience in the revenue sector will be required.

Tax officials had protested the reforms throughout June through programs such as a five-hour pen-down strike. The government had deployed many personnel from the Bangladesh Army, Bangladesh Police, Rapid Action Battalion, and the Border Guard Bangladesh around the headquarters of the National Board of Revenue. The Dhaka Metropolitan Police issued a ban on gatherings near the headquarters of the National Board of Revenue. The police prevented Council President Hasan Muhammad Tarek Rikabdar from entering his office on 27 June. The Council sought the intervention of Chief Adviser Muhammad Yunus.

== History ==
On 24 May 2025, the NBR Reform Unity Council announced a complete strike. They had organized a pen-down strike on 14 May but suspended all strike activities on 19 May after Chief Adviser Muhammad Yunus initiated the process for dialogue.

The strike was organised by the NBR Reform Unity Council in response to a government ordinance issued in May 2025 that dissolved the NBR and the Internal Resources Division, replacing them with new structures. Protesters also demanded the resignation of the NBR chairman, Abdur Rahman Khan. The officials had accused the chairman of working for a vested interest group.

The strike resulted in the suspension of all customs, VAT, and income tax services nationwide, except for those related to international passenger movement. Port operations, particularly at the Chattogram Customs House, were halted, resulting in a disruption of trade activities valued at approximately Tk 2,500 crore daily, according to business leaders.

The government responded by declaring all NBR-related jobs, including those at customs houses, inland container depots (ICDs), and bond commissionerates, as essential services under the Essential Services (Maintenance) Act, 1952, and the Essential Services (Second) Ordinance, 1958. Officials were warned of legal consequences if they failed to return to work. Business leaders had also worked behind the scenes to end the strike.

The Finance Adviser to the interim government, Salehuddin Ahmed, declined to meet protesting officers and accused them of obstructing vital revenue reforms. The government characterized the strike as a pre-planned attempt to sabotage the reform process and undermine national interests. It emphasized that dialogue had been offered but was rejected by the protesters.

Following the government's declaration and warning, the NBR Reform Unity Council announced the withdrawal of the strike on the night of 29 June. Export operations at Chattogram Port resumed that evening, with full customs services expected to return to normal by the following day.

=== Impact ===
The strike resulted in the complete suspension of customs clearance and tax services nationwide, affecting businesses that rely on import-export operations. Business organisations, including top exporters and industry associations, expressed alarm at the economic impact and called for immediate resolution.

== Aftermath ==
Following the end of the strike, the government reiterated its commitment to revenue reform and warned against future disruptions. As of early July 2025, services at ports and tax offices had largely resumed, though discussions on institutional reform continued within government circles. The government promised to amend the ordinance while tax officials are continuing to ask it to be repealed. The strike caused a shortfall in revenue collection. President of the Bangladesh Knitwear Manufacturers and Exporters Association, Fazlee Shamim Ehsan, wrote to both sides calling for a de-escalation of the situation.

=== Government response ===
The government ended the strike by declaring revenue collection and customs essential services, which must continue during strikes.

The Anti-Corruption Commission began investigations against senior leaders of the strike, including the president of the NBR Reform Unity Council, Mohammad Tarek Rikabder. The commission also began investigations against Sehela Siddiqua, general secretary of the NBR Reform Unity Council. In total, the commission began an investigation against 11 officials of the National Board of Revenue, creating concern and panic among tax officials.

On 2 July, the government sent four senior officials of the National Board of Revenue on forced retirement and suspended the commissioner of the Chittagong Custom House.

== See also ==
- Reform Commissions of Bangladesh
- Economy of Bangladesh
- Chittagong Port
- Interim government of Muhammad Yunus
