= M Syeduzzaman =

Bangladeshi politician (born 1993)

- এম সাইদুজ্জামান
- Born: 27 October 1933 (age 92)
- Education: University of Dhaka; Williams College

M Syeduzzaman (born 27 October 1933) is a former finance secretary and member of the Central Committee of Bangladesh Krishak Sramik Awami League. He is the chairperson of Credit Rating Agency of Bangladesh Limited. He is a member of the Trustee Board of the Centre for Policy Dialogue.

== Early life and education ==
Syeduzzaman completed his HSC from Dhaka College and master's in physics from the University of Dhaka in 1956. He completed his second master's from Williams College in development economics in 1963.

== Career ==
From 1973 to 1976, Syeduzzaman was the secretary at the Ministry of Planning and the Planning Commission. He was also the Secretary at the Economic Relations Division.

From 1976 to 1977, Syeduzzaman was the secretary at the Ministry of Finance. During that time he also served in the Board of Governors of the Bangladesh Agricultural Research Institute and the Bangladesh Rice Research Institute.

Syeduzzaman worked at the World Bank from 1977 to 1982 as external director in the section for Bangladesh, Bhutan, India, and Sri Lanka.

Syeduzzaman again served as the Secretary at the Ministry of Finance from 1982 to 1983. From 1984 to 1985, he was the chairperson of the Islamic Development Bank board of governors.

From January 1984 to December 1987, Syeduzzaman worked as the Principal Finance Secretary and Advisor to the President of Bangladesh, Hussain Mohammad Ershad. He held the rank of a cabinet minister in charge of Ministry of Finance and the Planning Ministry. He was a Member of the Board of Trustees of the International Food Policy Research Institute from 1986 to 1993.

From 1999 to 2008, Syeduzzaman was the chairperson of Bank Asia Limited. From 2002 to 2008, he was the chairperson of the Bangladesh Rice Foundation.
