= Office of the Controller General of Accounts =

- হিসাব মহানিয়ন্ত্রকের কার্যালয়

Agency overview
- Jurisdiction: Government of Bangladesh
- Headquarters: Segunbagicha, Dhaka, Bangladesh
- Parent department: Ministry of Finance
- Website: cga.gov.bd

The Office of the Controller General of Accounts (Bengali: হিসাব মহানিয়ন্ত্রকের কার্যালয়, CGA Office) is an autonomous government agency responsible for compilation and consolidation of government accounts. It is headquartered in Segunbagicha, Dhaka, Bangladesh.

== History ==
The Office of the Controller General of Accounts was established in 1985 through an office memo of the Finance Division under the Ministry of Finance. Before then it was known as the Office of the Accountant General which was established in 1947. It monitors the collection of taxes by the National Board of Revenue.

The CGA Office collaborates with the Office of the Comptroller and Auditor General of Bangladesh (OCAG) and formerly worked under it. Through a Finance Division memo dated 17 June 2002, the Ministry of Finance assumed direct control over the CGA Office.

A study by Transparency International Bangladesh covering the period from September 2010 to March 2012 identified 23 specific areas of corruption in the CGA Office. Its findings were based on nearly 150 primary responses.
