= Interim government of Muhammad Yunus =

Period of the Government of Bangladesh from 2024 to 2026

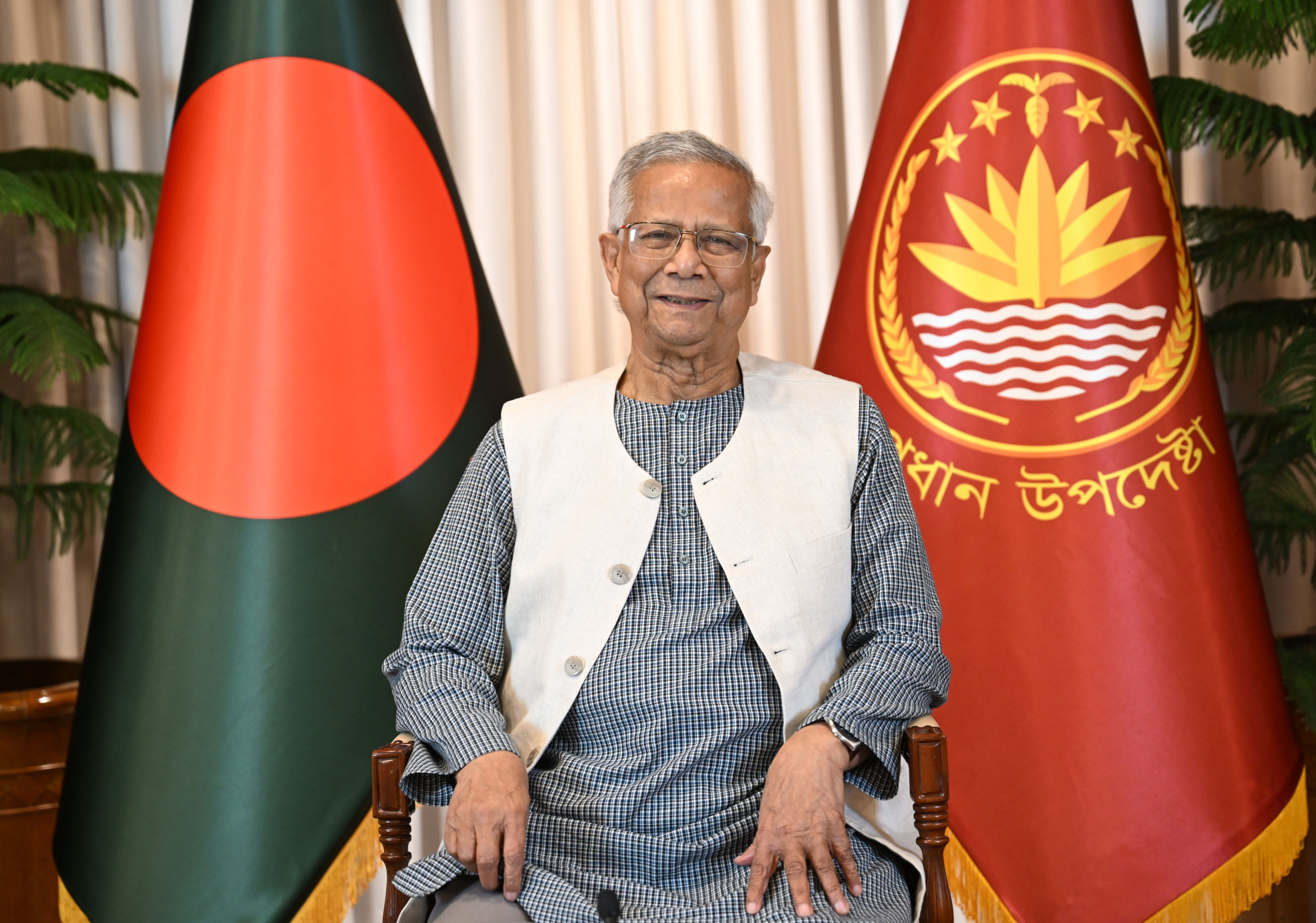
- Yunus in 2026
- Interim government of Muhammad Yunus; 8 August 2024 – 17 February 2026
- President: Mohammed Shahabuddin
- Premier: Muhammad Yunus
- Cabinet: Yunus ministry
- Party: Independent
- Nominated by: Students Against Discrimination
- Appointed by: Mohammed Shahabuddin
- Seat: Jamuna State Guest House

The leadership of Muhammad Yunus began on 8 August 2024 when he was sworn in as the Chief Adviser of Bangladesh by President Mohammed Shahabuddin. In August 2024, after the Resignation of Sheikh Hasina as prime minister and her departure to India following the July Uprising, the key coordinators of the Students Against Discrimination announced that Yunus would be Chief Adviser of the Interim government of Bangladesh. The main pledge of the interim government is to forge consensus about and implement fundamental reforms that are required to hold a free and fair general election and constitutional referendum on the July Charter alongside the election on 12 February 2026.

While the interim government initiated significant reform measures, substantial challenges persist in areas such as politics, the economy, and institutional accountability as reported by Transparency International Bangladesh (TIB). Systemic issues in governance and corruption remain largely unaddressed, prompting concerns that this may undermine the democratic aspirations of the uprising. According to the Ain o Salish Kendra, the interim government failed to fulfill the public desires following the uprising.

In the 2024–2025 fiscal year, Bangladesh registered an annual GDP growth rate of 3.49%, down substantially from immediate prior fiscal periods, representing a period of stagnation during the tenure of the interim government. Muhammad Yunus granted a number institutions affiliated with him, including Grameen-related organizations in substantial tax relief.

A concerns regarding the detention of political opponents were also raised in the United Kingdom Parliament. Early Day Motion 64866 stated that former Members of Parliament, journalists and judges had been imprisoned without charge for extended periods and expressed concern about alleged human rights abuses by state institutions. The motion called on the interim government to respect the rights of minorities and ensure adherence to due process and judicial safeguards.

== Background ==
On 5 August 2024, General Waker-uz-Zaman, the Chief of the Army Staff, handed the resignation of Prime Minister Sheikh Hasina to President Mohammed Shahabuddin following the uprising. The President have immediately started the process of meeting with political leaders, key coordinators of the protest and civil society members from around the country to discuss the formation of an interim government.

Amidst these deliberations, the student representatives who had been instrumental in the uprising expressed strong opposition to a military-led administration and nominated Muhammad Yunus, a Nobel laureate and renowned advocate for poverty alleviation and democratic governance with a global reputation, perceived neutrality and widespread acceptability, to serve as Chief Adviser of the interim government. After discussions involving the President, military officials, and student representatives, Yunus was appointed as interim leader with hopes that his leadership would restore democratic governance after years of political turmoil and authoritarianism. This was followed by the dissolvement of the parliament on 6 August 2024 by the President Mohammed Shahabuddin.

While the Constitution of Bangladesh has not provided for an interim government since 2011, the government is deemed legitimate due to the doctrine of necessity. Bangladeshi courts have taken the line that Hasina's resignation created a situation for which there was no constitutional remedy. Not only does the Bangladeshi legal system no longer account for transfers of power, but there was an urgent need to oversee state affairs.

== Inauguration ==
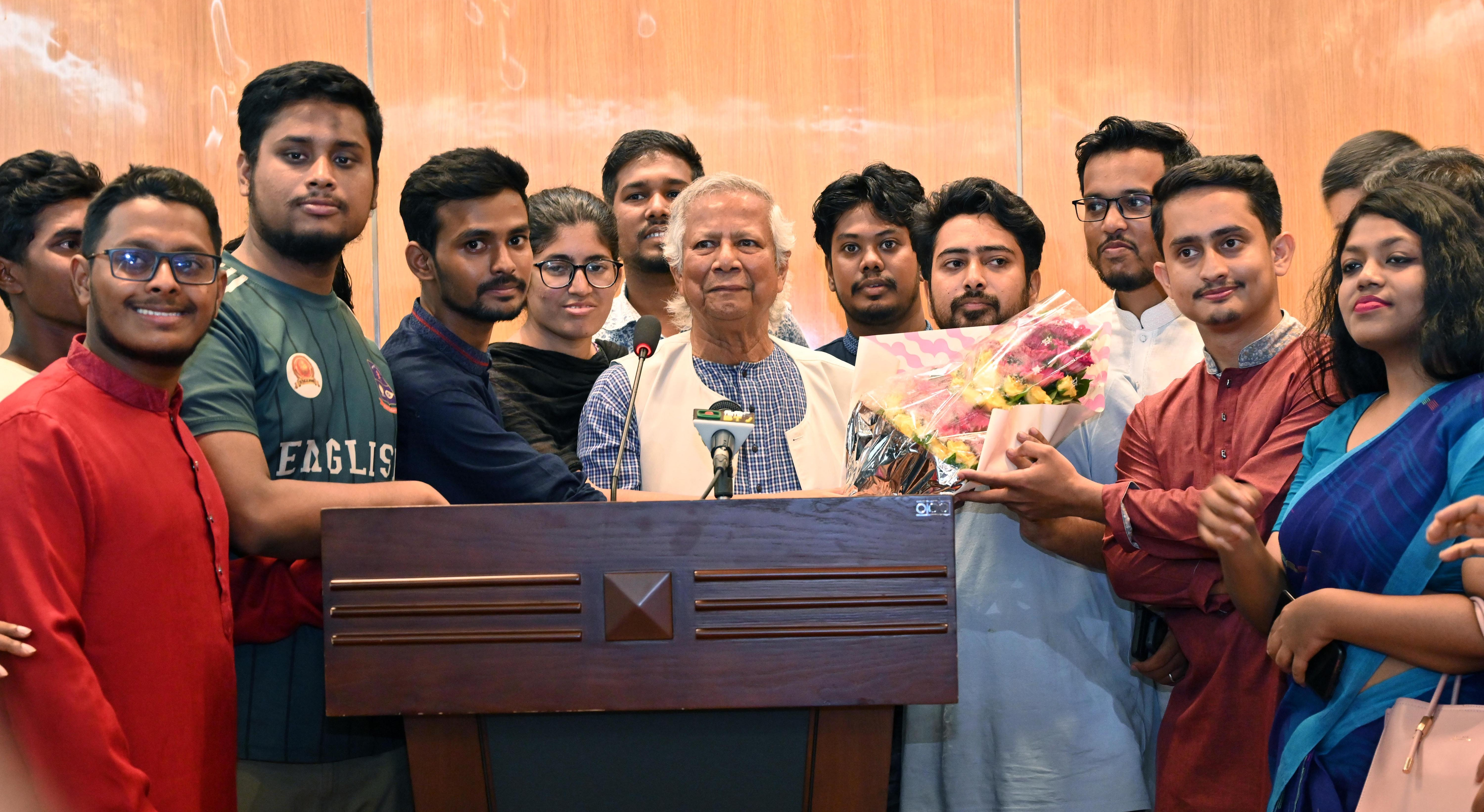
Yunus received by the Students Against Discrimination coordinators upon his arrival in Bangladesh on 8 August 2024.

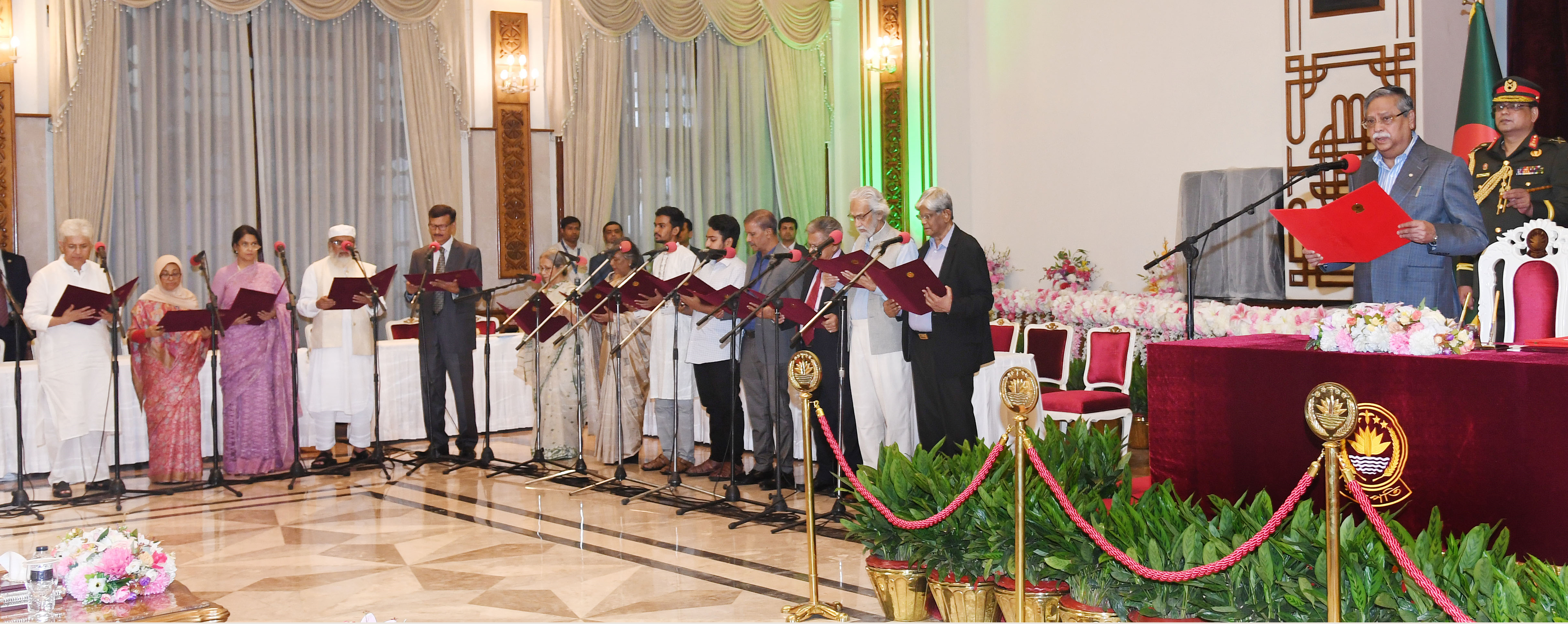
President Shahabuddin administers the oath to the advisors of Yunus's interim government.

Muhammad Yunus was sworn in as the Chief Adviser of Bangladesh in a ceremony at the Bangabhaban on 8 August 2024. President of Bangladesh Mohammed Shahabuddin administered the oath ceremony. Foreign diplomats, civil society members, top businessmen and members of the former opposition party and other guests attended the state ceremony. Yunus and the President signed the oath documents of the office.

== Domestic affairs ==
Advisory council meeting under the chairmanship of Muhammad Yunus on 12 September 2024.

On 9 August 2024, Yunus visited injured people at Dhaka Medical College Hospital. On 10 August 2024, he also visited the home and family members of Abu Sayed and paid respects to Sayed's grave in Rangpur. On 13 August, he visited the Dhakeshwari National Temple, the main place of worship for the Hindu minority in the capital city of Dhaka to meet the leaders of the Hindu community and denounced the post-resignation attacks on Hindus and other religious and ethnic minorities.

As head of government, Yunus delivered his first address to the nation on 25 August 2024. He outlined the proposed reforms in his half-hour speech. In the speech, he sought for constitutional and electoral reforms and promised to reform the country's economy, education, health, human rights, election system, legal system etc. in many other areas. On 11 September, Muhammad Yunus announced 6 commissions to fulfill the interim government's intentions to reform the electoral system, police administration, judiciary and public administration in Bangladesh alongside strengthening anti-corruption measures and amending the constitution avert from the previous authoritarian regime.

Hasina regime's violent crackdown included the use of tear gas, live ammunition, and mass arrests, resulting in over 1,000 deaths and thousands of detentions within three weeks during the July Uprising. Yunus later claimed that as many as 1,500 people were killed and up to 3,500 forcibly abducted during Hasina's 16-year rule. He pledged investigations into these alleged violations and enforced disappearances.

Almost immediately after the transition of power, the main opposition in the country demanded elections. However, the law, justice and parliamentary affairs adviser to the government, Asif Nazrul, said that the incumbent would "remain in power as long as necessary". for the implementation of reforms. The Yunus government also lifted the ban on the Jamaat-e-Islami as an organization that had been placed by the Hasina government at the peak of the anti-government protests.

On 17 September, July Shaheed Smrity Foundation was launched to support the families of those who were killed or injured in the uprising. 1 billion Bangladeshi taka was donated from the relief fund of the chief adviser.

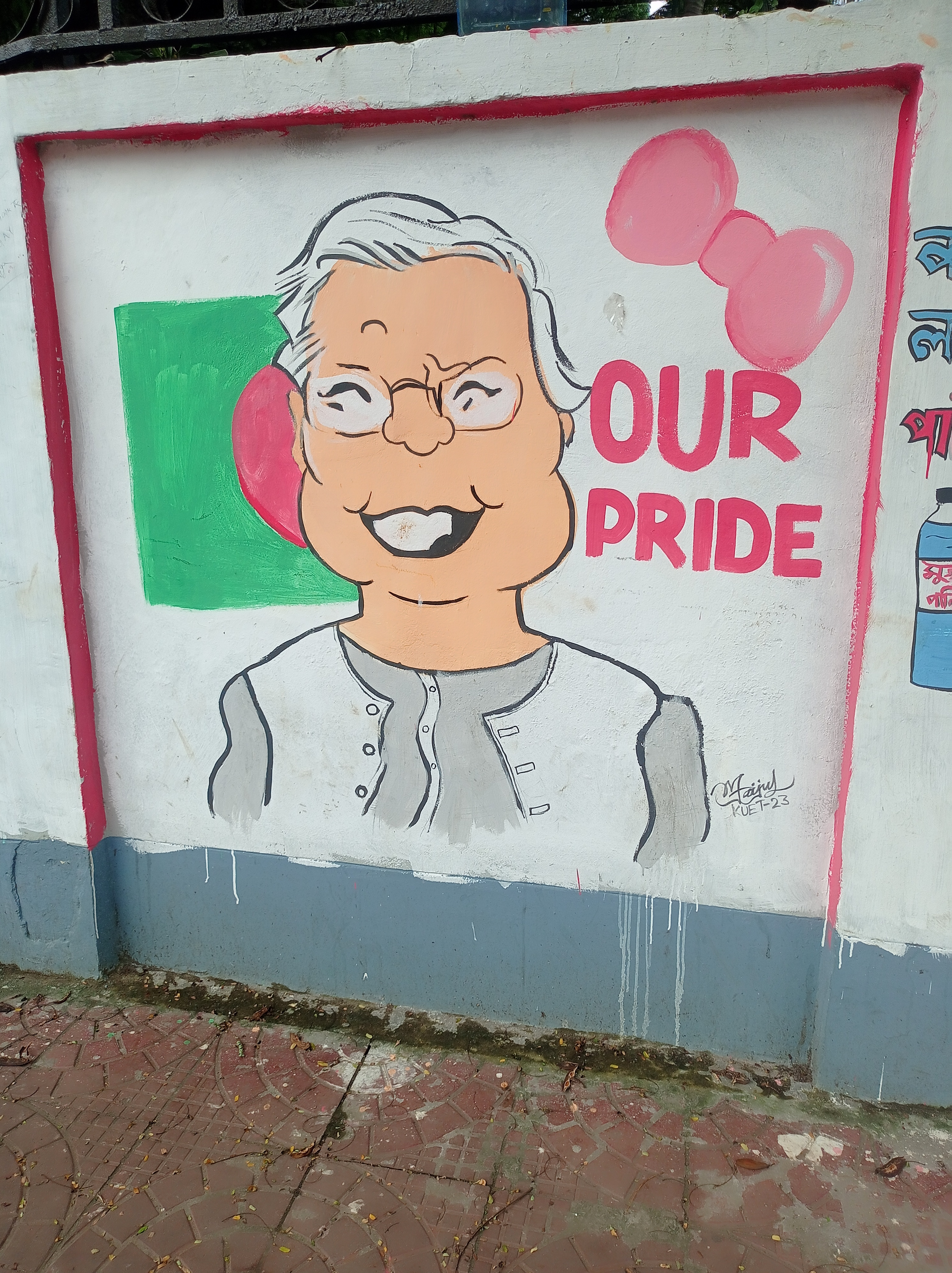
Graffiti drawn by the students following the uprising featuring Chief Adviser Muhammad Yunus.

In February 2025, following a widespread outburst of violence in the aftermath of Demolition of Dhanmondi 32, the administration launched Operation Devil Hunt to quell the violence. On its first day, 1,308 people were arrested.

In April 2025, after a massive demonstration by the National Citizen Party, citizens & other political parties like the Hefazat-e-Islam Bangladesh, the government banned the Awami League as an organization under the anti-terrorism act.

In May 2025, a Women's Affairs Reform Commission set by the government proposed granting equal rights to women regarding property inheritance, against which Islamists organised massive demonstrations.

In May 2025, the Yunus administration faced large-scale protests from civil servants over a government ordinance that amended the Public Service Act, 2018, which empowers the government to forcibly retire civil servants without any enquiry over the slightest accusations of indiscipline, a law that was in place during the presidency of Ziaur Rahman. On that very same month, primary teachers of government schools across the nation went on a strike demanding increase in wages.

The National Consensus Commission was established by the Yunus administration to overview consensus among political parties over the state reforms, engaged in dialogue with various parties for several months. In July 2025, the administration mulled about introducing term limits by restricting a person from holding the prime ministerial position for more than 10 years. The NCP & Jamaat-e-Islami agreed, but the BNP (whose leader Khaleda Zia had already served as prime minister from 1991 to 1996 & 2001 to 2006) & the Communist Party of Bangladesh opposed it. The BNP later agreed to support the interim government's steps regarding term limits on the condition that plans to create a National Constitutional Council be shelved. The BNP had also opposed the Yunus administration's plans to introduce proportional representation. As the discussion concludes, concerns raised over disagreements among political parties regarding key reform proposals and the finalisation of the July Charter. However, the deadline for finalising the charter approaching on 31 July, reports indicate that significant differences remain unresolved. Observers warned that failure to reach consensus may hinder progress on broader political and governance reforms associated with the July Uprising.

Clashes broke out between demonstrating students and police on 22 July 2025 in a protest rally demanding publication of the names of those who died in the 2025 Dhaka fighter jet crash, compensation for the victims and immediate halt over the use of outdated military equipment.

On 5 August 2025, Yunus said in a televised broadcast that he would write to the Bangladesh Election Commission to request the general election be held in February 2026 before Ramadan, which will begin as early as 18 February.

In October 2025, the interim government officially patronised multiple cultural events centering the death anniversary of the celebrated Baul mystic Lalon at the Kumarkhali Upazila where his mazar is located.

== Economic affairs ==
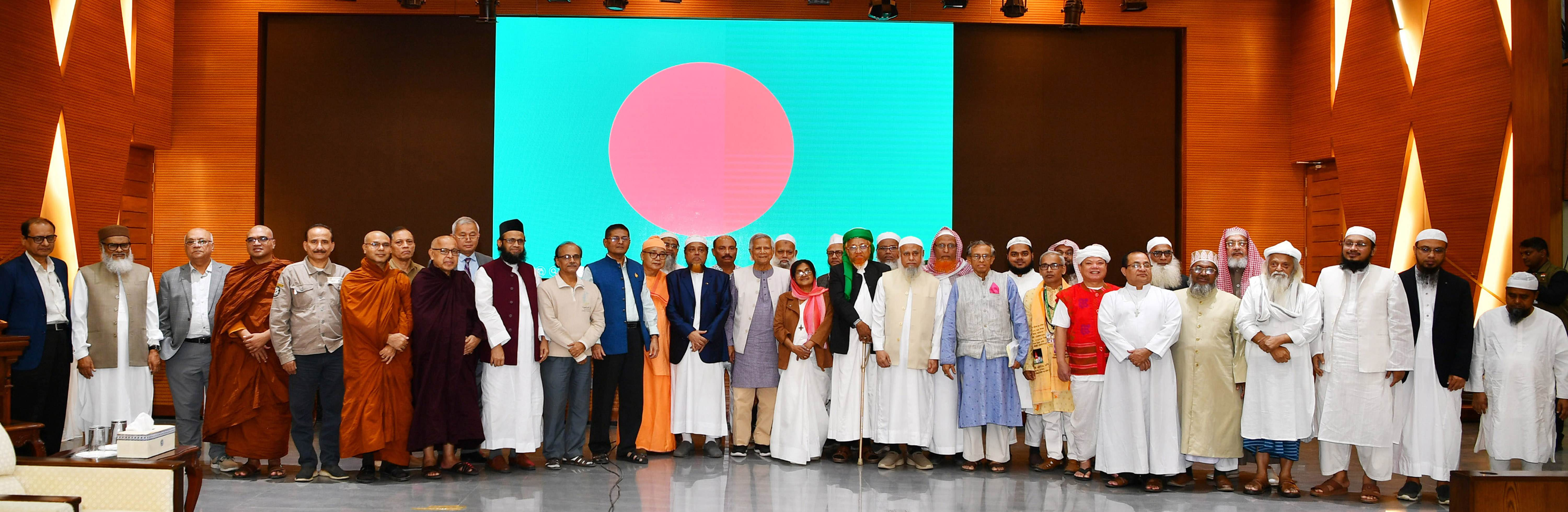
Yunus meeting with the leaders of various religious communities of Bangladesh

In August 2024, the Yunus administration appointed economist Debapriya Bhattacharya to head a committee charged with drafting a white paper on the economy of Bangladesh. In September, Bhattacharya said that all agreements made during the AL regime would be "closely examined".

On 18 August 2024, the interim government expanded the inter-bank market's foreign exchange currency band from 1% to 2.5% to increase liquidity and allow banks to offer "slightly" higher rates. On 29 August, the treasury heads of 47 banks agreed to cap the USD exchange rate at Tk120. However, as state-owned banks continued to offer higher rates, private banks continued to do the same, leading to Bangladesh's remittances rate reaching Tk122. The interim government also implemented a market-based exchange rate. A decrease in under-invoicing, money laundering and the decreased use of informal hundi channels in addition to a stronger dollar and decreased imports saw Bangladesh's remittances grow by 58% (to $4.63bn) in August–September.

However, Inflation and economic growth have been an issue under the interim setup. As per the South Asia Development Update, the World Bank revised its economic growth forecast from 5.7% in April 2024 to 4% in October for the financial year 2025. Political instability exacerbated preexisting inflation. Food inflation under the interim government reached 14% and general inflation 11%. A sudden sharp rise in inflation in July 2024 was mostly attributed to the political turmoil facing Bangladesh; after momentary stabilization, inflation once again begun to increase. The general inflation rate in Bangladesh reached 10.87%, up from 9.92% in September 2024. Later in November, inflation accelerated to 11.38%, the highest in four months.

Development projects deemed "economically less important" were dropped by the interim government, while the owners of ready-made garment industries agreed to an 18-point demand of workers including minimum wage, nightly allowances, increased tiffin, monthly attendance bonusses, etc. Transparency International Bangladesh (TIB) noted "ongoing chaos" in the garment industry. In the banking sector the government reorganized the Board of Directors of Bangladesh Bank (BB), appointed a new central bank governor, and restructured the Boards of several state-owned commercial banks. In response to inflation, Bangladesh Bank untied controls on interest rates to decrease money supply, while the Yunus administration set the prices of 'daily commodities,' withdrew import duties on foodstuffs, removed letter of credit (LC) requirements on 'daily commodity' imports, and said there would be no borrowing limit from banks for companies importing food and fertilizers. Inflation has continued to rise, reaching 11.38%, a four-month high in December.

The interim government cancelled money "whitening" channels by removing a provision previously allowing the legitimization of undeclared assets by levying a 15% tax after asset declaration. Two bodies; an advisory committee to reform the National Board of Revenue (NBR) and a task force to review the Income Tax Act 2023 were constituted by the Interim administration, which also launched an online return filing system for tax year 2024–25 and made the submission of online income tax returns mandatory for certain occupations. (Note: These being: government employees, bankers, employees of mobile operator companies, and officers and employees of six major companies within four city corporations.) Tax exemption status was restored to Grameen Bank and given to As-Sunnah Foundation.

In the stock market, the interim ministry reorganized the Bangladesh Securities and Exchange Commission (BSEC), Dhaka Stock Exchange, and Chittagong Stock Exchange, reduced capital gains tax to 15%, and formed three bodies: a committee to investigate S. Alam and Salman F. Rahman, another to "determine" the fall in market share prices, and a five-member task force to improve the market and recommend reforms. TI Bangladesh said that there had been a "failure" from July to October to meet revenue collection targets and that loopholes continued to exist in property purchasing for legitimizing "black money". On the stock market it said that the "share market is still unstable".

In November 2024, the International Crisis Group (ICG) said "early signs suggest that policymakers can avoid a Sri Lanka-style economic crash" and added exchange rate reforms helped improve foreign reserves while inflation had declined from its peak, although it warned that "serious economic risks remain". The crisis group also said that long-term economic reform was "far longer" than the interim governments "likely lifespan", stating that the government was focused on "short-term macro-economic priorities" such as inflation, foreign reserves and economic stability.

On 2 April 2025, Trump administration imposed 37% "reciprocal" tariff on Bangladesh, which is second highest in South Asia just after Sri Lanka (44%). On 5 April, Yunus called an emergency meeting of experts, advisers and related officials to discuss over the tariff issue. Following the meeting, decisions were made to increase import for reducing trade deficit with the United States. On 7 April, Yunus sent a personal letter to President Donald Trump urging to reconsider the tariffs and requested a three-month postponement of the decision, highlighting steps to reduce trade deficit with the United States. Later, after several series of negotiations, United States reduced tariffs for Bangladesh to 20% that came to effect from 1 August, which Yunus called a "historic treaty" and an "important diplomatic victory".

On 25 April 2025, the interim government issued a presidential ordinance to restructure the National Board of Revenue (NBR). The ordinance stated that the NBR would be dissolved and replaced by two new divisions under the Ministry of Finance – the Revenue Policy Division (RPD) and the Revenue Management Division (RMD). Accordingly, on 13 May 2025, the government dissolved NBR and Internal Resources Division (IRD) and split into two new agencies, through Revenue Policy and Revenue Management Ordinance, 2025. According to the ordinance, where RPD's work would be to monitor the implementation of tax laws and the tax collection situation, the RMD's work would be to collect revenues. Officers of income tax and customs cadres protested the discussion and called for revocation.

Manufacturing sector continued to struggle and job crisis persisted. According to an internal government survey, between August 2024 and July 2025, nearly 245 factories closed, affecting around 100,000 workers. The closures deepened unemployment and prevented recovery in the job market. Unemployment remained high, particularly among graduates, and, according to the executive director of Bangladesh Institute of Labour Studies (BILS), many displaced workers moved into low-quality informal jobs. Rizwanul Islam, former special adviser at the ILO, described the crisis as a transition from "jobless growth" to a "growthless and jobless economy."

Private investment declined from 24 percent of GDP in June 2024 to 22.48 percent in June 2025, one of the sharpest drops in four decades, while public investment fell to a ten-year low, with Annual Development Programme implementation at 11.5 percent between July and November, according to the Centre for Policy Dialogue.

By September 2025, defaulted loans rose to Tk 6,44,515 crore (35.73 percent of total loans) and total government debt reached Tk 22,50,904 crore by the end of FY2024-25, as reported by Bangladesh Bank. Bangladesh's default loan ratio became the highest in the world.

Owing to the strained India-Bangladesh relations, Bangladesh restricted import of yarn from India. The latter, in return, restricted the import of jute from the former.

30 lakhs or 3 million more people fell into poverty during the interim government tenure.

== Foreign affairs ==
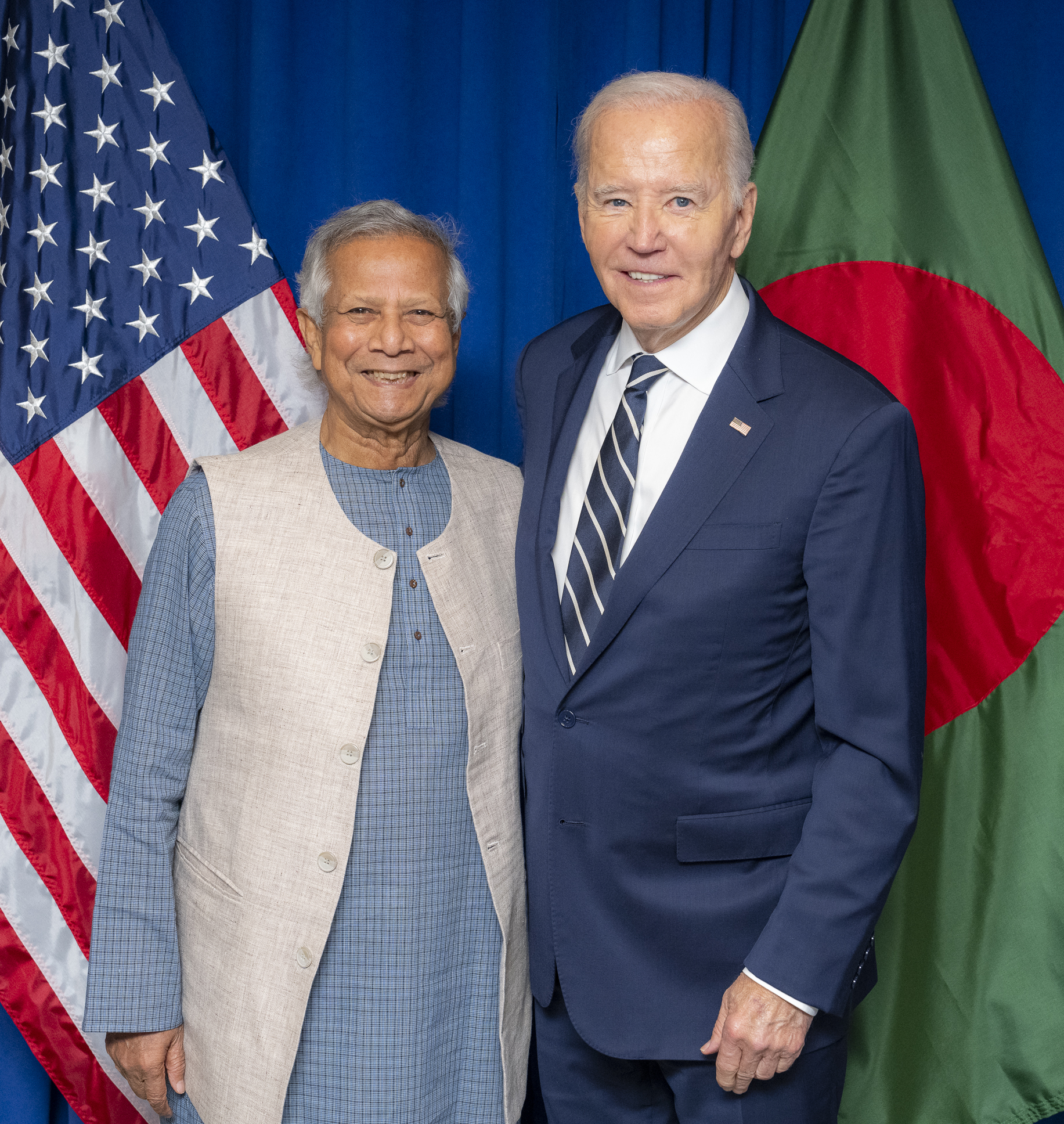
President Joe Biden with Chief Adviser Yunus at the U.N. Headquarters in the New York City.

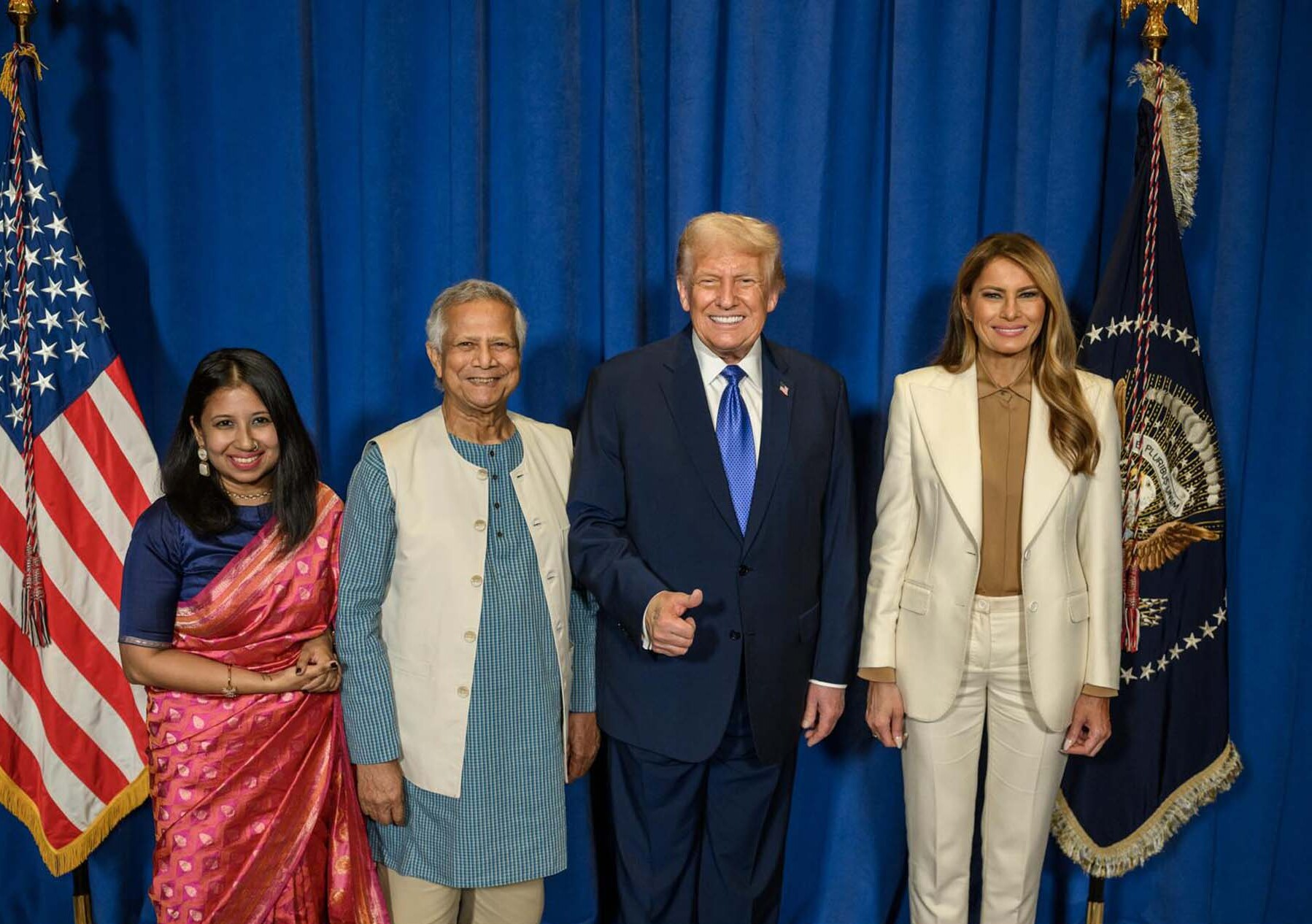
Muhammad Yunus with his daughter Dina Yunus at a reception hosted by U.S. President Donald Trump and First Lady Melania Trump in New York, 27 September 2025

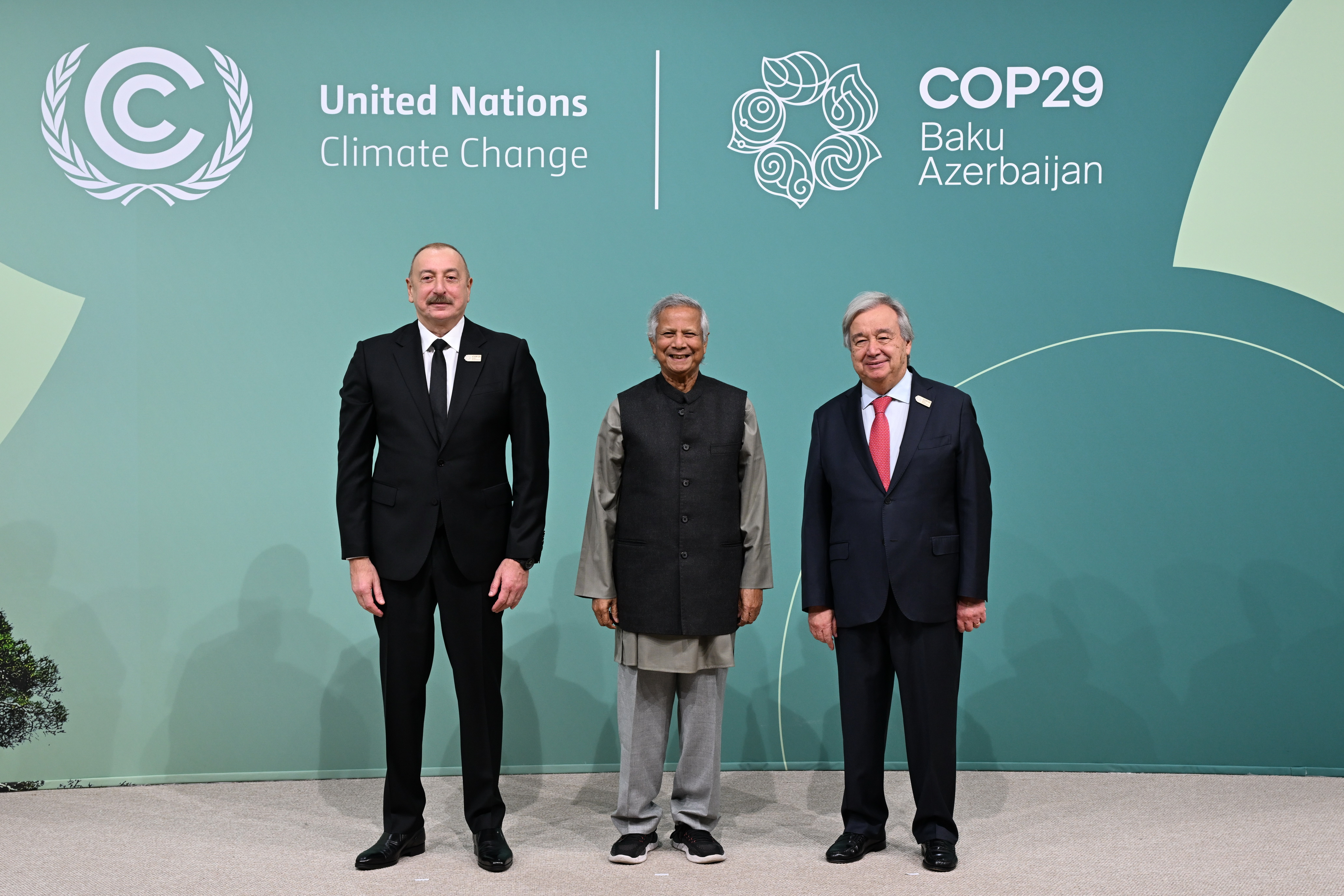
Yunus with President of Azerbaijan Ilham Aliyev and Secretary-General of the UN António Guterres at COP29 in Baku, Azerbaijan

The government engaged in discussions with the ambassadors of different countries, including Palestine, Italy, China, Russia, Pakistan, Saudi Arabia, India, and others.

A few days after becoming the Chief Adviser of the Interim government, Yunus talked with the authorities of the United Arab Emirates. After the discussion, the President of the United Arab Emirates, Mohamed bin Zayed Al Nahyan, pardoned 57 Bangladeshi expatriates who were previously arrested for protesting against the Hasina government.

On 29 August 2024, the International Convention for the Protection of All Persons from Enforced Disappearance was signed by Yunus. It was well received by the people and the United Nations.

On his official foreign visit at Seventy-ninth session of the United Nations General Assembly, Yunus have discussed with the heads of the governments of many countries like Mauritius, Canada, United States, Italy, Pakistan, Nepal, Maldives, and the Netherlands. He also discussed with some high officials like Volker Türk, Ajay Banga, Kristalina Georgieva, Karim Ahmad Khan, Samantha Power, Noel Quinn, and Dick Durbin. He also met former U.S. President Bill Clinton in a programme.

On 14 March 2025, the United Nations Secretary-General António Guterres visited Rohingya camps in Ukhiya, Cox's Bazar. He praised Bangladesh for its humanitarian efforts but stressed the urgent need for international support to sustain aid programs. He also expressed his solidarity with Bangladesh's reform and transition process during his visits.

Large pro-Palestinian demonstrations took place to protest the Gaza war. Subsequently, the Yunus government issued a directive reinstating the stipulation in Bangladeshi passports: "THIS PASSPORT IS VALID FOR ALL COUNTRIES OF THE WORLD EXCEPT ISRAEL", which had been removed in 2021 by the Hasina government.

=== Southeast Asia ===
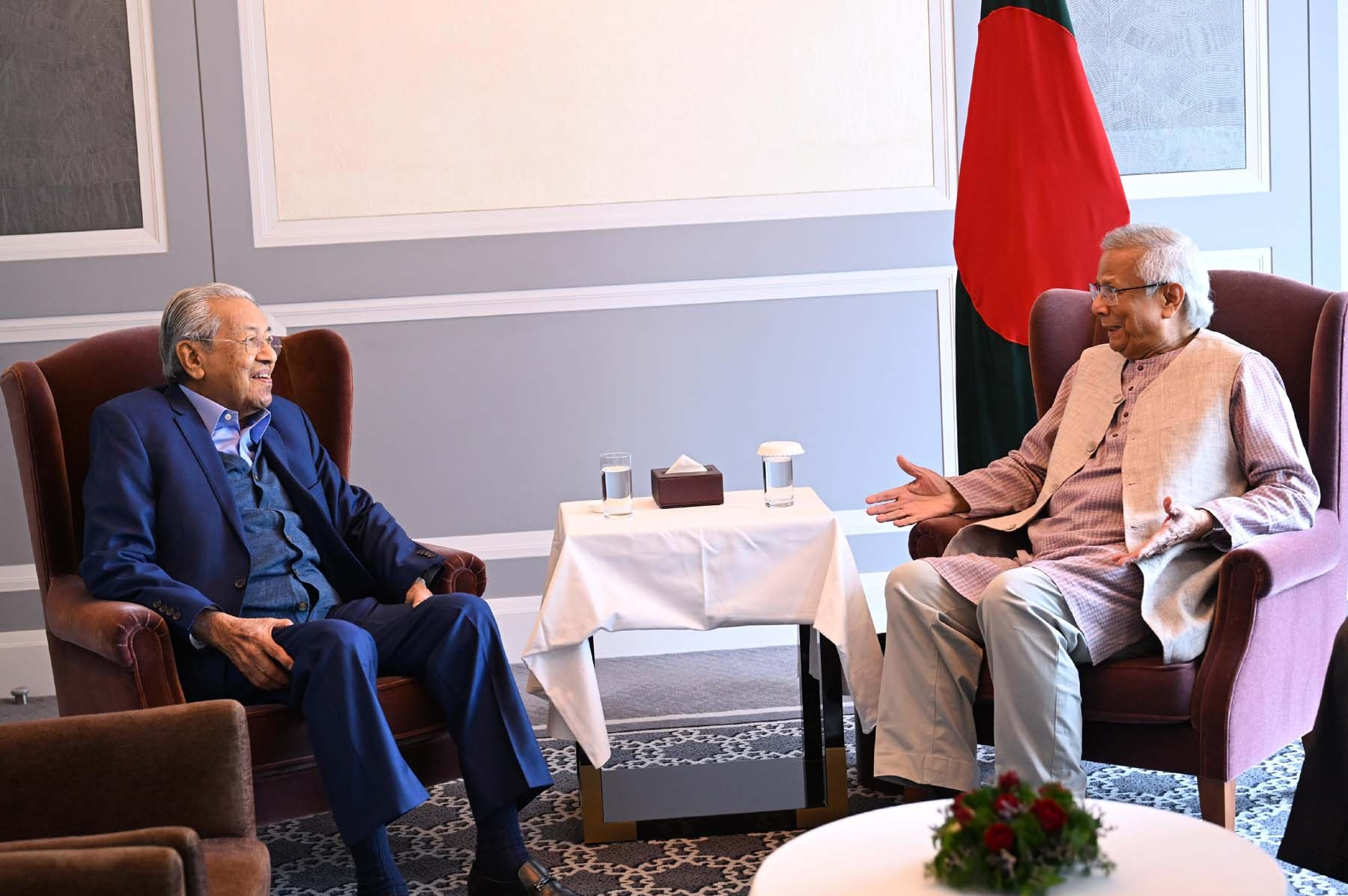
Yunus meeting Malaysian former prime minister Mahathir Mohamad at the Imperial Hotel in Tokyo, Japan on 29 May 2025

On 27–29 August 2024, in a recalibration for foreign policy, Muhammad Yunus met Malaysia's High Commissioner in Dhaka, Haznah Md Hashim, during a visit at the Jamuna State Guest House. He reignited the idea for Accession of Bangladesh to ASEAN, an economic organization of Southeast Asian countries. An idea that was floated since the presidency of Ziaur Rahman in the 70s'. Analysts interpret Bangladesh's eastward diplomatic orientation as a strategic recalibration, potentially signaling a departure from what has been described as an "India-centric foreign policy" under Prime Minister Sheikh Hasina. This shift has been viewed by some as a response to perceived Indian influence over Bangladesh's domestic and foreign affairs. In this context, deeper engagement with Southeast Asia, particularly through aspirations to join ASEAN, is seen as a move to diversify regional partnerships and reduce reliance on India's geopolitical orbit. Yunus has since treated the idea of membership of ASEAN as a top foreign policy priority, remarking that the "ultimate goal for Bangladesh is to join ASEAN as a full member" and that is "where our future is." It has since garnered support from Malaysia and Indonesia. On 4 October, the Prime Minister of Malaysia, Anwar Ibrahim, visited Bangladesh and greeted with Yunus. They discussed strengthening bilateral relations and different sectors of both countries.

=== China ===
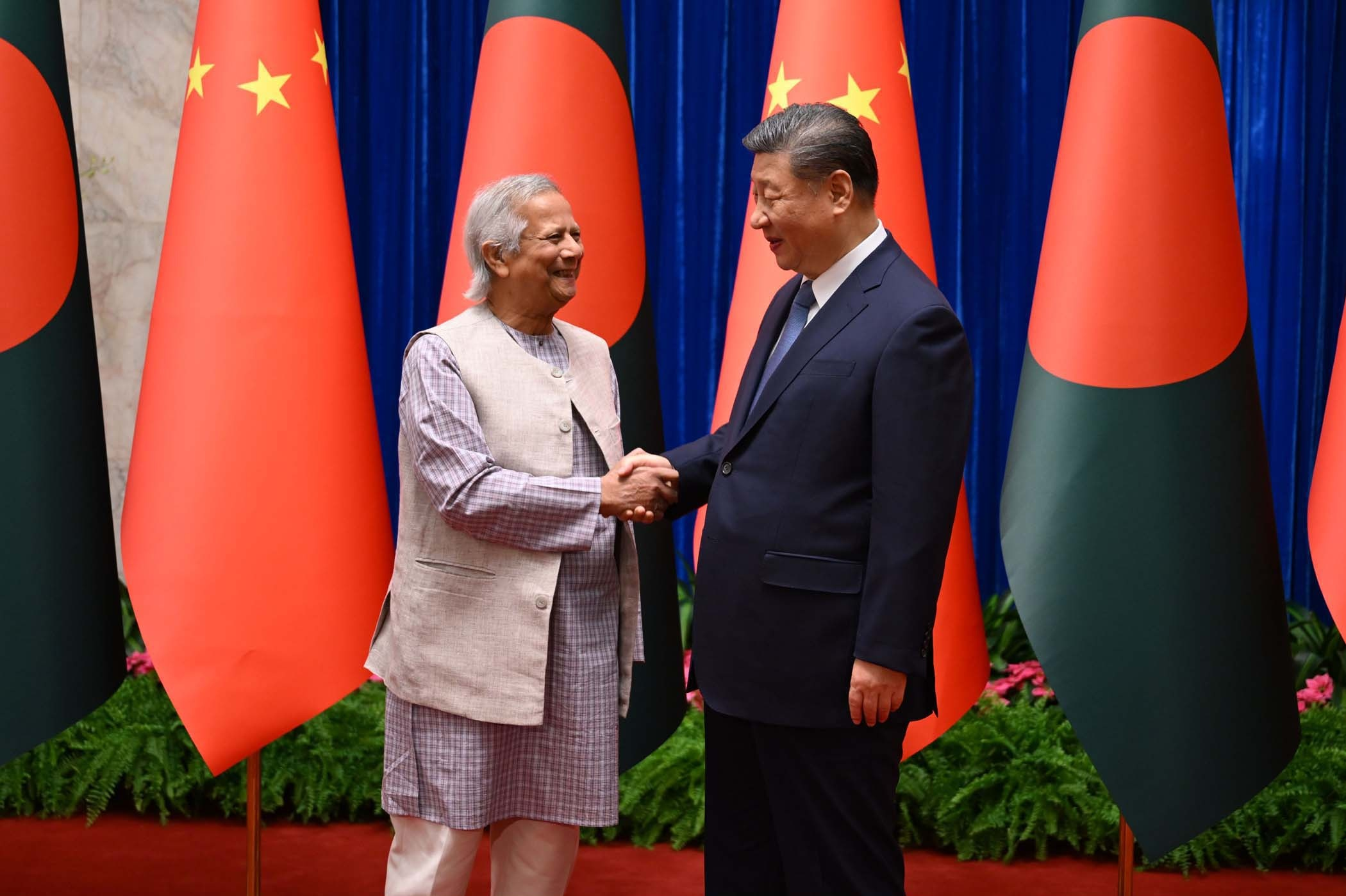
Muhammad Yunus with President of China Xi Jinping in Beijing, China.

On 26 March 2025, the Chief Adviser, Muhammad Yunus, visited China on a four-day trip. During the visit, Chinese President Xi Jinping expressed full support for Bangladesh's interim government and pledged to expand economic and technical cooperation. Yunus raised issues such as Chinese investment in Bangladesh, water management over the Brahmaputra River and the Rohingya crisis. He requested a 50-year master plan from China for comprehensive river and water management. After the suspension of Indian visas for Bangladeshi nationals, China allocated four hospitals in Kunming specifically for Bangladeshi patients. Additionally, China Eastern Airlines plans to operate flights between Bangladesh's port city, Chittagong, and Kunming. Bangladesh has also secured $2.1 billion in investments, loans, and grants from China to enhance infrastructure and manufacturing sectors. During this visit, an agreement on economic and technical cooperation was signed between Bangladesh and China. Furthermore, the two countries signed eight Memorandum of understanding (MoUs) in areas such as literature and publishing, cultural heritage exchange and cooperation, news exchange, media, sports, and health.

=== India ===
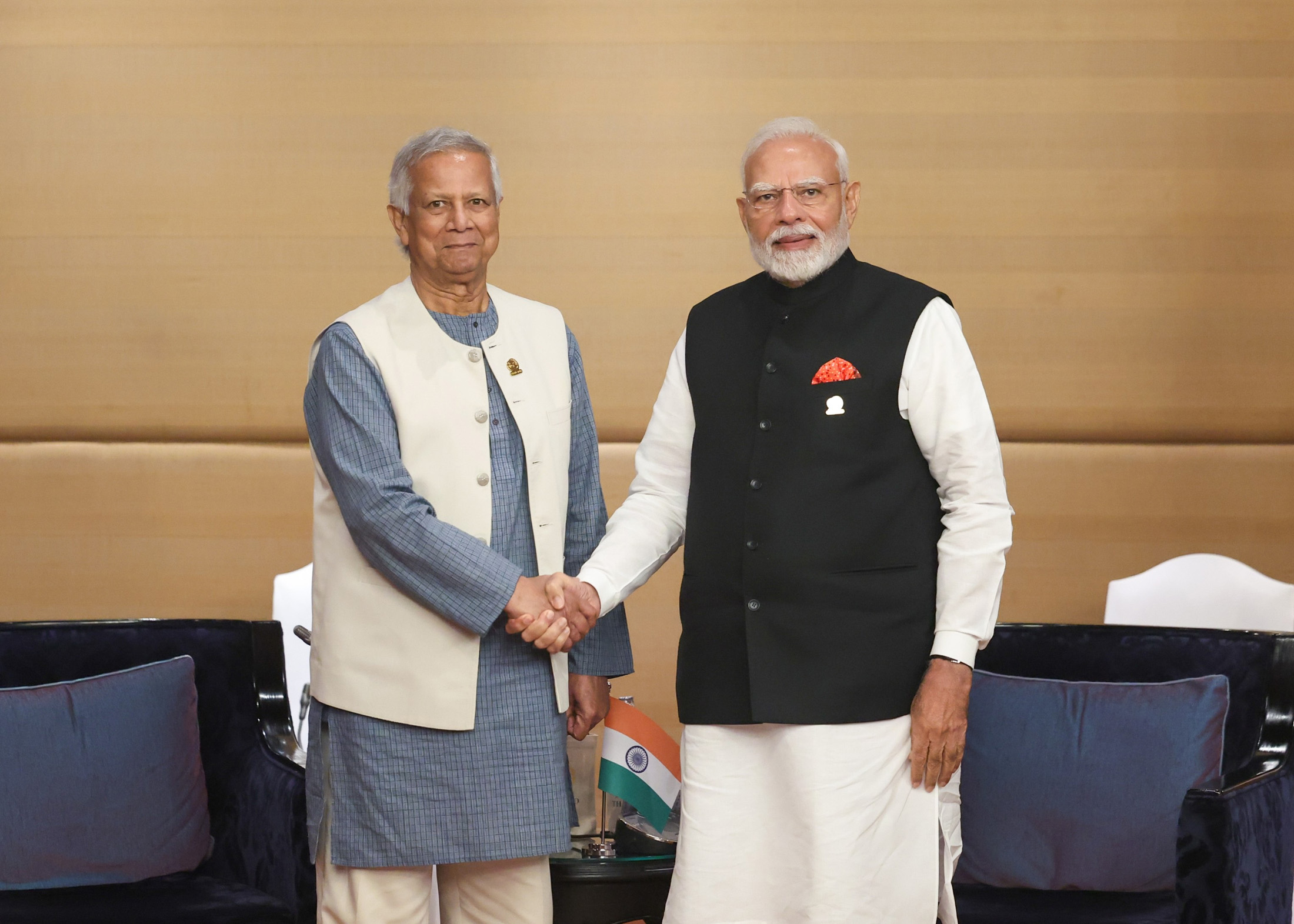
Yunus with Prime minister of India Narendra Modi in Bangkok, Thailand.

The interim government's relationship with India under the leadership of the Prime Minister of India Narendra Modi has significantly nosedived, due to the Modi administration providing refuge to Hasina & its support for the Awami League, differences over the anti-Hindu violence, disinformation from India, the interim government's alleged soft stance on Islamist resurgence, detention of Chinmoy Krishna Das, Indian influence in Bangladesh and close relations with China and Pakistan. Within India, the interim government is portrayed by the Indian Media as a de facto Islamist government.

In the immediate aftermath of the uprising, India halted issuance of visas to Bangladeshi medical tourists & Bangladesh accused India of orchestrating floods by releasing waters from the dams in the Indian state of Tripura. The Bangladesh Assistant High Commission at Agartala was attacked in 2024 by far-right Hindu outfits in protest of the anti-Hindu violence in Bangladesh. Bangladeshis under the interim government have reportedly pressed irrendentist claims over India's eastern & northeastern regions on social media. On 1 April 2025, Yunus claimed "guardianship over the Bay of Bengal" while on his diplomatic visit to China, which drew sharp condemnation from the Indian side. Even Chief Minister of the Indian state of Assam Himanta Biswa Sarma demanded that the Indian government declare an all-out war on Bangladesh in reaction. In late August 2025, the interim government suspended operations of a port of entry bordering Tripura & closed down 3 other ports of entry along the Bangladesh–India border.

On 4 April 2025, Yunus and Modi met each other for the first time since the ouster of Hasina in August 2024. Both leaders engaged in a bilateral meeting in the sideline of 6th BIMSTEC summit in Bangkok. Amongst the discussed topics, were extradition of Hasina, border killings, sharing of the waters of Ganges at the Farakka Barrage and Teesta at the Teesta barrage, persecution of Hindus in Bangladesh following Hasina's exile, and provocative statements made from the both sides. Press Secretary Shafiqul Alam has described the meeting as "constructive, productive, and fruitful". In the meeting, Yunus also gifted a picture of Modi honouring him in 102nd Indian Science Congress in 2015.

Despite strained relations, bilateral trade with India considerably increased under the Yunus government. Furthermore, in the union budget of 2026, India increased allocation for Bangladesh by 74%.

During his farewell speech, Yunus once again invoked India's northeastern "seven sisters" states alongside Nepal and Bhutan without directly mentioning India itself. At this point, the ties between India and Bangladesh were already strained over Yunus' repetitive mention of India's northeast and suggestion that the region could become an extension of Chinese economy.

== Criticism ==
=== Adibashi graffiti controversy ===
A graffiti photo with the term Adibashi was removed from sections of Bangladeshi textbooks describing the religious groups of the country in an effort to maintain "state harmony" and a "pluralistic society". The move was justified owing to the word's association with paganism & the fact that most of these people identify as either Hindu, Christian or Buddhist in official reports. The removal of the graffiti prompted a demonstration by indigenous activists, which would be followed by an attack on the demonstrators by the group "Students for Sovereignty" on 15 January 2025, injuring 20 people. The group previously has criticized Yunus for using the term Adibashi in his speech on 25 August 2024. Protests continued on 16 January, as indigenous rights students, under the Agitated Adibashi Students banner, marched towards the home ministry; the police responded with water cannons and batons in accordance to the principles the interim government followed at the time.

=== Deterioration of law and order ===
The government has received heavy criticism for its apparent failure to quell a spate of crimes against women, especially against minors in the aftermath of the revolution, following the death of an 8-year-old girl from injuries sustained on being gangraped by her 20-year-old brother-in-law and his father in March 2025 at Magura District.

In late-May 2025, Yunus reportedly expressed his dismay and frustration over the situation of the country and proposed reforms. He pointed out lack of cooperation and consensus from the politicians and officials to this government. Prothom Alo reportedly confirmed from several government officials and National Citizen Party (NCP) leader Nahid Islam that Yunus expressed his desire to resign and called off creation of a new interim government in several government meetings.

In June 2025, during Muhammad Yunus visit to London, he was met with protests outside the Dorchester Hotel in Mayfair, led by British Bangladeshis linked to the UK branch of the ousted-Awami League and allied groups. Demonstrators accused his interim government of human rights abuses, and deteriorating law and order, carrying placards that labelled him the "architect of mob rule" and demanded his resignation.

In July 2025, members of the Awami League attacked a venue of the National Citizen Party (NCP) in Gopalganj. The district civil surgeon said 4 people were killed and 13 injured in clashes citing witnesses, said "around 200-300 people armed with sticks vandalised the stage and tore apart the banner. They also exploded some crude bombs." The government-imposed curfew and deployed the Border Guard Bangladesh (BGB) in Gopalganj that day.

There was also widespread violence against Hindu minorities. This was showcased in criminal cases such as the brutal rape of a Hindu girl by a BNP politician, lynching of Dipu Chandra Das and desecration of Hindu temples under the interim government.

=== Resurgence of Islamism ===
Islamism, which had been harshly suppressed by the Hasina regime, saw a resurgence under the Yunus government. In late August, several individuals associated with Islamic terrorist organisations such as Ansarullah Bangla Team and Jamaat-ul-Mujahideen Bangladesh and Islamist parties like Bangladesh Jamaat-e-Islami, who were allegedly imprisoned on false charges, were released from prisons by the interim government. Many were cleared of all charges while some were released on bail. One of the most controversial moves was the release of Mufti Jasimuddin Rahmani, chief of the Ansarullah Bangla Team. There were at least 4 cases lodged against him for inciting terrorism.

In October 2024, despite heavy security and deployment of armed personnel, scattered incidents of idol desecration and violent intimidation of Hindus occurred in various parts of the country during Durga Puja festivities in an attempt to jeopardize the observance of the most important Hindu festival in the country.

In March 2025 Hizb ut Tahrir Bangladesh, a banned Islamist organisation, organised an open demonstration in the capital city of Dhaka, demanding implementation of sharia as the primary law of the land & resumption of khilafat, which, however, also received harsh resistance from the state law-enforcing agencies.

Following an incident of destruction of a mural at Jatiya Kabi Kazi Nazrul Islam University, many intellectuals criticised the Yunus government's lack of action against violence perpetrated by Islamist mobs.

The Bangladesh Hindu Buddhist Christian Unity Council, a non-profit minority rights organization which has been accused for spreading disinformation and fabricated news, accused the Yunus administration of inaction & denialism in quelling religious violence against minorities perpetrated by Islamists, in a press statement issued on 10 July 2025.

=== Ban on Awami League ===
In May 2025, the Awami League, accused the interim government of undermining democratic norms by banning all its activities and "stoking division". The Bangladesh Nationalist Party had earlier opposed the proposal to impose the ban. Critics argue that banning Bangladesh's oldest and most electorally dominant party risks undermining democratic principles by targeting political affiliation rather than individual wrongdoing. They note that millions still identify with the party's historical role in securing Bangladeshi independence despite concerns over its recent leadership. The ban, which extends beyond top leaders to suspend all party activity — including its affiliated wings — has closed offices, cancelled events, and removed online platforms. For ordinary members not implicated in any wrongdoing, the move effectively denies them political representation and may deepen existing political divisions.

=== Economic mismanagement ===
Critics argue that Yunus failed to capitalize on an opportunity on account of strong political support, which would have allowed him to reform the weakened state structure, reduce poverty, stabilize the financial sector, and strengthen institutions. The Daily Sun remarked that the "poverty magician" departed "leaving more poor behind." Economist and former Vice-Chancellor of Jahangirnagar University, Abdul Bayes, stated that people expected the economy to recover under his leadership but most economic indicators reportedly declined.

=== Accusations of suppressing free press ===
During the Resignation of Sheikh Hasina-led Awami League regime in the July Uprising various cases of official and unofficial persecution and harassment against the journalists were reported throughout the country. According to Ain o Salish Kendra, 294 attacks and harassment took place against journalists in Yunus government, 62 such incidents took place in 2025. Rights and Risks Analysis Group reported 640 journalists were targeted by the Interim government, and 118 journalists accreditation of press council were stripped.

Despite these, the government promised to support freedom of the press, while criticizing the media for its role during the uprising against Sheikh Hasina. The government also dismissed claims of suppressing free press.

In a December 2025 UN report, UN special rapporteur Irene Khan stated that,

Media freedom particularly faced severe pressure in Bangladesh over the year since the July Uprising, with hundreds of journalists arrested on "politically motivated" and dubious charges, many arbitrarily detained, and a government that, according to her, continued a pattern of impunity, allowing hate speech and smear campaigns to persist unchecked.

=== Allegations of special privileges and favouritism ===
The government has been accused of giving special privileges and facilities to Grameen family of organisations, including speedy approval of Grameen University, Grameen Employment's manpower export licence and Grameen Telecom's digital wallet. Also, Grameen Bank's government stake was lowered from 25% to 10% and its five-year tax exemption was reinstated. Apart from this, the cases against Yunus were also dismissed without completing the trial proceedings soon after he became the Chief Adviser.

The Ministry of Foreign Affairs under the interim government led by Yunus has come under increasing scrutiny over allegations of favoritism, politicization, and internal rivalries in diplomatic appointments. Critics point to smear campaigns, delays in decision-making, and a lack of accountability within the ministry. These issues were highlighted by the delayed and contested appointment of Mohammad Sufiur Rahman as Special Assistant to the Chief Adviser with executive authority, raising concerns about the Foreign Advisor's role and reflecting broader dysfunction. The ministry's reduced influence has been further underscored by the growing prominence of Khalilur Rahman as National Security Adviser who has led key international engagements as several foreign governments and organisations increasingly bypass the ministry in favor of direct coordination with the Chief Adviser's Office.

In July 2025, the executive director of Transparency International Bangladesh, Iftekharuzzaman, called for the government to "disclose a breakdown of spending by each commission. This would ensure greater transparency and accountability", regarding the finances of the 11 reform commissions.

=== Funding suspension and Bureaucratic delays in Measles vaccine procurement ===
The interim government led by Muhammad Yunus neglected the national immunization programme and suspended funding for vaccination efforts. In September 2025, the government discontinued vaccine procurement through UNICEF and shifted to an open tender system. However, the tender process became entangled in bureaucratic complications, leading to disruptions in vaccine supply. As a result, by 26 May 2026, a total of 467 deaths associated with suspected measles symptoms had been reported, of which 88 were officially confirmed as measles-related. During the same period, 66,023 people with suspected measles symptoms were identified, including 8,772 confirmed cases.

The interim government faced criticism over its handling of Bangladesh's measles vaccination programme following a major outbreak in 2026. According to reporting by the Times of India, changes to vaccine procurement and delays in securing measles-rubella vaccine supplies disrupted routine childhood immunisation and contributed to vaccine shortages. Physicians and public health experts quoted by the newspaper argued that the resulting decline in immunisation coverage increased children's susceptibility to measles.

More than 450 children had died during the outbreak by May 2026. The newspaper reported that a public interest litigation filed before the Bangladesh High Court sought an investigation into vaccine procurement decisions made during the interim government, alleging that delays and policy decisions contributed to the shortages. The matter was reported as being before the court at the time.

The outbreak prompted emergency vaccination campaigns supported by the Government of Bangladesh, World Health Organization, UNICEF and GAVI. Reporting by the BBC described the nationwide emergency immunisation campaign as an effort to contain the outbreak and restore routine vaccination coverage following a sharp rise in measles cases.

=== Others ===
Other criticism and controversies related to the interim government include lack of judicial freedom, government intervention in the sports sector, environmental degradation, loose polythene control policy, transportation and connectivity issues, fall of trade and foreign investment, price hike and inflation, and visa bans.

According to a human rights organisation in Bangladesh, since the Yunus-led interim government assumed office in 2024, reports claimed at least 293 people were killed in mob violence until December 2025.

According to Ain o Salish Kendra (ASK), 197 people were killed in lynchings or mob violence in 2025. ASK stated that political violence in Bangladesh intensified after 5 August 2024 and continued into 2025, with at least 401 incidents recorded between January and December 2025, resulting in 102 deaths and approximately 4,744 injuries.

== Cabinet ==
President Mohammed Shahabuddin administered the oath of office to Muhammad Yunus and his council of advisers at Bangabhaban on 8 August 2024. The cabinet currently consists of Yunus as chief adviser, 20 Advisers, 8 Special positions under the chief adviser's office and 5 Minister of State. Apart from one Hindu adviser (Bidhan Ranjan Roy) and one Buddhist adviser (Supradip Chakma), all other members of the council are Muslim, also one (Supradip Chakma) out of all members is non-Bengali ethnic minority; out of which five are women (Lamiya Morshed, Farida Akhter, Nurjahan Begum, Rizwana Hasan and Sharmeen Murshid). Three student activists (Mahfuz Alam, Asif Mahmud and Nahid Islam) had also been included in the council. The Jamuna State Guest House is serving as the official residence of the chief adviser. Adviser A. F. Hassan Ariff dies while being in office. Later, Nahid Islam resigned in order to form the political party, National Citizen Party in February 2025, while Mahfuj Alam and Asif Mahmud resigned the cabinet.

== Approval ratings ==
Polling firm/Link	Fieldwork date	Date published	Sample size	Margin of Error	Approval		Disapproval		"Can't say" / Neutral		No answer		Net approval	
Polling firm/Link	Fieldwork date	Date published	Sample size	Margin of Error	Politics	Economy	Politics	Economy	Politics	Economy	Politics	Economy	Politics	Economy
Prothom Alo	21 – 28 October 2025	8 December 2025	1,342 (Note: The survey was conducted on the people aged between 18 and 55)	–	54.5% (Note: 49.3% correspondents said "somewhat satisfied" and 5.2% said "extremely satisfied".)		22.5% (Note: 18.9% correspondents said "somewhat dissatisfied" and 3.6% said "extremely dissatisfied".)		23.1%		–		+32%	
International Republican Institute	13 September – 12 October 2025	1 December 2025	4,985	± 1.4%	38%	52%	59%	46%	–	–	4%	2%	-21%	+6%
Innovation Consulting	2 – 15 September 2025	21 September 2025	10,415	–	78.7% (Note: 39.5% correspondents said "good" and 39.2% said "fair".)		21.3%		–		–		+57.4%	
BRAC	15 — 31 October 2024	12 December 2024	4,158	± 1.55%	56%	32%	34%	43%	8%	4%	2%	1%	+22%	-9%
BRAC	22 Aug – 5 September 2024	16 September 2024	2,366	± 2.0%	71%	60%	29%	40%	–	–	–	–	+42%	+20%

== See also ==
- Caretaker government of Fakhruddin Ahmed – Period of the Government of Bangladesh from 2007 to 2009
