= Bangladesh Development Forum =

Bangladesh Development Forum is a biannual, was annual till 2005, conference in Bangladesh between the government and donor agencies. This is an invite only meeting let by the Finance Minister of Bangladesh.

== History ==
The first meeting of the Bangladesh Development Forum was held in 2002. It replaced the Aid Consortium held in Paris.

On 2 March 2005, Bangladesh government announced that they will take over the management of Bangladesh Development Forum from the World Bank. The government announced they will provide funding and make arrangements to hold the forum through Economic Relations Division under the Ministry of Finance. The government also stated that the conference would be biannual rather than annual from now on.

In 2015, the Bangladesh Development Forum meet five years after the last meeting in 2010. The Government of Bangladesh, presented a US$10 billion pe year plan to invest in the infrastructure of Bangladesh. The meeting was attended by Janina Jaruzelski, head of USAID Bangladesh and co-chairperson of the Local Consultative Group, told the media discussions will focus on Bangladesh graduating to a middle income country by 2021.

In January 2018, the two day Bangladesh Development Forum meeting took place at Pan Pacific Sonargaon, Dhaka. OPEC Fund for International Development, Ministry of Foreign Affairs of Japan, Asian Development Bank, and the World Bank were represented at the meeting. The meeting hosted 700 delegates and was inaugurated by Prime Minister Sheikh Hasina.

In January 2020, the forum meeting took place at the Bangabandhu International Conference Center.
