= Bangladesh Planning Commission =

Commission under Ministry of Planning, Government of Bangladesh

- বাংলাদেশ পরিকল্পনা কমিশন

Agency overview
- Formed: 31 January 1972; 54 years ago
- Jurisdiction: Government of Bangladesh
- Headquarters: Bangladesh Secretariat, Dhaka
- Minister responsible: Amir Khasru Mahmud Chowdhury, Ministry of Planning
- Website: plancomm.gov.bd

Bangladesh Planning Commission (Bengali: বাংলাদেশ পরিকল্পনা কমিশন; denoted as PC) is the economic public policy institution of the Government of Bangladesh. The Planning Commission undertakes research studies and policy development initiatives for the growth of national economy and the expansion of the public infrastructure of the country, under the Ministry of Planning and alongside the Ministry of Finance.

In addition, the planning division of the Planning Commission serves as the secretariat for all major economic policy questions and for initiating the appraisal of development projects and programmes by:

- National Economic Council (NEC)
- Executive Committee of the National Economic Council (ECNEC)

== National Economic Council (NEC) ==
The National Economic Council is the highest political authority for the consideration of economic policies and development activities reflective of long-term national policy objectives of the government of Bangladesh. It serves as the economic "mini-cabinet", consisting of the main economic ministers and their officials, and is chaired by the prime minister.

Generally, the ministries formulate their respective plans, programmes or projects, as per the objectives formulated by the NEC. The NEC meets when called by the prime minister, and meetings can include external invitees dependent on the subject under consideration. All NEC proposals are later provided to ECNEC to be approved.

=== Structure ===
1. Prime Minister of Bangladesh (chairperson)
2. Cabinet ministers (as members) who have economic portfolios

=== Supporting officials ===
1. Cabinet Secretary
2. Governor, Bangladesh Bank
3. All members, Bangladesh Planning Commission
4. Secretary, concerned ministry/divisions

=== Functions of the NEC ===
- To provide overall guidance of the formulation of Five Year Plans and the Annual Development Programme
- To finalise and approve economic plans, programmes and policies
- To review progress of implementation of development programme
- To take such others decisions and actions as may be considered necessary for socio- economic development
- To appoint sub-committees as deemed fit to assist the NEC to discharge specific responsibilities
- Evaluation impact analysis of project, programmes and plans on the national living standard

=== Meetings ===
- Meeting of NEC is held every month, and can be held earlier if required by the prime minister (who is the chair)
- Planning Division provides secretariat to the NEC

== Executive Committee of the National Economic Council (ECNEC) ==
The ECNEC Wing of the Planning Commission is in charge of coordinating meetings of the ECNEC, and monitoring the implementation of decisions taken at the meetings.

ECNEC Wing is headed by a Joint Secretary of the Bangladesh Civil Service (Administration) cadre, who is supported by two Deputy Secretaries and two Senior Assistant Secretaries.

=== Structure ===
1. Prime minister, chairperson
2. Minister, Ministry of Finance, alternate chairperson
3. Minister, Ministry of Labour and Employment
4. Minister, Ministry of Water Resources
5. Minister, Ministry of Commerce
6. Minister, Ministry of Road Transport and Bridges
7. Minister, Ministry of Shipping
8. Minister/State minister of the concerned ministry

=== Supporting officials ===
1. Cabinet secretary, Cabinet Division
2. Principal secretary or secretary, Prime Minister's Office
3. Secretary, Economic Relations Division
4. Secretary, Finance Division
5. Secretary, Planning Division
6. Secretary, Implementation Monitoring and Evaluation Division
7. Member, General Economics Division, Planning Commission
8. Member, Programming, Planning Commission
9. Secretary, Concerned Ministry/Division

=== Functions of the ECNEC ===
The primary functions of the ECNEC Wing are the following:

- To call meetings among members of NEC, ECNEC and other relevant officials
- Prepare the agenda and minutes of meetings, distribute, and publish them across government for action
- Monitor decisions taken at the meetings for implementation

=== Meetings ===
To consider and approve yearly target of foreign aid bids, expansion of trade, export of manpower as well as to review the progress of other annual targets.

- Meeting of ECNEC is held as and when required by Chairperson
- Planning Division provides secretariat to the ECNEC

== See also ==
- Economy of Bangladesh
