= Nurul Husain Khan =

Nurul Husain Khan was a Bangladesh government secretary and former chairman of the National Board of Revenue. He is the founding chairman of the Eastern Bank Limited. He was a member of the board of governors of the North South University.

== Early life ==
Khan studied political science at the University of Dhaka. His son, Adeeb H. Khan, is an executive committee member of the Bangladesh Legal Aid and Services Trust.

== Career ==
In 1957, Khan joined the Pakistan Taxation Service. During the Bangladesh Liberation War, he was working as a deputy secretary in the Ministry of Commerce of Pakistan. He returned to independent Bangladesh in 1973.

Khan was the economic minister at the Bangladesh Embassy in Saudi Arabia.

Khan is the former secretary of the Internal Resources Division at the Ministry of Finance.

Khan served as the chairperson of the National Board of Revenue from 19 January 1991 to 29 April 1992. From 1992 to 2000, he served as the first chairperson of Eastern Bank Limited. In 2002, he became the founding chairman of the Sapporo Dental College and General Hospital.

Khan was a member of the board of governors of North South University, the first private university in Bangladesh. He was also its first treasurer. He was an independent director of Pioneer Insurance Company Limited.

From 2009 to 2014, Khan was an independent director of Union Capital Limited. He was an independent Director of Green Delta Insurance PLC.

== Death ==
Khan died on 10 December 2020 at his residence in Gulshan, Dhaka. He was buried at Banani graveyard.
