= Children's Day (Bangladesh) =

Day of celebration for children

Bangladesh Children's Day (Bengali: শিশু দিবস) was celebrated on 17 March, coinciding with the birthday of Sheikh Mujibur Rahman. However, at present, Bangladesh have shifted Children's Day to November 20 aligning with World Children's Day.

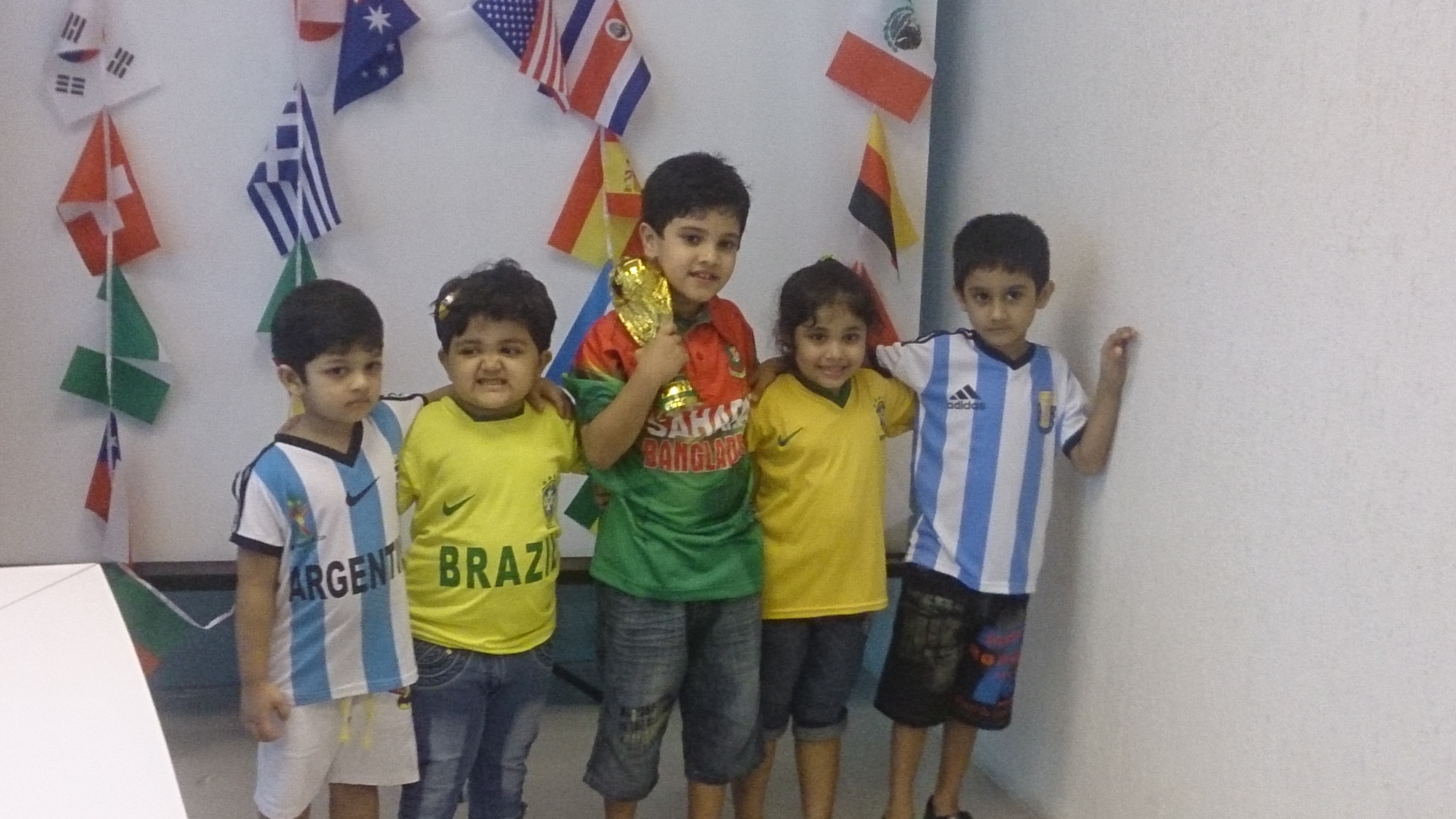
Children playing at school in Dhaka, Bangladesh

== History ==
Bangladesh Children's Day, was celebrated annually on 17 March. The day was declared as National Children's Day after the Awami League came to power in 1996. Sheikh Mujibur Rahman, former Prime Minister of Bangladesh was born on 17 March 1920. His birthday was a public holiday in Bangladesh, observed with various activities promoting children's rights and welfare. Despite the existence of International Children's Day, Bangladesh did not have a National Children's Day until this declaration. The day has been celebrated since 1997, the interim government of Bangladesh removed it from the list of public holidays in 2024.

=== Celebration ===
17 March was considered a public holiday in Bangladesh by the Awami League government. In 2024, the Yunus ministry removed it from the list of public holidays.
