= Gerry Wolstenholme =

English author and historian

- Occupations: Author, historian
- Spouse: Linda (m. 1964–2004; her death)

Gerry Wolstenholme is an English author and sports historian from Blackpool, Lancashire. His genres are football and cricket. He wrote his first book in 1992.

== Early life ==
Wolstenholme was born in Blackpool, England, and became a supporter of Blackpool F.C., the town's professional football club. He attended Northlands school between the ages of three and five, then Devonshire Road School in Blackpool and Baines Grammar School in Poulton-le-Fylde.

He saw an advertisement for Civil Service examinations and decided to take them. He passed, and moved to London to begin working at Her Majesty's Treasury in Whitehall. He was promoted, and worked in the office of the Chancellor of the Exchequer.

== Career ==
He produced The Cheltenham Spectator and Festival News, a daily summary of the Cheltenham Cricket Festival, for six years. He also published his own The Cricket Postcard Collectors' Journal, which ran for 24 issues.

He contributed regularly to Blackpool F.C.'s matchday programmes.

== Personal life ==
Wolstenholme married Linda in 1968. Four years later, they returned to Blackpool, where he worked for the Department of National Savings. He also ran a second-hand and antiquarian bookstore on Elizabeth Street. He wrote his first book, The West Indian Tour of England, 1906, during this time.

He became a widower upon his wife's death in 2004. He wrote The Lost-Love Poems of a Madman, a book of poetry, as a result of it and his subsequent breakdown.

== Bibliography ==
A selected list of books Wolstenholme has written.

- The West Indian Tour of England, 1906 (1992)
- From Peak to 'Pool: A Short History of Lancashire versus Derbyshire matches at Blackpool (1994)
- Really Lancashire (1996)
- Cup Kings (1998)
- The Tour of the 'Gentlemen of Philadelphia' in Great Britain in 1884 (2002, with John P. Green)
- Cricket with Laughter: Sir Lindsay Parkinson's XI v West Indies, Blackpool 1933 (2006)
- The Khaki Years: Blackpool Football Club, The First World War Years (2008)
- Return to the Top Flight: Blackpool Football Club's Promotion Campaign 1969/70 (2010)
- Blackpool FC: Miscellany. Seasiders Trivia, History, Facts & Stats (2011)
