= Income Tax Intelligence and Investigation Unit =

Bangladeshi government agency

- Log of the Income Tax Intelligence and Investigation Unit

Government agency overview
- Formed: November 19, 2023; 2 years ago
- Type: Intelligence and investigation agency
- Jurisdiction: Bangladesh
- Headquarters: Dhaka, Bangladesh
- Parent Government agency: National Board of Revenue (NBR)
- Website: itiiu.org

Income Tax Intelligence and Investigation Unit (ITIIU) is a specialized agency under the National Board of Revenue (NBR) of the Government of Bangladesh. According to the order for administrative reform, restructuring, and expansion of the Income Tax Division under the National Board of Revenue, which is part of the Internal Resources Division of the Ministry of Finance, it was established on 19 November 2023. This is a specialized unit operating under the National Board of Revenue. Its purpose is to conduct intelligence activities to detect and prevent income tax evasion. The formation of the Income Tax Intelligence and Investigation Unit has helped increase transparency and accountability in tax administration, improve efficiency in tax collection, and build trust in the country's revenue system.

== History and background ==
To ensure transparency in income tax collection and management in Bangladesh, the Income Tax Intelligence and Investigation Unit was established on 19 November 2023, following the administrative reform, restructuring, and expansion order of the Income Tax Division under the National Board of Revenue, which operates under the Internal Resources Division of the Ministry of Finance. Around 2010, as incidents of income tax evasion increased, the government expanded this unit's activities to conduct more effective investigations. Previously, the NBR's own investigation division typically carried out such tasks, but growing demands made it necessary to form a separate and efficient unit. The Income Tax Intelligence and Investigation Unit collects, analyzes, and investigates information on tax evasion in key economic sectors across the country. Using modern technology, the unit identifies large financial transactions and cases of asset concealment, providing information for legal action against those involved.

== Activities ==
This unit investigates crimes such as tax evasion, false information, fraud, and money laundering. It collects data from various locations across Bangladesh, conducts surveillance, performs financial analysis, and carries out operations and inquiries. If evidence is found during an investigation, legal action is taken against those involved.

== See also ==
- National Board of Revenue
- Economy of Bangladesh
