= Abdur Rouf Talukder =

Former Governor of Bangladesh Bank (born 1964)

- আব্দুর রউফ তালুকদার
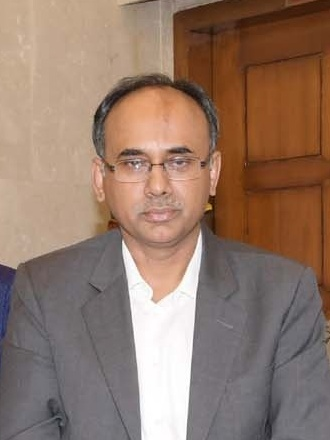
- Abdur Rouf Talukder in 2019.

12th Governor of Bangladesh Bank
- In office 4 July 2022 – 9 August 2024
- President: Mohammad Abdul Hamid; Mohammed Shahabuddin
- Prime Minister: Sheikh Hasina; Muhammad Yunus (Chief adviser)
- Preceded by: Fazle Kabir
- Succeeded by: Ahsan H. Mansur

Personal details
- Born: 15 August 1964 (age 62)
- Spouse: Selina Rawshan
- Education: University of Dhaka; University of Birmingham

Abdur Rouf Talukder is a former governor of the Bangladesh Bank who served during 2022–2024. Prior to this position, he had served as the senior secretary of the Ministry of Finance. He previously served as a director of Biman Bangladesh Airlines. Following Sheikh Hasina's resignation as prime minister, Talukder resigned on 9 August 2024 and, according to cited reports, left the country.

== Early life ==
Talukder was born on 15 August 1964 in Sirajganj District, East Pakistan, present day Bangladesh.

== Education ==
alukder completed his Secondary School Certificate (SSC) at St. Joseph Higher Secondary School. and completed a Master of Business Administration at the Institute of Business Administration, University of Dhaka. He has a second master's degree in development studies from the University of Birmingham.

In addition, Talukder attended a number of professional training courses at Harvard Kennedy School of Government, Boston, USA; IMF Institute, Washington, D.C., United States; Crown Agents Training & Professional Development Center, London, UK; Institute of Public Finance (IPF), Dhaka, etc.

Talukder is married to Selina Rawshan and has two children.

== Career ==
Talukder joined the Bangladesh Civil Service in 1985. He was a member of the Bangladesh Civil Service Administration Cadre.

In October 2017, Talukder was appointed the additional secretary of budget and macroeconomics in the Finance Division of the Ministry of Finance.

Talukder was appointed the acting secretary of the Ministry of Finance on 16 July 2018. He replaced Mohammad Muslim Chowdhury.

At a conference organised by Bangladesh Institute of Development Studies, Talukder blamed the Ministry of Health for failing to spend its budget during the COVID-19 pandemic in Bangladesh. He received the FY 2020-21 Integrity Award from the government of Bangladesh. On 21 September 2021, he was promoted to the rank of senior secretary.

Talukder served as a director of Bangladesh Foreign Trade Institute and Bangladesh Public Administration Training Centre. He was part of a delegation led by Salman F. Rahman to the World Bank. He is a director of Hotels International Limited. He held a variety of government positions, primarily in public finance and economic management. He worked in the Finance Division for more than 18 years before being appointed finance secretary on 17 July 2018.

Talukder also served in the Ministry of Industries, the Ministry of Food, and the Ministry of Information. He also served as first secretary (commercial) at the Bangladesh High Commission in Kuala Lumpur.

On 11 June 2022, the government appointed Talukder governor of Bangladesh Bank. On 9 August 2024, he resigned from his post. He has not been attending his office since 5 August, when Prime Minister Sheikh Hasina resigned and fled the country in the face of a mass uprising led by the Anti-Discrimination Student Movement.

After the fall of the Sheikh Hasina-led Awami League government, a murder case was filed against Talukder by Bangladesh Nationalist Party politician Mohammad Zaman Hossain Khan over the death of a protestor in July 2024.

== Criticism ==
In a New York-based Global Finance magazine ranking, Talukder received a D grade, while the governor of Sri Lanka's central bank received an A− grade. Shaktikanta Das, governor of the Reserve Bank of India, received an A+ grade.

Talukder banned journalists from the premises of Bangladesh Bank, a move that led journalists to boycott coverage, which resulted in journalists boycotting coverage of Talukder.
