= National savings certificate =

National Savings Certificate may refer to:

- National Savings and Investments, a government-owned savings bank in the United Kingdom, which was formerly known as the National Savings Bank.
- National Savings Certificates (India)
- National Savings Certificates (Bangladesh)
