= Sharifa Khan =

Bangladeshi civil bureaucrat

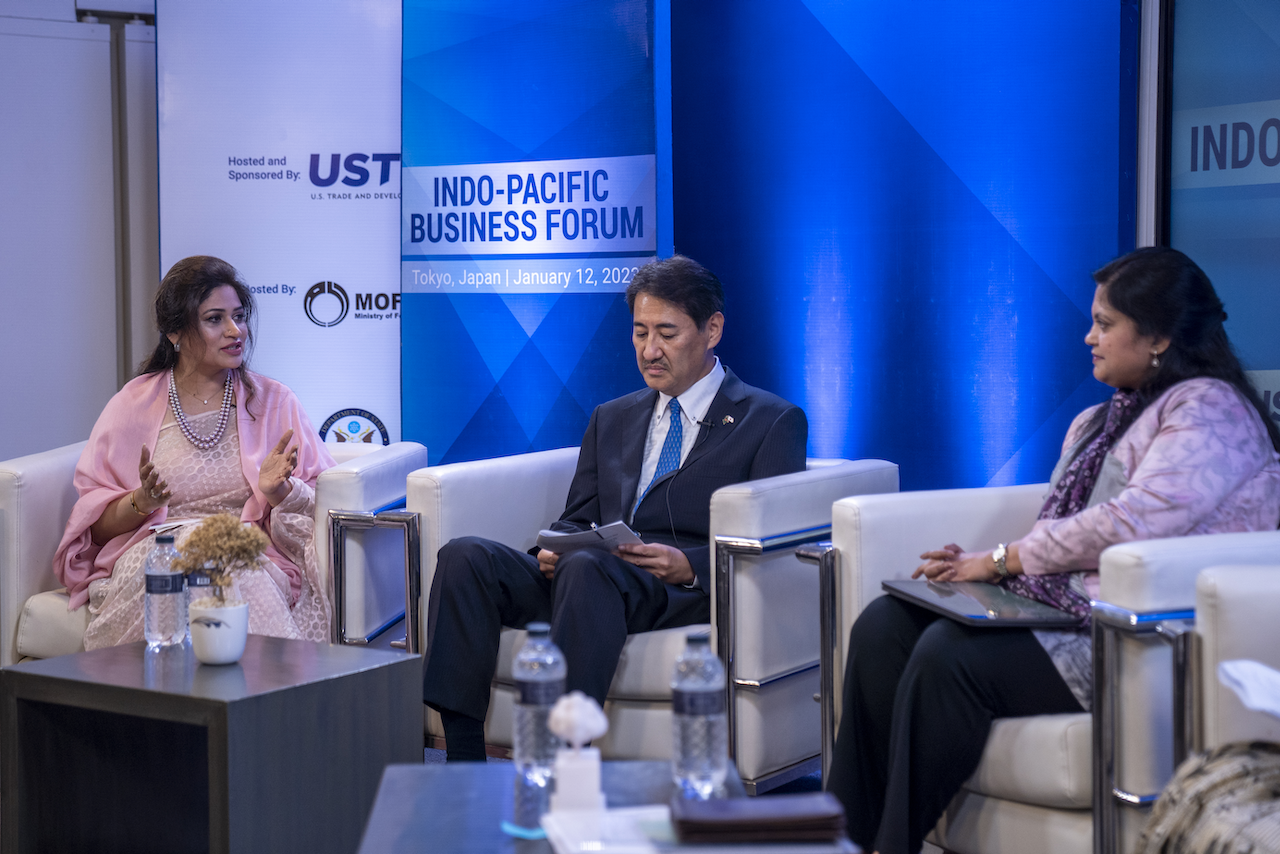
Sharifa Khan at Indo-Pacific Business Forum (2023)

Sharifa Khan is a Bangladeshi retired civil bureaucrat and the second female secretary at Economic Relations Division, Ministry of finance Bangladesh from 17 July 2022 to 23 November 2024. Prior to the current position, she was a member of the Agriculture, Water Resources and Rural Institute Division of the Bangladesh Planning Commission.

In addition to the above-mentioned posts, she held Additional Secretary (Development) of Bangladesh Commerce Ministry and adjunct faculty, Bangladesh Institute of Governance and Management.

== Early life and education ==
Sharifa khan was born in Mirzapur upazila of Tangail district. After completed her Bachelor (Honors) and master's degrees in economics from Dhaka University she joined Bangladesh Civil service with 9th Batch at 26 January 1991. She completed her 2nd Masters in Development Economics from Australian National University.

== Career ==
Khan served as director at WTO Cell, Ministry of Commerce in 2012. Khan served as a counselor at the Bangladesh High Commission in the United Kingdom from 2012 to 2017. Apart from that, she worked in Ministry of Agriculture, Bangladesh Public Administration Training Centre (BPATC) and Dhaka Deputy Commissioner's Office.

In 2020, Khan was the additional secretary (development) of the Ministry of Commerce. She argued against a free trade agreement with China. She is an ex-officio director of Bangladesh Infrastructure Finance Fund Limited. Khan was a member of the Planning Commission. She is serving as secretary at the Economic Relations Division.

Khan was promoted to Senior Secretary on 30 October 2023. She was appointed as the Alternate Executive Director of the World Bank on 10 March 2024. Her appointment was cancelled after the Bangladesh Nationalist Party came to power in 2026.
