= Md Abdur Rahman Khan =

Bangladeshi civil servant

- মো. আব্দুর রহমান খান
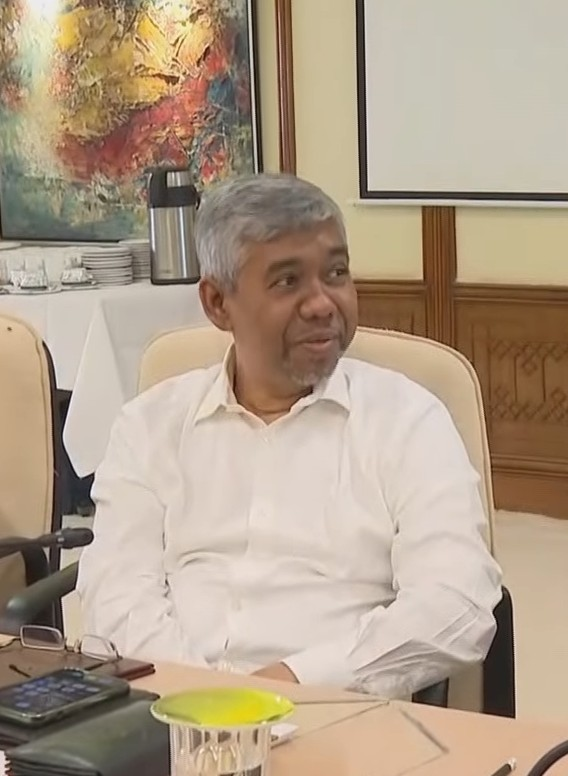
- Khan in 2024

Secretary of Internal Resources Division; and; Chairman of the National Board of Revenue
- In office 14 August 2024 – 29 June 2026
- Preceded by: Abu Hena Md. Rahmatul Muneem

Md Abdur Rahman Khan is a Bangladeshi retired civil servant, who has served as the Secretary of Internal Resources Division and the Chairman of the National Board of Revenue. Prior to his current position, he served as the secretary of the Financial Institutions Division.

As NBR chairman, Khan has faced criticism for his handling of a controversial restructuring plan that came under censure from Transparency International Bangladesh and the Centre for Policy Dialogue. The TIB and the CPD criticized the dissolution of the NBR and the creation of two ministerial divisions as an act of executive capture of the revenue sector, arguing that it sparked an unnecessary bureaucratic turf war and demonstrated favoritism toward the administration cadre.

== Early life ==
Khan was born in Lakshmipur district. He earned his bachelor's and master's degrees in accounting from the University of Chittagong. He also holds a second master's degree from Ulster University.

== Career ==
Khan joined the Bangladesh Civil Service on 25 April 1994 as a taxation cadre.

Khan worked as an international advisor to the World Bank in East Timor.

In January 2023, Khan was elected President of the Institute of Cost and Management Accountants of Bangladesh while serving as an additional secretary at the Ministry of Finance.

Khan was appointed secretary of the Financial Institutions Division of the Ministry of Finance in May 2024 replacing Sheikh Mohammad Salim Ullah who was set to retire. He was the previous chief of the Administration and Treasury and Debt Management Wing.

After the fall of the Sheikh Hasina led Awami League government, Khan was appointed chairman of the National Board of Revenue on 15 August 2024. He replaced the contractually appointed chairman, Abu Hena Md. Rahmatul Muneem, after his contract was terminated. There were protests at the National Board of Revenue by employees demanding the removal of Muneem.
