= ECNEC =

Executive committee of the Government of Bangladesh

Executive Committee of the National Economic Council (ECNEC) (Bangladesh)
- জাতীয় অর্থনৈতিক পরিষদের নির্বাহী কমিটি (ইসিএনইসি)

Agency overview
- Formed: 1982
- Preceding agency: Cabinet Division (supporting body, 1972)
- Type: Executive Committee
- Jurisdiction: Government of Bangladesh
- Headquarters: NEC Conference Room, Sher-e-Bangla Nagar, Dhaka, Bangladesh
- Ministers responsible: Tarique Zia, Prime Minister of Bangladesh (Chairperson); Mirza Fakhrul Islam Alamgir, LGRD Minister (Alternate Chairperson)
- Parent department: Cabinet Division
- Website: plandiv.gov.bd

The Executive Committee of the National Economic Council (ECNEC) is an executive committee under the Cabinet Division of the Government of Bangladesh, which verifies, imports, approves and advances nationally important development projects, regardless of the economic status and economic activities in Bangladesh. Provides formulation, review and approval. Meetings of the ECNEC are usually held in the NEC conference room in Sher-e-Bangla Nagar under the Planning Department, Planning Commission.

== History ==
In 1972, the Cabinet Division was formed as a division under the Ministry of Cabinet Affairs to provide secretarial support to the cabinet of the Bangladesh government. According to the data obtained, the decision of the Council of Ministers was decided on the structure and functions of the Executive Committee of the National Economic Council in 1982. In 1982, a committee was convened to convene the Minister of Finance and Planning. The committee also included ministers of industry and commerce, ministers of the ministry and ministers of the concerned ministries.

After the restoration of democracy in Bangladesh, the finance minister of the elected government became President of ECNEC in September 1991. In October of the same year, the head of the government of ECNEC became president. In the latest notification issued on 26 January, the Minister of Planning / State was excluded from the list of members of ECNEC. The last notification regarding the functioning of ECNEC was issued on 15 January 2014.

== Structures and tasks ==
According to the latest Gazette of the Government of Bangladesh published in 2014, the Chairman of the Committee of the ECNEC will be the Honorable Prime Minister of the Government of Bangladesh. In their absence, the finance minister will be the chairman of the ECNEC meeting. The following is a list of the members of this committee.
