= Customs, Excise and VAT Appellate Tribunal =

Bangladeshi government tribunal

- Formation: 1 October 1995
- Headquarters: Dhaka, Bangladesh
- Region served: Bangladesh
- Official language: Bengali
- Website: cevt.gov.bd

Customs, Excise and VAT Appellate Tribunal (Bengali: Homeকাস্টমস, এক্সাইজ ও ভ্যাট আপিলাত ট্রাইব্যুনাল) is a Bangladesh government quasi-judicial tribunal that holds hearing on tax related disputes.

Customs, Excise and VAT Appellate Tribunal is under the National Board of Revenue.

== History ==
Customs, Excise and VAT Appellate Tribunal was established on 1 October 1995. The verdicts of the tribunal can be appealed to the High Court Division. It is composed of one tax officer and one judge, one of whom will be the president of the tribunal.

Matiur Rahman, president of the Customs, Excise and VAT Appellate Tribunal, was removed from office on 23 June 2024 following allegations of corruption against him in the media. The Anti-Corruption Commission created a three member investigation committee.
