= Khairuzzaman Chowdhury =

Khairuzzaman Chowdhury is the Chairman of the National Board of Revenue. He was first and only Tax Ombudsman of Bangladesh.

== Career ==
On 9 September 2003, Chowdhury was appointed the chairman of the National Board of Revenue replacing Shoaib Ahmed. He previously served as the secretary of the Ministry of Food. He increased tax revenue collection during his term as chairman. He was the first person to be appointed chairman of the National Board of Revenue on a contractual basis. He launched operations against black money after the amnesty period announced by the Bangladesh Nationalist Party government ended. He proposed anti-dumping laws to protect domestic industries. Chowdhury was the chairman of the National Board of Revenue till 6 July 2006. Partex Group vice chairman Aziz AI Kaiser Tito gifted him a Rolex which he deposited with the government treasury and expressed embarrassment at the expensive gift. Md. Abdul Karim replaced him as the chairman of the National Board of Revenue.

Chowdhury was appointed the first Tax Ombudsman of Bangladesh in 2006. He was given the rank and privilege of a judge of the Bangladesh High Court. The office was created after the Bangladesh Nationalist Party led government passed the Tax Ombudsman Act, 2005 after being proposed by M. Saifur Rahman, Minister of Finance. He submitted his first report in April 2007 to President Iajuddin Ahmed at the Bangabhaban. National Board of Revenue ordered its staff to cooperate with Chowdhury in 2008 to improve services which had been poorly received in 2007.

In September 2010, Chowdhury's term as the Tax Ombudsman ended and the Awami League government abolished the office through the Tax Ombudsman (Abolition) Bill-2010. The decision to abolish the office was criticized by the media and civil society.
