= Revenue Management Division =

Proposed Bangladeshi government agency

- Government Seal of Bangladesh
- Abbreviation: RMD
- Formation: 12 May 2025 (de jure)
- Type: Government agency Ministerial division
- Legal status: Proposed
- Region served: Bangladesh
- Official language: Bengali
- De facto in-charge: Md Abdur Rahman Khan
- Main organ: Presumptive: Bangladesh Customs; Dhaka Custom House; Chittagong Custom House; National Savings Directorate
- Parent organization: Ministry of Finance
- Affiliations: Government of Bangladesh

Revenue Management Division (Bengali: রাজস্ব ব্যবস্থাপনা বিভাগ) is a proposed ministerial division of the Ministry of Finance of the Bangladesh government.

== History ==
On 25 April 2025, the interim government issued a presidential ordinance to restructure the National Board of Revenue. The ordinance, which states that the existing NBR will be dissolved and replaced by two new divisions under the Ministry of Finance, one being the Revenue Policy Division and another being the Revenue Management Division. Accordingly on 13 May 2025, the government dissolved NBR and created RMD, through Revenue Policy and Revenue Management Ordinance, 2025. The ordinance stated that then existing personnel of NBR would be absorbed into RMD. Officers of Income Tax and Customs cadres protested the discussion and called for revocation.

== Activities ==
According to the ordinance, the activities of the division include the implementation of necessary laws and customs related international treaties, expansion and collection of revenues, formulation of revenue management policies, coordination among revenue departments and to oversee auditory and investigative works of revenue.

== Criticism ==
The interim government created the division by a hastily promulgated ordinance in 2025, drawing flak from Transparency International Bangladesh, which criticized the move as executive capture of the revenue sector. Debapriya Bhattacharya of the Centre for Policy Dialogue also criticized the move on similar grounds.
