= National Board of Revenue =

Bangladeshi national revenue authority

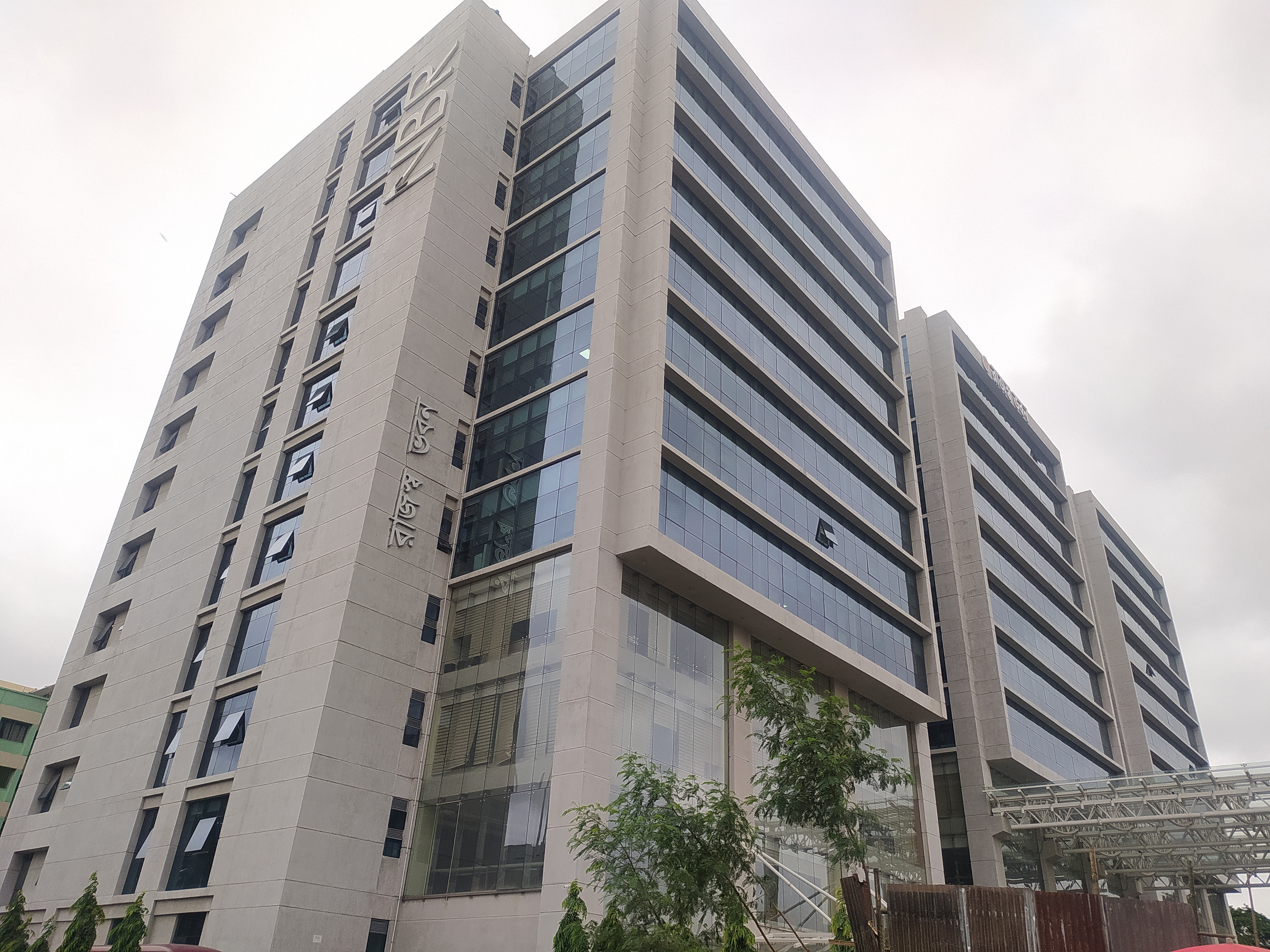
- National Board of Revenue Building in Dhaka, Bangladesh
- Abbreviation: NBR
- Successor: Proposed: Revenue Management Division; Revenue Policy Division
- Formation: 1972
- Type: Tax administration
- Headquarters: Agargaon, Dhaka, Bangladesh
- Coordinates: 23.7357°N 90.4089°E
- Official language: Bangla and English
- Chairman: Md Abdur Rahman Khan
- Parent organization: Internal Resources Division, Ministry of Finance
- Staff: 3,434 officers and 10,195 supporting staff positions
- Website: nbr.gov.bd

The National Board of Revenue (NBR; Bengali: জাতীয় রাজস্ব বোর্ড) is the central authority for tax administration in Bangladesh. It is a statutory authority attached with the Internal Resources Division of the Ministry of Finance. The NBR collects almost 97% of tax revenue and almost 85% of total revenue for the Bangladesh government.

The finance ministry proposed dissolving the NBR and creating two ministerial divisions—the Revenue Management Division and the Revenue Policy Division—through a hastily promulgated ordinance in 2025. The ordinance drew criticism from Transparency International Bangladesh, which denounced the move as executive capture of the revenue sector. TIB stated that the move risked politicizing the revenue sector, undermined the autonomy of the revenue service, and reduced accountability, transparency, and neutrality. Debapriya Bhattacharya of the Centre for Policy Dialogue also criticized the move on similar grounds.

== History ==
The National Board of Revenue was established in 1972 through the National Board of Revenue Order, 1972. Later, the structure of the National Board of Revenue was amended through Act No 12 of 2009. The Customs, Excise and VAT Appellate Tribunal was a tribunal under the National Board of Revenue established in 1995.

The National Board of Revenue provided carnet de passage for tourists despite Bangladesh not being a signatory to the relevant United Nations treaties. From 2018, the National Board of Revenue started to sought taxes from Facebook, Google, and YouTube following requests by Newspaper Owners' Association of Bangladesh.

On 25 April 2025, the interim government issued a presidential ordinance to restructure the board. The ordinance, which states that the existing NBR will be dissolved and replaced by two new divisions under the Ministry of Finance, one being the Revenue Policy Division (RPD) and another being the Revenue Management Division (RMD). Accordingly on 13 May 2025, the government dissolved NBR and split into two RPD and RMD, through Revenue Policy and Revenue Management Ordinance, 2025. According to the ordinance, where RPD's work would be to monitor the implementation of tax laws and the tax collection situation, the RMD's work would be to collect revenues. The ordinance stated that existing personnel of NBR would be absorbed into RMD. Officers of Income Tax and Customs cadres protested the discussion and called for revocation. However, the ordinance has not yet been implemented due to strong opposition, and the government is now considering amendments to the proposal.

On 29 June 2025, the Port of Chittagong, Bangladesh's largest shipping terminal, closed due to a strike by NBR employees protesting against the agency's splitting. The port reopened the next day following negotiations between the strikers and the finance ministry.

== Structure ==
The NBR had one chairperson and eight members - four for direct tax and four for indirect tax. The secretary of internal resources division acted as the ex-officio chairman of the board. There were 45 departments/directorates under the NBR, of which 25 were related to direct tax and 20 related to indirect tax.

== List of chairmen ==
| No. | Name | Start date | End date | Ref |
|---|---|---|---|---|
| 1. | Nurul Islam | 28 January 1972 | 10 March 1972 | |
| 2. | Kofil Jddin Mahmud | 11 March 1972 | 12 October 1973 | |
| 3. | M. Wazed Ali Khan | 12 October 1973 | 19 March 1974 | |
| 4. | K. M. Moshraff Hossain | 19 March 1974 | 14 February 1980 | |
| 5. | A. K. Azizul Haque | 14 February 1980 | 31 December 1982 | |
| 6. | S. B. Chowdhury | 1 January 1983 | 13 July 1987 | |
| 7. | A. K. M. Aminul Haque Chowdhury | 14 July 1987 | 1 July 1989 | |
| 8. | Ekram Hossain | 1 July 1989 | 31 July 1990 | |
| 9. | A. K. M. Aminul Haque Chowdhury | 1 August 1990 | 30 December 1992 | |
| 10. | Nurul Husain Khan | 19 January 1991 | 29 April 1992 | |
| 11. | A. K. M. Mosiur Rahman | 2 May 1992 | 12 February 1993 | |
| 12. | Akbar Ali Khan | 18 February 1993 | 27 November 1995 | |
| 13. | Sadat Hussain | 27 November 1995 | 12 February 1997 | |
| 14. | Shah Abdul Hannan | 12 February 1997 | 15 February 1998 | |
| 15. | Saiful Islam Khan | 15 February 1998 | 15 March 1998 | |
| 16. | A. K. M. Mosiur Rahman | 15 March 1998 | 5 August 1998 | |
| 17. | Abdul Muyeed Chowdhury | 5 August 1998 | 31 July 2000 | |
| 18. | Zakir Ahmed Khan | 1 August 2000 | 10 July 2001 | |
| 19. | Shoaib Ahmed | 10 July 2001 | 9 September 2003 | |
| 20. | Khairuzzaman Chowdhury | 9 September 2003 | 6 July 2006 | |
| 21. | Md. Abdul Karim | 9 July 2006 | 6 December 2006 | |
| 22. | A. F. M. Solaiman Chowdhury | 10 December 2006 | 28 December 2006 | |
| 23. | Sheikh A. K. Motahar Hossain | 9 January 2007 | 22 January 2007 | |
| 24. | Badiur Rahman | 23 January 2007 | 22 October 2007 | |
| 25. | Muhammad Abdul Mazid | 22 October 2007 | 8 April 2009 | |
| 26. | Nasiruddin Ahmed | 8 April 2009 | 29 October 2012 | |
| 27. | Ghulam Hussain | 29 October 2012 | 8 January 2015 | |
| 28. | Md. Nojibur Rahman | 12 January 2015 | 31 December 2017 | |
| 29. | Md. Mosharraf Hossain Bhuiyan | 4 January 2018 | 2 January 2018 | |
| 30. | Abu Hena Md. Rahmatul Muneem | 6 January 2020 | 14 August 2024 | |
| 31. | Md Abdur Rahman Khan | 15 August 2024 | Present | |

== See also ==
- Income Tax Intelligence and Investigation Unit
