= Financial Management Reform Programme =

- Formation: 1 March 2003
- Headquarters: Dhaka, Bangladesh
- Region served: Bangladesh
- Official language: Bengali
- Website: www.dos.gov.bd

Financial Management Reform Programme (আর্থিক ব্যবস্থাপনা সংস্কার প্রোগ্রাম) is a Programme under the Finance Division of Ministry of Finance of Government of Bangladesh.

== History ==
Financial Management Reform Programme was established by the Government of Bangladesh with the support of Department for International Development. It started function from 1 March 2003.
