= Abu Hena Md. Rahmatul Muneem =

Senior Secretary, Internal Resources Division and Chairman, National Board of Revenue
- In office 6 January 2020 – 14 August 2024
- Prime Minister: Sheikh Hasina
- Preceded by: Md Mosharraf Hossain Bhuiyan
- Succeeded by: Md Abdur Rahman Khan

Senior Secretary Energy and Mineral Resources Division
- In office 9 May 2018 – 5 January 2020
- Minister: Nasrul Hamid (State Minister)
- Preceded by: Nazimuddin Chowdhury
- Succeeded by: Md. Anisur Rahman

Personal details
- Born: 5 January 1961 (age 65) Sirajganj Sadar, Sirajganj District, Bangladesh
- Spouse: Laila Jesmin
- Education: University of Dhaka
- Profession: Government official

Abu Hena Md. Rahmatul Muneem is a retired Bangladeshi government official who served as Senior Secretary of Internal Resources Division and the Chairman of the National Board of Revenue and a director of Bangladesh Bank from 6 January 2020 to 14 August 2024.

== Early life ==
Muneem was born in Sirajganj District. He did his undergraduate and graduate studies in geology at the University of Dhaka. He has a Master of Business Administration from Northern University, Bangladesh. He is married to Laila Jesmin.

== Career ==
Muneem started his career in the Bangladesh Civil Service on 21 January 1986 as an administration cadre and worked as an upazila nirbahi officer.

Muneem has also worked as additional district magistrate and divisional commissioner of Barisal Division. He had served as the chairman of Gas Transmission Company Limited and Bangladesh Petroleum Corporation.

Muneem served as the senior secretary in the Energy and Mineral Resources Division till January 2020. On 6 January 2020, he was appointed chairman of the National Board of Revenue. He replaced Md Mosharraf Hossain Bhuiyan.

After the fall of the Sheikh Hasina-led Awami League government, a murder case was filed against Muneem by Bangladesh Nationalist Party politician Mohammad Zaman Hossain Khan over the death of a protestor in July 2024.
