= Sheikh Mohammad Salim Ullah =

Sheikh Mohammad Salim Ullah is a Bangladesh civil servant and secretary of the Ministry of Finance. He is in-charge of the Financial Institutions Division at the Ministry of Finance. He served under Finance Minister AHM Mustafa Kamal.

== Early life ==
Ullah was born in Feni District. He did his undergraduate and graduate studies in finance at the University of Dhaka.

== Career ==
Ullah joined the Bangladesh Civil Service in 1991 as an assistant commissioner. He worked as the assistant commissioner of land and Upazila Nirbahi Officer.

In August 2021, Ullah was promoted to secretary and appointed head of the Financial Institutions Division. He was serving as the additional secretary of the Finance Division of the Ministry of Finance. He replaced Senior Secretary Ashadul Islam as the head of the Financial Institutions Division. He is the deputy chairman of UAE-Bangladesh Investment Company Limited. He is a director of Bangladesh Bank. He was part of the Bangladeshi delegation that meet Antoinette Sayeh, Deputy Managing Director of the International Monetary Fund, in Dhaka.

Ullah has called on bankers to take actions on money laundering. He is a director of the Microcredit Regulatory Authority. He called on microfinance institutions to provide more loans to low income individuals. During his time a schism developed between the Ministry of Finance and Bangladesh Bank over control. Bangladesh Bank was being treated like a department of the ministry and its officials were being appointed by the ministry limiting the freedom of the central bank.
