= National Savings Certificates (Bangladesh) =

National Savings Certificate in Bangladesh encompasses different types of savings schemes operated by National Savings Department, Bangladesh. It is supervised by Internal Resources Division of Ministry of Finance of Government of Bangladesh. Every year the profit margins of these schemes are declared after cutting the 5% source tax. These certificates are sold and encased in the post offices in Bangladesh.

== Schemes under National Saving Certificates ==
Key schemed under National Saving Certificates are as follows,

1. Family Saving Certificates - This is a 5-year saving scheme also known as Paribar Sanchaypatra. Designed specifically for the women, any adult woman (age more than 18 years) can invest in Paribar Sachaypatra with minimum purchase of Tk 10000/- with maximum limit of Tk 45,00,000/-. This five year scheme typically provides a return of around 12.2% if enchashed after maturity.
2. Pensioner Saving Certificates- This scheme is also known as Pensioner Sanchaypatra. All the retired government and semi-government employees having minimum employment period of 20 years can invest in this scheme. Typical returns are around 12.2% for withdrawal after 5 years and varying degree of returns for premature withdrawal based on the number of years of investment in the scheme.
3. Quarterly Profit based Savings - This scheme is also known as Tin Mash ontor munafa vittik sanchaypatra that requires minimum investment of Tk 1,00,000/- and has a maturity period of 3 years. The maximum investment is limited to Tk 30,00,000/- for a single owner and Tk 60,00,000/- for a joint owner. Typical returns are around 11.8% for the complete tenure of 3 years and varying degree of returns for premature withdrawal depending upon the years of investment.
4. Bangladesh Saving Certificates- This five year saving scheme provides return of around 12.2% at maturity with varying degree of returns for premature withdrawal depending on the duration of investment. Maximum allowable investment in this scheme is capped to Tk 30,00,000/- for individual investors and Tk 60,00,000/- for joint investors.
5. Wage Earner's Saving Certificates- This 5 year scheme provides returns of around 11.8% at the end of the maturation period. All the expatriate Bangladeshis and their beneficiaries can invest in this scheme.

== Criticism ==
It has been pointed out that NSCs (National Saving Certificates) give returns significantly higher than the banks considering inflation. This discourages the people from investing in high risk instruments like stocks. There is a general concern that high return rate in NSCs along with rise in number of investors will cause a significant liability to the government. The Centre for Policy Dialogue (CPD) has asked interest rate to be decreased on saving certificates and the International Monetary Fund (IMF) have asked the government to eventually phase them out.

With increase in pension of the government employees, National Savings Department proposed to increase the maximum limit for investments in the pensioner saving certificates. This move has been criticized as unjust for the employees retired from the private organizations. Meanwhile, despite the government's attempts to draw investments into national savings certificates (NSCs) by offering higher interest rates, net sales of NSCs have remained negative, down by Taka 74.31 billion as of April 2025. People simply cannot afford to lock in their scarce savings amid persistent inflation exceeding 9%. The purchasing power crisis has driven households to liquidate existing NSCs to meet daily expenses.
