= Ministry of Finance (Bangladesh) =

Government ministry of Bangladesh

- অর্থ মন্ত্রণালয়
- Government Seal of Bangladesh

Ministry overview
- Formed: 14 April 1971; 55 years ago
- Jurisdiction: Government of Bangladesh
- Headquarters: Bangladesh Secretariat, Dhaka
- Annual budget: ৳323797 crore (US$26 billion) (2026-2027)
- Minister responsible: Amir Khasru Mahmud Chowdhury, Minister of Finance
- Ministry executives: Md Abdur Rahman Khan, Senior Secretary, Sharifa Khan, Senior Secretary, Economic Relations Division; Khairuzzaman Mozumder, Secretary, Finance Division; Sheikh Mohammad Salim Ullah, Secretary, Financial Institutions Division
- Child agencies: Finance Division; Economic Relations Division; Revenue Policy Division; Revenue Management Division; Financial Institutions Division
- Website: mof.gov.bd

The Ministry of Finance (Bengali: অর্থ মন্ত্রণালয়, romanized: Artha Montronaloy) is a ministry of the Government of Bangladesh responsible for financial management, economic policy, and fiscal administration. It serves as the principal government body overseeing the country’s budget, taxation, public expenditure, and financial regulations.

Critics have raised concerns about executive overreach by secretaries in the banking and revenue sectors, alleging their involvement in financial mismanagement. These issues reportedly include large-scale bank loan fraud, money laundering schemes, and the politicization of financial institutions. Such systemic problems have allegedly contributed to substantial capital flight, with reports estimating that up to $240 billion has been illicitly transferred abroad over the past 15 years.

== Divisions ==
- Finance Division
  - Office of the Controller General of Accounts
  - Investment Corporation of Bangladesh
  - The Security Printing Corporation (Bangladesh) Ltd.
  - Financial Management Reform Program
  - Comptroller and Auditor General of Bangladesh
  - Bangladesh House Building Finance Corporation
  - Pay and Services Commission
  - National Savings Certificate
- Economic Relations Division
- Revenue Policy Division
- Revenue Management Division
  - Bangladesh Customs (presumptive)
  - Benapole Custom House (presumptive)
  - Dhaka Custom House (presumptive)
  - Chittagong Custom House (presumptive)
  - Mongla Custom House (presumptive)
  - National Savings Directorate (presumptive)
- Financial Institutions Division
  - Dhaka Stock Exchange
  - Chittagong Stock Exchange
  - Palli Karma-Sahayak Foundation
  - Bangladesh Institute of Bank Management
  - Bangladesh Bank
  - Bangladesh House Building Finance Corporations
  - Bangladesh Securities and Exchange Commission
  - Bangladesh Insurance Development and Regulatory Authority
  - Microcredit Regulatory Authority
  - Sonali Bank Limited
  - Agrani Bank Limited
  - Rupali Bank Limited
  - Janata Bank Limited
  - Bangladesh Krishi Bank
  - Rajshahi Krishi Unnayan Bank
  - Sadharan Bima Corporation
  - Jiban Bima Corporation

== List of secretaries of finance ==
List of Tenures
No.	Name	Tenure	Reference
1	Khandaker Asaduzzaman	22 April 1971 to 16 January 1972	
2	M. Motiul Islam	17 January 1972 to 11 October 1973	
3	Kofil Uddin Mahmud	12 October 1973 to 6 February 1976	
4	M. Saiduzzaman	6 February 1976 to 1 July 1977	
5	S.A. Khair	1 July 1977 to 6 February 1980	
6	Golam Kibria	6 February 1980 to 24 October 1982	
7	M. Saiduzzaman	24 October 1982 to 8 January 1984	
8	M. Mustafizur Rahman	5 February 1984 to 12 January 1987	
9	Golam Kibria	1 February 1987 to 31 December 1988	
10	M.K. Anwar	1 January 1989 to 31 December 1989	
11	Khorshed Alam	2 January 1990 to 13 January 1992	
12	Nasim Uddin Ahmed	14 January 1992 to 22 November 1995	
13	Akbar Ali Khan	23 November 1995 to 30 June 2001	
14	Zakir Ahmed Khan	1 July 2001 to 31 July 2005	
15	Siddiqur Rahman Chowdhury	1 August 2005 to 21 January 2007	
16	Mohammad Tarek	22 January 2007 to 31 July 2012	
17	Fazle Kabir	1 August 2012 to 3 July 2014	
18	Mahbub Ahmed	6 July 2014 to 28 February 2017	
19	Hedayetullah Al Mamoon	1 March 2017 to 3 October 2017	
20	Mohammad Muslim Chowdhury	3 October 2017 to 17 July 2018	
21	Abdur Rouf Talukder	17 July 2018 to 11 July 2022	
22	Fatima Yasmin	17 July 2022 to 28 August 2023	
23	Md Khairuzzaman Mozumder	29 August 2023 to present	

== See also ==
- Financial Management Reform Programme
- Cabinet Committee on Public Purchase
