= Revenue Policy Division =

Proposed Bangladeshi government agency

- Government Seal of Bangladesh
- Abbreviation: RPD
- Formation: 12 May 2025 (de jure)
- Type: Government agency Ministral division
- Legal status: Proposed
- Region served: Bangladesh
- Official language: Bengali
- Parent organization: Ministry of Finance
- Affiliations: Government of Bangladesh

Revenue Policy Division (Bengali: রাজস্ব নীতি বিভাগ) is a proposed ministerial division of the Ministry of Finance of the Bangladesh government. The division is to established along with Revenue Management Division after dissolving the National Board of Revenue.

== History ==
On 25 April 2025, the interim government issued a presidential ordinance to restructure the National Board of Revenue. The ordinance, which states that the existing NBR will be dissolved and replaced by two new divisions under the Ministry of Finance, one being the Revenue Policy Division and another being the Revenue Management Division. Accordingly, on 13 May 2025, the government dissolved NBR and created RMD, through Revenue Policy and Revenue Management Ordinance, 2025. Officers of Income Tax and Customs cadres protested the discussion and called for revocation.

== Activities ==
According to the ordinance, the activities of the division include creation of a sustainable taxation system, formulation and correction of stamp law, definition and formulation of duties, taxes, tariffs, VATs and service charges, assessment of bilateral customs policies and agreements, assessment and research of revenue policy and noticing of revenue related activities.

== Criticism ==
The government's decision to create two new ministerial divisions drew flak from Transparency International Bangladesh and the Centre for Policy Dialogue. The TIB criticized the move to split the NBR into two ministerial divisions as the executive capture of the revenue sector.
