= Mahmoud Kafil Uddin =

Bangladeshi politician

Kafiluddin Mahmood was a Bangladeshi administrator and minister in the Shahabuddin Ahmed Cabinet.

== Career ==
Uddin started his career in the Pakistan Civil Service. He served as the finance secretary of Bangladesh. He was the former chairman of the National Board of Revenue. He served as the adviser in charge of the Ministry of Finance in the Shahabuddin Ahmed caretaker government.

== Death ==
Uddin died on 7 January 2011.
