= Department of National Savings =

- Formation: 1971
- Headquarters: Dhaka, Bangladesh
- Region served: Bangladesh
- Official language: Bengali
- Website: Department of National Savings

Department of National Savings is a government department that acts as the National Saving Bank of Bangladesh and is responsible for issuing saving certificates. It is located in Dhaka, Bangladesh.

== History ==
Department of National Savings traces its origins to the National Savings Institute which was founded in 1944 under the Ministry of Finance (India). It was headquartered in Simla, British India. After the Partition of India the National Savings Institute was managed by the Ministry of Finance (Pakistan). After the Independence of Bangladesh in 1971, the government of Bangladesh created the Directorate of National Savings which absorbed the functions of the National Savings Institute. In 2014 the Directorate of National Savings was upgraded to a full department. The Department of National Savings is attached to the Internal Resources Division under the Bangladesh Ministry of Finance.

== Function ==
The department sells saving certificates to the general public. The government pays interest on the saving certificate and they are considered government liabilities. Investors prefer saving certificates due to a lack of faith in Banks. The government has attempted to decrease the sales of saving certificates through raising interests.
