= Finance Division =

- Headquarters: Dhaka, Bangladesh
- Region served: Bangladesh
- Official language: Bengali
- Website: Finance Division

Finance Division (Bengali: অর্থ বিভাগ) is a Bangladesh government division under the Ministry of Finance responsible for controlling government expenditure and budget. Muslim Chowdhury is the head of the division.

== History ==
The workload of the Finance Division was reduced in 2010 and some its responsibilities were placed under the newly created Bank and Financial Institutions Division. In June 2018, the division increased the power of project directors over their finance to increase the pace of project expenditure.
