= Economic Relations Division (Bangladesh) =

Government division of Bangladesh

- অর্থনৈতিক সম্পর্ক বিভাগ

Division overview
- Formed: 1976
- Jurisdiction: Government of Bangladesh
- Headquarters: Dhaka, Bangladesh
- Minister responsible: Amir Khasru Mahmud Chowdhury
- Division executive: Md. Shahriar Kader Siddiky, Secretary
- Parent department: Ministry of Finance
- Website: erd.gov.bd

The Economic Relations Division (ERD) is one of the four divisions of the Ministry of Finance, of the Government of the People's Republic of Bangladesh.

== Structure ==
- Wing-1: Japan and America
- Wing-2: World Bank
- Wing-3: Administration and Middle East
- Wing-4: United Nations
- Wing-5: Asian Development Bank
- Wing-6: Coordination and Nordic
- Wing-7: Europe
- Wing-8: Asia, JEC and F&F
- Wing-9: Foreign Aid Budget and Accounts (FABA)
- Wing-10: Development Effectiveness

== See also ==
Bangladesh Development Forum
