= Financial Institutions Division =

Bangladesh government financial division

- Formation: 2010
- Headquarters: Dhaka, Bangladesh
- Region served: Bangladesh
- Official language: Bengali
- Website: fid.gov.bd

The Financial Institutions Division (Bengali: আর্থিক প্রতিষ্ঠান বিভাগ) is a Bangladesh government division under the Ministry of Finance responsible for managing all state owned banks, financial institutions, and stock exchanges. Md. Sheikh Mohammad Salim Ullah is the head of the division.

== History ==
Financial Institutions Division on 8 June 2010 by taking over some of the responsibilities of the Finance Division.
