= Matiur Rahman (tax official) =

Matiur Rahman is a Bangladeshi civil servant who served as a member of the National Board of Revenue (NBR). In June 2024 he became the subject of media scrutiny and an Anti-Corruption Commission (ACC) inquiry into his wealth after his son purchased a 1.2 million taka goat. NBR officials have also said that he used his connections to prevent or reverse official transfers.

== Career ==
Rahman joined government service in the trade cadre in 1994 and was moved to the customs service on deputation in 1998. He served at several National Board of Revenue postings that many tax officials regard as lucrative. These included the Chittagong Custom House, the Benapole Custom House, the Large Taxpayer Unit, and the Customs, Excise and VAT Commissionerates in Dhaka and Chattogram.

During the 2007 caretaker government, NBR chairman Badiur Rahman ordered Rahman's transfer from the Chittagong Customs House to the VAT Commissionerate in Rajshahi. In a television talk show in 2024, Badiur said that Rahman approached him at his office and at his home after the order was issued, and that he declined to meet him. Badiur also said that Bangladesh Army chief Moeen U Ahmed and three other army officers contacted him asking that the transfer be stopped. He said he refused to withdraw the order and told the army chief that he could be transferred himself instead. Badiur was subsequently moved to another post, and Rahman was back at the Chittagong Customs House within a month.

In February 2022, the government appointed Rahman to the board of directors of Sonali Bank. NBR officials said this was done without the consent of the NBR chairman or clearance from the tax authority. The officials said Rahman was one of 13 officials included in a routine round of transfers that year. The other 12 took up their new posts, but Rahman did not.

In July 2022, NBR chairman Abu Hena Md. Rahmatul Muneem ordered Rahman transferred from the Customs, Excise and VAT Appellate Tribunal to the Rajshahi VAT Commissionerate. Rahman did not take up the post, and a new order cancelling the transfer was issued within 15 days. Several senior NBR officials, speaking anonymously, said Rahman had friends in influential positions, whom he hosted at resorts owned by him or his family. They attributed the cancellation of at least two transfer orders to these connections.

=== Goat scandal ===
Rahman's finances drew public attention after his son posted on social media a photograph of a sacrificial goat said to be worth 1.2 million taka. The post went viral and prompted questions about the family's sources of wealth. Rahman publicly denied that Ifat was his son. Several mainstream media outlets subsequently reported on the family's wealth and lifestyle. The Anti-Corruption Commission (ACC) opened an inquiry into his wealth in June 2024. At least four complaints had been filed with the commission against him over the years, but it had not opened an investigation previously.

In July 2024, an analysis by The Daily Star examined the shareholdings of Rahman and his relatives in at least 15 listed companies. The newspaper reported that they had acquired at least 9.8 crore placement shares, meaning shares sold privately to selected investors before a company's initial public offering. About 63.5 percent were held in individual names and the rest through five family-linked companies, which were established or acquired between 2013 and 2018, when Rahman held senior NBR posts. Assuming a face value of 10 taka per share, the newspaper estimated the purchase cost at no less than 1.01 billion taka.

In a NTV interview on 19 June 2024, Rahman said he advised company owners on improving their businesses and preparing IPOs, and received placement shares in return. The Daily Star said that government service rules bar officials from speculative trading, and described the acquisitions as insider trading. Former BSEC chairman Faruq Ahmed Siddiqi said that Rahman's consultancy arrangement breached rules for government employees and that trading while holding such sensitive information amounted to insider trading.

In his interview, Rahman said he began investing in the stock market in 2008 and used his knowledge of the capital market to buy shares in struggling companies with growth potential, selling them once prices rose. He said he also advised companies on preparing initial public offerings (IPOs). The Daily Star reported, from company prospectuses, that he also held pre-IPO shares in companies including ACME Pesticides, Associated Oxygen, C&A Textiles, Dominage Steel, Lub-rref (Bangladesh), Mamun Agro Products, ML Dyeing, Ring-Shine and SK Trims. The largest holdings it identified in his own name were 88.83 lakh shares in SK Trims and 37 lakh in ACME Pesticides. Rahman, his two children and a family company held placement shares in Ring-Shine Textiles, which raised its paid-up capital from 9.95 crore taka to 285 crore taka before listing in 2019. The Bangladesh Securities and Exchange Commission later found that 11 sponsor directors and 33 outside shareholders had received shares without paying for them.

Questions were raised about how he obtained shares of Fortune Shoes at 8 taka each, below their 10 taka face value, before the company listed in 2016. The Daily Star noted that companies cannot normally sell shares at a discount without special approval from the High Court. Analysts quoted by the newspaper said that companies are often pressured to give shares, sometimes at a discount and sometimes free, to influential people, and that some companies use placement shares to win favourable treatment from authorities and regulators. They said such transactions do not appear in company financial reports, but that auditors or regulators could trace them through the fund transfers used to pay for the shares. The newspaper reported that Rahman received more than 3 crore placement shares from ten listed companies. The BSEC had earlier found that many recipients of Ring-Shine Textiles shares lacked documentation showing that they had paid for them, and the names of several influential people were made public in 2021.

On 23 June 2024, Rahman was transferred to the Internal Resources Division of the Ministry of Finance. On 24 June 2024, the government removed him from the Sonali Bank board of directors. After an appeal by the ACC, the Metropolitan Senior Special Judge's Court in Dhaka imposed a travel ban on Rahman and two members of his family. On 2 July 2024, the ACC issued notices requiring Rahman, his two wives and his children by his first marriage to submit statements of their wealth. According to the notices, Rahman possessed substantial assets, in his own name and in the names of others, beyond his known sources of income. The recipients were required to disclose all movable and immovable assets and liabilities, their sources of income, and details of how the assets were acquired. On 31 July 2024, he took early retirement from government service.

In August 2026, Dhaka Divisional Special Judge BM Tariqul Kabir ordered the start of the corruption trail against Rahman and denied his bail petition. On 14 January 2025, Detective Branch detained him and his wife, Laila from Bashundhara Residential Area.

== Personal life ==
Rahman's first wife, Laila Kaniz Lucky, a retired associate professor of Bangla at Government Titumir College, became chairman of Raipura Upazila in Narsingdi District in December 2022 unopposed. According to The Daily Star, the affidavit she filed with the Bangladesh Election Commission before the 2024 upazila elections put her net worth at 103.1 million taka and her pension at about 465 thousand taka a year. The newspaper said that property valuations in the affidavit appeared much lower than market prices. It cited a flat in Bashundhara Residential Area, four flats in a Mirpur condominium and a plot in Dhaka as examples, and said her real wealth might be several times the declared figure. It also said that the affidavit did not mention her family home in Marjal village or her co-ownership of Wonder Park and Eco Resort in Narsingdi, which the resort confirmed was shared with two of Rahman's children. A local union council member told the newspaper that the resort had taken in parts of an adjacent community graveyard, and the newspaper reported finding three graves within the resort's boundary. The Daily Star also reported on a road in Raipura named after Lucky that leads to her home. They have two children together, Taufiqur Rahman Arnab and Farzana Rahman Ipshita. Ipshita lives in Toronto, Canada.

His second wife is Shammi Akhtar Shibli. They have one son, Mushfiqur Rahman Ifat, who had purchased the 1.2 million taka goat.
