= Internal Resources Division =

Bangladeshi government agency

- Formation: 21 April 1979
- Headquarters: Dhaka, Bangladesh
- Region served: Bangladesh
- Official language: Bengali
- Website: ird.gov.bd

Internal Resources Division (Bengali: অভ্যন্তরীণ সম্পদ বিভাগ) is a Bangladesh government division under the Ministry of Finance responsible for overseeing revenue collection in Bangladesh.

== History ==
Internal Resources Division was established on 21 April 1979 as part of a re-organization of the Ministry of Finance.

On 13 May 2025, the government initiated a plan through the Revenue Policy and Revenue Management Ordinance, 2025, to dissolve the National Board of Revenue (NBR) and redistribute its functions between two newly proposed entities — the Revenue Policy Division (RPD) and the Revenue Management Division (RMD). According to the ordinance, RPD would oversee the implementation of tax laws and monitor tax collection trends, while RMD would be tasked with revenue collection. However, due to strong opposition from various quarters, the restructuring process remains under implementation, and the government is currently reviewing the plan with the intent to introduce amendments to address the concerns raised.

== List of secretaries ==
List of Former Secretaries
Sl.	Name	Tenure (From)	Tenure (To)	Reference
1	A K Azizul Haque	14 February 1980	31 December 1982	
2	S B Chowdhury	1 January 1983	10 July 1987	
3	Chowdhury A K M Aminul Haque	14 July 1987	1 July 1989	
4	Ekram Hossain	1 July 1989	31 July 1990	
5	Chowdhury A K M Aminul Haque	1 August 1990	30 December 1990	
6	Nurul Hossain Khan	19 January 1991	29 April 1992	
7	A K M Moshior Rahman	2 May 1992	17 February 1993	
8	Akbar Ali Khan	18 February 1993	27 November 1995	
9	Sadat Hossain	27 November 1995	12 February 1997	
10	Shah Abdul Hannan	12 February 1997	15 February 1998	
11	A K M Moshior Rahman	15 March 1998	5 August 1998	
12	Abdul Muyeed Chowdhury	5 August 1998	31 July 2000	
13	Zakir Ahmed Khan	1 August 2000	10 July 2001	
14	Shoeb Ahmed	10 July 2001	9 September 2003	
15	Khairuzzaman Chowdhury	9 September 2003	6 July 2006	
16	Md Abdul Karim	9 July 2006	6 December 2006	
17	A F M Solaiman Chowdhury	10 December 2006	28 December 2007	
18	A K Motahar Hossain	9 January 2007	23 January 2007	
19	Sheikh Badiur Rahman	23 January 2007	22 October 2007	
20	Mohammad Abdul Mazid	22 October 2007	7 April 2009	
21	Nasir Uddin Ahmed	8 April 2009	29 October 2012	
22	Ghulam Hussain	29 October 2012	8 January 2015	
23	Md Nojibur Rahman	12 January 2015	31 December 2017	
24	Md Mosharraf Hossain Bhuiyan	4 January 2018	3 January 2020	
25	Abu Hena Md Rahmatul Munim	6 January 2020	14 August 2024	
26	Md Abdur Rahman Khan	15 August 2024	Present	
