= M Khairul Hossain =

Bangladeshi academic

M Khairul Hossain is a Bangladesh academic, Professor of Finance at the University of Dhaka, and had been the longest-serving head of Bangladesh Securities and Exchange Commission.

== Early life ==
Hossain completed his bachelor's degree and Masters in Economics from Plekhanov Russian University of Economics in 1978 and 1979 respectively. In 1983, he completed his PhD from Plekhanov Russian University of Economics. In 2000, he completed his second PhD from Prairie View A&M University in finance.

== Career ==
Hossain has served as the chairman of the Investment Corporation of Bangladesh from 15 September 2009. He is a Selection Grade Professor and chairperson of the Department of Finance and Banking at the University of Dhaka.

In 2010 and 2011, there was a severe financial crisis in the Dhaka Stock Exchange in the aftermath of the 2011 Bangladesh share market scam. Following which the government of Bangladesh appointed Hossain on 15 May 2011 to be the chairperson of the Bangladesh Securities and Exchange Commission to restore order to the market. He replaced Ziaul Haque Khondker who had served in the position since 2009.

Hossain term ended on 2014 and was extended for additional four years. He extension required an amendment to the Bangladesh Securities and Exchange Commission (Amendment) Act 2012. His term was extended for another two years after his term ended. The Minister of Finance, Abul Maal Abdul Muhith, raised some questions over the legality of his second extension. The Daily Star described his second extension as unjustified because his term could not be considered successful.

During his term, Hossain faced criticism for approving too many IPOs and declining values of the shares of those companies. In August 2019, the Anti-Corruption Commission started an investigation against Hossain. He faced allegations of embezzlement, money laundering, and approving IPOs after receiving bribes. The executive director of Transparency International Bangladesh called for his resignation.

On 14 May 2020, Hossain ended his term as the chairperson of the Bangladesh Securities and Exchange Commission, the longest serving chairperson of the commission. He was replaced by Professor Shibli Rubayat Ul Islam of the University of Dhaka.
