= Kazi Sanaul Hoq =

Bangladeshi banker

Kazi Sanaul Hoq is a Bangladeshi banker and former Chairman of Rupali Bank Limited. He is a former managing director of Investment Corporation of Bangladesh. His the former managing director of Dhaka Stock Exchange. His appointment as the managing director of Dhaka Stock Exchange was controversial as it had been alleged that the selection process was gamed in his favor through pressure from "upper levels".

== Early life ==
Sanaul Hoq was born on 4 January 1961 in Nilphamari District, East Pakistan, Pakistan. His father, Kazi Ekramul Hoq, was a judicial officer in the East Pakistan Civil Service. He completed his bachelor's degree and masters in accounting from the University of Dhaka.

== Career ==
Sanaul Hoq joined the Investment Corporation of Bangladesh in 1984. He worked as the General Manager of Bangladesh Development Bank Limited.

Sanaul Hoq had served as the managing director of Rajshahi Krishi Unnayan Bank.

On 20 January 2015, Sanaul Hoq was appointed Deputy Managing Director of Agrani Bank. From 2017 to 2019, he was the managing director of the Investment Corporation of Bangladesh. During his time at the helm of Investment Corporation of Bangladesh profits reached a 12-year low.

Sanaul Hoq was working as the managing director of the Investment Corporation of Bangladesh when on 23 August 2019 Hoq was appointed the managing director of Karmasangsthan Bank. Before his appointment he was serving as the managing director of Agrani Bank.

From 9 February 2020 to 7 January 2021, Sanaul Hoq served as the managing director of Dhaka Stock Exchange. Sanaul Hoq was a controversial candidate of the post of the managing director of the Stock Exchange because of the allegation of irregularities against him by the Anti Corruption Commission during the time he was the managing director of Investment Corporation of Bangladesh and his failure to revive the market then. Despite being appointed for a three-year term he resigned after 10 months on "personal grounds".

On 13 June 2021, Sanaul Hoq was appointed the Chairman of Rupali Bank Limited.
