= Sheikh Pasha Habib Uddin =

Bangladeshi military personnel

- Born: 20 November 1967 (age 59); Feni, East Pakistan, Pakistan
- Education: University of Dhaka
- Military career
- Allegiance: Bangladesh
- Branch: Bangladesh Army; Bangladesh Ansar
- Service years: 1987 – 2023
- Rank: Major General
- Service number: BA - 3219
- Unit: Regiment of Artillery
- Commands: Director General of Bangladesh Institute of International and Strategic Studies; Senior Directing Staff (Army-1) of National Defence College; Commandant of Bangladesh Ordnance Factories (BOF); Director General of Bangladesh Ansar and VDP; Commander of 24th Artillery Brigade
- Conflicts: UNOCI
- Awards: Sena Gourab Padak(SGP); Oshamanno Sheba Padak(OSP)

Sheikh Pasha Habib Uddin OSP, SGP, BAMS, afwc, psc is a retired two-star rank Bangladesh Army officer whose last appointment was director general of the Bangladesh Institute of International and Strategic Studies (BIISS). Prior to joining BIISS, he was senior directing staff at the National Defense College. Earlier, he was commandant of Bangladesh Ordnance Factories (BOF) and the director general of Bangladesh Ansar and Village Defence Party. He also served as the chairman of Ansar-VDP Unnayan Bank.

== Early life and education ==
Habib Uddin was born on 20 November 1967 in Feni, Bangladesh. He graduated from Faujdarhat Cadet College and joined the 16th long course of the Bangladesh Military Academy. He was commissioned in the Bangladesh Army on 26 June 1987. He completed his undergraduate degree at the University of Chittagong and an MBA from the IBA, University of Dhaka. He completed a master's in war studies and another in defence studies from the National University of Bangladesh. He attended the National Defence College and the Defence Services Command and Staff College. In 2006, he completed a course on civic response to terrorism at the United States Navy operated Naval Postgraduate School in California. He completed a leadership course at the United States Military Academy.

== Career ==
Habib Uddin served as the defence attache in the Bangladesh embassy in the United Kingdom. He commanded two artillery brigades. He was deputed to the Border Guards Bangladesh, where he served as the commander of the 1st Battalion. He was an instructor in the School of Infantry and Tactics. He commanded a Bangladeshi United Nations peacekeeping contingent. He commanded a mechanized infantry unit in the United Nations Operation in Côte d'Ivoire. He served in the Directorate General of Forces Intelligence. He was made the director general of Bangladesh Ansar and the Village Defence Party on 31 April 2017. On 6 January 2018, he announced that 600,000 personnel of Bangladesh Ansar and the Village Defence Party will be deployed in the next general election of Bangladesh.
