= Md. Badruzzaman =

Bangladeshi judge

Justice of the High Court Division of Bangladesh

Personal details
- Profession: Judge

Md. Badruzzaman is a judge of the High Court Division of the Bangladesh Supreme Court.

== Early life ==
Badruzzaman was born on 6 September 1969. He did his bachelor's and master's in law.

== Career ==
Badruzzaman became the lawyer of district courts on 30 April 1994. He started practicing in the High Court Division on 29 September 1996.

Badruzzaman was appointed an additional judge of the High Court Division on 14 June 2012.

On 12 June 2014, Badruzzaman was made a permanent judge of the High Court Division.

In May 2017, Badruzzaman and Justice Sheikh Hassan Arif declared the annual readmission and semester fees charged by English medium schools in Bangladesh illegal per the Private (English medium) School and College Ordinance, 1962 and the Private English Medium School Registration Rules, 2007. In July, Badruzzaman and Justice Sheikh Hassan Arif ordered the government to reinstate 1447 soldiers of Bangladesh Ansar who were found innocent of being involved in the 1994 Bangladesh Ansar mutiny.

In October 2019, Badruzzaman and Justice Md Habibul Gani issued a four-point directive for lower courts to follow when hearing bail petitions. The verdict was released on 11 September 2020, point one stated the lower courts could not cancel the bail of someone who had been granted bail by the High Court unless there was evidence that the conditions of bail were broken.

On 18 March 2021, Badruzzaman and Justice Jahangir Hossain Selim granted bail to Erfan Selim, son of Awami League Member of Parliament Haji Selim, for assaulting an officer of the Bangladesh Navy. The bail was stayed by the Appellate Division of the Supreme Court of Bangladesh.

Badruzzaman and Justice SM Masud Hossain Dolon wanted to know about steps taken to make handwritten autopsy reports readable at a bail hearing in January 2023. Badruzzaman and Justice SM Masud Hossain Dolon expressed concern over receiving a call from Dhaka District police superintendent of the Police Bureau of Investigation to the deputy attorney general Sujit Kumar Chattarjee. The police officer called requesting an extension of a court deadline for sub-inspector Mizanur Rahman Sojib, the investigation officer of the Rubel murder case. The bench also ordered the suspension of the investigation officer of the case in Manikganj Sub-Inspector Masud Rana.
