= Faruq Ahmad Siddiqi =

- Born: 1947 (age 78–79); Naogaon District, Bangladesh
- Education: University of Dhaka
- Occupation: Civil servant
- Known for: former chairman of the Bangladesh Securities and Exchange Commission

Faruq Ahmad Siddiqi is a retired secretary and former Bangladesh Securities and Exchange Commission chairman. He is a former tax policy member of the National Board of Revenue. As a Secretary to the government of Bangladesh, he was in charge of the ministries of Post and Telecommunications, Education and Commerce. Siddiqi was an independent director of Mutual Trust Bank.

== Early life ==
Siddiqi did his BA (Hons) and Masters in English literature and language, with Economics and History as subsidiary subjects, from the University of Dhaka in 1966 and 1967 respectively. He joined former Pakistan Taxation Service in 1969. He was trained at Finance Academy, Lahore for one year followed by training at Taxation training Centre, Karachi for another year. Faruq Ahmad Siddiqi is the son of H.M.R. Siddiqui, a retired district judge and former Registrar of the Bangladesh Supreme Court. H.M.R. Siddiqui was also the first Chairman of the Press Council of Bangladesh. One of Siddiqi's younger sister is Justice Zinat Ara, former justice of the Appellate Division, who was later appointed as the chairperson of the Law Commission. Also, M. Touhid Hossain, Advisor for Foreign Affairs (2024–2026) and former Foreign Secretary to the Bangladesh Government is his brother-in-law (husband of Siddiqi's younger sister, Jahan Ara Siddiqui, former Member of the National Board of Revenue). One of his first cousins is Ziaul Hasan Siddiqui, former Deputy Governor of Bangladesh Bank, and ex-chairman of Sonali Bank.

== Career ==
From 2001 to 2006, Siddiqi served as secretary of the Ministry of Posts, Telecommunications and Information Technology, Ministry of Education, and Ministry of Commerce. In 2006, he was appointed as the chairman of Bangladesh Securities and Exchange Commission (BSEC) by the BNP government. During his time, he had warned against overevaluation of shares before entering market. He completed his tenure in March 2009 and was replaced by acting chairman Mansur Alam.

Siddiqi was an independent director of Summit Power International Limited. He is a member of the Rating Committee of the Credit Rating Agency of Bangladesh Limited. He had served as an independent director of Al- Arafah Islamic Bank Limited. He is a former director of Apex Tannery Limited and Runner Motors Limited.

In January 2021, Siddiqi joined Mutual Trust Bank as an independent director. In September 2021 and his term ended in 2024, Siddiqi stated that the Bangladesh Securities and Exchange Commission needs to work closely with Bangladesh Bank but there was no need for alarm over the stock markets. He was critical of the low quality companies offering IPOs.

In 2024, Siddiqi blamed the declining index of Dhaka Stock Exchange on panic created by poor performance of various economic indicators of Bangladesh. He was born in 1947 in the district of Naogaon,
