= Siddiqur Rahman Miah =

Bangladeshi judge

Justice of the High Court Division of Bangladesh

Personal details
- Profession: Judge

Siddiqur Rahman Miah is a retired justice of the High Court Division of the Bangladesh Supreme Court and former president of Dhaka Stock Exchange. He is the chairman of the AB Bank's Shariah Supervisory Committee. He is a director of Dhaka Stock Exchange.

== Career ==
In May 2003, Miah and Justice Abdur Rashid asked the government to explain why it should not declare illegal the appointing ministers and members of parliament in charge of districts of Bangladesh.

Miah and Justice Farah Mahbub rejected the bail petition of Bangladesh Jamaat-e Islami Rajshahi unit chief Ameer Ataur Rahman in a case filed over the murder of a student of the University of Rajshahi.

In March 2011, Miah and Justice Md Ataur Rahman Khan quashed a corruption case against Nazmul Huda, Bangladesh Nationalist Party politician, and his wife Sigma Huda. In November, Miah and Justice AKM Shahidul Huq granted bail to Bangladesh Nationalist Party politician ANM Ehsanul Hoque Milan.

Miah and Justice A. K. M. Shahidul Huq were one of many High Court Division judges who refused to hear the bail petition of Bangladesh Nationalist Party politicians on 3 May 2012.

In February 2014, Miah was elected chairman of Dhaka Stock Exchange. He replaced Ahasanul Islam Titu as chairman of Dhaka Stock Exchange. Miah served as the chairman till 13 February 2017 and was replaced by Professor Abul Hashem.

In 2018, Miah was a director of the Dhaka Stock Exchange. In February 2019, Miah was given the task to investigate losses of Shwapno, a subsidiary of ACI Limited which is listed on the Dhaka Stock Exchange following a complaint by an investor.

Miah was appointed chairman of AB Bank Shariah Supervisory Committee in January 2021. He is a member of the Central Shariah Board for Islamic Banks of Bangladesh. He is the chairman of Saarc Human Rights Foundation. He is an associate professor of Fareast International University. He spoke out against the formation of a neutral caretaker government before the 2024 general election in Bangladesh.
