= Shahabuddin Ahmed ministry =

11th Council of Ministers of Bangladesh

- 11th Council of Ministers and 4th Council of Advisers of the People’s Republic of Bangladesh
- 9 December 1990–20 March 1991
- Date formed: 9 December 1990
- Date dissolved: 20 March 1991

People and organisations
- President: Shahabuddin Ahmed (acting)
- President's history: Chief Justice of Bangladesh (since Jan, 1990)
- Total no. of members: 18
- Member party: Independent
- Status in legislature: Dissolved

History
- Election: -
- Outgoing election: 1991 (general)
- Predecessor: Ershad
- Successor: Khaleda I

An interim government led by the Shahabuddin Ahmed ministry was formed on 9 December 1990 in Bangladesh, following President HM Ershad's resignation on 6 December in the face of a mass uprising against his regime. Shahabuddin had taken office as the acting president of the country after he was unanimously agreed upon by the leaders of all political parties to be ceremoniously appointed by Ershad just before resigning as vice-president in place of Moudud Ahmed. He administered the oath of office to his council of advisers at Bangabhaban on 9 December 1990. During this period, he gave back freedom of the press by amending a number of law including the Special Powers Act.

Following the dissolution of the 4th term of the Jatiya Sangsad on 6 December 1990, the cabinet remained in office until 20 March 1991, when Khaleda Zia of the Bangladesh Nationalist Party, which emerged as the largest party in the general election held in February, was appointed as the new Prime Minister.

== Background ==
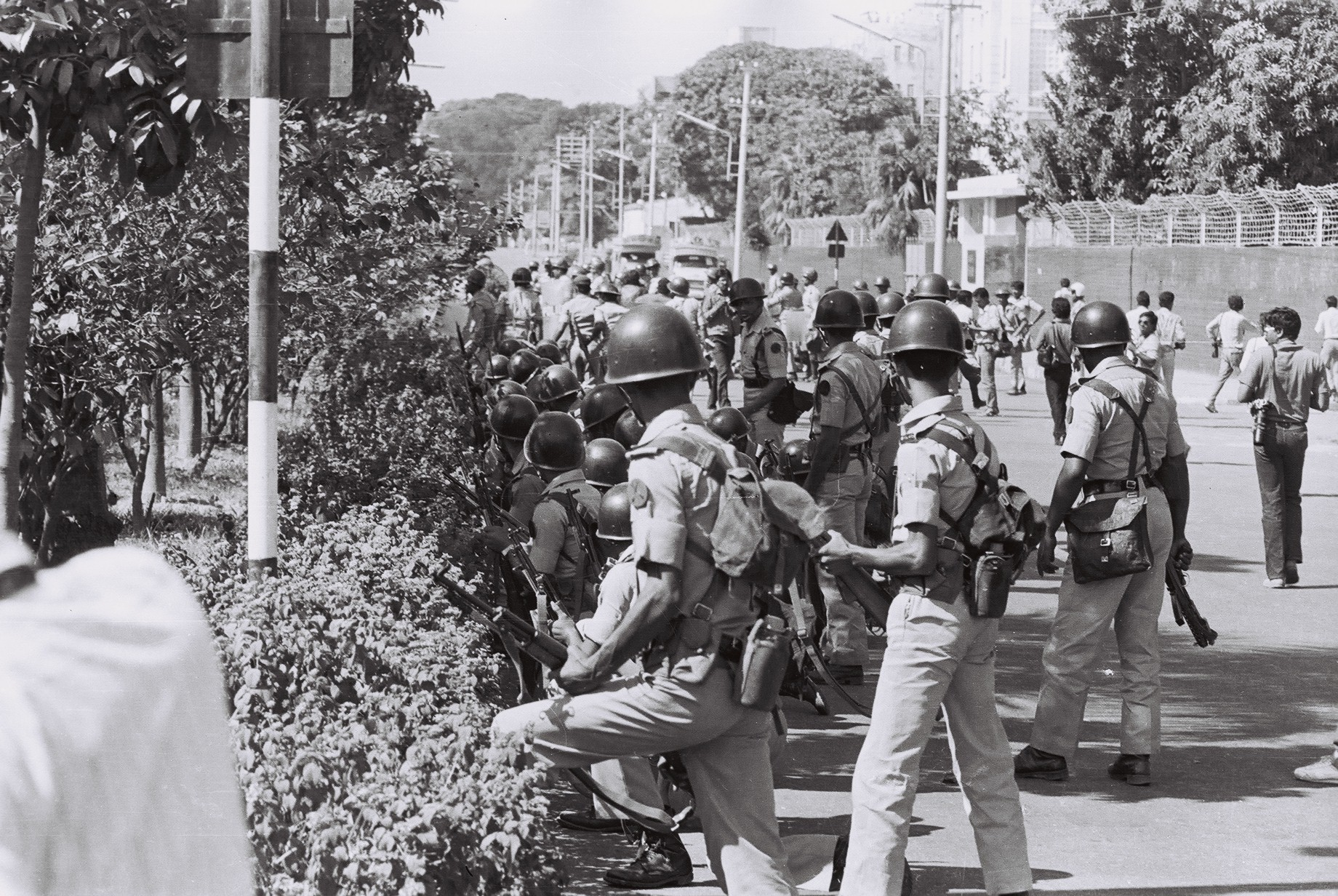
Bangladesh Rifles troops stationed in Dhaka, photographed by Dinu Alam on 10 November 1987

A mass uprising took place in Bangladesh on 4 December 1990 and led to the fall of General Hussain Muhammad Ershad. The uprising, popularly known in Bangladesh as the "ʼ90's Anti-Authoritarian Movement", (Note: Bengali: নব্বইয়ের স্বৈরাচারবিরোধী আন্দোলন) was the result of a series of popular protests that started on 10 October 1990 to topple General Ershad, who came to power in 1982 by imposing martial law and replaced a democratically elected president, Abdus Sattar, through a bloodless coup.

The uprising is marked as the starting point of parliamentary democracy in Bangladesh after nine years of military rule and paved the way for a credible election in 1991. The Bangladesh Nationalist Party-led 7-party alliance, the Bangladesh Awami League-led 8-party alliance, and the leftist 5-party alliance were instrumental in staging the uprising against Ershad.

About one hundred people died during the protests. Around fifty were casualties of violence and street fights that started from 27 November, after a state of emergency was declared. General Ershad was arrested immediately after the uprising on corruption charges.

== List of advisers ==
The following lists the advisers of the interim government:

Portfolio	Minister	Took office	Left office
Adviser for꞉: Law and Justice; Religious Affairs	M A Khaleq	9 December 1990	15 March 1991
Adviser for Finance	Kafiluddin Mahmood	9 December 1990	15 March 1991
Adviser for Foreign Affairs	Fakhruddin Ahmed	9 December 1990	15 March 1991
Adviser for Planning; In-charge of Economic Relations Division	Rehman Sobhan	9 December 1990	15 March 1991
Adviser for꞉: Power, Energy and Mineral Resources; Housing and Public Works	Wahiduddin Mahmud	15 December 1990	15 March 1991
Adviser for Education	Zillur Rahman Siddiqui	9 December 1990	15 March 1991
Adviser for: Social Welfare; Women Affairs; Youth and Sports	Alamgir M. A. Kabir	15 December 1990	15 March 1991
Adviser for꞉: Industries; Textiles; Jute	AKM Musa	16 December 1990	15 March 1991
Adviser for Health and Family Welfare	M. A. Majed	9 December 1990	15 March 1991
Adviser for꞉: Civil Aviation and Tourism; Shipping	Rafiqul Islam	9 December 1990	15 March 1991
Adviser for꞉: Cultural Affairs; Food	Iajuddin Ahmed	17 December 1990	15 March 1991
Adviser for Communications	A. B. M. G. Kibria	9 December 1990	15 March 1991
Adviser for꞉: Irrigation, Water Development and Flood Control; Fisheries and Livestock; Environment and Forest	Qazi Fazlur Rahman	17 December 1990	15 March 1991
Adviser for Commerce	Imam Uddin Ahmed Chowdhury	7 January 1991	15 March 1991
Adviser for Relief	BK Das	9 January 1990	15 March 1991
Adviser for꞉: Agriculture; Land	A. M. Anisuzzaman	9 January 1990	15 March 1991
Adviser for Labour and Manpower; In-charge of Internal Resources Division	Chowdhury A K M Aminul Haque	9 January 1990	15 March 1991

== See also ==
- Sayem ministry (interim 1975-78)
- Yunus ministry (interim 2024-26)
- 1990 mass uprising in Bangladesh
- Elections in Bangladesh
- List of cabinets of Bangladesh
- Caretaker government of Bangladesh
- Government of Bangladesh
- Politics of Bangladesh
