= Hasina Mumtaz =

Bangladeshi singer (1945–2024)

- হাসিনা মমতাজ
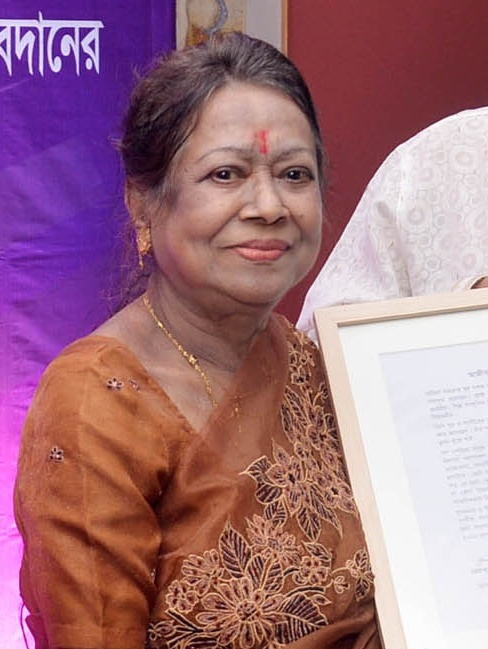
- Momtaz receiving award in 2022
- Born: Hasina Hossain Mumtaz; 10 March 1945
- Died: 18 February 2024 (aged 78); Dhaka, Bangladesh
- Education: University of Dhaka
- Occupation: Musician
- Spouse: Rafiqul Islam Khan
- Children: Shibli Rubayat Ul Islam
- Awards: Shilpakala Padak (2019)

Hasina Hossain Mumtaz (10 March 1945 – 18 February 2024) was a Bangladeshi singer. She received Shilpakala Padak awarded by Bangladesh Shilpakala Academy in 2019 for her contribution to vocal music.

== Biography ==
Hasina Mumtaz was born on 10 March 1945. Hasina's mother Bibi Zulfa Khatun Chaudhurani. She was a student of Geography Department of University of Dhaka and was involved in various cultural activities.

Mumtaz's husband, Rafiqul Islam Khan, was the managing director of National Bank.

The couple's only son, Shibli Rubaiyat-ul-Islam, is the former Dean of the Faculty of Business Administration of University of Dhaka and the Chairman of the Bangladesh Securities and Exchange Commission (BSEC).

Mumtaz gained popularity as a singer from the 1960s.

Mumtaz gave inspiration through music during the 1969 mass uprising and liberation war.

== Death ==
Mumtaz died in Dhaka, Bangladesh on 18 February 2024, at the age of 78.
