= Nasiruddin Ahmed =

Bangladeshi civil servant

Nasiruddin Ahmed is a retired Bangladeshi civil servant and former chairman of the National Board of Revenue. He is also a former commissioner of the Anti-Corruption Commission, and of the Bangladesh Rural Electrification Board.

== Early life ==
Ahmed completed his PhD in economics at the University of Sydney.

== Career ==
From 8 February 2009 to 8 March 2009, Ahmed was the chairman of the Bangladesh Rural Electrification Board. He was previously member directing staff at the Bangladesh Public Administration Training Centre. He was transferred to the Ministry of Housing and Public Works in March. Bhuiyan Safiqul Islam replaced him as the chairman of the Bangladesh Rural Electrification Board.

In April 2009, Ahmed was the acting Secretary of the Ministry of Housing and Public Works. He was appointed Chairman of the National Board of Revenue replacing Muhammad Abdul Mazid who was appointed an officer on special duty at the Ministry of Public Administration. He was promoted to Secretary in August.

Ghulam Hussain replaced Ahmed as chairman of the National Board of Revenue on 29 October 2012. Ahmed joined the Institute for Governance Studies on 3 January 2013.

In June 2013, the government appointed M Badiuzzaman chairman of Anti-Corruption Commission replacing Ghulam Rahman and Nasiruddin Ahmed was appointed commissioner. Ahmed had the rank and status of a High Court Division judge. He oversaw increased automation at the commission to reduce corruption.
