= Muladi massacre =

Massacre in Muladi, Barisal

Muladi massacre; মুলাদি গণহত্যা
- Location: Muladi, Barisal, East Bengal, Dominion of Pakistan
- Date: 17–20 February 1950 (UTC+6:00)
- Target: Bengali Hindus, Bengali Christians
- Attack type: Mass murder, Massacre
- Weapons: Swords, Machetes
- Deaths: 1,000+
- Perpetrator: Muslim mobs

Muladi massacres (Bengali: মুলাদি গণহত্যা) were a series of massacres of unarmed Hindus and Christians in the river port of Muladi in East Pakistan between 17 and 20 February 1950 by armed radical Muslim mobs with the active complicity of the Ansars and police.

== Events ==
As the news of killings in Dhaka reached Barisal district, tension began to mount. On 14 February, a peace meeting was held at the Jinnah Club where the Muslim leaders assured Hindus and Christians of protection. In spite of the assurances, Kazirchar and Khaserhat were attacked on 15 February. On the night of 16th, the village of Satani was attacked and set on fire. Madan Nandi, a well-to-do Hindu and his brother were killed. Two eminent upper-caste doctors, Dr. Prafulla C. Gain and Dr. Kallol B. Banerjee were victims too. When the villagers went to lodge a complaint at the Muladi police station the Officer in Charge told the villagers to cremate the dead and tell their family that they had died of disease. The insensitive and nonchalant attitude of the O.C. concerned the villagers.

=== 17 February ===
From the night of 16th, cries of 'Allah ho Akbar' and 'Kill the infidels' could be heard from a distance. On the morning of 17th, terrified Hindus and Christians began to rush towards the Muladi police station. The O.C. however refused to provide any shelter to the terrified people. At around 3 P.M., a 3,000 to 4,000 strong mob attacked and looted the warehouses in the Muladi port. The Hindus and Christians ran helter-skelter and the armed mob pounced upon them. They killed the men indiscriminately and violated the women in broad daylight in public. The orgy of loot, murder, rape and arson continued until the evening, when they departed with the loot and the abducted women. Christian churches were vandalized and looted. The streets, ghats and the river were full of corpses. In the betelnut orchard of one Hindu, more 300 dead bodies were found.

=== 18 February ===
On the morning of 18th, Saturday, many Hindus and Christians returned to their looted, destroyed and gutted houses. In the evening, they once again assembled at the police station. This time they were allowed inside in lieu of their cash and jewellery. In the meantime, the Ansars went all around Muladi announcing in loudspeakers asking the Hindus to assemble at the Muladi police station. After the Hindus and Christians had gathered hundreds of non-Muslim men were massacred within the precincts of the police station. The O.C. himself stripped the Hindu women of their vermillion and conch shell bangles and forced them to recite the kalma. Later, he distributed the women among the gang leaders for rape.

=== 20 February ===
The survivors of Muladi and adjoining villages had spent the last couple of nights in jungles and burned-out houses. On the morning of 20 February, the Officer-in-Charge announced that a relief camp has been opened in the port area. He seized all the money and the jewellery from the Hindus gathered at the police station and directed them towards the port. At the port, the Hindus were divided into three groups at put up at three warehouses - the Panch Tahabil and the ones belonging to Madhablal Kundu and Sukhamay Kundu.

At around 12 noon, at the signal of the O.C, a 3,000 strong armed Muslim mob attacked the warehouses. More than 700 men and elderly women were massacred and their bodies thrown into the river. The remaining women were taken into a shed belonging to one Mukteshwar Saha and forced to recite the kalma. After that 50 women were distributed among the gang leaders and raped. In the afternoon, Sirajul Haque, the Regional Controller of Procurement, arrived from Barisal in a launch accompanied by armed police. The goondas fled. The surviving men and unabducted women were taken to Barisal.
