= Ansar-VDP Unnayan Bank =

Specialized Government-Owned Bank In Bangladesh

- Company type: State owned
- Industry: Banking
- Founded: Dhaka, Bangladesh
- Headquarters: Dhaka, Bangladesh
- Key people: Major General AKM Aminul Haque (Chairman); Mosaddeq-ul-Alam (Managing Director & CEO)
- Products: Banking services Consumer Banking; Corporate Banking; Investment Banking
- Net income: ▲
- Website: ansarvdpbank.gov.bd

Ansar-VDP Unnayan Bank is a specialized government owned bank in Bangladesh. The bank was founded to provide financial services to the paramilitary Bangladesh Ansar and Village Defence Party. Major General AKM Nazmul Hasan is the chairman of this bank. The bank has 259 branches across the country under 18 regions. It is one of four specialized banks owned by the government of Bangladesh; the rest are Bangladesh Krishi Bank, Karmasangsthan Bank, and Rajshahi Krishi Unnayan Bank.

== History ==
The bank was established in 1995 through an act of parliament. Despite being a bank dedicated for Bangladesh Ansar and Village Defence Party members, it has failed to attract adequate interest from them. It was founded after the 1994 Bangladesh Ansar mutiny as part of reforms after the mutiny. The bank started operations in 1996 with 25 per cent stake owned by the government of Bangladesh and 75 per cent by the members of Bangladesh Ansar and Village Defence Party.

In 2015, the Ansar-VDP Unnayan Bank asked the government to increase its stake in the bank from 25 per cent to 75 per cent as members of the Ansar and Village Defence Party were not interested in purchasing the shares available to them.

In 2019, Md Mosaddake-Ul-Alam was appointed the managing director of Ansar-VDP Unnayan Bank.

Ansar-VDP Unnayan Bank paid 435.1 million in taxes in 2021.

Md Mosaddake-Ul-Alam was re-elected managing director of Ansar-VDP Unnayan Bank in June 2022. Major General AKM Nazmul Hasan was appointed the bank chairman on 24 August 2022. Bangladesh High Court appointed the former managing director of Ansar-VDP Unnayan Bank, Mohammad Jalal Uddin, to the board of directors of People's Leasing and Financial Services Limited.
