= Mashiur Rahman =

Poet Mashiur Rahman Rahman may refer to:

- Mashiur Rahman (politician, born 1920) (1920–1971), Bangladeshi lawyer and politician.
- Mashiur Rahman (politician, born 1924) (1924–1979), Bangladeshi politician and acting prime minister of Bangladesh.
- Mashiur Rahman (adviser), Bangladesh Awami League politician.
- Mashiur Rahaman Ranga, Bangladeshi politician from Rangpur.
- Mashiur Rahman Samrat, Bangladeshi serial killer.
- Md. Mashiur Rahman, Bangladeshi academic
