= Karmasangsthan Bank =

Bank in Bangladesh

- Type: State-owned enterprise
- Industry: Financial services
- Founded: 1998; 28 years ago
- Headquarters: Dhaka, Bangladesh
- Key people: MD. Nurul Amin (Chairman), Shirin Akhter (Managing Director)
- Products: Banking services, Consumer Banking, Corporate Banking, Investment Banking
- Services: Interest free loans for unemployed people
- Website: www.kb.gov.bd

Karmasangsthan Bank (lit. 'Employment Bank') (Bengali: কর্মসংস্থান ব্যাংক) is a Bangladeshi specialised government owned bank. The bank was founded to finance the unemployed to set up small enterprises.

Two similar specialised institutions that operate in Bangladesh are Ansar-VDP Unnayan Bank and the Probashi Kallyan Bank. MD. Nurul Amin is the present chairperson of Karmasangsthan Bank.

== History ==
The bank was founded in 1998 by the Awami League government, with an approved capital of 3 billion taka. The Karmasangsthan Bank was established as per Karmasangsthan Bank Act No.7 of 1998. The bank was founded to increase income of people in rural areas of Bangladesh. According to Sahara Khatun the bank was neglected after the Bangladesh Nationalist Party came to power.

Dewan Mujibur Rahman was appointed managing director of Karmasangsthan Bank in September 2004. In August 2007, Karmasangsthan Bank donated 416 thousand taka to the Chief Adviser's Relief and Welfare Fund.

The highest interest rate charged by the bank in 2010 was 10 per cent.

Maniruzzaman Khandker, tax advisor to Prime Minister Sheikh Hasina and director of Midland Bank Limited, was the managing director of the bank in 2012.

In January 2014, Bangladesh Bank ordered Karmasangsthan Bank to not open new branches and set a series of conditions the bank must meet.

Kaniz Fatema was appointed chairman of the bank in April. Kazi Sanaul Hoq was appointed managing director of Karmasangsthan Bank in August 2019. It provides funding to workers training institutes.

Md Tajul Islam was appointed managing director of Karmasangsthan Bank in January 2020. The government of Bangladesh announced a loan of 20 billion taka to be distributed to Karmasangsthan Bank, Palli Sanchay Bank, Palli Karma Sahayak Foundation, and Probashi Kallyan Bank.

Prime Minister Sheikh Hasina said the bank was providing interest free loans to unemployed youth to start businesses in May 2021. It received part of a 15 billion taka grant from the government of Bangladesh.

Shirin Akhtar was appointed managing director of the bank in January 2022. Md Nurul Amin was appointed chairman of Karmasangsthan Bank in May 2022.

Mr. Md. Sayedul Islam, Former Secretary of the People's Republic of Bangladesh appointed as the Chairman of Karmasangsthan Bank and joined on 18 May 2023.

== Board of directors ==
Name	Position	Reference
AFM Matiur Rahman	Chairman	
Talukder Salahuddin Ahmad	Director	
Md. Daud Mia	Director	
Gazi Md. Saifuzzaman	Director	
Md. Mustafa Kamal Majumder	Director	
Md. Hanif Mia	Director	
Arun Kumar Chowdhury	Managing Director	
Md. Iqbal Hossain	Secretary	
