= 2024 Bangladesh Ansar protest =

Protest for reforms by a paramilitary force in Bangladesh

- Part of the Aftermath of the July Uprising
- Date: 25 August 2024
- Location: Bangladesh Secretariat, Dhaka, Bangladesh; 23.7288°N 90.4086°E
- Goals: Nationalisation of Ansar; Abolition of the six-month rest system
- Methods: Protest; Traffic obstruction; Picketing; Sitdown strike; Occupation; Civil disobedience
- Result: Protesters' surrender: Protesting Ansars clashed with students and Army, resulting heavy casualties; Government accepts all demands of the protesters; Indefinite prohibition of demonstrations in front of the secretariat and the residence of the Chief Adviser

Parties
Faction members of Bangladesh Ansar	Government of Bangladesh: Bangladesh Army; Border Guard Bangladesh; Students Against Discrimination: Students of Dhaka University

Casualties
- Death: 1 civilian
- Injuries: 40 protesters and students (including Hasnat Abdullah); 6 army personnel (ISPR); 1 journalist
- Arrested: 388 protesters

The 2024 Bangladesh Ansar protest was a protest for reforms on 25 August 2024, near the Bangladesh Secretariat by some members of the Bangladesh Ansar, a paramilitary force tasked with providing security to government installations and aiding law enforcement in Bangladesh.

== Background ==
Following the Resignation of Sheikh Hasina, a faction of Ansar members began protesting, demanding the nationalisation of their jobs and the abolition of the six-month "Rest System", among other benefits. These demonstrations led to severe traffic congestion across Dhaka, causing significant public disruption.

On 25 August, the Home Affairs Advisor, Jahangir Alam Chowdhury, met with the protesting Ansar members. He announced a preliminary decision to abolish the six-month Rest System and assured that the demand for nationalisation would be reviewed by a forthcoming committee. Although the Ansar members continued to protest reportedly, due to the lack of guarantees regarding job nationalisation.

== Event ==
Later that day, Ansar protesters reportedly trapped two coordinators of the Students Against Discrimination, Hasnat Abdullah and Sarjis Alam, along with other officials, including Information and Communications Technology advisor Nahid Islam, inside the Secretariat.

Earlier that day, Hasnat Abdullah had accused the Ansar members of holding them captive and called for support on social media. The situation worsened when Ansar members forced their way into the Secretariat, chanting slogans and demanding that their demands be met.

Around 9.00 PM (UTC+6), a group of students marched from Dhaka University TSC to the Secretariat and were met with bricks and stones thrown by Ansar members, leading to 40 injuries, including Hasnat Abdullah.

The students used sticks and threw rocks in response. The students, with support given by the Bangladesh Army, eventually overpowered the Ansar members, leading to their surrender. The officials trapped inside were released after 10 hours.

== Aftermath ==
A man who was injured while attempting to retrieve his son, a student protester, succumbed to his injuries on 4 September at Dhaka Medical College Hospital.

Over 100 Ansar members whom were at the secretariat during clashes were taken to Shahbagh Police Station and a total of 388 Ansar members were arrested and sent to jail on charges of unlawful assembly. Subsequently, nine deputy directors and ten directors of Ansar were transferred from their posts.

Additionally, the Dhaka Metropolitan Police banned rallies, meetings and demonstrations adjoining the Bangladesh secretariat and residence of the Chief Adviser.

== See also ==
- 1994 Bangladesh Ansar mutiny
