= Mohammad Moinuddin Abdullah =

Bangladeshi civil servant and chairman of the Anti-Corruption Commission

6th Chairman of the Anti-Corruption Commission
- In office 10 March 2021 – 29 October 2024
- Appointed by: President of Bangladesh
- President: Mohammad Abdul Hamid; Mohammed Shahabuddin
- Preceded by: Iqbal Mahmood
- Succeeded by: Mohammad Abdul Momen

Personal details
- Born: 18 August 1959 (age 67) Comilla District, East Pakistan (present day Bangladesh)
- Education: University of Dhaka
- Profession: Former Senior Secretary
- Website: www.acc.org.bd

Mohammad Moinuddin Abdullah is a Bangladeshi civil servant and former chairman of the Anti-Corruption Commission. During his term Anti-Corruption Commission officials raised complaints against the top management of the commission coming from Bangladesh Civil Service and operating under different rules from regular staff of the commission.

== Early life ==
Abdullah was born in 1959 in Comilla District, East Pakistan, Pakistan. He completed his undergraduate and masters in soil sciences from the University of Dhaka.

== Career ==
Abdullah joined the Bangladesh Civil Service in 1983 as an administration cadre. He first posting was as magistrate.

Abdullah had served as the assistant private secretary to the Chief Adviser of the caretaker government of Bangladesh, Fakhruddin Ahmed.

In May 2009, Abdullah was appointed director general of the Prime Minister's Office under Prime Minister Sheikh Hasina and served there till May 2010. Abdullah served as the divisional commissioner of Dhaka Division from 2010 to 2012. He was then appointed the Secretary at the Ministry of Industries.

From 2014 to 2016, Abdullah was the secretary at the Ministry of Housing and Public Works.

From 2016 to 2018, Abdullah served as the senior secretary of the Ministry of Agriculture.

In July 2019, Abdullah was made the chairperson of Palli Karma Sahayak Foundation. He served in the Syndicate Board of Dhaka University of Engineering and Technology, Jahangirnagar University, and Jatiya Kabi Kazi Nazrul Islam University. He is a former general secretary of the Bangladesh Administrative Service Association.

Abdullah was appointed one of the commissioners and subsequently made the chairman of the Bangladesh Anti Commission on 3 March 2021 with the rank and status of a judge of the Appellate Division of the Supreme Court. He replaced Iqbal Mahmood as chairman.
