= M Masrur Reaz =

Bangladeshi Economist

Chairman of the Bangladesh Securities and Exchange Commission
- Incumbent
- Assumed office 13 August 2024
- Preceded by: Shibli Rubayat Ul Islam

M Masrur Reaz is a Bangladeshi economist. He is the chairman and CEO of Policy Exchange, a private think tank based in Bangladesh. On 13 August 2024, the interim government appointed Reaz as chairman of the Bangladesh Securities and Exchange Commission (BSEC). However, he subsequently declined to assume the position.
