= Shibli Rubayat Ul Islam =

Chairman of the Bangladesh Securities and Exchange Commission (born 1968)

- শিবলী রুবাইয়াত-উল-ইসলাম
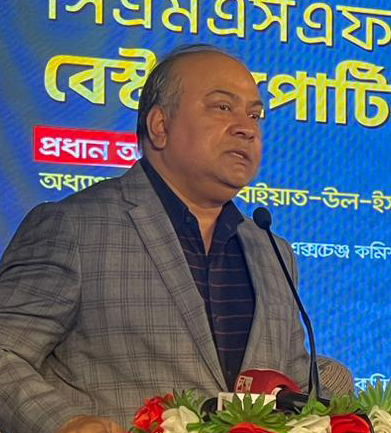
- Islam at Dhaka Club (2023)

Chairman of the Bangladesh Securities and Exchange Commission
- In office 17 May 2020 – 10 August 2024
- Appointed by: Sheikh Hasina
- Preceded by: M Khairul Hossain
- Succeeded by: M Masrur Reaz

Personal details
- Born: 1 January 1968 (age 58) Dhaka, East Pakistan, Pakistan
- Parents: Rafiqul Islam Khan (father); Hasina Mumtaz (mother)
- Website: shiblirubayatulislam.com

Shibli Rubayat Ul Islam (born 1 January 1968) is a former controversial chairman of the Bangladesh Securities and Exchange Commission. He is the former chairman and dean of the Faculty of Business Studies at the University of Dhaka. He is treasurer of Dhaka University Central Students' Union.

Islam was vice-chair of the Asia Pacific Regional Committee (APRC) of the International Organization of Securities Commissions (IOSCO).

== Early life ==
Islam was born on 1 January 1968 in Dhamrai, Dhaka, East Pakistan in the then Pakistan. His father, Rafiqul Islam Khan, was the managing director of National Bank Limited. His mother, Hasina Mumtaz, is a singer. His uncle was Jamilur Reza Choudhury, National Professor of Bangladesh.

Islam passed SSC in 1983 from Dhaka Government Laboratory High School and HSC in 1985 from Dhaka College. Later he graduated from the University of Dhaka in 1985–1989 with an MBA degree from the Faculty of Business Studies.

== Career ==
=== Academia ===
Islam was a professor of the Faculty of Business Studies at the University of Dhaka.

Islam was elected as the treasurer of the Dhaka University Teachers' Association in December 2014. He was elected from the blue panel, which is supported by the Awami League.

Islam was a syndicate member of East West University, and Southeast University.

Islam's book ই-ব্যাংকিং অ্যান্ড ই-কমার্স (E-Banking and E-Commerce) was published in 2016.

On 22 May 2017, Islam was elected member of the senate of the University of Dhaka. He gave a speech at the Beijing Normal University. In December 2017, Islam was elected general secretary of the Dhaka University Teachers' Association the Blue panel, which is backed by the Awami League. He sought votes for the Awami League before the 2018 Bangladeshi general election. He was guest professor at Sichuan University, Chengdu, China

In September 2019, some students of the University of Dhaka, including Nurul Haq Nur, demanded the resignation of Islam from the post of dean of the business studies faculty alleging he had enrolled 34 Bangladesh Chhatra League activists illegally in evening courses without admission tests. He defended their admission without tests as within the rules of the University of Dhaka which was denied by fellow faculties at the university. He was then treasurer of the Dhaka University Central Students' Union, appointed in March. He described the allegations against him as "torture". He is an Ambassador of Valor of Bangladesh.

Islam tenure as a member of the senate of the University of Dhaka was extended in 2020 breaking rules of the Dhaka University Ordinance,1973.

In December 2020, Islam was included in the education and human resource sub-committee of the Awami League. He is an advisor of Blockchain Olympiad Bangladesh. He is an advisor of Business Case for Better Bangladesh. He is a patron of Bangabandhu International Research Centre UK. He is a syndicate member of BGMEA University of Fashion & Technology. He was one of three authors of The Economic Development of Bangladesh in the Asian Century book published in 2020.

=== Banking and business ===
Islam served for more than three years as the chairman of Sadharan Bima Corporation since 2016. He was a director of Community Bank Bangladesh Limited. He was the secretary general of the Switzerland Bangladesh Chamber of Commerce and Industry.

Islam in the ownership and management of Rhine Fashions Private Limited and Rhine Garments Private Limited.

=== Bangladesh Securities and Exchange Commission ===
Islam was appointed chairman of Bangladesh Securities and Exchange Commission in May 2020 for a four-year term. He replaced Professor M Khairul Hossain who had served as the chairman of Bangladesh Securities and Exchange Commission for nine years. In March, he introduced floor prices during the COVID-19 pandemic in Bangladesh for the first time. He announced plans to crackdown on junk stocks. He approved the initial public offering of Robi, the largest IPO in Bangladesh.

According to the Organized Crime and Corruption Reporting Project, Islam received payments from Javeed Matin through XIN Bangla Fabrics, who had defrauded a Hong Kong company, Ming Global Limited, out of US$13 million. Matin and Islam where friends from university. Matin had used a US based company called Monarch Holdings Inc for the fraud in July 2020. Islam claimed the funds were given to him as rent and denied any wrongdoings. Matin's partner in Bangladesh was Shakib Al Hasan, a national cricketer. In May 2021, Islam approved a trading license for Monarch.

Islam approved plans by Nagad to raise 5.1 billion BDT through bonds. He approved the first Green Sukuk in Bangladesh. He organized a roadshow in the United States to promote investment in Bangladesh.

Islam increased the speed of the approval process for initial public offering. Islam requested Prime Minister Sheikh Hasina to waive the Civil Aviation Authority of Bangladesh surcharge fees on United Airways, which was defunct, to revive the airline in November 2022. Prime Minister Sheikh Hasina accepted his request and ordered the relevant ministry to take steps in this regard. He approved a subsidiary of Bashundhara Group purchasing 25 percent stake in the Chittagong Stock Exchange. Although there were calls to increase the floor prices on the stock exchange, he chose not to do so. He announced plans to restructure boards of some non-bank financial institutions. He was appointed vice chair for Asia Pacific Regional Committee of the International Organization of Securities Commissions.

Islam claimed that Bangladesh Securities and Exchange Commission was unable to monitor all listed companies due to a lack of personnel. He launched an alternate trading board for companies not listed on the stock exchanges. He announced plans to digitalize the services of Bangladesh Securities and Exchange Commission. He said he would life the floor prices on the stock exchange when the position of the market improves.

== Scandals ==
During his tenure at BSEC, Islam has been accused of receiving payments from bank accounts associated with a $13 million fraud, according to a report by the Organized Crime and Corruption Reporting Project.

== Personal life ==
Islam is married to Shenin Rubayat, a faculty member of the Department of English and Humanities at BRAC University and anchorwoman at Bangladesh Television.
