= A. M. Anisuzzaman =

A. M. Anisuzzaman was a government secretary and member of the Shahabuddin Ahmed ministry in charge of the Ministry of Land and the Ministry of Agriculture. He was a special advisor for agriculture to Prime Minister Sheikh Hasina. He was a former secretary of the Ministry of Agriculture.

Anisuzzaman supported Muhammad Yunus in launching Grameen Bank by allowing the first branch of Grameen Bank to be opened at a branch of Bangladesh Krishi Bank in Chittagong.

== Career ==
Anisuzzaman joined the Central Superior Services in 1956. He choose to focus on the agriculture sector after joining the civil service. From 1966 to 1967, he was the deputy commissioner of Mymensingh District. He was then made deputy secretary of the Ministry of Finance.

From 1969 to 1970, Anisuzzaman was the secretary of the Relief and Rehabilitation Department. After the Independence of Bangladesh, he escaped Pakistan through Afghanistan and was appointed secretary of Ministry of Agriculture. He was the chairman of Bangladesh Agricultural Development Corporation. He was the managing director of Bangladesh Krishi Bank. He supported Muhammad Yunus in launching Grameen Bank by allowing the first branch of Grameen Bank to be opened at a branch of Bangladesh Krishi Bank in Chittagong.

In 1990, Anisuzzaman retired from government service. He served as an advisor in the Shahabuddin Ahmed ministry in charge of the Ministry of Land and the Ministry of Agriculture.

Anisuzzaman was the special advisor for agriculture to Prime Minister Sheikh Hasina from 1996 to 2001.

== Personal life ==
Anisuzzaman was married to Sofia Mazumdar.

== Death ==
Anisuzzaman died on 29th November 2023 in Gulshan, Dhaka. He was buried in Banani Graveyard beside his wife.
