= Bangladesh Ansar and VDP Academy =

Ansar-VDP Academy
- Shafipur, Gazipur District; Bangladesh

Information
- Type: Ansar & VDP Training
- Established: 1975
- Website: ansarvdp.gov.bd

Ansar-VDP Academy is a training institute. It is responsible for the training of Bangladesh Ansar and Village Defence Party in Bangladesh. It is located at Shafipur, Gazipur District.

== History ==
The academy started out as the National Ansar Training Centre in 1975. In 1983 it was changed to Ansar Training School. It was changed to Ansar Academy in 1986 and again to Ansar-VDP Academy in 1995.
