= BK Das =

Bangladeshi politician

BK Das was a Bengali bureaucrat and adviser, with the rank of minister, of Shahabuddin Ahmed caretaker government.

== Early life ==
Das was born in 1943 in Sylhet, East Bengal, British India. He graduated from the University of Dhaka.

== Career ==
Das was a judge in the Bangladesh High Court for 12 years. He would then serve in the Bangladesh Supreme Court, Appellate Division. In 2010 he was appointed the chairman of Bangladesh Press Council.

== Death ==
Das died on 12 June 2014.
