= S M Masud Hossain Dolon =

Justice of the High Court Division of Bangladesh

Personal details
- Born: January 1, 1973 (age 53)
- Profession: Judge

S M Masud Hossain Dolon is a judge of the High Court Division of the Bangladesh Supreme Court.

== Early life ==
Dolon was born on 1 January 1973. He did his Bachelor of Law from the University of Wolverhampton. He did a Bar Vocational Course from Northumbria University and joined Lincoln's Inn.

== Career ==
Dolon became a lawyer of the District Courts on 5 August 2003 and the High Court Division on 17 April 2004.

In February 2011, Dolon was elected assistant secretary of Bangladesh Supreme Court Bar Association.

Dolon became a lawyer of the Appellate Division of the Supreme Court on 21 December 2015. In 2017, he filed the S. M. Masud Hossain Dolon and others Vs. Government of Bangladesh and others case which resulted in a verdict limited the weight of schoolbags, children took to school, in Bangladesh.

Dolon was appointed an additional Judge of the High Court Division on 31 July 2022 by President Mohammad Abdul Hamid. In September, Dolon and Justice Md Mostafizur Rahman confirmed the death penalty of four Jamaat-ul-Mujahideen Bangladesh members for killing Kunio Hoshi, a Japanese man, in 2015. In November, Dolon and Justice ASM Abdul Mobin stayed a defamation case against Mohammad Jahangir Alam, former Mayor of Gazipur, in a case filed for allegedly making defamatory comments about founding President of Bangladesh Sheikh Mujibur Rahman.

Dolon and Justice Md. Badruzzaman wanted to know about steps taken to make handwritten autopsy reports readable at a bail hearing in January 2023. Dolon and Justice Md. Badruzzaman expressed concern over receiving a call from Dhaka District police superintendent of the Police Bureau of Investigation to the deputy attorney general Sujit Kumar Chattarjee. The police officer called requesting an extension of a court deadline for sub-inspector Mizanur Rahman Sojib, the investigation officer of the Rubel murder case. The bench also ordered the suspension of the investigation officer of the case in Manikganj Sub-Inspector Masud Rana. The court was also critical of investigator sub inspector Masudur Rahman describing his investigation as "cinematic". Dolon and Justice Md Badruzzaman stopped the Digital Security Act case against Didarul Islam Bhuiyan of Rastrachinta.
