= M A Khaleq =

Bangladeshi politician

M A Khaleq (1921–2008) was a judge and adviser, with the rank of minister, of Shahabuddin Ahmed Cabinet.

== Early life ==
Khaleq was born in 1921 in Sonarai, Domar Upazila, Nilphamari District, East Bengal, British India. He graduated from Carmichael College in Rangpur. He completed his masters and law degree from University of Calcutta.

== Career ==
In 1947, Khaleq joined the judicial branch of the East Pakistan Civil Service. From 1956 to 1966, he was served as the Secretary of East Pakistan Assembly. He then served as Sessions and District Judge. He retired from judicial service 1983. He worked at the Administrative Appellate Tribunal. He was commissioner of the Journalists' Wage Board Commission. He was a member of the Dhaka Shishu Hospital trustee board. He was an advisor in charge of the Ministry of Law, Justice and Parliamentary Affairs in the Shahabuddin Ahmed Cabinet.

== Death ==
Khaleq died on 4 January 2008. His eldest daughter, Shaheen Sultana, is married to Abul Hassan Mahmood Ali.
