= Zakir Ahmed Khan =

Bangladesh politician

Zakir Ahmed Khan is the Finance secretary of Bangladesh, and Chairman of the Palli Karma-Sahayak Foundation. He is a former chairman of the National Board of Revenue. He is an adviser to Southeast Bank and an independent director of the National Life Insurance Company Limited.

== Early life ==
Khan did his master's degree in economics at the University of Dhaka. He completed an MBA at the Vrije Universiteit Brussel.

== Career ==
Khan was a Research Associate in the Bureau of Economic Research. He worked as a lecturer of Economics and in the Department of Finance at the University of Dhaka. In 1970, he joined the Pakistan Audit and Accounts Service of Pakistan Civil Service.

From 1 August 2000 to 10 July 2001, Khan was the chairman of the National Board of Revenue. He served as the secretary of the Internal Resources Division.

On 1 July 2001, Khan was appointed secretary of the Ministry of Finance replacing Akbar Ali Khan. He served as the secretary of Finance till 31 July 2005 and was replaced by Siddiqur Rahman Chowdhury. He had served under Minister of Finance M Saifur Rahman.

Khan retired as an Alternate Executive Director of the World Bank in February 2009. He was appointed an advisor of Southeast Bank Limited in October 2010. He is an independent director of the National Life Insurance Company Limited.

In December 2018, Khan was appointed an independent director of MI Cement Factory Ltd (Crown Cement). In 2019, he was elected president of the Salimullah Muslim Hall Alumni Association of Dhaka University.

After the fall of the Sheikh Hasina led Awami League government, Khan was appointed chairman of a special committee that looked at claims by retired public servants who alleged they were denied promotions during the 15 year rule of the Awami League government. Over 1500 retired civil servants applied for retrospective promotions and the committee recommended promotions for 764 of the applicants. In August 2024, he was appointed Chairman of the Palli Karma-Sahayak Foundation. He replaced Sheikh Abdur Rashid who was shifted to the Secondary and Higher Education Division.
