= Chowdhury A K M Aminul Haque =

Bangladeshi civil servant

- Born: 1934; Naopara, Louhajang Upazila, Munshiganj District, East Bengal, British India
- Occupation: Former minister of Ministry of Labour and Manpower

Chowdhury A K M Aminul Haque was a retired finance secretary and an advisor in the Shahabuddin Ahmed ministry in charge of Ministry of Labour and Manpower and the Internal Resources Division.

== Early life ==
Haque was born in 1934 in the Naopara, Louhajang Upazila, Munshiganj District, East Bengal, British India.

== Career ==
Haque was the secretary of the Internal Resources Division from 14 July 1987 to 1 July 1989. Again from 1 August 1990 to 30 December 1990.

== Death and legacy ==
Haque is remembered through the Chowdhury A K M Aminul Haque Memorial Lectures at North South University.
