= Iqbal Mahmood =

Bangladeshi civil servant

Dr. Iqbal Mahmood
- ড. ইকবাল মাহমুদ

5th Chairman of Anti-Corruption Commission
- In office 14 March 2016 – 9 March 2021
- Appointed by: Mohammad Abdul Hamid
- President: Mohammad Abdul Hamid
- Preceded by: M Badiuzzaman
- Succeeded by: Moinuddin Abdullah

Ministry of Communication

Secretary
- In office 26 October 2008 – 23 February 2009
- Appointed by: Golam Kader
- Preceded by: Muhammad Mahbubur Rahman
- Succeeded by: A.S.M Ali Kabir

Personal details
- Born: 1955 (age 70–71) Bangladesh
- Spouse: Dr. Khadija Begum
- Children: 2
- Education: University of Dhaka; University of New South Wales; Jahangirnagar University

Iqbal Mahmood is a retired Bangladeshi civil servant. He served as Chairman of the Anti-Corruption Commission, Bangladesh.

== Early life and education ==
Mahmood was born in Bangladesh in 1955. He had his preliminary schooling in Assasuni High School, Satkhira. He completed Intermediate studies (H.S.C) from Notre Dame College, Dhaka. He completed his BS and MS degrees in Public Administration from University of Dhaka. He also holds another master's degree in policy studies from the University of New South Wales, Australia with a specialization in international policy analysis and development. He completed his Ph.D. in public administration too.

== Career ==
Mahmood joined the civil service as a member of the Bangladesh Civil Service Administration Cadre in January 1981, and has since held various positions in the government of Bangladesh. He served as a Senior Secretary to the People's Republic of Bangladesh before his retirement from the civil service. He has worked with the Government of Bangladesh in different capacities from January 1981 to November 2014. He held top level positions in different ministries (Finance, Public Administration, Communications & Railways, and Posts & Telecommunications) of the Government.

After the fall of the Sheikh Hasina led Awami League government, a murder case was filed against Mahmood by Bangladesh Nationalist Party politician Mohammad Zaman Hossain Khan over the death of a protestor in July 2024.
