= Muhammad Abdul Mazid =

Muhammad Abdul Mazid is a retired secretary and former chairman of the National Board of Revenue. He is a former chairman of the Chittagong Stock Exchange. He is the chief coordinator of the Bangladesh Diabetic Samity.

== Early life ==
Mazid was born on 12 July 1953 in Shatkhira District, East Bengal, Pakistan. He did his bachelor's and master's in English literature at the University of Dhaka. He completed his PhD in social science.

== Career ==
From 1974 to 1980, Mazid worked at Bangladesh Bank.

Mazid joined the Bangladesh Civil Service in 1981 as an Audit and Accounts cadre.

From 1994 to 2000, Mazid was the commercial counselor at the Embassy of Bangladesh in Japan.

On 22 October 2007, Mazid was appointed the chairman of the National Board of Revenue replacing Badiur Rahman. Rahman resigned from government service following his transfer to the Ministry of Food and Disaster Management before his term had ended.

Mazid served till 8 April 2009 as chairman of the National Board of Revenue and was replaced by Nasiruddin Ahmed. He was appointed an officer on special duty at the Ministry of Public Administration.

Mazid joined the Bangladesh Diabetic Samity as chief coordinator in December 2010. In February 2014, he was elected chairman of the Chittagong Stock Exchange. He was appointed a director of the exchange by Bangladesh Securities and Exchange Commission. He launched a new logo for the exchange.

Mazid is a director of the Centre for Governance Studies. He was appointed an advisor of the International Business Forum of Bangladesh in 2023. He is an advisor of A K Khan & Company.
