= Abdul Motaleb Sazzad Mahmud =

Director General of the Bangladesh Ansar and Village Defence Party

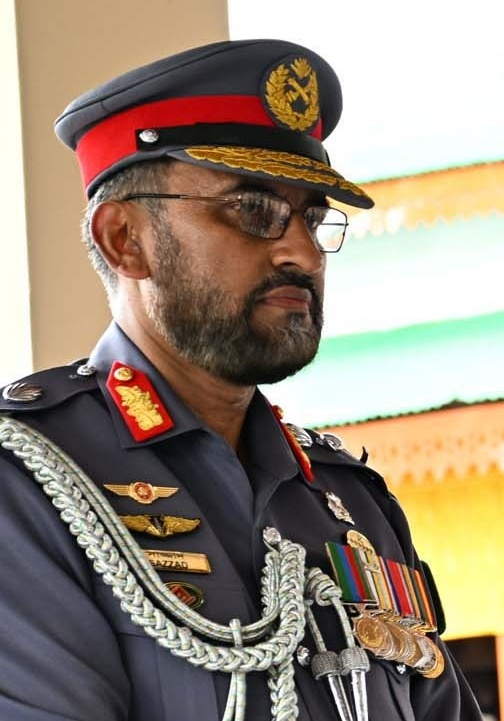
- Sazzad in 2026
- Born: 25 December 1971 (age 54); Chittagong, Bangladesh
- Education: Bangladesh Military Academy
- Military career
- Allegiance: Bangladesh
- Branch: Bangladesh Army; Bangladesh Ansar
- Service years: 1992 - present
- Rank: Major General
- Unit: East Bengal Regiment
- Commands: Commandant of Army School of Music; Commander of 203rd Infantry Brigade; Commandant of East Bengal Regimental Centre; Director General of Bangladesh Ansar and Village Defence Party
- Awards: Sena Gourab Padak (SGP)

Abdul Motaleb Sazzad Mahmud, SGP, BAM, ndu, afwc, psc, DS is a two star officer of the Bangladesh Army and incumbent director general of Bangladesh Ansar and Village Defence Party. Previously, he was the commandant of East Bengal Regimental Centre and Army School of Music.
