= Abul Hashem (banker) =

Bangladeshi academic and financier

Abul Hashem is an academic and chairman of BASIC Bank Limited. He is the Vice-Chancellor of Anwer Khan Modern University. He is a former Vice-Chancellor of the International University of Scholars. He is a former chairman of Dhaka Stock Exchange.

== Early life ==
Hashem was born on 31 January 1950 in Feni District, East Bengal, Pakistan. Hashem completed his master's degree in accounting from the University of Chittagong in 1971.

Hashem joined the University of Dhaka in the accounting department as a lecturer in 1974.

Hashem completed his doctorate in accounting at the Plekhanov Russian University of Economics in 1981.

== Career ==
Hashem became a professor at the University of Dhaka in 1992.

In 2010, Hashem was appointed a Director of Dhaka Stock Exchange.

In 2011, Hashem was appointed member of the University Grants Commission.

From 13 February 2017 to 12 February 2020, Hashem served as the Chairman of Dhaka Stock Exchange. He had faced question over the appointment of Kazi Sanaul Hoq as the managing director of Dhaka Stock Exchange. Md Eunusur Rahman replaced him as chairman of Dhaka Stock Exchange.

Hashem was appointed chairman of BASIC Bank Limited on 15 September 2020.
