= A K Azizul Huq =

Former government official

A. K. Azizul Huq was the third Comptroller and Auditor General of Bangladesh. Huq also served as the secretary of the Internal Resources Division in the Ministry of Finance, Chairman of the National Board of Revenue, and additional secretary of the Ministry of Finance.

== Early life ==
Huq was born on 29 March 1929. He had bachelor's and master's degrees in English literature from the University of Dhaka and a Diploma in Advanced Theory of Economic Development from the University of Manchester.

== Career ==
Huq worked as an English lecturer at a public college. In 1954, he joined the Pakistan Military Accounts Service. He was included in the Economic Pool of Pakistan.

Huq joined the Ministry of Finance as a Deputy Secretary. From 14 February 1980 to 31 December 1982, he was the secretary of the Internal Resources Division.

Huq took the oath of office as Comptroller and Auditor General of Bangladesh on 1 January 1983 and retired on 29 March 1989. He was a member of the United Nations Board of Audit.

== Personal life ==
Huq was married to Hamida Begum. After she died in 1985, he stopped all writing, including his diary.

== Death ==
Azizul Huq died on 19 July 2013.
