= 2011 Bangladesh share market scam =

Stock market instability, 2009 to 2011

The 2010-11 Bangladesh share market scam was a period of instability in the stock market from 2009 to 2011; the turmoil occurred in both stock exchanges of Bangladesh, Dhaka Stock Exchange and Chittagong Stock Exchange. The market rose 62% in 2009, and 83% in 2010, but then declined 10% in January 2011, and a further 30% in February 2011. The crash is deemed to be a scam and exacerbated due to government failure.

== Background ==
The stock market was in turbulence throughout much of 2009, with the long bullish trend starting to turn grim. The bullish trend was initiated by the end of the two-year political crisis and re-emergence of democracy when Awami League won the December 2008 polls, and was largely unaffected by the BDR Mutiny. The market was heavily aided by the entrance of Grameenphone into the capital market, when the index rose by 22% over a single day on 16 November 2009. Share prices continued to fluctuate, reaching the annual high in mid-2009 before plummeting by the end of 2009, with retail investors threatening a hunger strike. Notably, Bangladesh also faced such a stock market crash in 1996. Coincidentally, Awami League have been at government during both of the crashes.

The market continued to be turbulent throughout 2010, with the Nitul hitting its all-time high revenue and the largest fall in a single day since the 1996 market crash, within the space of a month.

== Slump ==
By the end of 2010, it was well known that the capital markets of Bangladesh were overvalued and overheated. The central bank had taken measures to cool the market down and control inflation by putting a leash on the liquidity.

The conservative monetary measures adversely affected the capital market, with the market falling once on 13 December by 285 points, over 3% of the DGEN Index which stood at around 8,500 points. The capital markets suffered a second fall on 19 December, with the index falling a further 551 points, or about 7%. This 7% fall in the Dhaka Stock Exchange's index on a single day was the largest fall in the 55-year history of the Exchange, surpassing the fall of the 1996 market crash. This fall was deemed 'normal' by analysts, who believed the market was overvalued.

Investors took to the streets with protests. Miscellaneous objects like wood and papers were set on fire in front of the DSE office in Motijheel.

Immediate measures were taken by the regulatory body the Bangladesh Securities and Exchange Commission, which, together with the Bangladesh Bank, laxed its earlier conservative measures to pacify the fall. As a result, the market ameliorated the next day by 1.9%.

Within December 2010 and January 2011, the DGEN index fell from 8,500 by 1,800 points, a total 21% fall, with masterminds of the crash making about BDT 50 billion ($ 667 million) out of the scam.

The market fell by 5% on 12 June, before taking a 4% plunge on 11 October, sending the market into further turmoil. The fall finally triggered small investors to go on a fast-unto-death on 16 October after forming the Bangladesh Capital Market Investors' Council. Opposition politicians declared their solidarity with the protesters. The market stood at around 5,500 index points in October 2011 from 8,900 only a year ago.

Protests continued throughout the months, the most recent ones taking place in front of the DSE office in November 2011, with protesters sitting in throughout nights.

== Protests ==
Protests on the streets started becoming a common scene contiguous to the DSE office. The protests continued for days in January and February, often resulting in clashes between the police and the protesters.

After the market fell further subsequently, small investors started going on hunger strikes separately, before forming the Bangladesh Capital Market Investors' Council on 16 October and going on a fast-unto-death. Opposition politicians declared their solidarity with the protesters.

Protesters stayed overnight by the DSE office starting 16 October and were dispersed on day two by the baton-charging police. Protesters, including the head of the council, were arrested, although the police denied arresting any protester. Protesters also demanded complete trade suspension at the DSE until the Prime Minister intervened to fix the market.

Finance Minister Muhith faced staunch criticism for the handling of the market crash; he admitted his failure in attending the debacle. He also attracted criticism for refusing to disclose the names of those accused of chicanery by the probe committee in April 2011. Protests were also fueled by the Finance Minister's comments on the secondary markets in October 2011, when he said, "I don't know how it will get right." Opposition and protesting investors had called for his resignation.

== Probe ==
A probe committee was formed to investigate the stock market crash on 24 January 2011, with former Bangladesh Bank Governor Ibrahim Khaled heading the four-man high-powered committee.

The committee provided their findings after three months, on 7 April. It identified an array of chicanery performed by some 60 influential individuals that resulted in the recent market crash. The committee interviewed all members of both the DSE and CSE, and consulted journalists and analysts before presenting their report. The committee found various irregularities, including the existence of omnibus accounts, that allowed some market players to make exorbitant profits at the expense of the retail investors. Among the 60 identified primarily included chairman of Beximco and the mastermind of the 1996 market crash Salman F Rahman, former DSE president Rakibur Rahman, SEC chairman Ziaul Khandaker, SEC member Mansur Alam and BNP politician Mosaddek Ali Falu. The report mentioned that pro-government business tycoons, including Salman and Rakibur, exerted influence within the SEC by influencing the appointment of its members. The report ended with recommendations to reform the SEC drastically and asked the government to publish the names of the influential players and to remain cognizant in countering their influences.

The report resulted in the dismissal of SEC chairman Ziaul along with other SEC members accused. However, the Finance Minister AMA Muhith stated that the State would neither disclose the names of the accused officially nor take punitive measures without further investigation, although no dates for fresh probes have been declared. M Khairul Hossain was appointed as the replaced for Ziaul.

== Bailout ==
The market stabilisation fund (MSF) was conceived by the Bangladesh Association of Banks (BAB) in late October 2011 as a method to increase liquidity in the market and increase share prices, worth BDT 50 billion ($ 667 million). Banks have reportedly kept buying shares despite suffering from liquidity crises themselves, and not selling any shares. However, share indices kept plummeting throughout the time period. However, prices rose by 7% ahead of the Prime Minister's emergency meeting about the market.
