= M. A. Majed =

Bangladeshi doctor and political adviser

Adviser

M. A. Majed was a doctor and adviser, with the rank of minister, of the Shahabuddin Ahmed interim government.

== Career ==
Majed was the principal of the Dhaka Medical College and Hospital. He served as the dean of the school of medicine at University of Dhaka. He had served as the president of Bangladesh Medical Association three times. He was an important leader of the pro-democracy movement of doctors against President Hussain Mohammad Ershad.

== Death ==
Majed died on 9 July 2017.
