= AKM Musa =

Bangladeshi politician

A.K.M. Musa, also known as Abul Khayer Musa, is a Bangladeshi retired career bureaucrat and former adviser, with the rank of minister, of Shahabuddin Ahmed ministry. He served as the Minister of Industry and the Minister of Textiles and Jute.

Musa was killed by his son on 24 April 2003 at his residence in Gulshan. His son, who is addicted to narcotics, had demanded money from him. Musa's wife, Rokeya Begum, was injured in the incident.
