= 1994 Bangladesh Ansar mutiny =

Failed paramilitary mutiny

1994 Bangladesh Ansar Mutiny
Date	1-4 December 1994
Location	Shafipur and Khilgaon, Bangladesh
Result	Defeat of the Ansar mutineers

Belligerents
Government of Bangladesh; Bangladesh Rifles; Bangladesh Police; Bangladesh Air Force	Mutineers from the Bangladesh Ansar

Strength
Unknown	At least 42 mutineers

Casualties and losses
Unknown	1-2 mutineers dead, 12-40 mutineers injured

The Bangladesh Ansar mutiny was a mutiny staged from 1 December to 4 December 1994, in Shafipur and Khilgaon by a section of the Bangladesh Ansar, a paramilitary force tasked with providing security to government installations and aiding law enforcement in Bangladesh. The mutiny prompted a series of reforms by the government.

== Background ==
The Ansar force was formed as the "East Pakistan Ansars" by the East Pakistan Ansars Act of 1948, and officially launched on 12 February 1948. From 1948 to 1972, it was under the National Service Board. In 1973, it was placed under the Ministry of Home Affairs and an Ansar cadre was formed in the Bangladesh Civil Service. Together with its sister organization Village Defence Party, it has millions of members including reserves.

== Events ==
The Bangladesh Ansar mutinied in the Ansar Academy in Shafipur, and Khilgaon on 1 December 1994, demanding higher pay, job security and better treatment from officers. The mutiny was ended on 4 December 1994, when a military operation was launched by Bangladesh Rifles, supported by the Bangladesh Police and helicopters from Bangladesh Air Force. Official estimates place the death toll at 1 or 2 and 12-40 Ansar personnel were injured. Independent estimates place 30 mutineers among the casualty.

== Aftermath ==
Journalist and social critic, Farhad Mazhar, called the mutiny inevitable because of the social discrimination faced by members of Bangladesh Ansar. He was jailed for his views on the mutiny.

=== Reform ===
In response to the agitations, the government passed a series of acts in the Jatiya Sangsad. These include Ansar Bahini Act (1995), Battalion Ansar Act (1995) and the Village Defence Party Act (1995). Under these acts, the Ansar Bahini and the Battalion Ansars were declared a "Disciplined Force" in accordance with article 152 of the Constitution. The government set up Ansar VDP Bank where the members of Ansar-VDP were decided to be the shareholders. The bank also provides soft loans to Ansar members.
