= Sheikh A. K. Motahar Hossain =

Sheikh A. K. Motahar Hossain is the retired secretary and former National Board of Revenue Chairman. He is a former secretary of the Ministry of Shipping. He was a member of the Bangladesh Privatisation Commission.

== Career ==
Hossain was the joint secretary of the Ministry of Education in 2003.

In November 2005, Hossain was promoted to additional secretary while serving as the Director General of the Food, Planning and Monitoring Unit. He was the secretary of the Ministry of Chittagong Hill Tract Affairs and the Ministry of Housing and Public Works.

On 9 January 2007, Hossain was appointed the chairman of the National Board of Revenue replacing A. F. M. Solaiman Chowdhury. He served as the chairman till 22 October 2007 and was replaced by Badiur Rahman. He was secretary of the Implementation, Monitoring and Evaluation Division.

Hossain served as the secretary of the Bangladesh Planning Commission. As Shipping secretary, Hossain proposed turning Bangladesh Shipping Corporation into a public limited company.

In September 2009, Hossain and former shipping advisor M. A. Matin were sued by M/S Everest Enterprise on allegations of rigging a contract. He was a member of the Bangladesh Privatisation Commission under Chairman Dr Mirza Abdul Jalil. He was replaced by Mohammad Mohsin in the Privatisation Commission in January 2010 after being made an officer on special duty.

In 2011, Judge Mohammad Mohsinul Haque of the Second Joint District Judge's Court asked Hossain and the former advisor in charge of the Ministry of Shipping M. A. Matin to pay 250 million BDT for not selecting the lowest bidder for a contractor at Chittagong Port in 2008. They filed an appeal against the verdict and it was rejected.
