= Mashiur Rahman (adviser) =

Bangladeshi politician

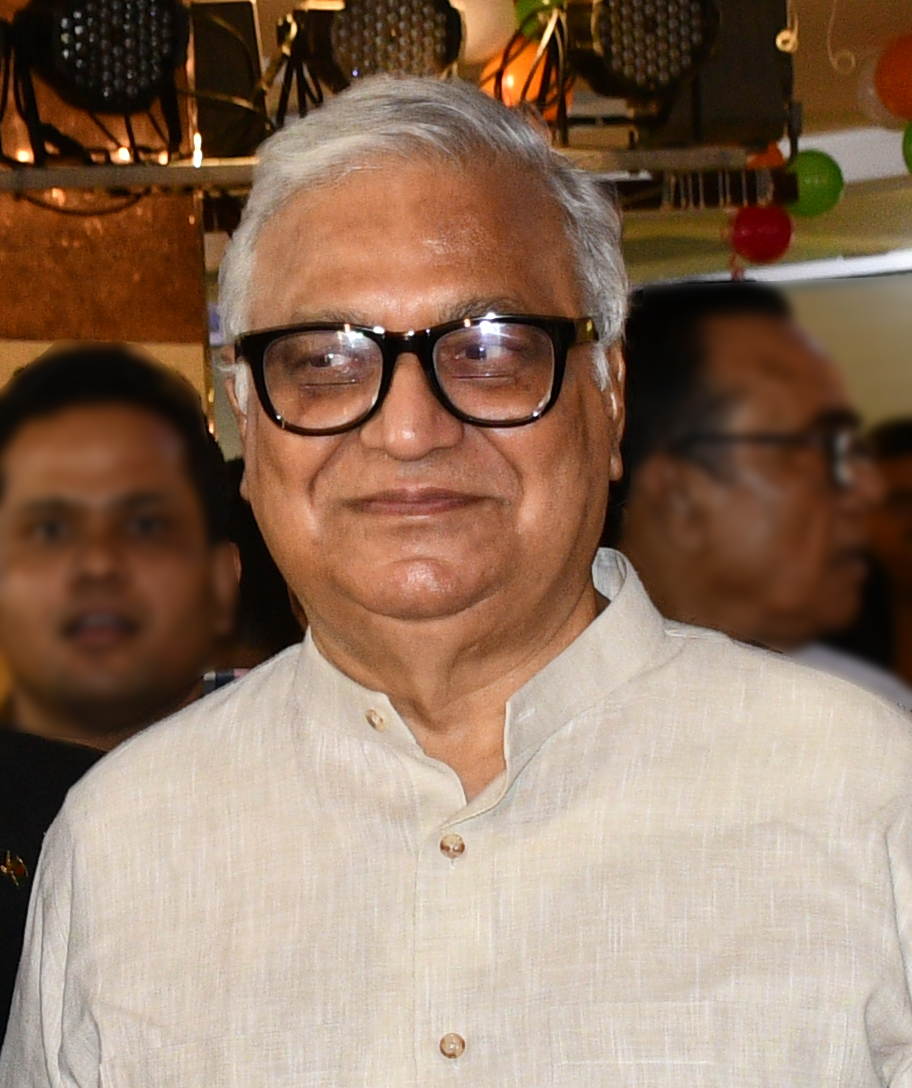

Economic Affairs Advisor to the Prime Minister of Bangladesh
- In office 11 January 2024 – 5 August 2024
- Prime Minister: Sheikh Hasina
- Preceded by: Himself
- Succeeded by: TBA
- In office 12 January 2014 – 29 November 2023
- Prime Minister: Sheikh Hasina
- Preceded by: Office established
- Succeeded by: Himself

Personal details
- Party: Bangladesh Awami League

Mashiur Rahman is a former Bangladesh Awami League politician, former secretary and former economic affairs adviser to the former Prime Minister of Bangladesh Sheikh Hasina.

== Early career ==
Mashiur Rahman was a former officer of CSP. After the end of 1971 Liberation War, he was appointed the private secretary to President Sheikh Mujibur Rahman. During his tenure, he was posted in various posts of the central government. He was the chairman of National Board of Revenue and secretary of Internal Resources Division. After the victory of Awami League in 7th national general election in June 1996, he was posted as the secretary of Economic Relations Division. Mashiur Rahman retired from service in 2001.

== Political career ==
Mashiur Rahman has voiced support for Rampal Power Plant in the Sundarbans. He is the incumbent economic affairs adviser (Cabinet Minister rank) to Prime Minister Sheikh Hasina. He was the chief election commissioner in the Awami League council elections in October 2016. He was accused of being involved in the Padma Bridge Scandal. He was later acquitted by a Canadian court which found no proof of corruption regarding Padma Bridge scandal. He was appointed to an adviser post in 2014 with the rank of a minister. On November 19th, 2023, Rahman resigned and was “asked to step down” from his position as the Prime Minister’s Economic Affairs Advisor.
