= Ghulam Rahman =

- গোলাম রহমান

3rd Chairman of Anti-Corruption Commission
- In office 1 May 2009 – 23 June 2013
- Appointed by: Zillur Rahman
- President: Zillur Rahman; Mohammad Abdul Hamid
- Preceded by: Hasan Mashhud Chowdhury
- Succeeded by: M Badiuzzaman

Ghulam Rahman (Bengali: গোলাম রহমান) is a former government secretary at the Ministry of Shipping and president of the Consumers Association of Bangladesh. He is the former chairman of the Anti-Corruption Commission and Bangladesh Energy Regulatory Commission.

== Career ==
Rahman taught economics at the University of Dhaka in the 1960s after which he joined the Central Superior Services of Pakistan.

Rahman retired as secretary of the Ministry of Shipping in 2004.

In 2007, the caretaker government appointed Rahman chairman of Bangladesh Energy Regulatory Commission.

On 1 May 2009, Rahman was appointed chairman of the Anti-Corruption Commission. Rahman replaced Hasan Mashhud Chowdhury. The government of Bangladesh also downgraded the status of the post from that of a minister to that of a judge of Bangladesh Supreme Court.

In 2013, Rahman said that the Anti-Corruption Commission had become "toothless" due to its weak ability to prosecute suspects. He had in the past blamed the judiciary for failure to reduce corruption. On 23 June, he completed his 4-year term as chairman of the Anti-Corruption Commission.

Rahman became president of the Consumers Association of Bangladesh in August 2014 after the death of the last president, Quazi Faruque.

On 8 December 2021, Rahman was re-elected president of the Consumers Association of Bangladesh.
