= Credit Rating Agency of Bangladesh Limited =

The Credit Rating Agency of Bangladesh Ltd. (CRAB) is the leading credit rating company in Bangladesh.

== Overview ==
CRAB is a technical partner of ICRA Limited, India. The company was promoted by some of the leading industrial and business personalities of the country as well as institutional investors.

CRAB is an external credit assessment institution accredited by Bangladesh Bank, the central bank of Bangladesh. This allows the company's ratings to be used by banks and financial institutions for capital adequacy reporting under Basel 2 and 3.

It is also accredited with Insurance Development & Regulatory Authority of Bangladesh for rating of insurance companies.

By 2014, CRAB had rated more than 4,000 entities and instruments across a wide spectrum of industries, including agro inputs, automotive, cement, cold storage, textile, garments, engineering, rice mill, food and allied, pharmaceuticals, telecom, steel, trading, banks, FIs, MFIs, insurances and utilities (power, oil & gas, and transportation).

CRAB's highly specialized analyst teams servicing clients across the country and thereby ensuring comprehensive geographic coverage. CRAB's ratings are used extensively by all kinds of investors and lenders to assess risks associated with credit or investment decisions. Besides, CRAB's ratings and consultancy are also used as key inputs for strategic purposes by players in the corporate, public finance, financial, infrastructure and utilities, and structured finance sectors, among others.
