= Investment Corporation of Bangladesh =

Government owned financial institution

Investment Corporation of Bangladesh (ICB)
- Company type: Statutory corporation Public
- Traded as: DSE: ICB
- Industry: Merchant banking, mutual fund, financial services, investment banking
- Founded: 1976; 50 years ago
- Headquarters: BDBL Bhaban, 8, Rajuk Avenue, Dhaka, Bangladesh
- Key people: Professor Abu Ahmed, Chairman; Niranjan Chandra Debnath,FCMA; Managing Director
- Services: Investment banking, Asset management, portfolio management
- Subsidiaries: ICB Capital Management Ltd. (ICML), ICB Asset Management Company Ltd.(IAMCL), and ICB Securities Trading Company Ltd. (ISTCL)
- Website: icb.gov.bd

Investment Corporation of Bangladesh (ICB) (Bengali: বাংলাদেশ বিনিয়োগ সংস্থা) is a statutory corporation of Government of the People's Republic of Bangladesh, established on 1 October 1976 under No. 40 of Investment Corporation of Bangladesh Ordinance, 1976. It is mainly an investment bank operating in Bangladesh, established to accelerate the pace of industrialization and to develop a sound securities market in Bangladesh. ICB is one of the largest investors in share market of Bangladesh. Investing in share market, providing loans and advances, acting as manager/trustee/custodian of mutual funds are some of main activities of ICB. It's the most successful state-owned corporation of Bangladesh in terms of profitability. Classification of shareholders, as on 30 June 2013, shows that Government of the People's Republic of Bangladesh holds 27% of the shares of ICB and it is enlisted in Dhaka and Chittagong stock exchanges.

== Subsidiaries ==
After twenty-four years of establishment, the company has brought reform in its strategy and policy for conducting commercial activities by forming and managing several subsidiary companies under the Investment Corporation of Bangladesh (Amendment) Act, 2000 (the Act No. 24 of 2000).

The companies are:

1. ICB Capital Management Ltd. (ICML)
2. ICB Asset Management Company Ltd. (IAMCL)
3. ICB Securities Trading Company Ltd. (ISTCL).

== Investment Corporation of Bangladesh Bill, 2014 ==
In July 2014, a bill titled Investment Corporation of Bangladesh Bill, 2014 was placed by Finance Minister Abul Maal Abdul Muhith in parliament aiming to encourage investment in the country, develop the capital market and collect savings. The move comes as the government looks to have a functional ICB ordinance in place after the Investment Corporation of Bangladesh Ordinance, 1976 was declared illegal due to its issuance during the military regime (1975–1981). Therefore, this bill is aimed to replace the 'Investment Corporation of Bangladesh Ordinance, 1976'.

== Milestones ==
CL	Milestones	Date/establishment commencement
1	Establishment of ICB	1 October 1976
2	lnvestors' Scheme	13 June 1977
3	ICB Chittagong Branch	1 April 1980
4	First ICB Mutual Fund	25 April 1980
5	ICB Unit Fund	10 April 1981
6	ICB Rajshahi Branch	9 February 1984
7	Second ICB Mutual Fund	17 June 1984
8	Third ICB Mutual Fund	19 May 1985
9	ICB Khulna Branch	10 September 1985
10	ICB Sylhet Branch	15 December 1985
11	Fourth ICB Mutual Fund	6 June 1986
12	Fifth ICB Mutual Fund	8 June 1987
13	Sixth ICB Mutual Fund	16 May 1988
14	ICB Barisal Branch	31 May 1988
15	ICB as the country's Nodal DFI in SADF	7 May 1992
16	Seventh ICB Mutual Fund	30 June 1995
17	Eighth ICB Mutual Fund	23 July 1996
18	ICB Bogra Branch	6 October 1996
19	ICB Local Office, Dhaka	15 April 1997
20	Purchase of own Land with Building (Rajarbag)	11 December 1997
21	Participation in Equity of SARF	16 January 1998
22	Advance Against ICB Unit Certificates Scheme	12 October 1998
23	Lease Financing Scheme	22 April 1999
24	"The Investment Corporation of Bangladesh (Amendment)Act, 2000"	6 July 2000
25	Registration of the three Subsidiary Companies with the Registrar of Joint Stock Companies and Firms	5 December 2000
26	ICB Capital Management Ltd.	1 July 2002
27	ICB Asset Management Company Ltd.	1 July 2002
28	ICB Securities Trading Company Ltd.	13 August 2002
29	Registration as a Trustee with SEC	20 August 2002
30	Registration as a Custodian with SEC	20 August 2002
31	Bank Guarantee Scheme	21 June 2003
32	Advance Against ICB Mutual Fund/ICB AMCL Unit certificates scheme	21 June 2003
33	Consumers Credit Scheme	15 February 2004
34	Venture Capital Financing Scheme	26 April 2007
35	Purchase of Land(Agargaon)	3 March 2008
36	Commencement of management of Equity and Entrepreneurship Fund (EEF)	1 June 2009
37	Launching of Tk. 50 Billion Bangladesh Fund	5 May 2011
38	Finalization ICB's Building Design	12 April 2012
39	New Centre for In-House Training	28 June 2013
40	The Investment Corporation of Bangladesh-2014, Act Passed on parliament	July 2014

== See also ==
- Bangladesh Bank
- List of banks in Bangladesh
- Dhaka Stock Exchange
- Chittagong Stock Exchange
- Bangladesh Securities and Exchange Commission
