= M Badiuzzaman =

Bangladeshi politician

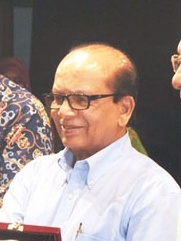
- Badiuzzaman in 2015

4th Chairman of the Anti-Corruption Commission
- In office 26 June 2013 – 13 March 2016
- Appointed by: President of Bangladesh
- President: Mohammad Abdul Hamid
- Preceded by: Ghulam Rahman
- Succeeded by: Iqbal Mahmood

Personal details
- Born: 8 January 1944 (age 82) Lakshmipur, Bengal Presidency (present day Bangladesh)
- Children: 3
- Education: University of Dhaka

M Badiuzzaman is a former chairman of the Anti-Corruption Commission in Bangladesh.

== Career ==
Badiuzzaman joined the then East Pakistan Civil Service in 1968. He served in various districts of the country as a Magistrate, SDO (Sub-Divisional Officer), Additional District Administrator, and District Administrator. He also held several important responsibilities in the government as Deputy Secretary, Joint Secretary, and Additional Secretary. In this regard, he served as Director General of the Prime Minister's Office (twice) and as Director General of the Anti-Corruption Bureau. He retired from government service in 2001 upon reaching the regular retirement age.

Badiuzzaman was the chairman of Mirpur Unnayan Parishad. He supported Syed Mohammad Ibrahim launching the Bangladesh Kallyan Party.

Badiuzzaman was appointed chairman of the Anti-Corruption Commission on 24 June 2013. He replaced Ghulam Rahman. He focused on preventing money laundering which 226 investigation in 2015 an increase from 39 in 2012. He investigated former members of parliament and ministers. He led the commission into investigating Friends of Liberation War Honour award.

In December 2018, Badiuzzaman expressed support for the Awami League ahead of the national elections. He spoke against the Parliamentary Standing Committee on Law, Justice and Parliamentary Affairs Ministry recommendation of cancelling the registration of Transparency International Bangladesh. He saw the filling of 56 cases related to the BASIC Bank Limited scam.

In March 2016, Iqbal Mahmood replaced Badiuzzaman as chairman of the Anti-Corruption Commission.
