= Khilgaon Thana =

Thana in Dhaka South City Corporation, Bangladesh

Khilgaon Thana খিলগাঁও থানা
- Thana
- Interactive map of Khilgaon Thana
- Coordinates: 23.75083333°N 90.42638889°E
- Country: Bangladesh
- Division: Dhaka Division
- District: Dhaka District
- Formed: 1988

Area
  - Total: 14.83 km^{2} (5.73 sq mi)
- Elevation: 23 m (75 ft)

Population (2022)
  - Total: 380,740
  - Density: 25,670/km^{2} (66,490/sq mi)
- Time zone: UTC+6 (BST)
- Postal code: 1219
- Area code: 02

Khilgaon (Bengali: খিলগাঁও) is a thana (police jurisdiction) and neighbourhood in the city of Dhaka, Bangladesh. The thana encompasses Dhaka South City Corporation wards 24, 25, and 26. In 2022, it had a population of about 380 thousand.

== Geography ==
Khilgaon is bounded by Badda Thana on the north, Motijheel Thana, Sabujbagh Thana and Demra Thana on the south, Rupganj Upazila on the east and Rampura Thana on the west. Its total area is 14.83 square kilometres (5.73 sq mi).

== History ==
During the 17th century, Khilgaon thrived as a bustling trading hub, situated alongside the now-defunct Pandu river. Few families inhabited this uneven terrain, and agriculture was virtually non-existent. The name Khilgaon originated from Bengali, where khil refers to uncultivated land and gaon means village, reflecting its rural origins. Despite evolving into a significant settlement within the megacity, the name has endured. Later on, a prominent Chowdhury family acquired extensive landholdings and established their residence here, lending its name to the Chowdhury Para locality.

In 1988, Khilgaon Thana was formed comprising parts of Sabujbagh, Rampura and Demra thanas.

== Demographics ==
Religions in Khilgaon Thana (2022)
Religion	Percent
Islam	97.93%
Hinduism	1.99%
Other or not stated	0.08%

According to the 2022 Bangladeshi census, Khilgaon Thana had 99,235 households and a population of 380,747. 7.62% of the population were under 5 years of age. Khilgaon had a literacy rate (age 7 and over) of 85.33%: 86.21% for males and 84.32% for females, and a sex ratio of 113.40 males for every 100 females.

== Points of interest ==
In the mid-2010s, the 1.85-kilometer Shaheed Baki Road and 300-meter Chowdhury Para Road gained prominence as a renowned food street. Established in 1986, the Taltola City Corporation Super Market occupies a sprawling 4.45-acre area, housing a total of 858 shops, and has become a favoured shopping destination. Additionally, Khilgaon Thana hosts the HQ of Bangladesh Ansar.

== Transportation ==
Rickshaws, CNGs are always available. There are also some buses available which includes Midline, Bahon, Turag, Noor-E-Mekkah, Raida, Labbaik, Talukdar etc. These buses link between Khilgaon, Farmgate, Nilkhet, Motijheel, Dhanmondi, Mohammadpur, Badda, Gulshan, Mirpur, Moghbazar and many other places.

The 1.9-kilometre (1.2 mi) Khilgaon Flyover, built in 2005 with the aim of easing traffic congestion, is located in this area.

== See also ==
- Thanas of Bangladesh
- Pilkhana, Bangladesh
- Thana Nirbahi Officer
- Administrative geography of Bangladesh
