= Badiur Rahman =

Bangladeshi civil servant

Badiur Rahman is the secretary and chairman of the Bangladesh National Board of Revenue.

== Career ==
Rahman was the Additional Secretary of the Ministry of Disaster Management and Relief in 2003.

In 2005, Rahman was the Additional Secretary of the Economic Relations Division in the Ministry of Finance. He was secretary of the Planning Division. Rahman was appointed acting secretary of the Power Division in 2006.

Rahman was appointed chairman of the National Board of Revenue on 23 January 2007 replacing Sheikh A. K. Motahar Hossain.

Rahman wrote about transferring Matiur Rahman, a controversial customs officer and then joint commissioner of Chittagong port, from Chittagong to Rajshahi in his autobiography. He received calls from Brigadier General Mohammad Hasan Nasir, Major General Sina Ibn Jamali, and Chief of Bangladesh Army General Moeen U Ahmed. Rahman was transferred from the National Board of Revenue to the Ministry of Food and Disaster Management and Matiur Rahman was transferred back to Chittagong Port. Rahman resigned from government service while commenting that he had "failed to please his masters". He had also disagreed with policy proposals from the International Monetary Fund. He was made an officer on special duty and granted one-month leave.

On 22 October 2007, Muhammad Abdul Mazid replaced Rahman as chairman of the National Board of Revenue.
