= Ghulam Hussain (civil servant) =

Md. Ghulam Hussain is a retired secretary and former chairman of the National Board of Revenue. He is a former Secretary of the Ministry of Commerce.

== Early life ==
Hussain was born in Hasimpur, Kachua Upazila, Chandpur District. He studied at Hasimpur Primary School, Burgi High School, Hajigonj Pilot School, and Chandpur Government College. He did his master's degree in social sciences at the University of Dhaka.

== Career ==
Hussain joined the Bangladesh Civil Service as a customs and excise cadre in 1982.

In 1996, Hussain was the director of the Prime Minister's Office. From 1998 to 2003, Hussain served at the Embassy of Bangladesh in the United States.

Hussain worked at the International Trade Centre from 2004 to 2006 in the Export Diversification Project. In 2009, he served in the Bangladesh Rifles Mutiny investigation committee. He was an Additional Secretary at the Ministry of Home Affairs. He was the chairman of a team formed to dismantle the temporary Taskforce for Interrogation Cell at the Bangladesh Rifles headquarters after the mutiny.

Hussain was appointed chairman of the National Board of Revenue on 29 October 2012. He was serving as the secretary at the Ministry of Commerce. He replaced Nasiruddin Ahmed. He reduced corporate tax. Central Intelligence Cell sought his tax information in an unusual move as the cell is under the National Board of Revenue in November 2014. It also sought information on his wife's accounts.

Hussain served till 8 January 2015 as chairman of the National Board of Revenue when he was replaced by Md. Nojibur Rahman. From 2016 to 2019, he was the managing director of Infrastructure Investment Facilitation Company.

In November 2023, Hussain sought nomination from Awami League for Chandpur-1 to contest the 12th parliamentary election. He is the chairman of Business Insider Media Limited which publishes Business Insider Bangladesh.

== Personal life ==
Hussain is married to Professor Zakia Mansoor Hussain, a professor of economics.
