= Palli Karma Sahayak Foundation =

Financial institution founded by government of Bangladesh

Palli Karma-Sahayak Foundation
- পল্লী কর্ম-সহায়ক ফাউন্ডেশন
- PKSF logo
- Formation: 1990
- Headquarters: Agargaon, Dhaka, Bangladesh
- Region served: Bangladesh
- Official language: Bengali
- Chairman: Zakir Ahmed Khan
- Staff: 424
- Website: https://pksf.org.bd

Palli Karma-Sahayak Foundation (Bn: পল্লী কর্ম-সহায়ক ফাউন্ডেশন) or PKSF is a financial institution founded by the Government of Bangladesh to finance rural development and provide training and is located in Agargaon at the heart of Dhaka, Bangladesh. Zakir Ahmed Khan became chairman of Palli Karma Sahayak Foundation in September 2023. It offers financial and non-financial services to the rural people in Bangladesh.

== History ==
Palli Karma Sahayak Foundation was established on 1990 by the government of Bangladesh. The organization provides finances to Non-governmental organization that provide credit and non-financial services at the grassroots.

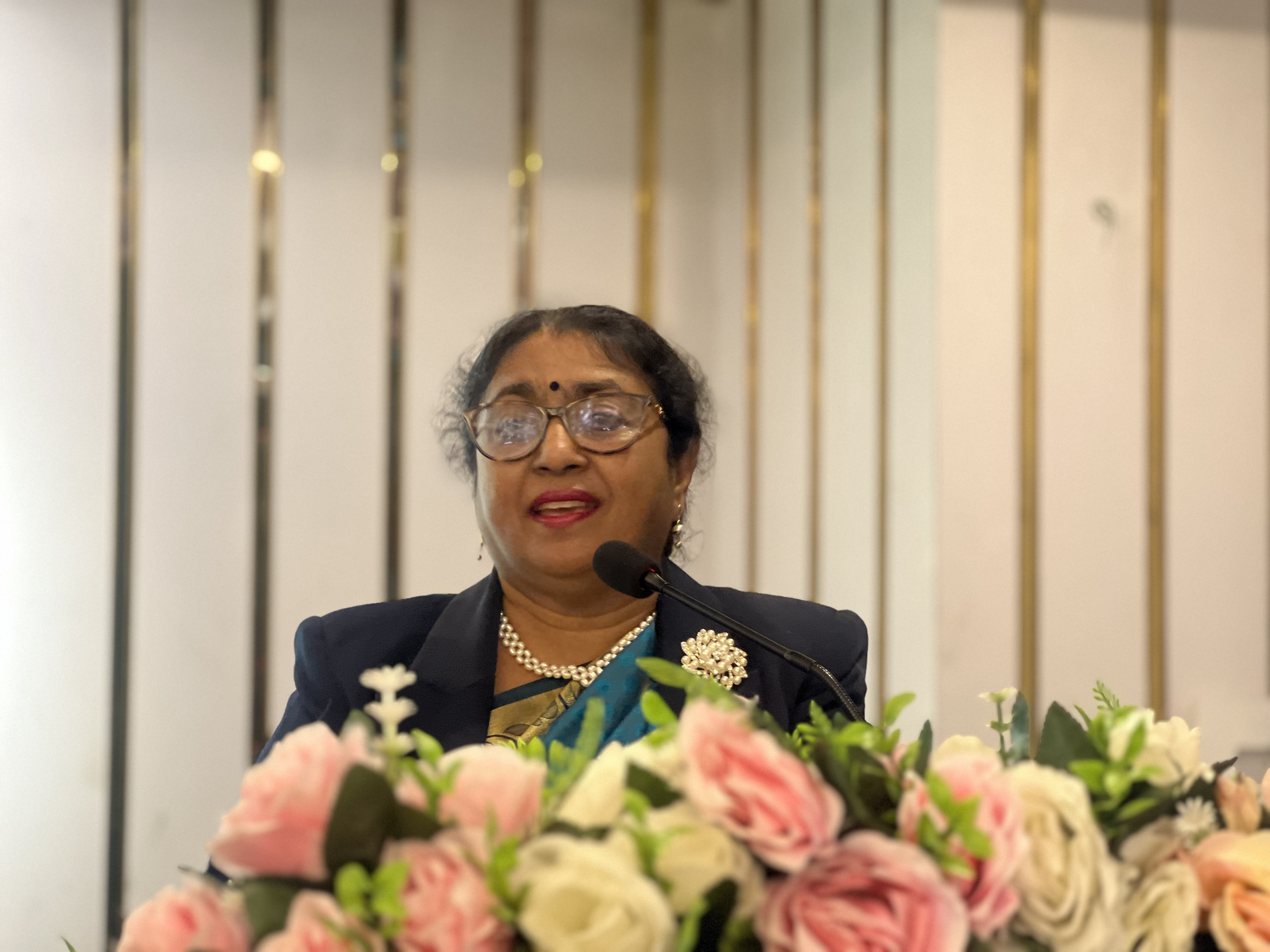
Managing Director of PKSF at Rajshahi

The Foundation received Nawab Ali Chowdhury National Award in 2012 for poverty alleviation. The foundation as of 2020 assists about 12 million households with financial and non-financial services. It is the largest agency for rural development in Bangladesh.

== List of chairmen ==
List of Former Chairpersons
Sl.	Name	Tenure (From)	Tenure (To)	Reference
1	M Syeduzzaman	2 May 1990	25 August 1993	
2	A. K. M. Nazrul Islam	29 November 1993	17 March 1996	
3	M M Rezaul Karim	18 March 1996	18 July 1996	
4	Muhammed Farashuddin	11 August 1996	10 August 1998	
5	Wahiduddin Mahmud	11 August 1998	14 November 2009	
6	Qazi Kholiquzzaman Ahmad	15 November 2009	13 September 2023	
7	M Khairul Hossain	14 September 2023	12 August 2024	
8	Zakir Ahmed Khan	28 August 2024	Till date	
