= Anti-Corruption Commission (Bangladesh) =

Government-linked anti-corruption agency of Bangladesh

Anti-Corruption Commission দুর্নীতি দমন কমিশন
- Crest of Anti-Corruption Commission

- Flag of Anti-Corruption Commission
- Abbreviation: ACC; দুদক

Agency overview
- Formed: 21 November 2004

Jurisdictional structure
- National agency: Bangladesh
- Operations jurisdiction: Bangladesh
- Constituting instrument: Anti-Corruption Commission Act, 2004
- Specialist jurisdiction: Anti-corruption

Operational structure
- Headquarters: 1, Segunbagicha, Dhaka 1000
- Agency executive: A. K. M. Asaduzzaman, Chairman

Website
- acc.org.bd

The Anti-Corruption Commission (Bengali: দুর্নীতি দমন কমিশন; often abbreviated: ACC, Bengali: দুদক) is the principal government agency against corruption in Bangladesh.

== History ==
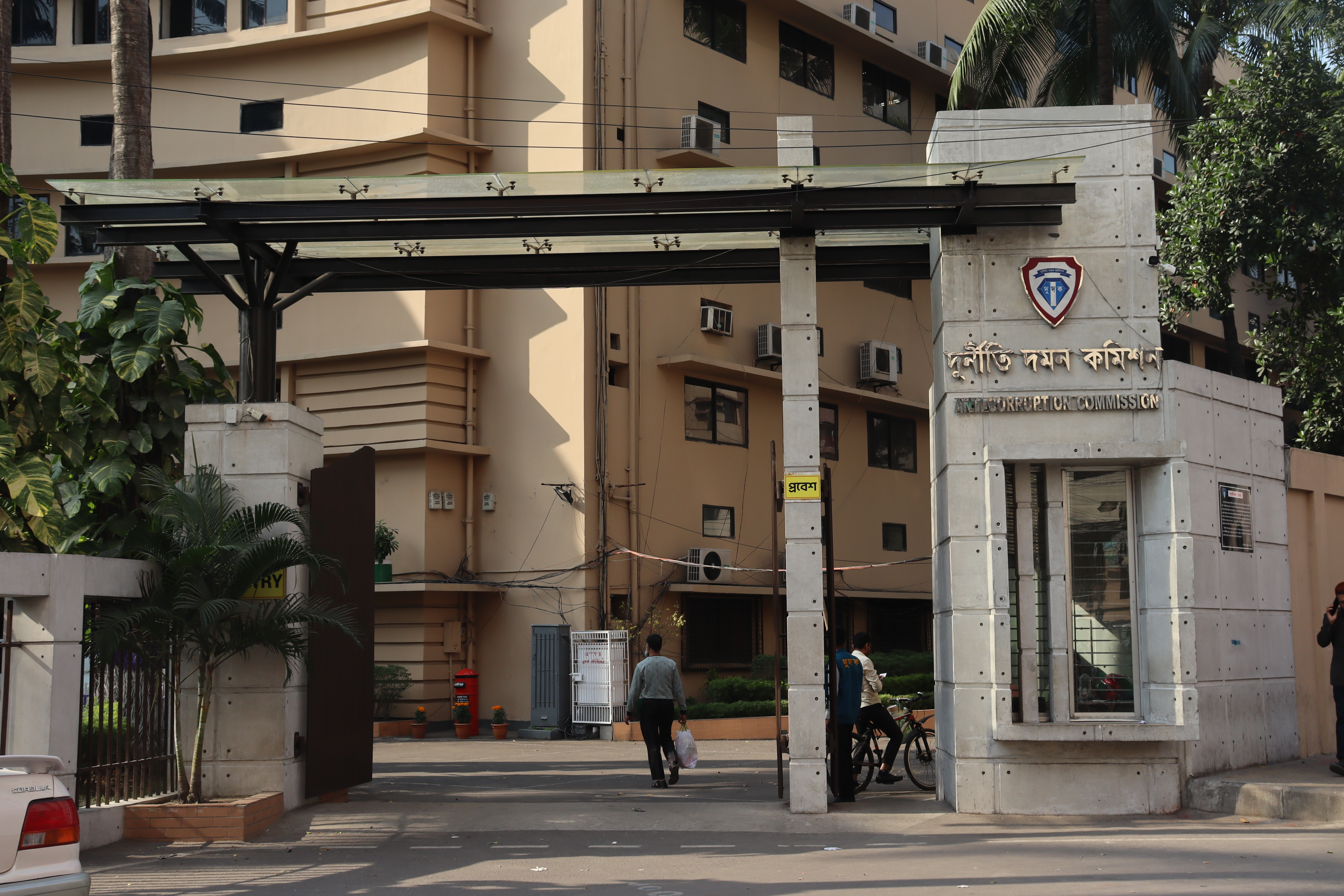
Anti-Corruption Commission, HQ Segun Bagicha

The Anti-Corruption Commission was formed through an act promulgated on 23 February 2004 that came into force on 9 May 2004. Although initially, it could not make the desired impact, immediately following its reconstitution in February 2007, the ACC began working with renewed vigor and impetus duly acceding to the United Nations Convention against corruption that was adopted by the General Assembly away back on 31 October 2003. Its framework and function are governed by Anti-Corruption Commission Act, 2004.

In 2009, Ghulam Rahman was appointed chairman of the commission, replacing Hasan Mashhud Chowdhury.

The Anti-Corruption Commission was formed through an act in 2004, but is considered to be largely ineffective in investigating and preventing corruption because of governmental involvement and influence over it. The Anti-Corruption Commission of Bangladesh is crippled by the 2013 amendment of the Anti-Corruption Commission Act introduced by the ruling Awami League government, which makes it necessary for the commission to obtain permission from the government to investigate or file any charge against government bureaucrats or politicians. The commission is often criticised for being ineffective and a wastage of resources due to the influence of the government over it.

In June 2013, the government appointed M Badiuzzaman chairman of Anti-Corruption Commission replacing Ghulam Rahman and Nasiruddin Ahmed was appointed commissioner.

In 2015, the ACC investigated the case of Padma Bridge Scandal. Even though the World Bank continuously pushed the government to take action against the perpetrators, after 53 days of investigation, ACC found nobody to be guilty. On the basis of ACC's report, Dhaka district judge court acquitted all the seven government officials who were believed to be involved in the corruption plot. Before that, ACC even exonerated Syed Abul Hossain and ex-state minister for foreign affairs Abul Hasan Chowdhury from the allegation of involvement in the corruption conspiracy.

In May 2016, Iqbal Mahmood was made chairman of the Anti-Corruption Commission replacing M Bodiuzzaman, and A F M Aminul Islam was appointed commissioner replacing Mohammed Shahabuddin Chuppu.

Deputy Inspector General Mizanur Rahman tried to pay 4 million taka to an investigator of Anti-Corruption Commission, Director Khandaker Enamul Basir, to stop a corruption investigation against him. Rahman was convicted of trying to bribe Basir and was sentenced to three years imprisonment; and Basir was sentenced to eight years imprisonment in the corruption case.

After the Students–People's uprising in 2024 and the Yunus interim government assumed power on 8 August, ACC has filed cases against former ministers and Awami League affiliates for money laundering and corruption, and launched various operations against irregularities in parts of the country.

== Organization ==
The commission has formulated some forms of corruption in Bangladesh, for everyone to know, understand and prepare to completely erase corruption, if not reduce it.

- Bribery: It is the offering of money, services, or other valuables to persuade someone to do something in return. Synonyms: kickbacks, baksheesh (tips), payola, hush money, sweetener, protection money, boodle, and gratuity.
- Embezzlement: Taking of money, property, or other valuables by the person to whom it has been entrusted for personal benefit.
- Extortion: Demanding or taking of money, property, or other valuables through the use of coercion and/or force. A typical example of extortion would be when armed police or military men exact money for passage through a roadblock. Synonyms include blackmail, bloodsucking, and extraction.
- Abuse of discretion: The abuse of office for private gain, but without external inducement or extortion. Patterns of such abuses are usually associated with bureaucracies in which broad individual discretion is created, few oversights or accountability structures are present, as well as those in which decision-making rules are so complex as to neutralize the effectiveness of such structures even if they exist.
- Improper political contributions: Payments made in an attempt to unduly influence present or future activities by a party or its members when they are in office.

The Anti-Corruption Commission established district committees all over Bangladesh with each having 10 members.

== Notable cases ==
- The Commission filed cases against former Prime Minister Khaleda Zia regarding graft at the Zia Charitable Trust and Zia Orphanage Trust.
- The Commission filed cases against former Prime Minister Sheikh Hasina and eight others on 7 May 2008 for awarding a gas exploration and extraction deal to Niko Resources through corruption and abuse of power.
- In June 2022, the Anti-Corruption Commission (ACC) filed a graft case against 21 individuals linked to One Spinning Mills Ltd. for embezzling Tk 32.67 crore from Sonali Bank via loan irregularities. The accused included One Spinning Mills' director AHM Jahangir and managing director Giasuddin Al Mamun, who is a close business associate of BNP Acting Chairman Tarique Rahman.

== List of chairmen ==
The chairmen of the Anti-Corruption Commission are as follows:

- Sultan Hossain Khan (23 February 2004 – 8 February 2007)
- Hasan Mashhud Chowdhury (22 February 2007 – 2 April 2009) (With the status of Full Minister)
- Ghulam Rahman (1 May 2009 – 23 June 2013)
- M Badiuzzaman (24 June 2013 – 6 March 2016)
- Iqbal Mahmood (14 March 2016 – 9 March 2021)
- Mohammad Moinuddin Abdullah (10 March 2021 – 29 October 2024)
- Mohammad Abdul Momen (12 December 2024 – 3 March 2026)
- A. K. M. Asaduzzaman (17 August 2026 - present)
