= Dhaka Stock Exchange =

Stock exchange in Bangladesh

- ঢাকা স্টক এক্সচেঞ্জ
- Official logo of DSE
- Type: Stock Exchange
- Location: Dhaka, Bangladesh
- Coordinates: 23.8360°N 90.4173°E
- Founded: 1954; 72 years ago
- Owner: Dhaka Stock Exchange Limited
- Key people: Mominul Islam (Chairman); Nuzhat Anwar (Managing Director)
- Currency: Bangladeshi taka (৳)
- No. of listings: 636 (August 2026) (Note: 636 total listed securities, including 360 company stocks, 35 mutual funds, 217 government bonds, 8 debentures and 16 corporate bonds.)
- Market cap: ৳6.84 trillion (US$56 billion) (October 2026) (Note: Dhaka Stock Exchange calculates the total market capitalization by aggregating the total market value of all listed stocks, treasury bonds, corporate bonds, and mutual funds.)
- Indices: DSE 30 Index; DSEX Index; DSES Index
- Website: www.dse.com.bd old.dsebd.org (Old Site)

The Dhaka Stock Exchange (DSE; Bengali: ঢাকা স্টক এক্সচেঞ্জ Dhaka stôk ekschenj), located besides of Hotel Le Meridian in Nikunja 2, Dhaka, is one of the two stock exchanges of Bangladesh, the other being the Chittagong Stock Exchange.

== History ==
It was first incorporated as East Pakistan Stock Exchange Association Ltd on 28 April 1954 and started formal trading in 1956. It was renamed as East Pakistan Stock Exchange Ltd on 23 June 1962. It was again renamed as Dacca Stock Exchange Ltd on 13 May 1964. After 1971 the trading was discontinued for five years. In 1976 trading restarted in Bangladesh, and DSE was started on 16 September 1986. The formula for calculating DSE all share price index was changed according to IFC on 1 November 1993. Automated trading was initiated on 10 August 1998 and started on 1 January 2001. A central securities depository system was initiated on 24 January 2004.

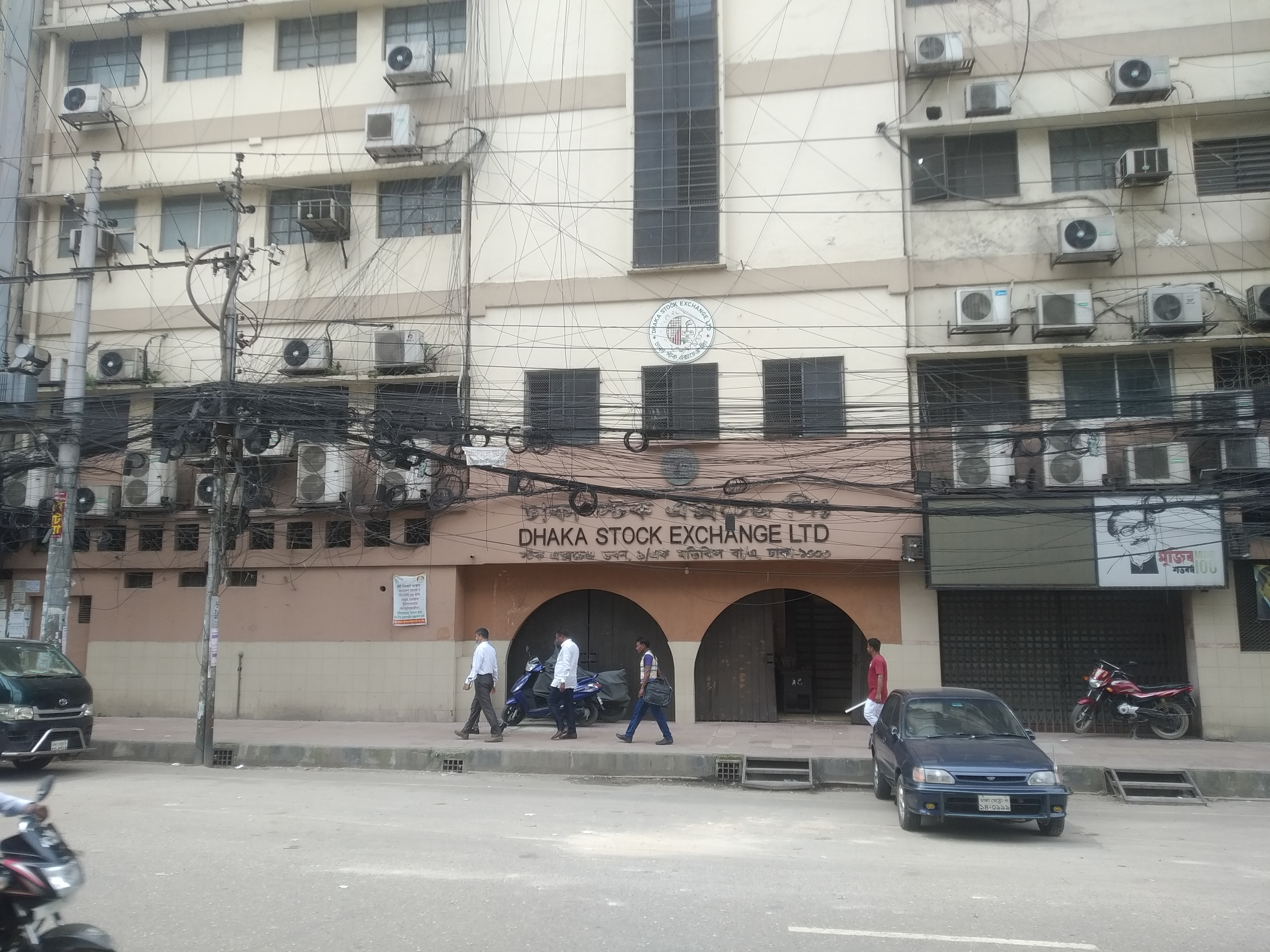
Old Building of Dhaka Stock Exchange

As of 16 November 2009, the benchmark index of the Dhaka Stock Exchange (DSE) crossed 4000 points for the first time, setting a new high at 4148 points. In 2010, the index crossed 8500 points and finally crashed in the first quarter of 2011. Millions of investors lost their money and came out onto the street, blaming the speculators and regulators for the bubble that finally burst in what became known as the 2011 Bangladesh share market scam. Currently, there are 22 industrial sectors in DSE which accommodate 625 listed companies. In January 2023, DSE and Nasdaq announced their partnership with trading technology. However, no new companies were approved for IPOs in 2024, underscoring the market's paralysis. Well-performing family-owned businesses are reluctant to list, fearing regulatory scrutiny and governance reforms that threaten their traditional control. As a result, Bangladesh’s market capitalization has stagnated at around 20% of GDP.

== Formation ==
Dhaka Stock Exchange (DSE) is a public limited company. It is formed and managed under Company Act 1994, Security and Exchange Commission Act 1993, Security and Exchange Commission Regulation 1994, and Security Exchange (Inside Trading) regulation 1994. The issued capital of this company is Tk. 500,000, which is divided up to 250 shares each pricing Tk. 2000. No individual or firm can buy more than one share. According to the stock market rule, only members can participate on the floor and buy shares for themselves or their clients. At present, it has 238 members. The market capitalization of the Dhaka Stock Exchange reached nearly $9 billion in September 2007 and $27.4 billion on 9 December 2009.

== Management ==
The management and operation of Dhaka Stock Exchange is entrusted to a 25 members board of directors. Among them, 12 are elected from DSE members, another 12 are selected from different trade bodies and relevant organisations. The CEO is the 25th ex officio member of the board. The government has appointed Khondoker Rashed Maqsood, who teaches banking and insurance at Dhaka University, as the chairman of Bangladesh Securities and Exchange Commission, reports bdnews24.com.

The following organisations are currently holding positions in DSE Board:

- Bangladesh Bank
- ICB – Investment Corporation of Bangladesh
- President of Institute of Chartered Accountants of Bangladesh
- President of Federation of Bangladesh Chambers of Commerce and Industries (FBCCI)
- President of Metropolitan Chamber of Commerce and Industry, Dhaka and Industries
- Professor of Finance Department of Dhaka University
- President of Dhaka Chamber of Commerce & Industry (DCCI).

== Trading hours ==
The Dhaka Stock Exchange is open for trading Sunday through Thursday between 10:00 am – 2:30 pm BST, except for holidays declared by the exchange in advance. In the month of Ramadan, the exchange is open for trading between 10:00 am – 2:00 pm BST.

There are a total of 651 Securities and 397 companies listed on this Stock exchange. The listing provides an exclusive privilege to securities in the stock exchange. Only listed shares are quoted on the stock exchange. A stock exchange facilitates transparency in transactions of listed securities in perfect equality and competitive conditions. Listing is beneficial to the company, to the investor, and to the public at large.

The trading indices are DSE Broad Index (DSEX), DSE Shariah Index (DSES), DSE 30 Index (DS30), CDSET.

== 2010–11 crash ==
The bullish market turned bearish during November 2010, with the exchange losing 1,800 points between December 2010 and January 2011. Millions of investors have been rendered bankrupt as a result of the market crash. The crash is believed to be caused artificially to benefit a handful of players at the expense of the big players.

== List of chairpersons ==
Sn.	Name	Term Starts	Term Ends	References
1	Ahmad Fazlur Rahman	1972	1975	Past Chairmans of Dhaka Stock Exchange".
2	Khurshid Alam	27 February 1976	6 August 1979	Past Chairmans of Dhaka Stock Exchange".
3	Nur-E-Alam Siddique	6 August 1979	6 November 1980	Past Chairmans of Dhaka Stock Exchange".
4	Khwaja Abdul Quddus	6 November 1980	18 March 1981	Past Chairmans of Dhaka Stock Exchange".
5	Nur-E-Alam Siddique	18 March 1981	22 December 1981	Past Chairmans of Dhaka Stock Exchange".
6	Khwaja Abdul Quddus	22 December 1981	24 March 1983	Past Chairmans of Dhaka Stock Exchange".
7	Khurshid Alam	24 March 1983	18 December 1985	Past Chairmans of Dhaka Stock Exchange".
8	Hemayet Uddin Ahmed	18 December 1985	6 January 1987	Past Chairmans of Dhaka Stock Exchange".
9	Kazi Firoz Rashid	6 January 1987	23 March 1990	Past Chairmans of Dhaka Stock Exchange".
10	Khwaja Abdul Quddus	23 March 1990	20 Jun 1991	Past Chairmans of Dhaka Stock Exchange".
11	Aminul Islam Khan	20 Jun 1991	7 October 1993	Past Chairmans of Dhaka Stock Exchange".
12	Khurshid Alam	7 October 1993	6 December 1995	Past Chairmans of Dhaka Stock Exchange".
13	Imtiyaz Husain	6 December 1995	11 May 1997	Past Chairmans of Dhaka Stock Exchange".
14	M. A Huq Howlader	11 May 1997	24 December 1997	Past Chairmans of Dhaka Stock Exchange".
15	Md. Rakibur Rahman	24 December 1997	30 March 2000	Past Chairmans of Dhaka Stock Exchange".
16	Md. Shahiq Khan	30 March 2000	28 March 2002	Past Chairmans of Dhaka Stock Exchange".
17	Ahmed Iqbal Hasan	28 March 2002	28 December 2003	Past Chairmans of Dhaka Stock Exchange".
18	Md. Shahiq Khan	17 February 2005	7 February 2006	Past Chairmans of Dhaka Stock Exchange".
19	Md. Abdullah Bokhari	7 February 2006	15 May 2008	Past Chairmans of Dhaka Stock Exchange".
20	Abdul Haque	15 May 2008	28 February 2009	Past Chairmans of Dhaka Stock Exchange".
21	Md. Rakibur Rahman	28 February 2009	27 March 2010	Past Chairmans of Dhaka Stock Exchange".
22	Md. Shakil Rizvi	27 March 2010	15 March 2012	Past Chairmans of Dhaka Stock Exchange".
23	Md. Rakibur Rahman	15 March 2012	15 Jun 2013	Past Chairmans of Dhaka Stock Exchange".
24	Ahasanul Islam	15 June 2013	13 February 2014	Past Chairmans of Dhaka Stock Exchange".
25	Justice Siddiqur Rahman Miah	14 February 2014	13 February 2017	Past Chairmans of Dhaka Stock Exchange".
26	Abul Hashem	14 February 2017	12 February 2020	Past Chairmans of Dhaka Stock Exchange".
27	Md. Eunusur Rahman	24 February 2020	18 February 2023	Past Chairmans of Dhaka Stock Exchange".
28	Hafiz Md. Hasan Babu	5 March 2023	August 18, 2024	Past Chairmans of Dhaka Stock Exchange".
29	Mominul Islam	October 3, 2024	Present	

== See also ==
- List of South Asian stock exchanges
