= Bangladesh Ansar =

Paramilitary force of Bangladesh

Bangladesh Ansar বাংলাদেশ আনসার
- Insignia of Bangladesh Ansar and Village Defence Party

- Flag of Bangladesh Ansar and Village Defence Party
- Common name: Ansar Bahini
- Motto: শান্তি শৃঙ্খলা উন্নয়ন নিরাপত্তায় সর্বত্র আমরা We are everywhere in peace, order, development and security

Agency overview
- Formed: 12 February 1948
- Preceding agency: East Pakistan Ansars (1948–1972)
- Employees: 6.4 million
- Annual budget: ৳2185 crore (US$180 million) 2026-2027

Jurisdictional structure
- National agency: Bangladesh
- Operations jurisdiction: Bangladesh
- Governing body: Government of Bangladesh
- General nature: Gendarmerie
- Specialist jurisdictions: Paramilitary law enforcement, counter insurgency, riot control; Protection of international or domestic VIPs, protection of significant state assets

Operational structure
- Headquarters: Khilgaon, Dhaka, Bangladesh
- Minister responsible: Salahuddin Ahmed, Minister of Home Affairs
- Agency executives: Major General Towhidul Ahmed, Director General; Brigadier General Md Nazim Uddin, BAM, Additional Director General
- Parent agency: Ministry of Home Affairs
- Functions: 6: Anti Smuggling Operations; Enforcement Operations; Border Protection; Village Protection; Disaster Management; Airport Security

Facilities
- Battalions: 42

Notables
- Significant Battles: 1950 East Pakistan riots; Indo-Pakistani War of 1965; Bangladesh War of Independence; Indo-Pakistani War of 1971; Chittagong Hill Tracts conflict; 1994 Bangladesh Ansar mutiny; Internal conflict in Myanmar; 2015 Bangladesh–Arakan Army border clash; 2024 Bangladesh Ansar protest
- Anniversary: 12 February
- Award: 1. Bir Sreshtho; 2. Bir Uttom; 3. Bir Bikrom; 4. Bir Protik

Website
- ansarvdp.gov.bd
- Service uniform: Rich Olive; Combat uniform: Ansar Battalion: Olive, Dark Blue, Earth yellow, Black; Ansar: Olive, Black; VDP: Maroon, Black

The Bangladesh Ansar and Village Defence Party (Bengali: বাংলাদেশ আনসার ও গ্রাম প্রতিরক্ষা দল, romanized: Bānlādeś Ānsār ō Grām Pratirakkhā Dal) is an auxiliary paramilitary force under the Ministry of Home Affairs with administrative and operational supervision by army officials. Established in 1948, the Ansar–VDP is the largest paramilitary force in the world and supports the Bangladesh Police and other law enforcement agencies in maintaining internal security, rural protection, and community policing. It also plays a vital role in disaster response and community development programs across Bangladesh.

== History ==
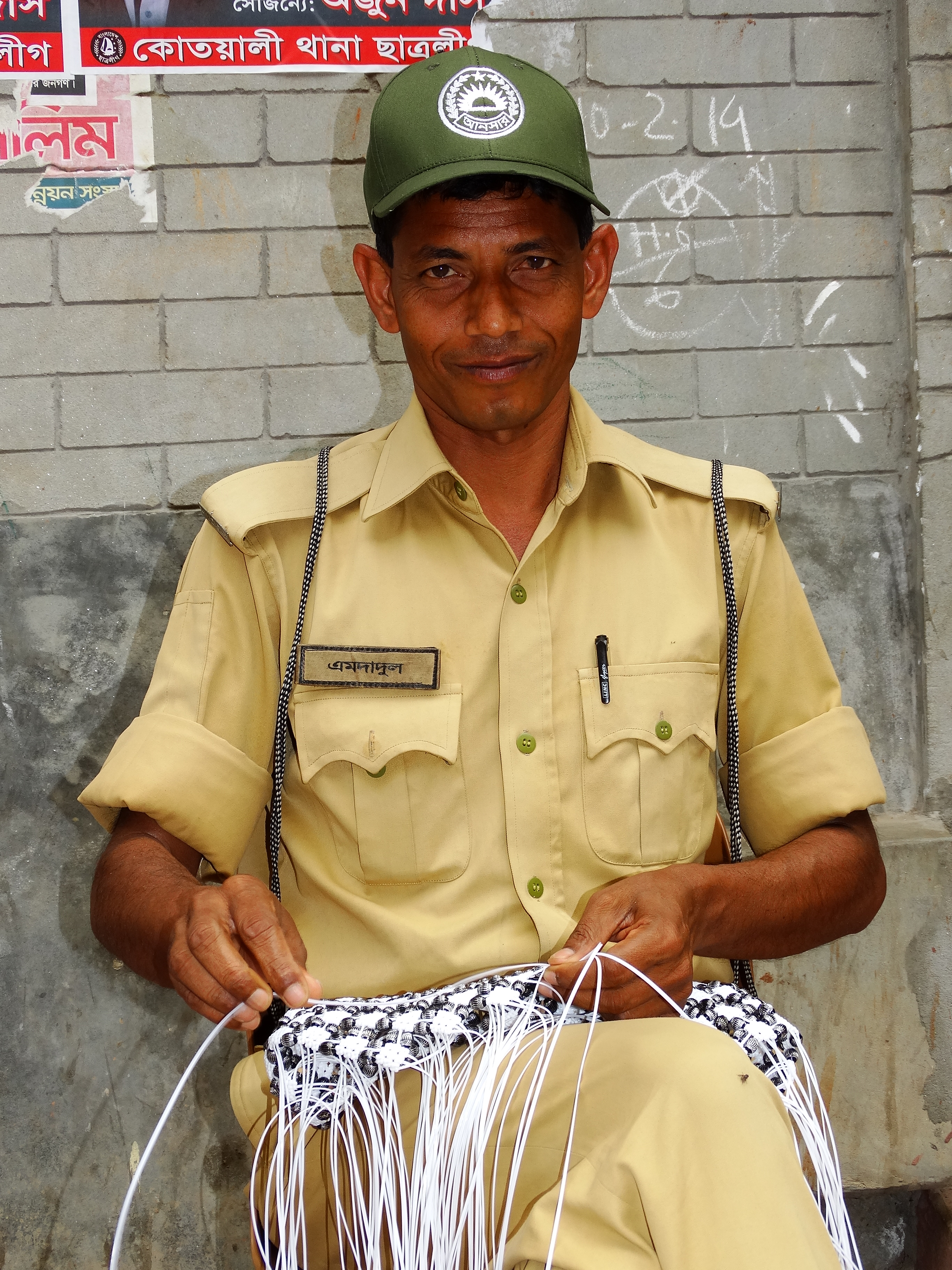
Ansar member weaving on duty.

The name originates from the Arabic word of "Ansar" which denotes a "volunteer". The Ansar were the local inhabitants of Medina who, in Islamic tradition, took the Islamic prophet Muhammad and his followers (the Muhajirun) into their homes when they emigrated from Mecca during the hijra.

=== Pakistan era ===
The Ansar Force was formed as the "East Bengal Ansars" by the East Bengal Ansars Act of 1948, and officially launched on 12 February 1948. The first director of the Ansar was James Buchanan, a British official appointed by the government of then-Chief Minister of East Bengal Khawaja Nazimuddin. The force was placed under the administration of the home ministry of the province of East Bengal (later known as East Pakistan). The force was rechristened to East Pakistan Ansars on 1957.

The emphasis was on recruiting in border areas, where Ansars were deployed to interdict smuggling and prevent emigrants from taking valuables out of the country illegally. The force grew quickly. By early 1949, there were 118,000 Ansars. During the Indo-Pakistani war of 1965, the then East Pakistan Ansar was deployed to the border along with the East Pakistan Rifles to support the Pakistan Army in defending the border. During the 1950 East Pakistan riots, several cases of communal violence were committed by the East Pakistan Ansars against minorities.

==== Involvement in the Bangladesh War of Independence ====
During the Bangladesh Independence War of 1971, 40,000 Ansars joined the Bangladesh Forces and joined the guerrillas and assisted the Bengali members of the East Pakistan Police to fight against the Pakistan Army. 12 Ansar members presented a guard of honour to the Bangladesh government in exile at 8 Theatre road on 17 April 1971. As a result, the Ansar were disbanded by the government of Pakistan. A new paramilitary force was then established, the now infamous Razakar militia.

=== Post-independence ===
After the independence of Bangladesh, the force was reconstituted as the Bangladesh Ansar. The Ansar were given fresh importance by the government of President Ziaur Rahman, which designated the Ansar as the "people's defence force" and formed Ansar battalions.

==== Raising of Ansar battalions ====
In 1976, 20 Ansar battalions were raised in line with the Armed Police Battalion to augment the strength of the security forces. At present, there are 38 male and 2 female Ansar battalions deployed all over the country. Battalion Ansars are mainly deployed in Chittagong Hill Tracts (CHTs) for Counter Insurgency Operations (CIO), especially Operation Uttaran and south-western region of the country for Counter Terrorism Operations.

==== Village Defence Parties ====
The Village Defence Party (VDP) was formed in 1976 and the Urban Defence Party (TDP) was formed in 1980.

==== 1994 mutiny and reforms ====
In 1994, a mutiny against low pay and unfair treatment was suppressed by the Bangladesh Rifles. This prompted a series of reforms by successive governments including the Ansar Bahini Act (1995), Battalion Ansar Act (1995) and the Village Defence Party Act (1995). Under these Acts, the Ansar Bahini and the Battalion Ansars were declared as a "Disciplined Force" in accordance with article 152 of the Constitution. The government also set up "Ansar VDP Unnayan Bank" where the members of Ansar-VDP members were entitled to loans and shares.

In 1998, Bangladesh Ansar and VDP were awarded the National Standard, and in 2004, it was awarded the Independence Award. The service of battalion Ansars was under National Pay Scale in October 2008, and they were entitled to family rations and combat uniform. In 2006, the role of Ansar-VDP was expanded to fight rising militancy. In 2016, the Ansar Striking Force, a 300 strong elite unit, was created to provide security to diplomats.

==== 2024 Secretariat clash ====
Following the fall of Hasina government, a faction of Ansar members began protesting, demanding the nationalisation of their jobs and the abolition of the six-month "Rest System," among other benefits. Their demonstrations caused severe traffic congestion across the capital, leading to significant public inconvenience.

On 25 August, the Home Affairs Advisor, Retired Lt. Gen. Jahangir Alam Chowdhury, met with the protesting Ansar members. He announced a preliminary decision to abolish the controversial six-month "Rest System" and assured that the demand for nationalisation would be reviewed based on an upcoming committee report.

Tensions escalated when Ansar members reportedly trapped two coordinators of the Anti-discrimination Students Movement, Hasnat Abdullah and Sarjis Alam, along with other officials, including Information and Communications Technology adviser Nahid Islam, inside the Secretariat.

Earlier that day, Hasnat Abdullah had accused the Ansar members of holding them captive and called for support on social media. The situation worsened when Ansar members forced their way into the Secretariat, chanting slogans and demanding that their demands be met.

Around 9 PM, a group of students marched from Dhaka University TSC to the Secretariat to rescue them but were met with a barrage of bricks and stones from the Ansar members, resulting in numerous injuries on both sides, including Hasnat Abdullah.

== Role ==
The stated missions of Ansar are:

- To assist government or any authority under government in matters of public security
- To take part in any public welfare activities according to the government's instructions to improve socio-economic conditions of the country
- To assist law enforcement agencies in metropolitan and industrial security
- To assist the Bangladesh Armed Forces in national defense during war
- To provide security to national VIPs, CIPs and diplomats according to the government's instructions
- To take part in any management after disasters according to the government's instructions

The members of Ansar also participate in education expansion programs, tree plantation, population control, women's empowerment, and sanitation activities.

== Rank structure ==
Commissioned officers

Rank group	General/Flag Officers		Senior Officers				Junior Officers
Bangladesh Ansar
Bangladesh Ansar	Director General	Additional Director General	Deputy Director General (Range Commander)	Director (Range Director)	Senior Deputy Director (District Commandant/Commanding Officer)	Deputy Director	Assistant Director (Above 4 years of service) (Assistant District Commandant/Second-In-Command)	Assistant Director (Assistant District Commandant/Second-In-Command)
Grade	1	2	3	4	5	6	7	9 (8)

Subordinate officers

Rank group	Junior Commissioned Officers			Non-Commissioned Officers	Enlisted
Bangladesh Ansar
Bangladesh Ansar	Circle Adjutant (Sub-district Ansar & Village Defence Party Officer/Company Commander)	Assistant Circle Adjutant (Sub-district Instructor/Platoon Commander)	Assistant Platoon Commander	Havildar	Naik	Lance Naik	Battalion Ansar
Grade	9 & 10	10 & 11	11	12	13 & 14	15	17

== Organization ==
At present, there are three branches of Ansar: the General Ansar, the Battalion Ansar, and the Village Defence Party (VDP). Their combined draw is over 6 million, which is the largest force in the world as a paramilitary or single force.

The Ansar is headed by a Director General of Lt Gen status, who also heads the Village Defence Party (VDP).

== Organizational Structure ==
The Bangladesh Ansar is made up of numerous departments and units including:

- Director-General
  - Deputy Director (Coordination)
  - Additional Director-General
    - Headquarters
      - Administration Directorate
        - Executive Engineer Construction Branch
        - Sub-Judge (Law officer) Legal Cell
        - Administration Branch
        - Record Branch
          - Documentation Division
        - Administration Wing Branch
        - Q-Branch
          - Provision Branch
            - Store Branch
              - Store Ansar Division
              - Store VDP Division
        - Finance Branch
          - VDP Budget & Accounts Branch
          - TDP Budget & Accounts Branch
          - Ansar Budget & Accounts Branch
            - Regimental Accounts Division
        - Medical Branch
      - Operation Directorate
        - Editor Cun Administrator Protirodh
        - CHT Operations Branch
        - Operations Branch
          - Ansar General Branch
          - Village Defence Party
          - Town Defence Party
          - Monitoring (Intelligence) Branch
          - Communication Branch
          - Regimental Police
          - Information and Communication Technology (ICT) Branch
        - Embodiment Branch
          - Battalion Ansar Wing
          - Key Point Installation (KPI) Wing
          - Establishment Wing
          - Ansar Guard Battalion
      - Training Directorate
        - Ansar Training Branch
        - VDP Training Branch
        - TDP Training Branch
        - Project Training Branch
        - Sports & Cultural Branch
        - Public Relations Branch
    - Field Establishment
      - Ansar Training School
        - Administration
        - Medical Leave Room
        - Weapon Training Wing
          - Weapon Training Branch
            - Instructor Training Branch
            - Officer Training Branch
            - Refresher Training Branch
            - Battalion Training Branch
        - Development Wing
          - Motivation & Sannirvar Branch
          - Family Planning Branch
          - Agriculture & Horticulture Branch
          - Sports & Recreation Branch
          - Pisci-Culture Branch
          - Cottage Industries
      - Vocational Training Centre Kolakopa
        - Cottage Industry on Job Training Branch
        - Weapon Training Branch
      - Vocational Training Centre Gazipur
        - Cottage Industry on Job Training Branch
        - Sewing & Knitting Branch
      - Ansar-VDP Hospital
      - Dhaka Range Branch
      - Chittagong Range Branch
      - Cumilla Range Branch
      - Rajshahi Range Branch
      - Khulna Range Branch
      - Barishal Range Branch
      - Sylhet Range Branch
      - Rangpur Range Branch
      - Mymensingh Range Branch

=== Director-General ===
Director General of Bangladesh Ansar, also known as Ansar and VDP Chief, is the professional head of the Bangladesh Ansar. The current DG is Major General Abdul Motaleb Sazzad Mahmud.

The Director General functions from the Bangladesh Ansar Headquarters, which is located in the Khilgaon, Dhaka.

=== Headquarters ===
The headquarters of the Ansar is located in Khilgaon, Dhaka and the training facilities are located at the Bangladesh Ansar & VDP Academy in Shafipur, Gazipur, north of the national capital, Dhaka.

== Equipment ==
Name	Image	Caliber	Type	Origin	Notes
Escort MP-PG		12-gauge	Pump action shotgun	Turkey	14,100
Benelli Supernova		12-gauge	Pump action shotgun	Italy	1,800
Unknown model		12-gauge	Semi-automatic shotgun	United Kingdom	14,100

== See also ==
- Border Guard Bangladesh
- Rapid Action Battalion
- Bangladesh Coast Guard
- Bangladesh Police
- Gram Police Bahini
- SWAT (Bangladesh)
- Dhaka Metropolitan Police
