= Bangladesh Securities and Exchange Commission =

Government regulatory body overseeing the stock market

Agency overview
- Formed: 8 June 1993; 33 years ago
- Jurisdiction: Bangladesh
- Headquarters: Dhaka, Bangladesh
- Agency executive: Masud Khan, Chairman
- Website: www.sec.gov.bd

The Bangladesh Securities and Exchange Commission (BSEC) is the regulator of the capital market of Bangladesh, comprising Dhaka Stock Exchange (DSE) and Chittagong Stock Exchange (CSE). The commission is a statutory body and attached to the Ministry of Finance.

== History ==
BSEC was established on 8 June 1993 under the Securities and Exchange Commission Act, 1993. Sultan-uz Zaman Khan, a career bureaucrat, was the first commissioner of the commission. Before the commission, the market were regulated under the Capital Issues Act 1947. The chairman and members of the commission are appointed by the government and have overall responsibility to administer securities legislation. The commission, at present, has four full-time members, excluding the chairman. The commission is a statutory body and attached to the Ministry of Finance. It works closely with Central Depository Bangladesh Limited.

From 2006 to 2009, Faruq Ahmad Siddiqi was the chairman of Bangladesh Securities and Exchange Commission during the Fakhruddin Ahmed led Caretaker government.

Initially, the name was Securities and Exchange Commission, on 10 December 2012 and was officially changed to Bangladesh Securities and Exchange Commission.

During the 2011 Bangladesh share market scam, BSEC withdrew various directives given earlier to help stabilize trading at the Dhaka Stock Exchange and was criticized by some commentators for its actions during the subsequent crash.

In 2017, BSEC plans to establish an intelligence unit of the commission.

Bangladesh Academy for Securities Market (BASM) was established in July 2019 as the academic unit of Bangladesh Securities and Exchange Commission.

Two professors of the University of Dhaka, Shaikh Shamsuddin Ahmed and Mizanur Rahman, were appointed commissioners of Bangladesh Securities and Exchange Commission on 20 May 2020 for 4 years.

In 2021, Bangladesh Securities and Exchange Commission announced it is investigating Padma Bank following a complaint by Mohiuddin Khan Alamgir, founding chairman of the bank, and letter against him from the bank.

Bangladesh Securities and Exchange Commission approved Bashundhara Group's request to purchase a 25 percent stake in the Chittagong Stock Exchange. Under the Digital Security Act, Bangladesh Securities and Exchange Commission was identified as a critical information infrastructure which restricts the publics access to information from the organisation. The commission ordered Tamha Securities to be liquidated to pay back clients, whose investment was embezzled by the firm. Professor Rumana Islam of the University of Dhaka was appointed the first female commissioner in May 2022 replacing Khondoker Kamaluzzaman.

On 3 September 2024, former faculty member of the University of Dhaka, Farzana Lalarukh, was appointed as the new commissioner for a 4-year term.

== See also ==
- List of financial supervisory authorities by country
