= Government agencies in Bangladesh =

Government branches in Bangladesh
- • Government Seal • National Emblem
- Type: Central government
- Formation: 10 April 1971; 55 years ago
- Current constitution: 1972 Bangladesh Constitution
- Country: Bangladesh
- Seat of government: Dhaka
- Official languages: English; Bengali
- Website: bangladesh.gov.bd

Legislative branch
- Legislature: Jatiya Sangsad
- Presiding officer: Speaker of the Jatiya Sangsad
- Meeting place: Jatiya Sangsad Bhaban

Executive branch
- Head of state: President of Bangladesh
- Head of government: Prime Minister of Bangladesh
- Principal organ: Cabinet
- Meeting place: Bangladesh Secretariat
- Ministries: varies
- Responsible to: Parliament

Judicial branch
- Court: Supreme Court of Bangladesh
- Chief judge: Chief Justice of Bangladesh

The Government agencies in Bangladesh are state controlled organizations that act independently to carry out the policies of the Government of Bangladesh. The Government Ministries are relatively small and merely policy-making organizations, allowed to control agencies by policy decisions. Some of the work of the government is carried out through state enterprises or limited companies.

== Legislative ==
- Jatiya Sangsad
  - Office of the Speaker of the Jatiya Sangsad
  - Sangsad committees
  - Parliament Secretariat
- Sangsad Television
- Sangsad Library

== Judicial branch ==

=== Supreme Court ===
- Supreme Court
  - Appellate Division
  - High Court Division
- Chief Justice
- Attorney General

=== District Courts ===
Civil Courts

- District Judge Court
- Additional District Judge Court
- Joint District Judge Court
- Senior Assistant Judge Court
- Assistant Judge Court

Criminal Courts

- Session Judge Court
  - District Judge Court
    - District Session Judge Court
    - Additional District Session Judge Court
    - Joint District Session Judge Court
- Magistrate Court
  - District Magistrate Court
    - Chief Judicial Magistrate Court
    - Additional Chief Judicial Magistrate Court
    - Senior Judicial Magistrate Court
    - Judicial Magistrate Court

=== Metropolitan Courts ===
Criminal Courts

  - Metropolitan Judge Court
    - Metropolitan Session Judge Court
    - Additional Metropolitan Session Judge Court
    - Joint Metropolitan Session Judge Court
  - Metropolitan Magistrate Court
    - Chief Metropolitan Magistrate Court
    - Additional Chief Metropolitan Magistrate Court

=== Specialized Courts and Tribunals ===
- Constitutional Court
  - None
- Administrative Court
  - Administrative Tribunals
- Finance Court
  - Money Loan Courts
  - Insolvency Courts
  - Income Tax Appellate Tribunals
  - Special Tribunal for Share Market Scam
- Labour Court
  - Labour Courts
- Court of Justice
  - International Crimes Tribunal
- Social Court
  - Druto Bichar Tribunal
  - Bangladesh Cyber Tribunal

== Executive branch of the government ==
- Anti-Corruption Commission
- Comptroller and Auditor General of Bangladesh
- Bangladesh Planning Commission
- Bangladesh Election Commission
- Bangladesh Public Service Commission
- National Human Rights Commission of Bangladesh

=== President's office ===

- Public Division
- Personal Division
- Toshakhana

=== Prime Minister's Office ===

- Cabinet Division
- Armed Forces Division
  - Bangladesh Navy
  - Bangladesh Air Force
  - Bangladesh Army
- Offices and agencies
  - National Economic Council
  - Invest Bangladesh
  - Bangladesh Export Processing Zone Authority (BEPZA)
  - Bangladesh Economic Zones Authority (BEZA)
  - Privatization Commission, Bangladesh
  - Public-Private Partnership Authority (PPPA)
  - Governance Innovation Unit (GIU)
  - National Security Intelligence (NSI)
  - National Skills Development Authority (NSDA)
  - NGO Affairs Bureau
  - Special Security Force
  - Sub-regional Co-operation Cell (SRCC)
  - Private Export Processing Zone (PEPZ)
- Project
  - Ashrayan Project (Human Resource Development)
  - Access to Information (A2I) Programme (ICT Services)
  - Development Assistance for Special Area (except CHT)

=== Chief Adviser's Office ===

- Cabinet Division
- Armed Forces Division
  - Bangladesh Navy
  - Bangladesh Air Force
  - Bangladesh Army
- Offices and agencies
  - National Economic Council
  - Invest Bangladesh Authority (IBA)
  - Bangladesh Export Processing Zone Authority (BEPZA)
  - Bangladesh Economic Zones Authority (BEZA)
  - Privatization Commission, Bangladesh
  - Public-Private Partnership Authority (PPPA)
  - Governance Innovation Unit (GIU)
  - National Security Intelligence (NSI)
  - National Skills Development Authority (NSDA)
  - NGO Affairs Bureau
  - Special Security Force
  - Sub-regional Co-operation Cell (SRCC)
  - Private Export Processing Zone (PEPZ)
- Project
  - Ashrayan Project (Human Resource Development)
  - Access to Information (A2I) Programme (ICT Services)
  - Development Assistance for Special Area (except CHT)

=== Ministry of Chittagong Hill Tracts Affairs ===
- Chittagong Hill Tracts Development Board
- Refugee Rehabilitation Task Force
- Khagrachhari Hill District Council
- Chittagong Hill Tracts Regional Council
- Bandarban Hill District Council
- Rangamati Hill District Council

=== Ministry of Primary and Mass Education ===
- Bureau of Non-Formal Education
- National Academy for Primary Education
- Directorate of Primary Education

=== Ministry of Agriculture ===
- Agencies
  - Agriculture Information Service (AIS)
  - Department of Agricultural Marketing
  - Department of Agricultural Extension
  - National Institute of Biotechnology
  - Cotton Development Board
  - Barind Multipurpose Development Authority
  - Bangladesh Agricultural Research Institute
  - Bangladesh Agricultural Research Council
  - Bangladesh Sugarcane Research Institute
  - Bangladesh Rice Research Institute
  - Bangladesh Institute of Nuclear Agriculture
  - Bangladesh Jute Research Institute (BJRI)
  - Bangladesh Institute of Research and Training on Applied Nutrition
  - Soil Resources Development Institute
  - SAARC Agriculture Centre (SAC)
  - Seed Certification Agency
- Enterprises
  - Bangladesh Agricultural Development Corporation

=== Ministry of Civil Aviation and Tourism ===
- Bangladesh Parjatan Corporation (Tourism Corporation)
- Bangladesh Tourism Board
- Civil Aviation Authority, Bangladesh
- Limited Company
  - Biman Bangladesh Airlines

=== Ministry of Commerce ===
- Bangladesh Competition Commission
- Office of the Registrar of Joint Stock Companies and Firms
- Office of Chief Controller of Imports and Exports
- The Institute of Cost and Management Accountants
- The Institute of Chartered Accountants of Bangladesh
- Directorate of National Consumer Rights Protection
- Trading Corporation of Bangladesh (TCB)
- Bangladesh Tea Board
- Bangladesh Tariff Commission
- Bangladesh Foreign Trade Institute
- Bangladesh Export Promotion Bureau
- Bangladesh Tea Research Institute

=== Ministry of Road Transport and Bridges ===
- Road Transport and Highways Division
  - Dhaka Transport Coordination Authority
  - Bangladesh Road Transport Authority
  - Bangladesh Road Transport Corporation
  - Roads and Highways Department
- Bridges Division
  - Bangladesh Bridge Authority (BBA)

=== Ministry of Cultural Affairs ===
- Department of Archaeology
- Department of Archives and Libraries
- Department of Public Libraries
- Nazrul Institute
- Bangla Academy
- Bangladesh Copyright Office
- Bangladesh National Museum
- Bangladesh Folk Arts and Crafts Foundation

=== Ministry of Defence ===
- Controller General of Defence Finance
- The National Defence College
- Military Engineer Services
- Directorate General of Defence Purchase
- Bangladesh Ordnance Factories
- Bangladesh Meteorological Department
- Survey of Bangladesh
- Bangladesh Space Research and Remote Sensing Organization
- Military Institute of Science & Technology
- Defence Services Command and Staff College
- Office Of The Chief Administrative Officer
- Department of Military Lands and Cantonments

=== Ministry of Food ===
- Directorate General of Food

=== Ministry of Education ===
- Secondary and Higher Education Division
  - International Mother Language Institute
  - Bangladesh Scouts
  - Higher Education Quality Enhancement Project
  - National Computer Training and Research Academy
  - National Curriculum and Textbook Board
  - National Education Management Academy
  - Department of Inspection and Audit
  - Bangladesh National Commission of UNESCO
  - Bangladesh Bureau of Educational Information and Statistics (BANBEIS)
  - University Grants Commission
  - Non-Government Teachers' Registration and Certification Authority
  - Directorate of Secondary and Higher Education
  - Education Engineering Department
  - Prime Minister's Education Assistance Trust
  - Secondary and Higher Secondary Education Board:
    - Dhaka Education Board
    - Chattogram Education Board
    - Sylhet Education Board
    - Cumilla Education Board
    - Dinajpur Education Board
    - Jashore Education Board
    - Rajshahi Education Board
    - Barishal Education Board
    - Mymensigh Education Board
- Technical and Madrasah Education Division
  - Bangladesh Technical Education Board
  - Bangladesh Madrasa Education Board
  - Directorate of Technical Education

=== Ministry of Power, Energy and Mineral Resources ===
- Power Division
  - Agencies
    - Sustainable and Renewable Energy Development Authority (SREDA)
    - Rural Electrification Board
    - Bangladesh Power Development Board
    - Power Cell
  - Limited companies
    - Dhaka Electric Supply Company Limited
    - Dhaka Power Distribution Company Limited
    - Ashuganj Power Station Company Limited.
    - Electricity Generation Company Limited.
    - West Zone Power Distribution Company Limited.
    - Rural Power Company Limited
    - Power Grid Company of Bangladesh
    - Coal Power Generation Company Bangladesh Limited
- Energy and Mineral Resources Division
  - Agencies
    - Geological Survey of Bangladesh
    - Bureau of Mineral Development
    - Bangladesh Energy Regulatory Commission
    - Bangladesh Petroleum Institute
    - Bangladesh Petroleum Corporation
    - Geological Survey of Bangladesh
    - Bangladesh Hydrocarbon Unit
    - Department of Explosives
    - Energy Security Fund
  - Limited companies
    - Bakhrabad Gas Distribution Company Limited
    - Eastern Refinery Limited
    - Sylhet Gas Fields Limited
    - Titas Gas Transmission and Distribution Company
    - Bangladesh Oil, Gas and Mineral Corporation
    - Converting Natural Gas Company Limited
    - Karnaphuli Gas Distribution Company Limited
    - Bangladesh Petroleum Exploration & Production Company Limited
    - Bangladesh Gas Fields Company Limited

=== Ministry of Environment and Forest ===
- Bangladesh Climate Change Trust
- Department of Environment
- Forest Department
- Bangladesh National Herbarium
- Bangladesh Forest Research Institute (BFRI)
- Forestry Science and Technology Institute, Chittagong
- Forestry Science and Technology Institute, Rajshahi
- Forestry Science and Technology Institute, Sylhet
- Forestry Development and Training Centre, Kaptai
- Bangladesh Forest Industries Development Corporation
- Bangladesh Forest College

=== Ministry of Public Administration ===
- Bangladesh Employees Welfare Board (BKKB)
- Bangladesh Public Administration Training Centre (BPATC)
- Bangladesh Public Service Commission
- Bangladesh Civil Service Administration Academy
- BIAM Foundation
- Department of Printing and Publications
- Department of Government Transport
- Bangladesh Government Press
- Government Printing Press
- Bangladesh Forms and Publication Office
- Bangladesh Stationery Office

=== Ministry of Fisheries and Livestock ===
- Department of Livestock
- Bangladesh Fisheries Research Institute
- Department of Livestock Services
- Department of Fisheries
- Bangladesh Livestock Research Institute (BLRI)
- Bangladesh Fisheries Development Corporation
- Marine Fisheries Academy
- Bangladesh Veterinary Council

=== Ministry of Finance ===
- Finance Division
  - Office of the Controller General of Accounts
  - Investment Corporation of Bangladesh
  - The Security Printing Corporation (Bangladesh) Ltd.
  - Financial Management Reform Program
  - Comptroller and Auditor General of Bangladesh
  - Bangladesh House Building Finance Corporation
  - Pay and Services Commission 2013
- Revenue Policy Division
- Revenue Management Division
  - Bangladesh Customs
  - Benapole Custom House
  - Chittagong Custom House
  - Department of National Savings
  - Dhaka Custom House
- Economic Relations Division
  - Infrastructure Development Company Ltd (IDCOL)
- Bank and Financial Institutions Division
  - Agencies
    - Palli Karma-Sahayak Foundation (PKSF)
    - Bangladesh Institute of Bank Management
    - Bangladesh Bank
    - Bangladesh Securities and Exchange Commission
    - Bangladesh Insurance Development and Regulatory Authority
    - Microcredit Regulatory Authority
  - Enterprises
    - Chittagong Stock Exchange
    - Dhaka Stock Exchange
    - Sadharan Bima Corporation
    - Jiban Bima Corporation
  - State Owned Commercial Banks
    - Sonali Bank Limited
    - Agrani Bank Limited
    - Rupali Bank Limited
    - Janata Bank Limited
    - BASIC Bank Limited
    - Bangladesh Development Bank Limited
  - State Owned Specialized Banks
    - Bangladesh Krishi Bank
    - Rajshahi Agricultural Development Bank

=== Ministry of Foreign Affairs ===
- American Institute of Bangladesh Studies
- Permanent Representative of Bangladesh to the United Nations
- Bangladesh Institute of International and Strategic Studies (BIISS)
- Bangladesh Institute of Law and International Affairs
- Foreign Service Academy
- List of diplomatic missions of Bangladesh

=== Ministry of Health and Family Welfare ===
- Health Service Division
  - International Centre for Diarrhoeal Disease Research Bangladesh (ICDDRB)
  - Department of Drug Administration
  - Directorate General of Nursing and Midwifery
  - Directorate General of Health Services
  - Health Economics Unit
  - Department of Public Health Engineering
  - Bangladesh Nursing and Midwifery Council
  - Health Engineering Department
  - Institute of Epidemiology Disease Control And Research
- Medical Education And Family Welfare Division
  - National Population Research and Training Center
  - Directorate General of Family Planning

=== Ministry of Home Affairs ===
- Public Security Division
  - Bangladesh Police
  - Border Guard Bangladesh
  - Bangladesh Coast Guard
  - Bangladesh Ansar and Village Defence Party
  - Metropolitan Police
    - Dhaka Metropolitan Police
    - Chittagong Metropolitan Police
    - Khulna Metropolitan Police
    - Rajshahi Metropolitan Police
    - Barisal Metropolitan Police
    - Sylhet Metropolitan Police
    - Rangpur Metropolitan Police
    - Gazipur Metropolitan Police
- Security Service Division
  - Department of Narcotics Control
  - Department of Immigration & Passport
  - Department of Fire Service & Civil Defence
  - Department of Prison

=== Ministry of Housing and Public Works ===
- Public Works Department
- Department of Architecture
- Housing and Building Research Institute
- Directorate of Government Accommodation
- National Housing Authority
- Urban Development Directorate
- City Development Authorities
  - Capital Development Authority (RAJUK)
  - Chittagong Development Authority (CDA)
  - Khulna Development Authority (KDA)
  - Rajshahi Development Authority (RDA)
  - Cumilla Development Authority (CLDA)
  - Cox's Bazar Development Authority (CXDA)
  - Gazipur Development Authority (GDA)
  - Barishal Development Authority (BDA)
  - Sylhet Development Authority (SDA)
  - Rangpur Development Authority (RPDA)
  - Mymensingh Development Authority (MDA)
  - Narayanganj Development Authority (NDA)

=== Ministry of Industries ===
- Agencies
  - Bangladesh Standards and Testing Institution (BSTI)
  - Bangladesh Industrial and Technical Assistance Center (BITAC)
  - Bangladesh Institute of Management (BIM)
  - Department of Patents, Designs and Trademarks (DPDT)
  - National Productivity Organization (NPO)
  - Office of The Chief Inspector of Boilers
  - Bangladesh Accreditation Board
  - Small and Medium Enterprise Foundation (SMEF)
- Enterprise
  - Bangladesh Chemical Industries Corporation (BCIC)
  - Bangladesh Sugar and Food Industries Corporation (BFSIC)
  - Bangladesh Steel and Engineering Corporation (BSEC)
  - Bangladesh Small and Cottage Industry Corporation (BSCIC)

=== Ministry of Information and Broadcasting ===
- Press Information Department (Information)
  - Press Institute of Bangladesh
  - Bangladesh Sangbad Sanstha
  - Bangladesh Press Council
- Department of Mass Communication (Broadcasting)
  - Bangladesh Betar
  - Bangladesh Television
  - Sangsad TV
- Department of Films and Publications (Films)
  - Bangladesh Film Development Corporation
  - Bangladesh Film Certification Board
  - Bangladesh Film Archive

=== Ministry of Textiles and Jute ===
- Department of Jute
- Bangladesh Handloom Board
- Bangladesh Jute Mills Corporation
- Bangladesh Textile Mills Corporation
- Bangladesh Sericulture Development Board
- Bangladesh Sericulture Research and Training Institute
- Jute Diversification Promotion Center
- Department of Textiles
- Bangladesh Jute Corporation

=== Ministry of Labour and Employment ===
- Department of Inspection for Factories and Establishments
- RMG Sustainability Council
- Child Labour Unit
- Minimum Wage Board
- Department of Labour
- Labour Appellate Tribunal
- Central Fund
- National Child Labour Welfare Council

=== Ministry of Law, Justice and Parliamentary Affairs ===
- Law and Justice Division
  - Bangladesh Supreme Court
  - Bangladesh Law Commission
  - Bangladesh Judicial Service Commission
  - National Legal Aid Services Organization
  - Directorate of Registration
  - Judicial Administration Training Institute
- Legislative and Parliamentary Affairs Division
  - Bangladesh Law Commission
  - Bangladesh National Human Rights Commission
  - The Attorney General's Office

=== Ministry of Land ===
- Land Appeal Board
- Land Record and Survey Department
- Land Reform Board
- Land Administration Training Centre (LATC)

=== Ministry of Local Government, Rural Development and Co-operatives ===
- Local Government Division
  - Local Government Engineering Department
  - Department of Public Health Engineering
  - National Institute of Local Government
  - Office of the Registrar General, Birth & Death Registration
  - District Councils
  - Sub-district Councils
  - City Corporations of Bangladesh
    - Barisal City Corporation
    - Chittagong City Corporation
    - Comilla City Corporation
    - Gazipur City Corporation
    - Khulna City Corporation
    - Dhaka North City Corporation
    - Dhaka South City Corporation
    - Narayanganj City Corporation
    - Rajshahi City Corporation
    - Rangpur City Corporation
    - Sylhet City Corporation
    - Mymensingh City Corporation
    - Bogura City Corporation
  - Water Supply and Sewerage Authority
    - Chattogram WASA
    - Dhaka WASA
    - Khulna WASA
    - Rajshahi WASA
    - Sylhet WASA
  - Municipal Councils
  - Union Councils
- Rural Development and Co-operatives Division
  - Department of Cooperatives
  - Bangladesh Rural Development Board (BRDB)
  - Rural Poverty Alleviation Foundation (PDBF)
  - Small Farmer Development Foundation (SFDF)
  - Bangladesh Cooperative Bank
  - Bangladesh Dairy Farmer Co-operative Union Limited (Milk Vita)
  - Bangladesh Academy for Rural Development (BARD)
  - Rural Development Academy, Bogra
  - Rural Development Academy, Gopalganj

=== Ministry of Planning ===
1. Planning Division

- Bangladesh Institute of Development Studies
- Planning Commission
- National Academy for Planning and Development

2. Statistics and Informatics Division

- Bangladesh Bureau of Statistics

3. Implementation Monitoring and Evaluation Division

- Central Procurement Technical Unit

=== Ministry of Posts, Telecommunications and Information Technology ===
- Posts and Telecommunications Division
  - Bangladesh Telecommunication Regulatory Commission
  - Bangladesh Post Office
  - Bangladesh Telecommunications Company Ltd
  - Bangladesh Submarine Cable Company Limited
  - Teletalk Bangladesh Ltd
  - Telephone Shilpa Sangstha
  - Bangladesh Cable Shilpa Limited
  - Bangladesh Communication Satellite Company Limited
- Information and Communication Technology Division
  - Bangladesh Hi-Tech Park Authority
  - Department of Information and Communication Technology
  - Bangladesh Computer Council
  - Controller of Certifying Authority
  - Mailing Operator and Courier Services Licensing Authority
  - Bangladesh Communications Satellite Company Limited
  - Cyber Security Agency

=== Ministry of Religious Affairs ===
- Office of the Waqf Administrator
- Christian Religious Welfare Trust
- Bangladesh Hajj Office
- Buddhist Religious Welfare Trust
- Islamic Foundation Bangladesh
- Hindu Religious Welfare Trust
- Bangladesh Haj Office, Jeddah

=== Ministry of Shipping ===
- Chittagong Port Authority
- Bangladesh Land Port Authority
  - List of land port in Bangladesh
- National Maritime Institute
- Bangladesh Inland Water Transport Authority
- Bangladesh Inland Water Transport Corporation
- Bangladesh Marine Academy
- Bangladesh Shipping Corporation
- Mongla Port Authority
- Payra Port Authority
- Department of Shipping
- Directorate of Seamen and Emigration Welfare

=== Ministry of Social Welfare ===
- National Disabled Development Foundation
- Bangladesh National Social Welfare Council
- Department of Social Services
- Sheikh Zayed Bin Sultan al Nahyan Trust Bangladesh
- Physically Disabled Protection Trust
- Neuro-Developmental Disability Protection Trust

=== Ministry of Women and Children Affairs ===
- National Women's Agency
- Bangladesh Shishu Academy
- Department of Women Affairs
- National Trauma Counselling Centre
- Joyeeta Foundation

=== Ministry of Water Resources ===
- Institute of Water Modeling
- River Research Institute
- Water Resources Planning Organisation (WARPO)
- Bangladesh Water Development Board
- Bangladesh Haor and Wetland Development Board
- Flood Forecasting and Warning Centre
- Joint River Commission, Bangladesh
- Centre for Environmental and Geographic Information Services

=== Ministry of Youth and Sports ===
- Directorate of Sports
- National Sports Council
- Bangladesh Krira Shikkha Protishtan (BKSP) (Bangladesh Sports Education)
- Youth Development Department
- National Institute of Youth Development
- Bangladesh Krirashebi Kalyan Foundation

=== Ministry of Liberation War Affairs ===
- Bangladesh Freedom Fighter Welfare Trust
- National Freedom Fighter Council
- Directorate of July Mass Uprising

=== Ministry of Expatriates' Welfare and Overseas Employment ===
- Bureau of Manpower Employment and Training
- Bangladesh Institute of Marine Technology
- Wage Earners' Welfare Board (WEWB)
- Wages Earners’ Welfare Fund
- Bangladesh Overseas Employment and Services Limited (BOESL)
- Probashi Kallyan Bank

=== Ministry of Railways ===
- Bangladesh Railway
- Department of Railway Inspection

=== Ministry of Science and Technology ===
- Bangladesh Atomic Energy Commission
- Bangladesh Council of Scientific and Industrial Research
- National Museum of Science and Technology
- National Institute of Biotechnology
- Bangladesh Computer Council
- Bangladesh National Scientific and Technical Documentation Centre
- Novo Theatre, Dhaka
- National Museum of Science and Technology
- Bangladesh Hi-Tech Park Authority
- Kaliakoir Hi–Tech Park
- Bangladesh Atomic Energy Regulatory Authority
- Bangladesh Oceanographic Research Institute
- Nuclear Power Plant Company Bangladesh Limited
- Science and Technology Fellowship Trust
- National Council for Science and Technology

=== Ministry of Disaster Management and Relief ===
- Cyclone Preparedness Programme (CPP)
- Disaster Management Directorate
- Office of the Refugee Relief and Repatriation Commissioner

== Intelligence ==
=== National ===
- Bangladeshi intelligence community
  - National Security Intelligence
  - Special Branch
    - Criminal Investigation Department
    - Counter Terrorism and Transnational Crime Unit

=== Military ===
- Directorate General of Forces Intelligence (DGFI)
  - Counter Terrorism and Intelligence Bureau

== See also ==
- Politics of Bangladesh
- Government of Bangladesh
- List of Government-Owned Companies of Bangladesh
