= Dhaka Mercantile Co-Operative Bank Limited =

Co-operative based on Dhaka, Bangladesh

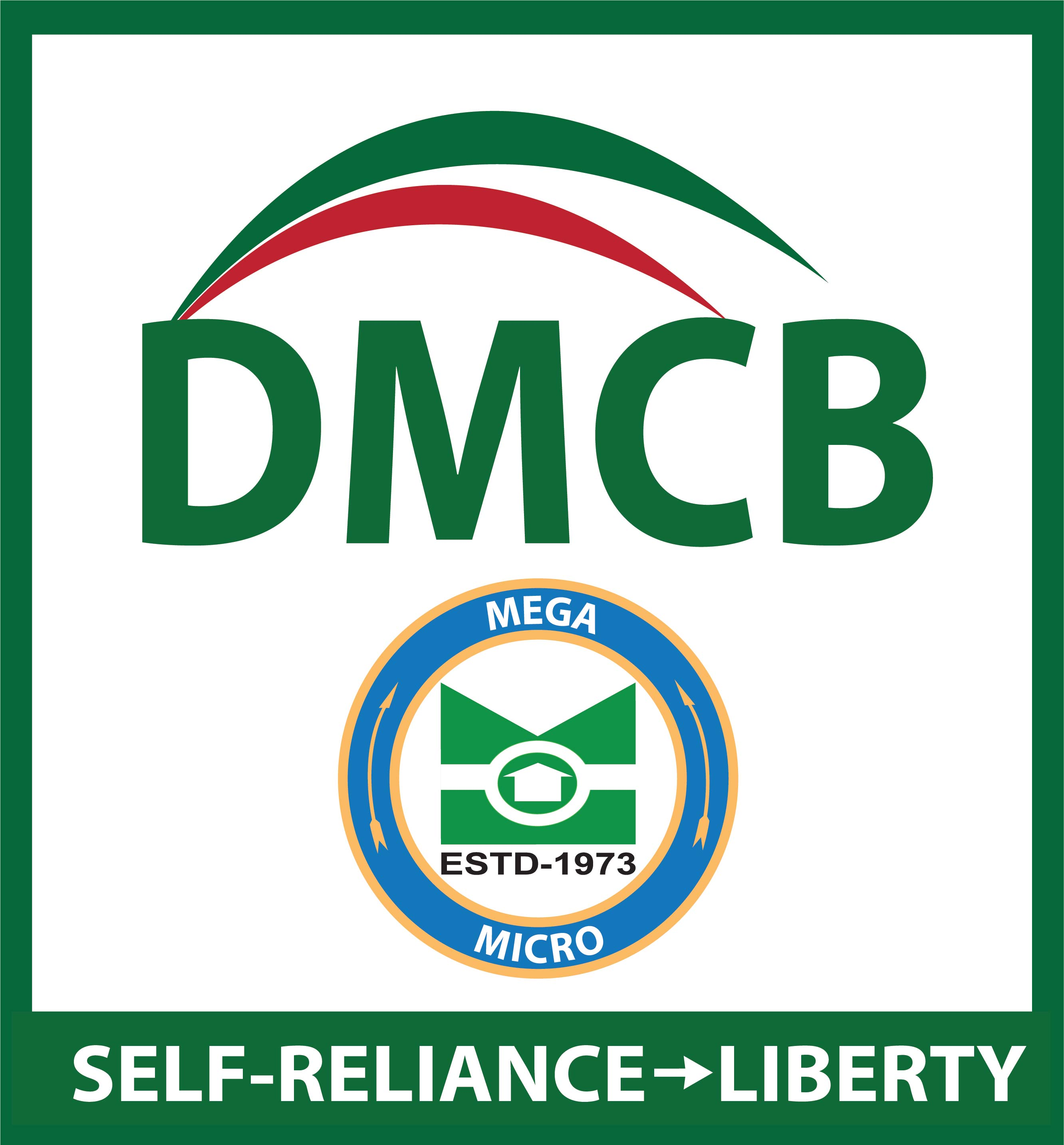
- Industry: Banking; Financial services
- Founded: 1973; 53 years ago
- Headquarters: Dhaka, Bangladesh
- Area served: Bangladesh
- Products: Retail banking, corporate banking, mortgage loans, private banking, credit cards, mobile banking
- Website: dmcbl.com

Dhaka Mercantile Co-Operative Bank Limited is a cooperative society based in Dhaka, Bangladesh which operates as a bank. There are some legal controversies over its use of bank in its name. It has 143 branches across Bangladesh.

== History ==
Dhaka Mercantile Co-Operative Bank Limited was established on 6 January 1973 as a cooperative society licensed under the Bengal Co-operative Societies Act, 1940.

Dhaka Mercantile Co-Operative Bank Limited went through a revival in 2001 led by retired Group Captain Abu Zafar Chowdhury.

In February 2005, the chairman of the bank, Abu Zafar Chowdhury, defended the bank from Bangladesh Bank which questioned the use of bank in the name of Dhaka Mercantile Co-Operative Bank Limited.

On 11 July 2007, Group Captain Abu Zafar Chowdhury was re-elected chairman of Dhaka Mercantile Co-Operative Bank Limited.

The Rural Development and Co-operatives Division in July 2016 ordered the Department of Cooperatives to appoint an administrator of the Dhaka Mercantile Co-Operative Bank Limited. The department subsequently appointed joint registrar Md Nuruzzaman to Dhaka Mercantile Co-Operative Bank Limited but the employees of the cooperative refused to let him join as they said an appeal against the appointment was filed with the courts.

In October 2016 a meeting was held by six regulators of Bangladesh, Bangladesh Bank, Bangladesh Securities and Exchange Commission, Department of Cooperatives, Insurance Development and Regulatory Authority of Bangladesh, Microcredit Regulatory Authority, and Registrar of Joint Stock Companies And Firms, to discuss the Dhaka Mercantile Co-Operative Bank Limited. The regulators agreed that Dhaka Mercantile Co-Operative Bank Limited was engaged in banking without proper licensing. Dhaka Mercantile Co-Operative Bank Limited had 9.81 billion BDT in deposits and 10.79 billion BDT in loans. Dhaka Mercantile Co-Operative Bank Limited was using the word bank in its name violating the Co-operative Societies (Amendment) Act, 2013 through securing an injunction from Bangladesh High Court. The Department of Cooperatives considered liquidating the bank.

In January 2020, the Anti-Corruption Commission filed a case against three officials of Dhaka Mercantile Co-Operative Bank Limited, including the former chairman, vice chairman, and managing director of the bank, for embezzling 92.5 million BDT from the bank.

World Confederation of Business awarded The Bizz award to Dhaka Mercantile Co-Operative Bank Limited in November 2021.

In February 2022, Dhaka Mercantile Co-Operative Bank Limited signed an agreement with Bangladesh Hockey Federation to sponsor the Bangladesh men's national field hockey team for the 2022 Men's AHF Cup. It wrote a check worth 11 million BDT to the Hockey Federation. Dhaka Mercantile Co-Operative Bank Limited opened its 136 branch in Bogra District in November 2022. Dhaka Mercantile Co-Operative Bank Limited opened its 138 branch in Patuakhali District. The 139th branch was opened in Habiganj District.

== Board of directors ==
Name	Title	Reference
Group Captain Abu Zafar Chowdhury	Chief Custodian	
Major A. T. M. Hamidul Hossain Tariq	Director	
Lieutenant General Mohammad Mahfuzur Rahman	Director	
Wing Commander Mir Ali Akhtar	Director	
Group Captain Khan Md. Nazib	Director	
Brigadier General Md. Mahmudur Rahman Khandker	Director	
Major General A. K. M. Abdullahil Baquee	Director	
Brigadier General A. K. M. Shamsuddin	Director	
Brigadier General Shah-Noor-Jilani	Director	
Shamsun Nahar	Managing Director	
