= Institute of Apparel Management =

Educational institution in Chittagong, Bangladesh

- ইনস্টিটিউট অব অ্যাপারেল ম্যানেজমেন্ট
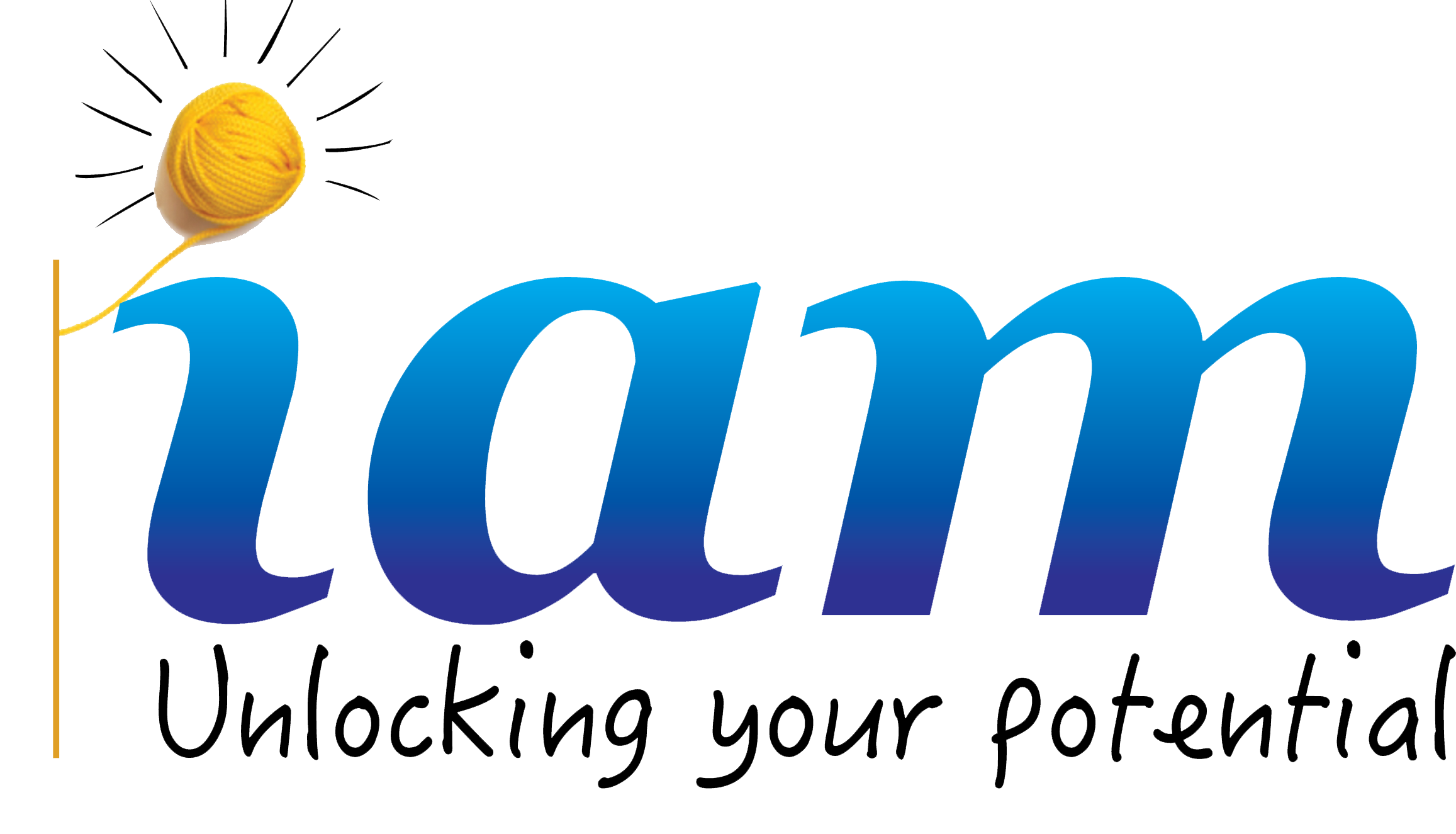
- Other name: IAM
- Motto: Unlocking your potential
- Type: Private
- Established: 1 July 2016
- Affiliations: National Skills Development Authority
- Location: 28 M. M. Ali Road, Lalkhan Bazar, Chittagong, 4000, Bangladesh; 22.3494°N 91.8209°E
- Campus: Urban
- Website: https://www.iamedu.org

The Institute of Apparel Management, usually known as IAM, is a non-profit educational institution located in Chittagong, Bangladesh. The institute provides necessary training to create skilled human resources for the readymade garment industry.

== History ==
The Institute of Apparel Management was established in 2016. Since its inception, the institute has been imparting training on various subjects to enhance the skills of mid-level management in the apparel industry. IAM works in collaboration with National Skills Development Authority (NSDA) recognized "Skills Training Providers" (STP) and local and international organizations such as Skills For Employment Investment Program (SEIP) and Bangladesh Garment Manufacturers and Exporters Association (BGMEA).

Apart from regular courses, the Institute of Apparel Management provides free training on the SEIP-BGMEA project.

== See also ==
- Textile Engineering College, Chittagong
- Port City International University
