= Toshakhana =

Storage space for treasure in the Indian subcontinent

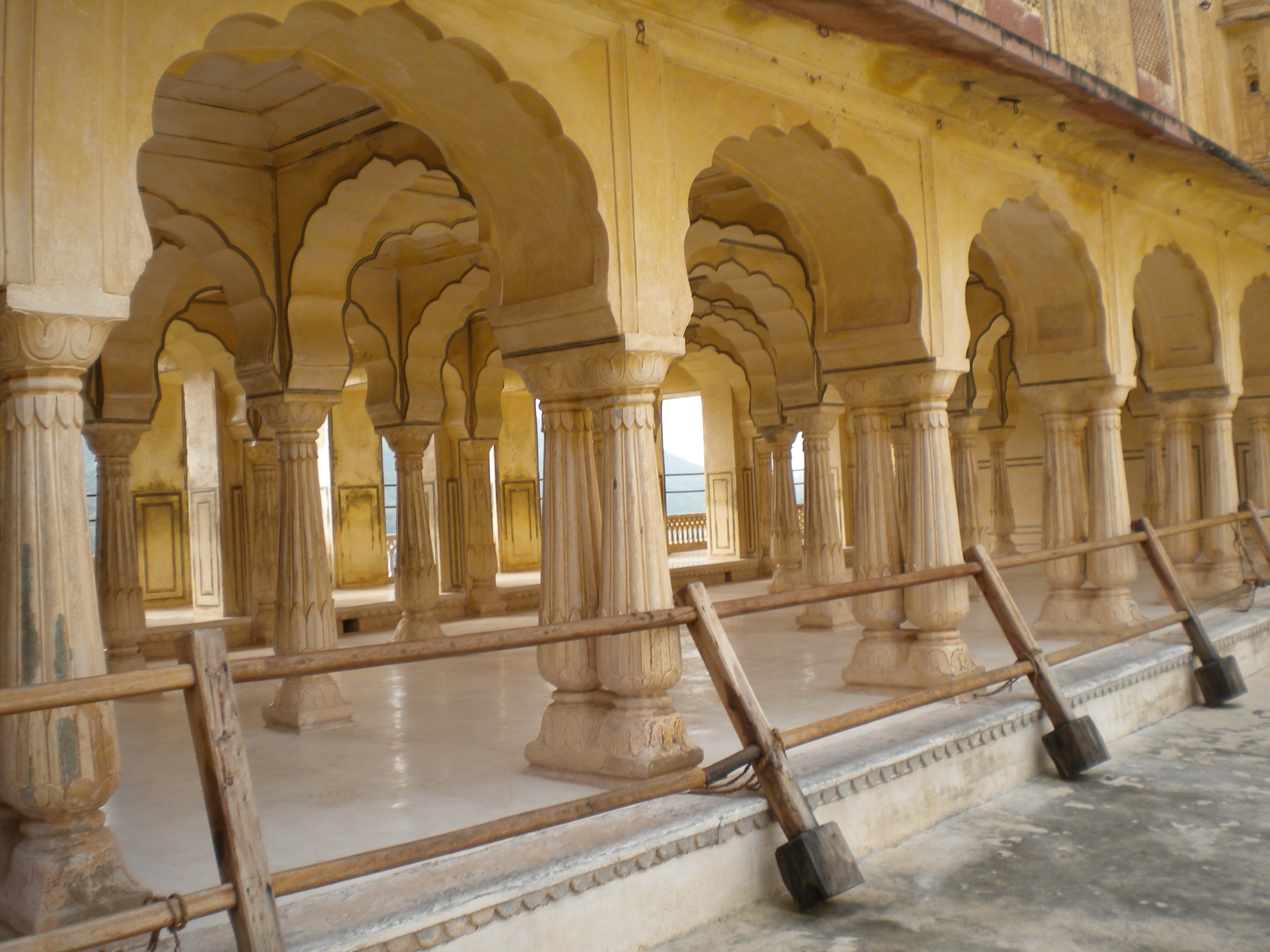
Amber Fort - Toshakhana

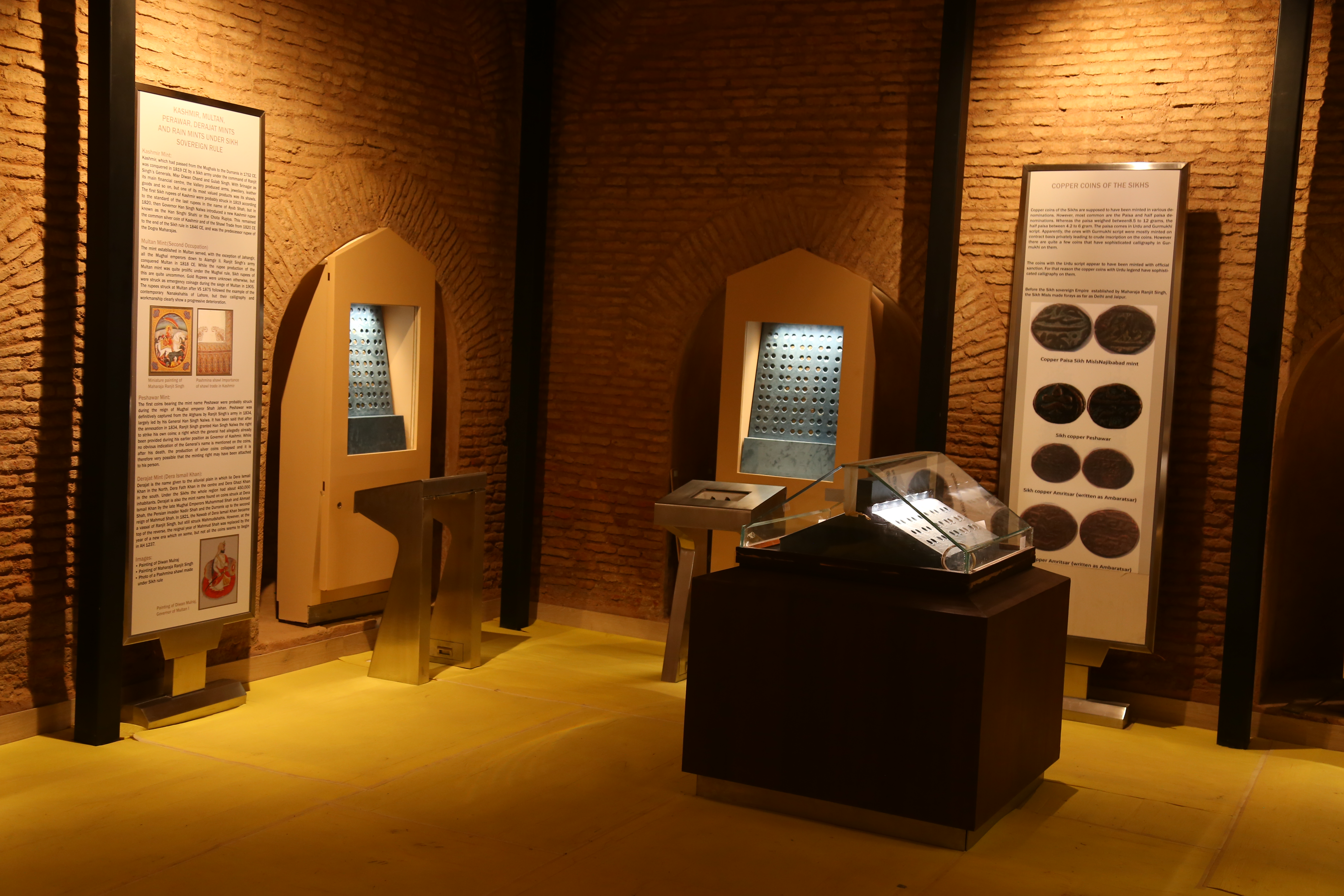
Toshakhana, Gobindgarh Fort, Amritsar

The toshakhana was originally a Mughal place where princes store "gifts and emblems of honor that they received for their posterity ... an archive of objects whose origin and receipt embodied his status and honor" The term is of Persian origin that literally translates as "treasure house".

Modern toshakhanas exist in India, Pakistan and Bangladesh.

== Modern usage ==
=== India ===
Under British colonial rule, officials of the East India Company were not allowed to accept diplomatic gifts, often weapons or jewels, known as khilat, from Indian or Middle Eastern rulers and their subjects. When procedure required that the officials received such a khilat, the official would deposit it in the company's treasury (toshakhana). The objects were later used for exchange gifts with other rulers, when it was deemed appropriate to enter an exchange of khilat. The records of a 1930s East India Company toshakhana at Bushire show that weapons and ammunition were kept in bulk for giving to the Trucial Coast sheikhs.

Two particularly rare items kept in the toshakhana of the Golden Temple are a richly bejeweled canopy, and a chandoa (a diamond-encrusted piece of cloth hung over the Guru Granth Sahib). The cost of the artefacts was pegged at Rs 200 crore. A present from the Nizam of Kingdom of Hyderabad to Maharaja Ranjit Singh was reportedly considered too lavish a gift and was sent to the Golden Temple, as well as a chandan da chaur (flywhisk) made of sandalwood fibres which took years for Haji Muhammad Maskin, a Muslim craftsman to prepare.

In India, as per protocol, all gifts received by the Prime Minister and other officials from overseas have to be deposited in toshakhana for evaluation. Such gifts could be anything - paintings, sarees and other artefacts. Indian toshakhana is managed by the Ministry of External Affairs. The Ministry has its own rate of evaluation done by dedicated personnel. As per a June 1978 gazette notification, every gift received by a person during an official visit should be deposited in the toshakhana within 30 days of his return. Indian rules allow the recipient to keep a gift valued below Rs 5,000 (US$70). Those valued above are evaluated to allow for purchase by the recipient on payment of the difference. The rest are auctioned off. By order, the government has just amended an over 50-year-old rule to allow Indian Administrative Service, Indian Police Service and Indian Forest Service officers to retain gifts received from foreign dignitaries while being members of the Indian delegation. But they must declare them if they are worth more than Rs 25,000 (US$340). India has a longer toshakhana history, also of the rules being circumvented. Individual greed, as anywhere, has played its role. Many years ago, a minister who received an expensive gold-plated watch from a Gulf sheikh, told the legislature when caught that being "busy" he had "forgot to declare" the gift. While toshakhana rule applies to the President, the Prime Minister, ministers and presiding officers of legislatures in many countries, in India, the scope is wider and includes even middle-level bureaucrats. The Ministry of External Affairs that maintains the toshakhana is thus required to issue a quarterly list. Gifts received at home are also accounted for. Countries/governments from where the gift is received are not mentioned. A Sikh toshakhana is located on the first floor of the Darshani Deorhi, the gateway to the Golden Temple.

=== Outside India ===
The government of Pakistan has its own toshakhana for gifts from other states or head of states. Bangladesh also has its toshakhana.
