= Military Engineer Services =

Military Engineer Services may refer to:

- Military Engineer Services (Bangladesh)
- Military Engineer Services (India)
- Military Engineer Services (Pakistan)
