= A. T. M. Hamidul Hossain Tariq =

Bangladesh Army veteran

- Born: 9 April 1951 (age 75); Bogra, East Bengal, Pakistan
- Military career
- Allegiance: Bangladesh
- Branch: Bangladesh Army
- Service years: 1975 - 1989
- Rank: Major
- Unit: East Bengal Regiment
- Commands: 2IC of 14th East Bengal Regiment; BM of 46th Independent Infantry Brigade
- Conflicts: Bangladesh Liberation War
- Awards: Bir Bikrom

A. T. M. Hamidul Hossain Tariq is a retired major of the Bangladesh Army and veteran of the Bangladesh Liberation War.

== Early life ==
Tariq was born in 1951 in Bogra and studied at Bogra Zilla School. His father, Abdul Hamid, was a deputy superintendent of police.

== Career ==
Tariq joined the Bangladesh Liberation War in 1971 when he was 19 years old and a university student. He was motivated to join the war following the 7 March Speech of Sheikh Mujibur Rahman. He was trained in India. He fought in sector-7 in the Mukti Bahini. He commanded a Mukti Bahini camp during the war. His unit liberated Fulbari Upazila from the Pakistan Army on 1 December 1971. After India joined the war, his unit joined the 6th Guard Regiment of the Indian Army led by Lieutenant Colonel V. K. Datta. For his role in the war, he was awarded Bir Bikrom, the third highest gallantry award of Bangladesh, and he was the youngest recipient of the award. He was hit by bullets eight times during the war. After the Pakistan Army surrendered on 16 December 1971, Tariq entered Bogra on a tank on 18 December.

Tariq joined the Bangladesh Army in 1974. He was a second lieutenant stationed in Comilla Cantonment during the assassination of Sheikh Mujibur Rahman. Tariq retired from the Bangladesh Army as a major in 1989. He joined Padma Oil Company, a state-owned company, after retirement.

Tariq has written extensively on the liberation war; writing 35 books on the war. He was awarded the National Kabi Shamsur Rahman Memorial Award for his literary works. He is a director of the Dhaka Mercantile Co-Operative Bank Limited. He signed a statement in 2020 calling for the punishment of those who vandalized a statue of Sheikh Mujibur Rahman, along with other veterans of the Bangladesh Liberation War. He was the president of the Chittagong University Alumni Association '82.

Tariq is a director of Dhaka Mercantile Co-Operative Bank Limited. He joined the bank in 2005 at his friend Group Captain Abu Zafar Chowdhury's request.
