= Craig Baxter =

American diplomat and historian

- Born: 16 February 1929; Elizabeth, New Jersey, United States
- Died: 7 February 2008 (Aged 78); Huntingdon, Pennsylvania, United States
- Spouse: Barbara Stevens Baxter (married 1984; died 2003)
- Children: Craig Baxter II, Louise S. Baxter
- Relatives: William J. Baxter (brother)

Academic background
- Education: University of Pennsylvania
- Thesis: The Jana Sangh, a Biography of an Indian Political Party (1967)

Academic work
- Discipline: History, Political Science
- Institutions: University of Pennsylvania, Northern Virginia Centre, United States Military Academy, Mount Vernon College, Juniata College

Craig Baxter (16 February 1929 – 7 February 2008) was an American diplomat, academic, and historian of South Asian history. He was the founder of the American Institute of Bangladesh Studies.

== Early life ==
Baxter was born on 16 February 1929 in Elizabeth, New Jersey, and raised in Union, New Jersey, and Cleveland, Ohio. Baxter graduated from the Wharton School of the University of Pennsylvania in 1951 with a B.S. in economics. He served in the United States Army for two years and then did his master's in Political Science from the University of Pennsylvania in 1954. He studied Hindi and Urdu languages at the Foreign Service Institute. He was appointed as political officer at the United States Embassy in Delhi. He then did his PhD at the University of Pennsylvania, completed in 1967, on the Bharatiya Jana Sangh, a right-wing Hindu nationalist party in India and the precursor of the present-day Bharatiya Janata Party, which was later published as a book in 1969.

== Career ==
Baxter held various senior foreign service posts between 1965 and 1978 in India, Pakistan, Afghanistan, Ghana, and Bangladesh. Baxter headed the Bangladesh Desk at the US State Department during the Bangladesh Liberation War. He was the only US diplomat authorized to communicate with Bengali diplomats during the war. In the late 1970s he served as the Deputy Chief of the United States Mission to Bangladesh. From 1978 to 1980, he was the Officer-in-Charge for International Scientific Relations for the Near East, South Asia, and Africa.

In the early-1980s Baxter joined Juniata College in Huntingdon, Pennsylvania as a professor of political science and history and went on to become the chair of political science at the college. He founded the American Institute of Bangladesh Studies in 1989.

Baxter wrote approximately 13 books on the geopolitics and history of South Asia and various articles in academic journals and chapters in collected/edited books. He edited and annotated the book, Diaries of Field Marshal Mohammad Ayub Khan, 1966-1972.

== Personal life ==
Baxter married Barbara Stevens in 1984. With her, Craig had a son, Craig Baxter II and, a daughter, Louise S. Baxter. Baxter was a trustee of the J.C. Blair Memorial Hospital Foundation and a member of the Huntingdon Rotary Club, Blair Country chapter, Sons of the American Revolution, Society of Mayflower Descendants, and the Huntingdon Presbyterian Church.

== Death ==
Baxter died on 7 February 2008 in Huntingdon, Pennsylvania, aged 78, after a brief illness. The Dr. Craig Baxter Memorial Fund was established in 2008 through a donation by his estate. It provides financial support to South Asian studies.

== Select publications ==
- The Jana Sangh, a Biography of an Indian Political Party (Philadelphia: University of Pennsylvania Press, 1969, and Bombay: Oxford University Press, 1971).
- Bangladesh: a New Nation in an Old Setting (Boulder CO: Westview Press, 1984).
- From Martial Law to Martial Law: Politics in the Punjab, 1919-1958 (Boulder CO: Westview Press, 1985, and Lahore: Vanguard Press, 1985). An edited and annotated translation of Martial Law-se Martial Law-tak (Urdu) by Syed Nur Ahmad.
- Government and Politics in South Asia (Boulder CO: Westview Press, 1987, and Lahore: Vanguard Press, 1988). With Yogendra K. Malik, Charles H. Kennedy, and Robert C. Oberst. Second edition: (Boulder CO: Westview Press, 1990). Third edition: (Boulder CO: Westview Press, and Lahore: Pak Book Corporation, 1993). Fourth edition: (Boulder CO, 1998). Fifth edition: Boulder CO, 2002.
- Historical Dictionary of Bangladesh (Metuchen, N.J.: Scarecrow Press, 1989). Second edition: (Metuchen NJ: Scarecrow Press, 1996). Third edition: (Lanham MD: Scarecrow Press, and New Delhi: Vision Books, 2004) With Syedur Rahman.
- Pakistan Under the Military: Eleven Years of Zia ul-Haq (Boulder CO: Westview Press and Karachi: Pak Book Corporation, 1990). With Shahid Javed Burki.
- Bangladesh: From Nation to State (Boulder: Westview Press, 1997).
- Diaries of Field Marshal Mohammad Ayub Khan, 1966-1972 (Karachi: Oxford University Press, 2007). Edited and annotated by Craig Baxter.
