= Bangladesh Samabaya Bank Limited =

Bangladeshi bank

- Formerly: Bengal Provincial Co-operative Bank Ltd. (1922-1947); East Pakistan Provincial Co-operative Bank Ltd. (1958-1971); Bangladesh National Co-operative Bank Ltd. (1972-1978)
- Company type: Private Commercial Bank
- Industry: Banking
- Founded: 1922
- Headquarters: Dhaka, Bangladesh
- Area served: Bangladesh
- Services: Consumer loans; Lease financing; Retail products; SME; Trade finance
- Website: www.bsbl.org.bd

Bangladesh Samabaya Bank Limited is a cooperative bank located in Dhaka, Bangladesh.

== History ==
In 1922, the Bengal provincial Co-operative Bank in Kolkata was founded to provide loans to farmers in Bengal. In 1947, the bank was temporarily closed following the Partition of India. The registrar of co-operative societies of East Bengal, Iqbal Atahar Ali, held a meeting to decide the future of the bank. The bank was placed under the East Pakistan provincial co-operatives ministry in Dhaka and renamed East Pakistan Provincial Co-operative Bank Ltd on 31 March 1948. It was renamed Bangladesh Jatiya Samabaya Bank Ltd after the independence of Bangladesh. It was renamed to Bangladesh Samabaya Bank Ltd in 1977.

The government of Bangladesh listed the Bangladesh Samabaya Bank Limited as a specialized institution until 2000, when it was changed to a non-banking financial institution.

An Awami League politician was stabbed to death in November 2013 after he left a meeting at the office of the chairman of Bangladesh Samabaya Bank Limited in Motijheel.

In May 2015, Mohiuddin Ahmed was re-elected chairman of Bangladesh Samabay Bank Limited.

In January 2021, Department of Cooperatives announced plans to turn Bangladesh Samabaya Bank Limited into a specialized bank. In February, three senior officers of Bangladesh Samabaya Bank Limited admitted to the Anti-Corruption Commission that they embezzled gold worth 114.3 million BDT from customer deposits with the bank. They alleged they did so on instructions from the chairman of Bangladesh Samabaya Bank Limited and other senior personnel of the bank.

An investigation by the Bangladesh Samabaya Bank Limited in December 2022 found that farmers in Ishwardi Upazila, Pabna District had defaulted on loans worth 1.6 million BDT taken under Bharoimari Uttopara Vegetable Farmers' Cooperative Association Limited. The farmers alleged they were given smaller loans than on paper the association and bank officials pocketed the difference. Some of these farmers were then arrested on loan default charges despite claiming they repaid the money to the bank. The farmers received bail on 27 November 2022. The Prothom Alo in an editorial spoke against the case and detention of the farmers.
