= Mongla Custom House =

Bangladesh government regulatory agency

- মোংলা কাস্টম হাউস
- Formation: 1951; 75 years ago
- Headquarters: Khulna, Bangladesh
- Region served: Bangladesh
- Official language: Bengali
- Website: Mongla Custom House

Mongla Custom House (Bengali: মোংলা কাস্টম হাউস) is a Bangladesh government regulatory agency under the Ministry of Finance responsible for collecting tariffs and customs duty in Mongla port town, Khulna city and Mongla Port.

== History ==
The Mongla Port was founded in 1950 to serve the southwestern region of East Bengal. It was originally known as Chalna Port. After the establishment of the port it was under East Pakistan Custom in Khulna office. In 1972 the Mongla sub-custom house and Benapole sub-custom house jointly founded the Mongla Custom House by the President's Order No. 62 of 1972 in Bangladesh is known as The Bangladesh Taxation Laws (Adaptation) Order, 1972.

In 1997 its office in Benapole also known as the Benapole sub-custom house became full-fledged Custom House, and renamed as Benapole Custom House. Which erases its justification over Benapole Port.

== See also ==
- Benapole Custom House
- Chittagong Custom House
- Dhaka Custom House
