= Rajshahi Krishi Unnayan Bank =

Bank of Bangladesh

- Type: state-owned bank
- Industry: Banking
- Founded: Rajshahi, Bangladesh
- Headquarters: Rajshahi, Bangladesh
- Key people: Dr. Mohammad Ali (Chairman); Wahida Begum (Managing Director)
- Products: Banking services Consumer Banking; Corporate Banking; Investment Banking
- Net income: ▲
- Website: Rajshahi Krishi Unnayan Bank

Rajshahi Krishi Unnayan Bank is a state-owned specialized financial institution for extending credit to the farmers of the 16 districts of Rajshahi and Rangpur divisions in Bangladesh. The headquarters of the bank is in Rajshahi.

== History ==
Rajshahi Krishi Unnayan Bank was established on 15 March 1987 through the Presidential Ordinance No 58. The bank's headquarters are located in Rajshahi. The bank was made for farmers of Rangpur and Rajshahi divisions. It received 253 branches of Bangladesh Krishi Bank in Rangpur and Rajshahi Division.

The bank worked with Asian Development Bank to implement Northwest Crop Diversification Project in 2003 to diversify the crops grown in Northern region of Bangladesh.

The Ministry of Finance ordered Rajshahi Krishi Unnayan Bank to reschedule loans to farmers in flood affected areas in August 2004. The bank provided special loans to Monga-affected farmers. It provided 6.77 billion taka in agriculture loans below its target of 7 billion taka.

On 26 July 2005, Ashraf Ali was appointed managing director of the bank.

Adviser Mirza Azizul Islam, in charge of the Ministry of Finance in the caretaker government, announced plans to distribute 63.51 billion taka agriculture loans through Rajshahi Krishi Unnayan Bank and seven other state owned banks in June 2007. Rajshahi Krishi Unnayan Bank raised their interest rate from 8 to 12 per cent in 2007. In August, former director of Rajshahi Krishi Unnayan Bank Lutfar Rahman, who was also president of Rajshahi Chamber of Commerce and Industries, was sued for taking bribes for approving loan applications.

From 2000 to 2008, the bank waived 180 million taka in interests with 100 million taka waived in 2002 alone. The bank provided funding for tea farming in Lalmonirhat District.

On 26 June 2010, M Shah Nawaz Ali was appointed chairman and Pradip Kumar Dutta was appointed the managing director of the bank.

In July 2011, Rajshahi Krishi Unnayan Bank joined a teach company in partnership with Bangladesh Commerce Bank, Sonali Bank, and Polaris Software.

The Daily Star reported on 17 April 2013 that Rajshahi Krishi Unnayan bank officials were taking bribes to give loans to farmers.

Bangladesh Bank set six conditions for Rajshahi Krishi Unnayan Bank to open new branches in January 2014 including 80 per cent of existing branches must be profitable. Its defaulted loans dropped in 2014.

Farmers in Gaibandha District blocked the branch of the bank protesting loan default cases filed against them and ask for easy conditions on the loans of the bank in July. In November 2015, Rajshahi Krishi Unnayan Bank postponed their recruitment exam in which 24 thousand applicants applied. The applicants blocked Dhaka-Rajshahi Highway protesting the decision.

Muhammad Awal Khan was appointed managing director of Rajshahi Krishi Unnayan Bank on 23 November 2016. It received 550 million taka from the government due to capital deficit at the bank.

Muhammad Nazrul Islam was appointed chairman of Rajshahi Krishi Unnayan Bank in January 2017. It had a 7.43 billion taka cash shortfall. Anti-Corruption Commission sued five officials of the bank for embezzlement.

Rajshahi Krishi Unnayan Bank had a 8.29 billion taka deficit in 2018. Bangladesh Bank reported that the bank was providing loans below cost.

On 23 November 2020, the managing director of Rajshahi Krishi Unnayan Bank A. K. M. Sajedur Rahman Khan was appointed deputy governor of Bangladesh Bank.

Md Zahidul Haque was appointed managing director of Rajshahi Krishi Unnayan Bank on 11 September 2022. 56 officials of the bank were denied promotion by the bank and went to court over the issue.

== Management ==
Management of the bank is entrusted by the government to a seven-member board of directors. The managing director is the chief executive of the bank.

== Board of directors ==
| Name | Position | Occupation | Reference |
|---|---|---|---|
| Dr. Mohammad Ali | Chairman | Retired Professor | |
| Wahida Begum | Managing Director | Banker | |
| Md. Shafiqul Islam | Director | Additional Director Department of Agricultural Extension, Rangpur Region, Rangpur | |
| Khondoker Azim Ahmed, ndc | Director | Rajshahi Divisional Commissioner | |
| Md. Shahidul Islam, NDC | Director | Rangpur Divisional Commissioner | |
| Md. Abdur Rauf | Director | Deputy Director of the Department of Fisheries | |
| Md. Abdul Hye Sarker | Director | Director of the Rangpur Divisional Livestock Office of the Department of Livestock Services | |
| Md. Azizur Rahman | Director | Additional Director Department of Agricultural Extension in Rajshahi Division | |
