= Surface Water Simulation Modelling Programme =

- Formation: 1986
- Headquarters: Dhaka, Bangladesh
- Region served: Bangladesh
- Official language: Bengali
- Website: http://www.iwmbd.org/ Surface Water Simulation Modelling Programme]

Surface Water Simulation Modelling Programme (SWSMP) launched in 1986 by the Ministry of Water Resources of Bangladesh Government under the Master Planning Organization to develop a high level of analytical capabilities by use of state-of-the-art mathematical water modelling which was the genesis of what at present is known as the Institute of Water Modelling (IWM).
