= Ministry of Land =

Government ministry of Bangladesh

- ভূমি মন্ত্রণালয়
- Government Seal of Bangladesh

Ministry overview
- Formed: 20 January 1972; 54 years ago
- Jurisdiction: Government of Bangladesh
- Headquarters: Bangladesh Secretariat, Segunbagicha, Dhaka
- Annual budget: ৳2437.47 crore (US$200 million) (2026-2027)
- Minster responsible: Mizanur Rahman Minu
- Minister of State responsible: Mir Mohammed Helal Uddin
- Ministry executive: Md. Khalilur Rahman, Secretary
- Child agencies: Land Appeal Board; Land Reform Board; Land Record and Survey Department; Land Administration Training Centre
- Website: minland.gov.bd

The Ministry of Land (Bengali: ভূমি মন্ত্রণালয়; Bhūmi mantraṇālaẏa) is the government ministry of Bangladesh responsible for formulating and implementing national policy on lands, cadastre and other subjects which come under its purview.

== Agencies ==
- Land Appeal Board
- Land Reform Board
- Land Record and Survey Department
- Land Administration Training Centre (LATC)
