= Institute of Water Modeling =

Research institute in Bangladesh

- Formation: 2002
- Headquarters: Dhaka, Bangladesh
- Region served: Bangladesh
- Official language: Bengali
- Website: www.iwmbd.org

Institute of Water Modeling or IWM, is a government trustee of Bangladesh Water Resource Ministry and think tank that carries out research, planning and technology transfer related to water management projects in Bangladesh and is located in Dhaka, Bangladesh.

== History ==
The Institute traces its origins to the Surface Water Simulation Modelling Programme which was founded 1986. It functioned under the Water Resources Planning Organisation. On 24 December 1996 the cabinet of Bangladesh Government decided to institutionalized the programme, which was renamed and established as Institute of Water Modeling on 1 August 2002.
