= National Child Labour Welfare Council =

Research institute in Bangladesh

- Formation: 2014
- Headquarters: Dhaka, Bangladesh
- Region served: Bangladesh
- Official language: Bengali

The National Child Labour Welfare Council (Bengali: জাতীয় শিশু শ্রমিক কল্যাণ কাউন্সিল) is a Bangladesh government council responsible for creating policies to end child labour in Bangladesh.

== History ==
The National Child Labour Welfare Council was established in 2014. The aim of the council is to plan and monitor the implementation of National Child Labor Elimination Policy. According to the National Child Labor Elimination Policy, the government of Bangladesh plans to eliminate all forms of child labour in Bangladesh. The first meeting of the council was held on 26 May 2015 in Dhaka. The meeting was chaired by Mujibul Haque, the state minister of labour and employment.
