= SAARC Agriculture Centre =

Regional Institute in Bangladesh

- Abbreviation: SAC
- Formation: 1988
- Location: Khamar Bari Road, Dhaka-1215, Bangladesh
- Region served: South Asia
- Official language: Bengali; English
- Website: www.sac.org.bd

SAARC Agriculture Centre (Bengali: সার্ক কৃষি কেন্দ্র) is a South Asian Association for Regional Cooperation Regional Centre responsible for promoting research and development in agriculture and allied sectors in South Asian countries. The Centre’s headquarter is in the Bangladesh Agricultural Research Council Complex, Farmgate, Dhaka. The Centre is headed by a Director, deputed by the host country Bangladesh; accompanied by regionally recruited competent Professional Staff designated as Senior Program Specialists (SPS), and the General Service Staff (GSS). Dr. Md. Baktear Hossain became director of the SAARC Agriculture Centre in December 2020. The Professional Staff are recruited from the regional competition among the applicants from the SAARC member states. There are six Senior Program Specialists (SPSs)- in the Centre to handle different themes of agriculture and allied sectors- crops, horticulture, livestock, fisheries, natural resources management (NRM) and priority setting & programme development (PSPD).

== History ==
SAARC Agriculture Centre was established by the South Asian Association for Regional Cooperation, a regional association of South Asian countries formed in 1985, in 1988 as the SAARC Agricultural Information Centre. In 2007, it was renamed to SAARC Agriculture Centre. The capital cost for establishing the centre was provided by the Government of Bangladesh. With the passage of time, the Centre braced up for broader challenges to make regional cooperation more responsive to the changing needs of the farming communities and relevant stakeholders. The SAARC Agriculture Centre has now been given an enhanced mandate for supporting the member states to address common regional challenges of the food and agriculture sector by strengthening agricultural research and extension systems, knowledge management, and appropriate agricultural policies and program development. It is financially supported by member states of SAARC and its contribution is based on a percentage of their national budgets.
