= Land Appeal Board =

Government body

- Formation: 1989
- Headquarters: Dhaka, Bangladesh
- Region served: Bangladesh
- Official language: Bengali
- Chairman: Md. Abdul Hannan (Secretary)
- Website: lab.portal.gov.bd

Land Appeal Board (Bengali: ভূমি আপীল বোর্ড) is a quasi-judicial government body that is responsible for hearing appeals filed over land management in Bangladesh. It advises the government on issues concerning land management and land administration. It is responsible for evaluating decisions made by land courts, upazila chairmen, and upazila members. Its judgments concerning land and law are final and cannot be appealed.

== History ==
The Land Appeal Board functions were originally incorporated in the Board of Revenue of the East India Company founded in 1772. The Board of Revenue continued to function independently until the Independence of Bangladesh in 1971 when its duties were assigned to the Land Administration and Land Reforms Division under the Ministry of Law and Land Reforms. In 1973 the Land Administration and Land Reforms Division became the new Ministry of Land and the Board of Revenue was abolished. The Land Appeal Board was created through the Land Appeal Board Act 1989 which passed through the parliament and was signed into law by the President of Bangladesh on 31 May 1989. The Board of Land Administration was split into two boards, the Land Appeals Board and the Land Reform Board. It is governed by a chairman and two members of the board.
