= Kaliakoir Hi–Tech Park =

Hi–Tech park in Bangladesh

Kaliakoir Hi–Tech Park or Hi–Tech City, Kaliakoir (HTCK) is a business park in Kaliakair of Gazipur District, Bangladesh. Originally called Kaliakoir Hi-Tech Park, after the municipality in which it is located, it was renamed in June 2016 to honor the founding president of Bangladesh, Sheikh Mujibur Rahman. After the fall of the Hasina regime, the name of this hi-tech city was renamed to Hi-Tech City, Kaliakoir. Many companies have invested in this sector.

== History ==
The hi-tech park was formally proposed in June 1999 at a meeting of the Board of Investment. A feasibility study was conducted in 2001 by the Bangladesh University of Engineering and Technology. A boundary wall was constructed in 2008. A further assessment was performed by PricewaterhouseCoopers in 2009. It said that one advantage of the location was that land acquisition was complete. In 2010, the Bangladesh Hi-Tech Park Authority (BHTPA) was formed to regulate and operate hi-tech business parks in the country.

By June 2015, the authority had awarded contracts for basic infrastructure. One of two parts of a bypass road for local residents was completed, as was an internal access road. Construction had begun on sewer lines and a sewage treatment plant; the boundary wall was being extended to enclose an expected expansion, and replaced where it had been demolished during other construction; installation of street lighting was underway; and refurbishment of a three-storey building built in 2009 but not yet occupied was in progress.

The original 232 acres (94 ha) site is divided into five blocks. Block 1 is reserved for government use. Blocks 2 and 5 are being built by Summit Technopolis, a joint venture between Summit Group of Bangladesh and Infinity Infotech Parks of India. Bangladesh TechnoSity is developing Block 3. As of 2020, Block 4 has not been awarded. Summit Technopolis broke ground on its portion on 28 February 2016. By June of that year, the project had been expanded to 355 acres (144 ha).

== Economy ==
The government offers various incentives to attract investors and tenants, such as tax breaks and exemptions on import duties.

As of November 2020, five companies are manufacturing in the park, employing 13,000 workers. Hyundai Motor Company has a manufacturing plant in this city.
