= Bangladesh Krirashebi Kalyan Foundation =

Government agency of Bangladesh

- Formation: 1975
- Headquarters: Dhaka, Bangladesh
- Region served: Bangladesh
- Official language: Bengali
- Website: bkkf.org.bd

The Bangladesh Krirashebi Kalyan Foundation (Bengali: বাংলাদেশ ক্রীড়াসেবী কল্যাণ ফাউন্ডেশন) is a welfare foundation, owned and supported by the Bangladesh government, for athletes in Bangladesh. It is under the Ministry of Youth and Sports.

== History ==
The formation of Bangabandhu Krirashebi Kalyan Foundation was approved by President Sheikh Mujibur Rahman on 6 August 1975. For a brief while it was called Bangladesh Krirabid Kalyan Trust. In 2009, the Government led by Sheikh Hasina changed the name back to Bangabandhu Krirashebi Kalyan Foundation. The foundation provides athletic scholarships.
