= Science and Technology Fellowship Trust =

Research institute in Bangladesh

- Formation: 2016
- Headquarters: Dhaka, Bangladesh
- Region served: Bangladesh
- Official language: Bengali
- Website: https://www.stft.gov.bd/

Science and Technology Fellowship Trust (Bengali: বিজ্ঞান ও প্রযুক্তি ফেলোশিপ ট্রাস্ট) is a Bangladesh government supported and funded scholarship program for science and technology education and research.

== History ==
The Trust was formed through the passage of Bangabandhu Science & Technology Trust Bill, 2016, in Parliament of Bangladesh on 16 February 2016. The trust is managed by a trustee board and headed by a Minister or State Minister. The 2016 bill for the trust was introduced in parliament by Yafes Osman, the Minister of Science and Technology. The Trust awarded 1554.5 million Bangladeshi taka ($18.3M as of 2020) worth of scholarships to 519 scholars from 2010 to 2020.

On March 20, 2025, the interim government of Bangladesh, through an ordinance, changed its name from Bangabandhu Science and Technology Fellowship Trust to Science and Technology Fellowship Trust.
