= Military Engineer Services (Bangladesh) =

Government organisation

- Abbreviation: MES
- Formation: 1975
- Type: Government Organisation
- Headquarters: Army Headquarters E in C's Branch, Works Directorate, Dhaka Cantonment, Dhaka
- Region served: Bangladesh
- Official language: Bangla, English
- E in C: Major General Hasan Uz Zaman ndu, afwc, psc, M Phil
- Parent organization: Ministry of Defence
- Affiliations: Bangladesh Armed Forces; Bangladesh Army; Bangladesh Navy; Bangladesh Air Force; Ministry of Defence
- Website: mes.org.bd
- Formerly called: Military Engineer Services East Pakistan

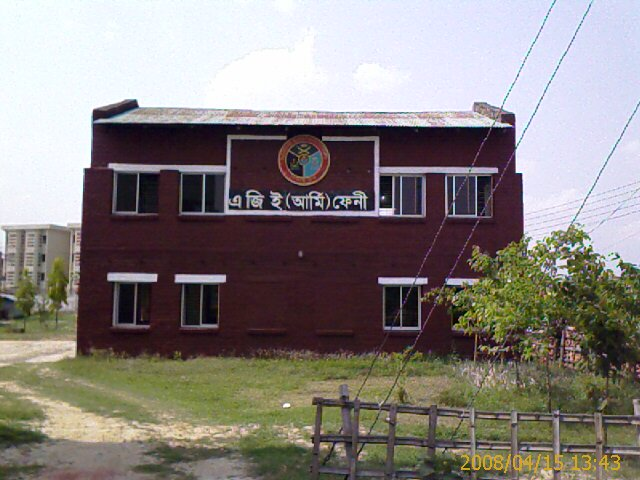
Only surviving building from World War II airfield in Bangladesh, used as office by the Military Engineer Services in Bangladesh

The Military Engineer Services is a government organisation in Bangladesh which is responsible for Military Infrastructure Development, maintenance and preservation of their creations. As the Public Works Department (PWD) of Bangladesh serves the public, this organisation only serves the Bangladesh Armed Forces. Major General Hasan Uz Zaman is the current E in C.

== Structure of MES ==
Name of MES Office and Subordinate Offices
E in C's Branch
↑ Works Directorate
↑ Director of works & Chief Engineer (Army)
↑ CMES (Army) Dhaka ↑	↑ CMES (Army) Chittagong ↑
1. GE (Army) Project Dhaka; 2. GE (Army) Main North; 3. GE (Army) Main South; 4. GE (Army) Mirpur; 5. GE (Army) Jalalabad	1. GE (Army) Project Chittagong; 2. GE (Army) Comilla; 3. AGE (Army) Bhatiari (BMA); 4. AGE (Army) Halisahar; 5. AGE (Army) Khagrachari; 6. AGE (Army) Bandarban; 7. AGE (Army) Rangamati
CMES (Army) Savar ↑	CMES (Army) Bogura ↑
1. GE (Army) Savar; 2. GE (Army) Ghatail; 3. GE (Army) (BAF) Gazipur; 4. GE (Army) Jessore; 5. AGE (Army) Rajendrapur; 6. AGE (Army) Momenshahi; 7. AGE (Army) Jahanabad; 8. GE (Army) BBSS	1. GE (Army) Rangpur; 2. GE (Army) Saidpur; 3. GE (Army) Bogura; 4. AGE (Army) Parbotipur; 5. AGE (Army) Qadirabad; 6. AGE (Army) Rajshahi
Director of Works and Chief Engineer (Navy)	Director of Works and Chief Engineer (Air Force)
↑ CMES (Navy) ↑	↑ CMES (Air) ↑
1. GE (Navy) Dhaka; 2. GE (Navy) Chittagong; 3. GE (Navy) Khulna; 4. AGE (Navy) Kaptai; 5. AGE (Navy) Project Chittagong	1. GE (Air) Kurmitola; 2. GE (Air) Tejgaon; 3. GE (Air) Chittagong; 4. GE (Air) Jessore; 5. AGE (Air) Paharkanchanpur; 6. AGE (Air) Air Head Co: Unit; 7. AGE (Air) Bogra; 8. AGE (Air) Shamshernagar; 9. Workshop MES (Air); 10. ESD MES (Air)

== History ==
After the independence of India and Pakistan, the name changed to Military Engineer Services East Pakistan. But the headquarters of the organisation was in West Pakistan. After the independence of Bangladesh, the name changed to Military Engineer Services Bangladesh and it started to serve the Bangladesh Armed Forces since 1975.

Major General Fazlur Rahman Al Mamun is the first E in C of Military Engineer Services of Bangladesh.

== Zones ==
all cantonments of the country and Mirpur DOHS , Military Hospitals, offices and residential areas which is under the Bangladesh Armed Forces is under control for development by the Military Engineer Services. This places are built, developed and secured by the organisation. the 12 cadet colleges of Bangladesh were also built and developed by this organisation.

== Work ==
This organisation 24/7 hours gives service to the military personnel. It is also responsible for providing electricity, gas, water, building and bathroom necessities, military infrastructure development, and secure environments to live in, etc. This organisation gained respect from other organisations for their performance.

== Activities ==
This organisation is responsible for the construction and maintenance of all cantonments, army-affiliated educational institutions, organizations in Bangladesh. MES has a role in the construction of major projects of Bangladesh Army, Bangladesh Navy and Bangladesh Air Force. Some of these projects are mentioned below:

- Army Central Mosque in Dhaka Cantonment
- Army Auditorium and Conference Complex
- 500 bedded Kurmitola General Hospital
- Armed Forces Medical College
- BMA Bangabandhu Complex
- 'A' Type Building at Shaheed Aziz Palli
- 'D' Type Building at Shaheed Moinul Road
- Dhaka Cantt. Mostafa Kamal Line Followers Quarter
- Mirpur NDC 'B' Type Quarter
- Mirpur DSSC 'E' Type Quarter
- BN School and College, Dograj, Mongla, Bagerhat
- BN School and College, Khulna
- Shaheen College Paharkanchanpur
- Mirpur Cantonment Public School and College
- Inauguration of SMBK and Office Complex
- Father of the Nation Monument
- Residence Hall, University of Chittagong
- Naval Headquarters, Banani, Dhaka Naval Headquarters Extension Building
- DGFI BUNGALOW
- SURVEY OF BANGLADESH
- BN ISSA KHA DOCKIER SHIP FITTING SHED
- ISSB MESS
- MIST FACULTY TOWER
- Feni Girls Cadet College
