= Neuro-Developmental Disability Protection Trust =

Bangladesh government welfare policy

- Formation: 2013
- Headquarters: Dhaka, Bangladesh
- Region served: Bangladesh
- Official language: Bengali
- Website: nddtrust.gov.bd

The Neuro-Developmental Disability Protection Trust (Bengali:নিউরো-ডেভেলপমেন্টাল প্রতিবন্ধী সুরক্ষা ট্রাস্ট) is a Bangladesh government owned and operated trust providing welfare to those with autism and neurodevelopmental problems. The trust falls under the Ministry of Social Welfare.

== History ==
The Neuro-Developmental Disability Protection Trust was established in 2013 by the government of Bangladesh to provide services and benefits to those with autism and neurodevelopmental problems. The trust is responsible for protecting the rights and quality of life of people with disabilities. It was created after Bangladesh signed the Convention on the Rights of Persons with Disabilities in 2006. The parliament of Bangladesh passed the Neuro-developmental Disabled Persons Protection and Trust Act, 2013 to establish the trust. Prime Minister Sheikh Hasina stated that "The Neuro Developmental Disability Protection Act, 2013" and "The Persons with Disability Rights and Protection Trust Act, 2013" were enacted to safeguard the rights of people with disabilities in Bangladesh. The creation of the trust was supported by Saima Wazed Hossain, daughter of Sheikh Hasina.

The Trust started functioning in 2014. In 2019, its budget was increased to 275 million BDT from 105 million BDT. Md. Golam Rabbani was chairperson of the trust. In 2023, the trust created the first inclusive national curriculum for children with disabilities. The trust was allocated 397 million BDT by the government for the 2025 fiscal year, representing a 40 million BDT increase from the previous year.
