= Directorate of Seamen and Emigration Welfare =

Bangladeshi governmental directorate

- Formation: 1972
- Headquarters: Dhaka, Bangladesh
- Region served: Bangladesh
- Official language: Bengali
- Website: Directorate of Seamen and Emigration Welfare

Directorate of Seamen and Emigration Welfare (Bengali: নাবিক ও প্রবাসী শ্রমিক কল্যাণ পরিদপ্তর) is a directorate of the Bangladesh government under the Ministry of Shipping responsible for the welfare of seamen and those employed in water vessels. Commodore Syed Ariful Islam is the Director General of the Directorate of Seamen and Emigration Welfare.

== History ==
Directorate of Seamen and Emigration Welfare was established by 1971 soon after the Independence of Bangladesh. The government combined Directorate of Seamen's Welfare, National Employment Bureau, and Protector of Emigrants to form the Directorate of Seamen and Emigration Welfare.
