= Dhaka Custom House =

Bangladesh government regulatory agency

- ঢাকা কাস্টম হাউস
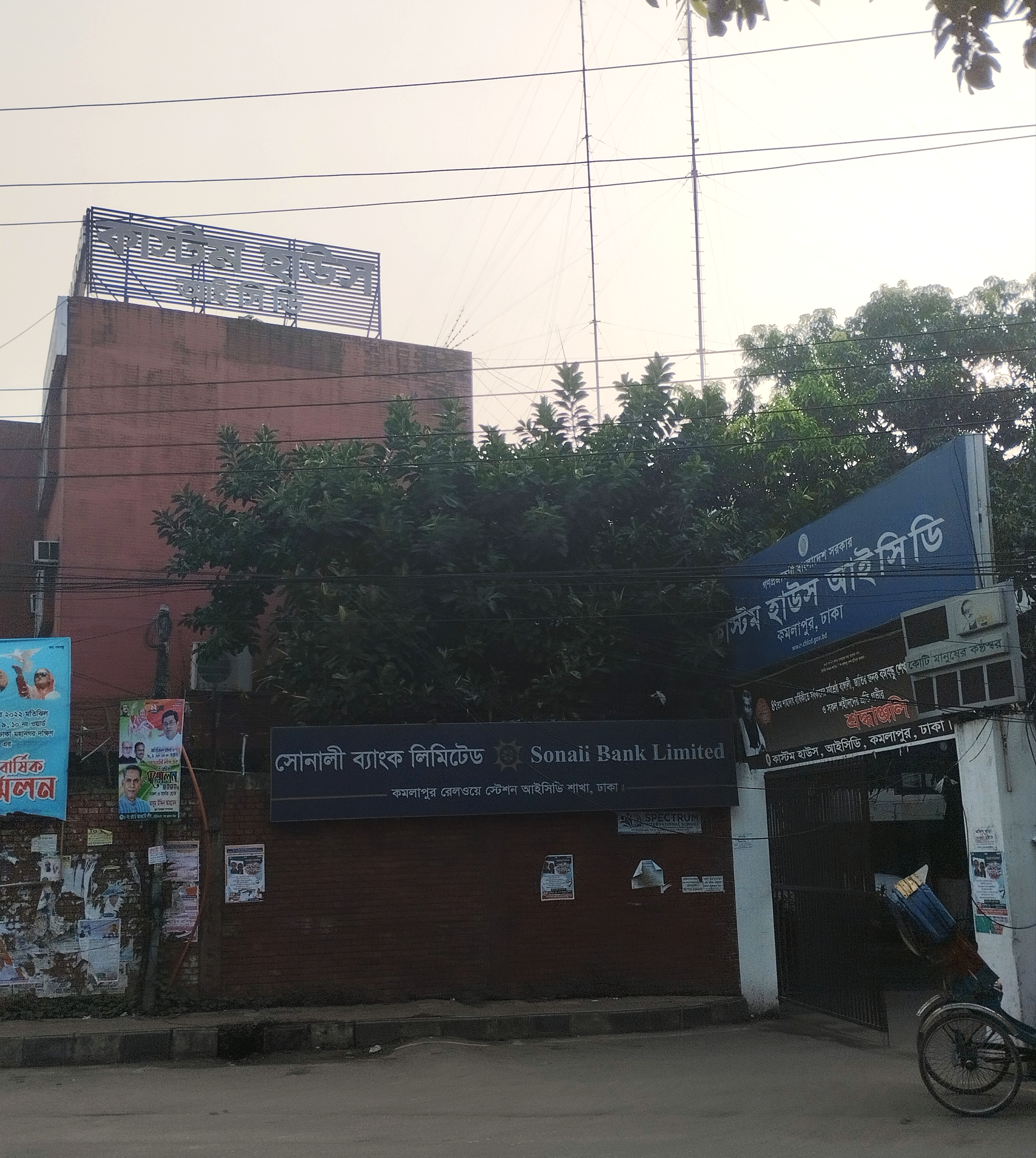
- Customs house
- Headquarters: Dhaka, Bangladesh
- Region served: Bangladesh
- Official language: Bengali
- Website: Dhaka Custom House

Dhaka Custom House (Bengali: ঢাকা কাস্টম হাউস) is a Bangladesh government regulatory agency under the Ministry of Finance responsible for enforcing tariffs and customs on shipments in Dhaka. It is the largest airport customs house in Bangladesh.

== History ==
The East India Company in 1810 reorganized Bengal's age old system of internal duties levied on the passage of goods. The numerous customs houses in Bengal were consolidated into six: Calcutta, Murshidabad, Hughli, Dhaka, Chittagong, and Balassore.

Dhaka Custom House systems were automated with the support of Dhaka Chamber of Commerce and Industry as part of public–private partnership. The custom house routinely recovers large quantity of gold being smuggled through Dhaka airport.

== See also ==
- Benapole Custom House
- Chittagong Custom House
- Mongla Custom House
