= Physically Disabled Protection Trust =

- Formation: 1990
- Headquarters: Station Road, Tongi, Gazipur, Bangladesh
- Region served: Bangladesh
- Official language: Bengali
- Website: spst.gov.bd

The Physically Disabled Protection Trust (Bengali: শারীরিক প্রতিবন্ধী সুরক্ষা ট্রাস্ট) is a government trust under the Ministry of Social Welfare. It is located in Tongi, Gazipur, Bangladesh. Under this trust, bottled water "Mukta" and plastic products "Maitree" are produced and marketed. Most of the officers/ employees involved in this production and marketing process are disabled.
