= American Institute of Bangladesh Studies =

Education organization in Dhaka, Bangladesh

- Formation: 1989
- Headquarters: United States
- Region served: Bangladesh
- Official language: English
- Website: aibs.net

American Institute of Bangladesh Studies is a United States-based think tank and research institute, studying Bangladesh -related topics. It provides funding to scholars and students who are conducting research on Bangladesh.

== History ==
American Institute of Bangladesh Studies was founded in 1989 by Professor Craig Baxter of Juniata College. Its founding was supported by professors from The Columbia University, The Glassboro State College, The Pennsylvania State University, The University of Chicago, The University of Pennsylvania, and The University of Wisconsin.

The institute signed an agreement with the government of Bangladesh, through which the government of Bangladesh provided financial aid to scholars studying Bangladesh related topics. From 1991 to 1992, the institute signed an agreement with The United States Information Agency to encourage educational exchanges between Bangladesh and the United States. In 1993, the institute joined the Council of American Overseas Research Centers.

Craig Baxter served as the president of the institute from 1989 to 1998. It was one of the supporters of the Bangladesh in the 21st Century conference in The Harvard University in 2008. President of the Institute Shelly Feldman, also a professor at The Cornell University, was a moderator of a conference titled "Water, waves and weather: Climate change and the future of South Asia in Dhaka", Bangladesh on 20 June 2011. AIBS has signed MOU with The University of Dhaka, The Bangladesh University of Engineering and Technology and The Shahjalal University of Science and Technology.
