= Bangladesh Oceanographic Research Institute =

Research institute in Bangladesh

- Formation: 16 January 2018
- Headquarters: Cox’s Bazar, Bangladesh
- Region served: Bangladesh
- Official language: Bengali
- Website: www.bori.gov.bd

Bangladesh Oceanographic Research Institute (Bengali: বাংলাদেশ ওশানোগ্রাফিক রিসার্চ ইনস্টিটিউট) is a Bangladesh government research institute under the Ministry of Science and Technology that engages in oceanographic research.

== History ==
Bangladesh Oceanographic Research Institute was established in 2015 after the passage in parliament of the Bangladesh Oceanographic Research Institute Act, 2015.
