= Coal Power Generation Company Bangladesh Limited =

Bangladesh government owned energy company

- Formation: 2011
- Headquarters: Dhaka, Bangladesh
- Region served: Bangladesh
- Official language: Bengali
- Website: www.cpgcbl.gov.bd

Coal Power Generation Company Bangladesh Limited (Bengali: কোল পাওয়ার জেনারেশন কোম্পানী বাংলাদেশ লিমিটেড) is a Bangladesh government owned energy company. The purpose of the company is to increase the electricity generated from burning coal. Md. Nazmul Haque is the Managing Director of the company.

== History ==
Coal Power Generation Company Bangladesh Limited was established on 5 September 2011 by the Government of Bangladesh under the 1994 Companies Act to increase coal-generated electricity and reduce dependence on natural gas for power generation. The company established Matarbari Power Plant and Maheshkhali Power Plant. It is a subsidiary of Bangladesh Power Development Board. There have been significant delays in the construction of Matarbari Power Plant.
