= Disaster Management Directorate =

Bangladeshi governmental directorate

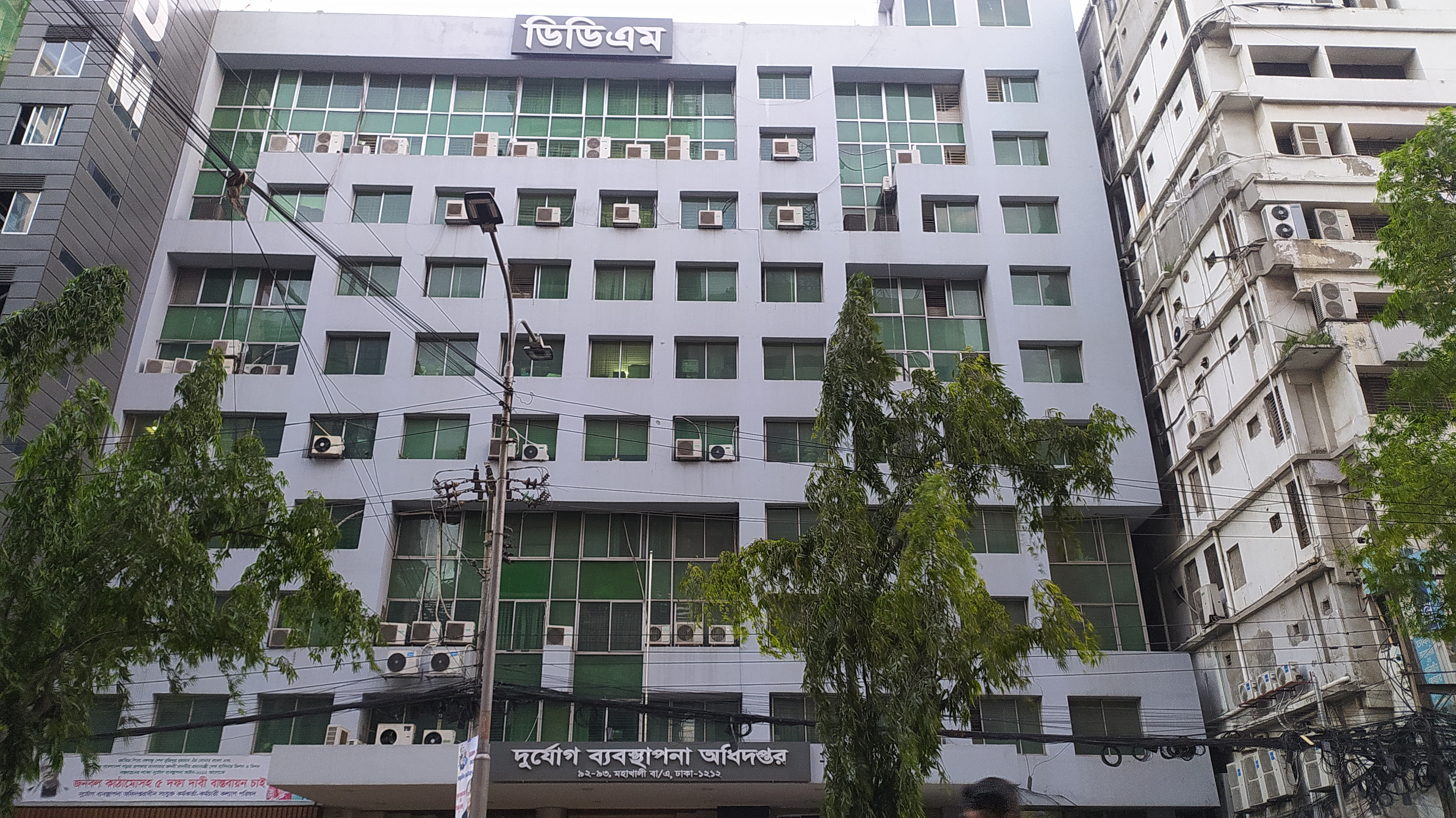
- Disaster Management Directorate Mohakhali
- Formation: 2012
- Headquarters: Dhaka, Bangladesh
- Region served: Bangladesh
- Official language: Bengali
- Director General: MD. Mijanur Rahman
- Website: Disaster Management Directorate

Disaster Management Directorate is a department of the Ministry of Disaster Management and Relief and responsible for government management of natural disasters in Bangladesh and is located in Dhaka, Bangladesh.

== History ==
Disaster Management Directorate was founded in 2012 by the Bangladesh Awami League led government in 2012. The directorate was formed through the passage of Disaster Management Act, 2012 in the Parliament of Bangladesh.
