= Development Assistance for Special Area (except CHT) =

- Formation: 1996
- Headquarters: Dhaka, Bangladesh
- Region served: Bangladesh
- Official language: Bengali
- Website: pmo.gov.bd/site/page/0c0d429d-1c42-4a82-905b-aaccf429d192/Development-Assistance-for-Special-Area-(except-CHT)

Development Assistance for Special Area (except CHT) (Bengali: বিশেষ এলাকার জন্য উন্নয়ন সহায়তা (পার্বত্য চট্টগ্রাম ব্যতীত)) is a Bangladesh government development program under the Prime Minister's Office for special areas containing ethnic minorities in Bangladesh excluding the Chittagong Hill Tracts.

== History ==
Development Assistance for Special Area (except CHT) was established in 1996. There are 54 indigenous groups in Bangladesh aside from the majority Bengali people.

The Daily Star reported in July 2020 only 17.1 million out of 500 million taka allocated for the Development Assistance for Special Area (except CHT) project was spent. The report also noted that project funds were spent in Tungipara Upazila and Kotalipara Upazila in Gopalganj District, Faridpur Sadar Upazila in Faridpur District, Rajbari Sadar Upazila, Kalukhali Upazila, Baliakandi Upazila, and Pangsha Upazila in Rajbari District, Sakhipur Upazila in Tangail District, and Pakundia Upazila in Kishoreganj District. These areas do not have large indigenous populations and as a result most of the funds went to Bengali people.

As part of Mujib Borsho (the birth centenary of Sheikh Mujibur Rahman) celebrations in 2020, the Development Assistance for Special Area (except CHT) gave 3,554 houses, 2,672 bicycles, and 15,000 scholarships to indigenous people.
