= Small Farmer Development Foundation =

Small Farmer Development Foundation (SFDF)
- Formation: 1975
- Type: Government organisation
- Headquarters: Palli Bhaban, Dhaka, Bangladesh
- Region served: Bangladesh
- Official language: Bengali
- Managing Director: Md Zakir Hossain Akanda (Fmr. Planning Secretary)
- Parent organization: Ministry of Local Government, Rural Development & Cooperatives Division (LGRD&C), Government of Bangladesh
- Website: www.sfdf.org.bd

Small Farmer Development Foundation (ক্ষুদ্র কৃষক উন্নয়ন ফাউন্ডেশন) is a government foundation of Ministry of Local Government, Rural Development & Cooperatives of Bangladesh that is responsible for the welfare of small-scale farms and farmers. The current Managing Director of the organisation is Md Zakir Hossain Akanda. He is a former Secretary to the Government and Member of Planning Commission, Ministry of Planning. It is the pioneering organisation in Bangladesh to provide collateral free micro loans to small farmers in Bangladesh.

== History ==
Small Farmer Development Foundation traces its origins to the Small Farmers and Landless Work Development Project, an experimental project of Bangladesh Academy for Rural Development. The project ran from 1975 to 1976 in Bogra District, Comilla District, and Mymensingh District. In July 1988 the project was expanded to Patuakhali District and Barguna District. The first part of the project completed in 1991.

The second phase continued from 1991 to 1996 and included Barisal District and Bhola District. The third phase of the project ran from 1998 to 2004. Later on the project was transformed into a separate legal foundation under the Article 28 of the Companies Act of 1994 to continue its work.
