= Nuclear Power Plant Company Bangladesh Limited =

- Formation: 2015
- Headquarters: Dhaka, Bangladesh
- Region served: Bangladesh
- Official language: Bengali
- Website: npcbl.portal.gov.bd

Nuclear Power Plant Company Bangladesh Limited (Bengali: নিউক্লিয়ার পাওয়ার প্ল্যান্ট কোম্পানী বাংলাদেশ লিমিটেড) is a Bangladesh government owned company nuclear energy company responsible for building and operating nuclear power plants in Bangladesh.

== History ==
Nuclear Power Plant Company Bangladesh Limited was established in September 2015 after the passage of Nuclear Power Plant Bill by the Parliament of Bangladesh. The bill was placed by Science and Technology Minister Yafes Osman. The parliament vote also removed amendments inserted by the opposition party.

Nuclear Power Plant Company Bangladesh Limited is a concern of the Bangladesh Atomic Energy Commission. It is responsible for the management of Rooppur Nuclear Power Plant.
