= Department of Bangladesh Haor and Wetland Development =

Bangladeshi government board

Department of Bangladesh Haor And Wetland Development
- Formation: 2000 (as Bangladesh Haor and Wetland Development Board); 2016 (as Department)
- Headquarters: Faridpur, Bangladesh
- Region served: Bangladesh
- Official language: Bengali
- Website: dbhwd.gov.bd

The Department of Bangladesh Haor And Wetland Development is a government department that is responsible for the management and regulation of Wetlands and haors in Bangladesh and is located in Dhaka, Bangladesh.

== History ==
The Government of Bangladesh passed an ordinance which formed the Haor Development Board on 22 February 1977. On 11 September 2000 it was reconstituted to form the Bangladesh Haor and Wetland Development Board by presidential order. Later in July 2016 it was reconstituted as the Department of Bangladesh Haor And Wetland Development by the government of Bangladesh.
