= Housing and Building Research Institute =

Government agency of Bangladesh

Housing and Building Research Institute (HBRI)
- Formation: 1960
- Headquarters: Dhaka, Bangladesh
- Region served: Bangladesh
- Official language: Bengali
- Website: Housing and Building Research Institute

Housing and Building Research Institute (HBRI) is an autonomous organization under Government of Bangladesh Ministry of Housing and Public Works.

== History ==
The institute was established through the Housing and Building Research Institutes Act 2016.

== Institutional structure ==
The institute has a total of 153 personnel including 33 qualified research personnel. All activities including the R & D programme are now being executed through the following Divisions and Sections:

=== Divisions ===
- Structural Engineering and Construction Division
- Building Materials Division
- Soil Mechanics and Foundation Engineering Division
- Housing Division

=== Sections ===
- Extension and Dissemination Wing
- Information and Documentation Section
- Administrative & Accounts Section
- Training Cell
