= Ministry of Disaster Management and Relief =

Government ministry of Bangladesh

- Bengali: দুর্যোগ ব্যবস্থাপনা ও ত্রাণ মন্ত্রণালয়
- Government Seal of Bangladesh

Ministry overview
- Formed: 12 January 1972; 54 years ago
- Jurisdiction: Government of Bangladesh
- Headquarters: Bangladesh Secretariat, Dhaka
- Annual budget: ৳10350 crore (US$840 million) (2026-2027)
- Minister responsible: Asadul Habib Dulu
- Minister of State responsible: M. Iqbal Hossain
- Ministry executives: Md. Saidur Rahman Khan, Secretary
- Child agencies: Cyclone Preparedness Programme; Disaster Management Directorate
- Website: www.modmr.gov.bd

The Ministry of Disaster Management and Relief (Bengali: দুর্যোগ ব্যবস্থাপনা ও ত্রাণ মন্ত্রণালয়) is a ministry of the government of Bangladesh, responsible for disaster management and relief.

== History ==
After the independence of Bangladesh, two separate ministries namely Ministry of Relief and Rehabilitation and Ministry of Food were formed in 1972. In 1982, the two ministries were merged into two departments under the Ministry of Food; namely - the Food Department and the Relief and Rehabilitation Department. Later, in 1988, the Department of Relief and Rehabilitation was renamed as Ministry of Relief. But this was reversed, when in 2004, the Ministry of Disaster Management and Relief and the Ministry of Food were merged to form the Ministry of Food and Disaster Management. Finally, in 2012, the Department of Disaster Management and Relief was again transformed into the Ministry of Disaster Management and Relief.

== Directorate ==
- Cyclone Preparedness Programme (CPP)
- Disaster Management Directorate
