= Small and Medium Enterprise Foundation =

Bangladeshi state-owned organization

- Abbreviation: SMEF
- Formation: 2007
- Type: Government
- Legal status: Autonomous Organization established by the Ministry of Industries, Government of the People's Republic of Bangladesh.
- Headquarters: Dhaka, Bangladesh
- Location: E-5 C/1, Agargaon Administrative Area, Dhaka-1207.
- Region served: Bangladesh
- Official language: Bengali and English
- Parent organization: Ministry of Industries, Government of the People's Republic of Bangladesh.
- Website: smef.gov.bd

Small and Medium Enterprise Foundation(SMEF) (Bengali: ক্ষুদ্র ও মাঝারি শিল্প ফাউন্ডেশন (এসএমইএফ)) is a Bangladesh government owned organization that provides training and financing to small entrepreneurs. The foundation is a non-profit organization that involves the both government and small medium enterprise industry trade bodies. Md. Mushfiqur Rahman is the chairman of the Small and Medium Enterprise Foundation.

== History ==
Small and Medium Enterprise Foundation was established in 2007 with an initial fund of 2 billion taka. It was created under the Companies Act and is guaranteed by the Ministry of Commerce. It provides training for small entrepreneurs and provides them with low cost financing.
