= Cotton Development Board =

Government agency of Bangladesh

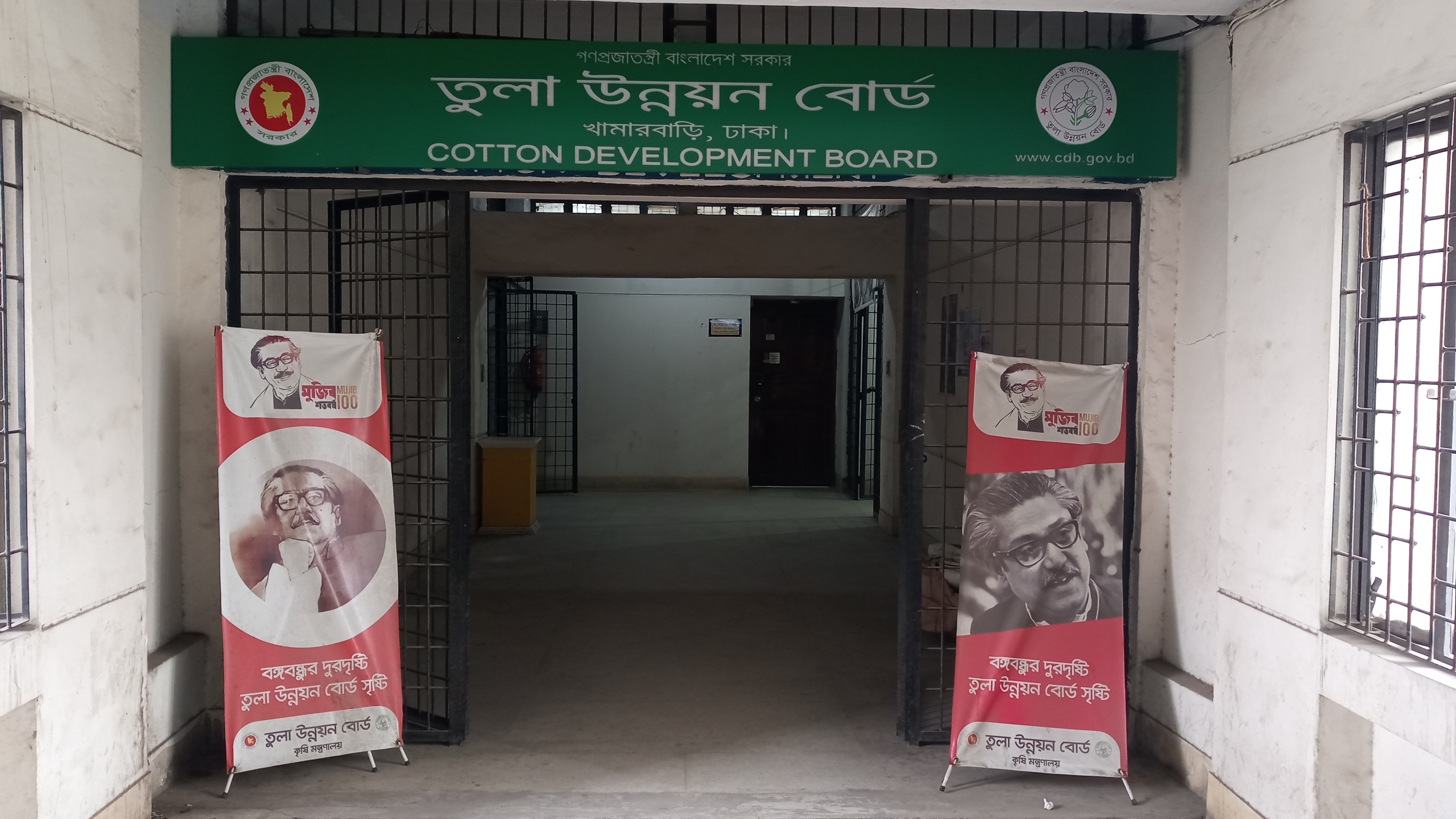
- Formation: 1972
- Headquarters: Dhaka, Bangladesh
- Region served: Bangladesh
- Official language: Bengali
- Website: www.cdb.gov.bd

Cotton Development Board or CDB is a government organization responsible for the cotton production and research in Bangladesh, is located in Dhaka, Bangladesh.

== History ==
Bangladesh has a glorious history of cotton and textile production. In the Middle Ages Bengal was famous for its finest fiber called “Muslin”. The cotton required for making Muslin sarees was cultivated in the highlands around Dhaka where most of the weaving industry developed. In fact, the production and trade of Muslin gradually declined during the British ruling period. As a result, mills closed down in the early nineteenth century. Efforts to produce cotton in this country were very limited during the rule of Pakistan. Before independence, raw materials for local textile mills were supplied from West Pakistan. After the independence of Bangladesh in 1971, when Pakistan stopped supplying raw materials, the importance of local cotton production was felt. At that time our textile industries were facing serious problems due to lack of raw materials. In this situation, the Cotton Development Board was founded by the Father of the Nation Bangabandhu Sheikh Mujibur Rahman in 1972 under the Ministry of Agriculture to expand cotton cultivation in the country. The Cotton Development Board started field cotton experimental cultivation with American Upland cotton in 1974-75. Cotton cultivation started on a large scale in the country in 1986 with the introduction of new cotton varieties from America. In 1991, the responsibility of cotton research was transferred from Bangladesh Agricultural Research Institute to the Cotton Development Board. At present Cotton Development Board is carrying out cotton research and extension work.
