= Mailing Operator and Courier Services Licensing Authority =

- Formation: 2014
- Headquarters: Dhaka, Bangladesh
- Region served: Bangladesh
- Official language: Bengali

Mailing Operator and Courier Services Licensing Authority (Bengali: মেইলিং অপারেটর ও কুরিয়ার সার্ভিস লাইসেন্সিং কর্তৃপক্ষ) is a Bangladesh government regulatory agency responsible for regulating mail and courier services in Bangladesh. It is under the Ministry of Posts, Telecommunications and Information Technology.

== History ==
The government of Bangladesh passed Mailing Operator and Courier Service Rules on 11 November 2013. Mailing Operator and Courier Services Licensing Authority was established in February 2014 with Dileep Kumar Das as its chairperson.

In December 2020, 75 out of 1000 courier operators had taken a license from the Mailing Operator and Courier Services Licensing Authority and only half the members of Courier Service Association of Bangladesh had taken license from the authority.
