= Rupantarita Prakritik Gas Company Limited =

Gas company

Rupantarita Prakritik Gas Company Limited (RPGCL)
- Formation: 1 January 1987
- Headquarters: Dhaka, Bangladesh
- Region served: Bangladesh
- Official language: Bengali
- Website: www.rpgcl.org.bd

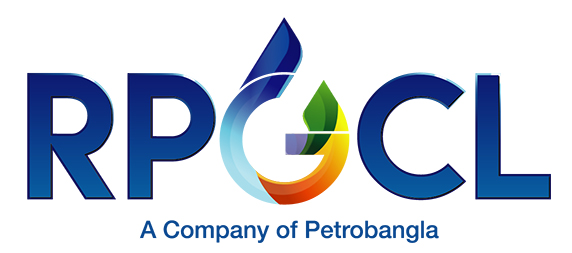
RPGCL

Rupantarita Prakritik Gas Company Limited, also known as RPGCL, is a government owned company in Bangladesh. RPGCL is the forerunner in encouraging the use of Compressed Natural Gas (CNG) as an alternate fuel in the transport sector. People were encouraged to use CNG as a fuel in order to improve the environmental pollution. RPGCL played the positive role in building the CNG fuel based infrastructure in the transport sector of the country and thereby supervising, monitoring and expanding its commercial operation. NGL-Condensate, which are the by products of natural gas produced from Sylhet Gas Fields, are being processed by RPGCL to produce MS, Diesel and LPG and marketing of the same. Ashuganj Condenate Handling Installation Site (ACHIS) supplies Condensate to the Govt. enterprise, Eastern Refinery Limited (ERL) as well as to the private sector using the Vessels. Liquefied Natural Gas (LNG) based activities is an added function, being operated by RPGCL

== History ==
An entity named ‘Compressed Natural Gas Company Ltd’ was formed on 1 January 1987 with a view to ensure multi-dimensional use of natural gas, which is a valuable resource of the country by resorting to alternate sources of fuel for preventing air pollution, saving foreign exchange through reduction of import of fuel. Later, due to expansion of its activities, the name of the Company was changed to ‘Rupantarita Prakritik Gas Company Limited (RPGCL)’ on 9 February 1991.
