= Forestry Science and Technology Institute, Chittagong =

Bangladeshi research institute

Forestry Science and Technology Institute
- Formation: 1994
- Headquarters: Chittagong, Bangladesh
- Region served: Bangladesh
- Official language: Bengali
- Website: https://fsti.chittagong.gov.bd/

Forestry Science and Technology Institute (Bengali: বনবিদ্যা বিজ্ঞান ও প্রযুক্তি ইনস্টিটিউট) is a Bangladesh government owned forestry educational institute in Chittagong. It is the only institute in Bangladesh that offers a four-year diploma in forestry.

There are two other forestry institutes in Bangladesh, Forestry Science and Technology Institute, Rajshahi and Forestry Science and Technology Institute, Sylhet.

== History ==
Forestry Science and Technology Institute was established in 1994 in Chittagong with financial support from World Bank and United Nations Development Programme. It was originally called Bangladesh Forest College. it is under the Bangladesh Technical Education Board and run by Bangladesh Forest Department. It is a residential institute. The institute had 10 teachers at the beginning but the number was reduced to three after funding shortages. The institute takes in 50 students per year.

== Controversies ==
On 13 August 2020, a 14th batch student of the college, Yosuf Ali, was killed while serving in the Forest Department. He was killed while trying prevent illegal land grabbing and logging.
