= Cyclone Preparedness Programme =

Bangladeshi government programme

- Formation: 1973
- Headquarters: Dhaka, Bangladesh
- Region served: Bangladesh
- Official language: Bengali
- Website: http://www.cpp.gov.bd/

Cyclone Preparedness Programme is a disaster management program of the Government and Bangladesh Red Crescent Society in Bangladesh and is located in Dhaka, Bangladesh. The program is under the management of the Ministry of Disaster Management and Relief.

== History ==
The program was developed to work as an early warning system in coastal Bangladesh in 1973 by President Sheikh Mujibur Rahman. The program has been credited with saving thousands of lives. The Indian Prime Minister, Narendra Modi, called it "Global Best Practice". It has 55 thousand volunteers.
