= Chittagong Custom House =

Bangladesh government regulatory agency

Chattogram Custom House
- চট্টগ্রাম কাস্টম হাউস
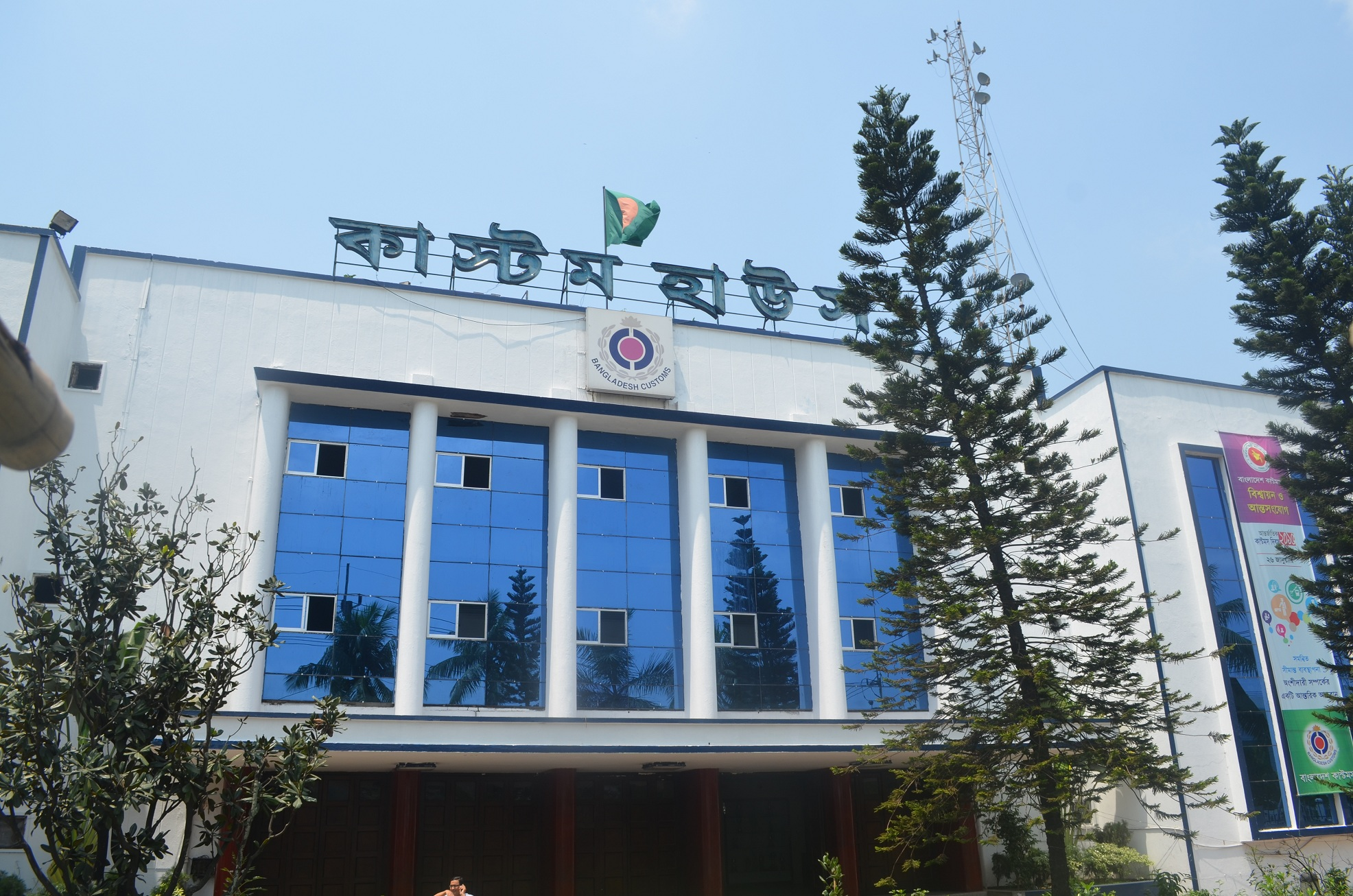
- Formation: 1440
- Headquarters: Chattogram, Bangladesh
- Region served: Bangladesh
- Official language: Bengali
- Website: Chittagong Custom House

Chattogram Custom House (Bengali: চট্টগ্রাম কাস্টম হাউস) is a Bangladesh government regulatory agency under the Ministry of Finance responsible for collecting tariffs and costume duty in Chittagong City and Chittagong Port.

== History ==
Chittagong Custom House was established by the Portuguese following the signing of a treaty with Mahmud Shah of Bengal in 1440. Records from 1776 to 1780, mention collection of tariffs from Chittagong Custom House to be minor. In 1801, rules were passed to govern Chittagong Custom House. In 1853, it was one of two custom house managed by the British Raj in the region. Chittagong Custom House was managed by a deputy collector during British Colonial rule while the collector was stationed in Kolkata. It received its first collector in 1948 following the partition of India. In 1975 the post of collector post was changed to costume commissioner. The current building of the Chittagong Custom House was built in 1920. In 2008, Chittagong Custom house automated operations.

== Criticism ==
The custom house hired SGS S.A. to scan containers and train custom officers on how to scan them. The process failed as trained custom officers were transferred to other postings in Bangladesh and the contract ended in 2015. The custom department then awarded the contract to a local firm, Five R Associates, for 288.6 million taka for a two-year period. This was criticised because a custom house internal report estimated that the custom house could do the scanning for 40 million taka.

== See also ==
- Benapole Custom House
- Dhaka Custom House
- Mongla Custom House
