= Department of Railway Inspection =

Bangladeshi regulatory agency

- Abbreviation: DRI
- Formation: 1890
- Legal status: Attached department of the Ministry of Railway
- Purpose: To ensure passenger safety and comfort
- Headquarters: Fulbaria, Dhaka Bangladesh
- Region served: Bangladesh
- Official language: Bengali
- Government Inspector of Bangladesh Railway (GIBR): Farid Ahmed. Joined on 14th October 2024
- Website: dri.portal.gov.bd

Department of Railway Inspection (Bengali: রেলপথ পরিদর্শন অধিদপ্তর) is a Bangladesh government regulatory agency under the Ministry of Railways responsible for railway safety and rail inspection. The department is responsible for inspecting railway lines and infrastructure in Bangladesh.

== History ==
Department of Railway Inspection was established in 1890 by the British Raj. The department is responsible for the inspection of raillines and infrastructure in Bangladesh. It is also the lead investigation agencies for major train accidents.

In October 2020 Ashim Kumar Talukdar, Railway inspector, visited railway lines in Dhaka and Chittagong to inspect the installation of digital signals.
