= Palli Daridro Bimochon Foundation =

Bangladeshi government foundation

- Formation: 1999
- Headquarters: Dhaka, Bangladesh
- Region served: Bangladesh
- Official language: Bengali
- Website: www.pdbf.gov.bd

The Palli Daridro Bimochon Foundation (Bengali: পল্লী দারিদ্র্য বিমোচন ফাউন্ডেশন) is a Bangladeshi government foundation. It was established in 1999 in a law passed by the national parliament of Bangladesh with the goal of eradicating poverty. As of 2024, the chairman of the foundation is Rezaul Ahsan.

== History ==
Palli Daridro Bimochon Foundation (PDBF), or Foundation for the Elimination of Rural Poverty, was established in 1999 by the Parliament of Bangladesh. It is a statutory, non-profit organization committed to promoting the economic and social advancement of society's poorest members.

The foundation functions as a micro-finance institution (MFI) with the goal of delivering cost-effective, micro-finance services to indigent rural clients.

PDBF's first projects were the rural development projects RD-2 RPP and RD-12, and the rural finance program. Since 1984, the Bangladesh Rural Development Board (BRDB) has administered these projects with financial and technical assistance from the Canadian International Development Agency (CIDA). These early public welfare programs were the first to be transformed into an autonomous permanent organization called the Rural Poverty Alleviation Foundation (RPAF).

The micro-finance movement has shown that when financial services are available, a rich market economy can exist among the poor. The poor are an active group in any economy, and PDBF has shown that businesses can also benefit when the needs of the poor are met. In addition to providing micro-credit, PDBF operates micro-enterprise loans.

== Donors ==
According to a 2003 analysis conducted by CIDA, PDBF's only donor is the Asia branch of the CIDA.

== Controversy ==
In 2014, the managing director of the foundation, Mahbubur Rahman, was interrogated by Bangladesh Anti Corruption Commission over allegations of graft in the foundation's solar energy project. Allegations of corruption dogged the foundation's distribution of small loans.
