= Land Administration Training Centre =

- Formation: 1997
- Headquarters: Dhaka, Bangladesh
- Region served: Bangladesh
- Official language: Bengali

The Land Administration Training Centre is a government training academy under the Ministry of Land responsible for training land administration officers of the Bangladesh Civil Service. It is located in Katabon, Dhaka, Bangladesh.

== History ==
The Land Administration Training Centre was established in 1997 by the government of Bangladesh to train land officers of the Bangladesh Civil Service.
