= Health Engineering Department =

Bangladeshi government agency

Health Engineering Department(HED)
- Formation: 1991
- Headquarters: Dhaka, Bangladesh
- Region served: Bangladesh
- Official language: Bengali
- Website: hed.gov.bd

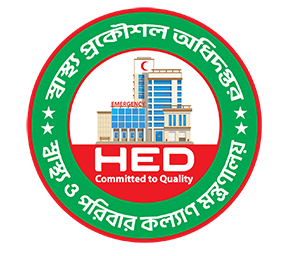

The Health Engineering Department (Bengali: স্বাস্থ্য প্রকৌশল অধিদপ্তর) is a Bangladesh government regulatory agency under the Ministry of Health and Family Welfare responsible for the construction of government and public health facilities. As of March 2026, Brigadier General Mir Sarwar Hossain Chowdhury is the chief engineer of the department.

== History ==
The Health Engineering Department was established in 1991 to build healthcare facilities, clinics, and hospitals.
