= Ashrayan Project =

Government agency of Bangladesh

- Formation: 1997
- Headquarters: Dhaka, Bangladesh
- Region served: Bangladesh
- Official language: Bengali
- Website: Ashrayan Project

The Ashrayan Project (Bengali: আশ্রয়ণ প্রকল্প), also known as the Ashrayan-2 Project, is a development project funded by the Government of Bangladesh under the auspices of the Prime Minister's Office to build homes for homeless and displaced people. Joint Secretary Md. Mahbub Hossain is the head of the project.

== History ==
The Ashrayan Project was established in 1997 by the Bangladesh Awami League government to be responsible for building homes for the homeless. In 2018, the project announced plans to complete 139 multilevel buildings in Cox's Bazar for 250-thousand homeless families by 2019. The buildings were to be constructed by the Armed Forces Division. In Naldanga Upazila, the project recipients alleged that the local Union Member and Bangladesh Jubo League members were asking families for bribes to ensure enrollment in the project.

=== Ashrayan-3 ===
The government announced an expansion of the project, Ashrayan-3, to build 100-thousand homes for Rohingya refugees in Bangladesh in Bhasan Char, Hatiya Upazila, Noakhali District. In January 2020 the project was moving forward despite opposition from Rohingya leaders and human rights groups. Bangladesh's minister for refugee affairs stated the island is “ready for habitation,” though he gave no timetable for the relocation. The government has not permitted foreign journalists or Rohingya leaders to travel to Bhasan Char. The island is less than 20 years old, and some think there is no guarantee that it will not disappear in the next monsoon.
