= Benapole Custom House =

Bangladesh government regulatory agency

- বেনাপোল কাস্টম হাউস
- Formation: 1947; 79 years ago
- Headquarters: Jessore, Bangladesh
- Region served: Bangladesh
- Official language: Bengali

Benapole Custom House (Bengali: বেনাপোল কাস্টম হাউস) is a Bangladesh government regulatory agency under the Ministry of Finance responsible for collecting tariffs and customs duty in Benapole town, Jessore city and Benapole Port.

== History ==
After the partition of India in 1947, the journey of Benapole Custom Station began to expand trade within the East and West Bengal as well as rest of India. It starts as Benapole sub-custom house under East Pakistan Customs. After the independence of Bangladesh, In 1972 the Mongla sub-custom house and Benapole sub-custom house jointly founded the Mongla Custom House by the President's Order No. 62 of 1972 in Bangladesh is known as The Bangladesh Taxation Laws (Adaptation) Order, 1972. And started to operates as a sub-custom house under the Mongla Custom House.

And it was converted into a full-fledged custom house in 1997. It is used by the Bangladesh Land Port Authority to complete ninety percent of the land trade. The amount of which stood at US$5.27 billion (৳647 billion taka) in the fiscal year 2022–2023.

== See also ==
- Chittagong Custom House
- Dhaka Custom House
