= Bangladesh Hi-Tech Park Authority =

Bangladesh Hi-tech Park Authority
- Emblem of Bangladesh Hi-Tech Park Authority
- Formation: 2010; 16 years ago
- Type: Autonomous-Government Organisation
- Coordinates: 23.7788°N 90.3745°E
- Website: bhtpa.gov.bd

Bangladesh Hi-Tech Park Authority (BHTPA) is a government agency in Bangladesh dedicated to establishing, managing and operating technology business parks throughout the country.

== History ==
Formed in 2010, BHTPA is now implementing the projects including Kaliakoir Hi–Tech Park in Gazipur District and Jessore Software Technology Park. Planned projects include Mohakhali IT Village in Dhaka, Barendra Silicon City in Paba Upazila of Rajshahi District, and Sylhet Electronic City in Companiganj Upazila, Sylhet. BHTPA is also approving private hi-tech park to be implemented by private companies. Thus far, 39 hi-tech parks have been under constructions and approved for construction by BHTPA in different regions in Bangladesh.

== List of Hi-Tech Parks in Bangladesh ==
The following is a list of operating, approved, and under-construction software business parks in the country.

=== In Operation ===
	Name	Location
1.	Kaliakoir Hi–Tech Park	Kaliakair
2.	Jashore Software Technology Park	Jessore
3.	Janata Tower Software Technology Park	Dhaka
4.	Natore IT Training & Incubation Center	Natore
5.	Sylhet Hi-Tech Park	Sylhet
6.	Chittagong Software Technology Park	Chittagong
7.	CUET IT Training and Incubation Center, CUET	Chittagong
8.	KUET IT Training and Incubation Center, KUET	Khulna
9.	Hi-Tech Park, Rajshahi	Rajshahi

=== Under construction ===
	Name	Location
1.	City Hi-Tech Park	Demra
2.	Rangpur Hi-Tech Park	Rangpur
3.	Khulna Hi-Tech Park	Khulna
4.	Magura Training & Incubation Center	Magura
5.	Mohakhali IT Village	Dhaka
6.	Barendra Silicon City	Rajshahi
7.	Madaripur Institute of Frontier Technology (MIFT)	Madaripur

=== Approved ===
	Name	Location
1.	Mymensingh Hi-Tech Park	Mymensingh
2.	Natore Hi-Tech Park	Natore
3.	Jamalpur Hi-Tech Park	Jamalpur
4.	Keraniganj Hi-Tech Park	Keraniganj
5.	Comilla Hi-Tech Park	Comilla
6.	Barisal Hi-Tech Park	Barisal
7.	Cox's Bazar Hi-Tech Park	Cox's Bazar
8.	Gopalganj Hi-Tech Park	Gopalganj
