= Toshakhana (Bangladesh) =

Specialized treasury for gifts in Bangladesh

- Formation: 1971; 55 years ago
- Headquarters: Dhaka, Bangladesh
- Region served: Bangladesh
- Official language: Bengali
- Website: bangabhaban.portal.gov.bd

Toshakhana (Bengali: তোষাখানা, romanized: Tōṣākhānā) is a specialized treasury for gifts received by the President and Prime Minister of Bangladesh. The gifts are considered property of the state and are stored in Toshakhana which is part of the Presidential palace, Bangabhaban. Several of the items of the Toshkhana are stored at the National museum and Toshakhana Museum, which was built in 2018.

== History ==
Toshakhana is a Sanskrit/Persian word for treasury/treasure house. During the British rule of India, East India Trading Company officials would deposit gift they received from local princes and other dignitaries in the company Toshakhana. The Bangladeshi Toshakhana is located at the Presidential palace, Bangabhaban. The treasury includes a flag of Bangladesh that was taken to the Moon and a sample of Moon rock. There are more than one thousand artifacts and 250 artifacts were donated to the Bangladesh National Museum. The Toshkhana is managed by the Cabinet Division.

=== Museum ===
In 15 November 2018, Prime Minister Sheikh Hasina inaugurated Toshkhana museum at Bijoy Sharani road beside the Bangladesh Military Museum. Prime Minister Sheikh Hasina said that during the Bangladesh Nationalist government term several gifts were destroyed because they had her name and the boat symbol; the museum will held preserve the gifts which are property of the state. The museum is five storeys and was built by the Bangladesh Army.
