= National Skills Development Authority =

Bangladeshi agency

- জাতীয় দক্ষতা উন্নয়ন কর্তৃপক্ষ
- Logo of the NSDA

Agency overview
- Formed: 16 January 2019; 7 years ago
- Jurisdiction: Government of Bangladesh
- Headquarters: NSDA Building, Dhaka, Bangladesh
- Agency executives: Tarique Rahman (Prime Minister), Chairman; Dr. Nazneen Kawshar Chowdhury, Executive Chairman (Secretary)
- Parent agency: Prime Minister's Office
- Website: nsda.gov.bd

The National Skills Development Authority (NSDA) (Bengali: জাতীয় দক্ষতা উন্নয়ন কর্তৃপক্ষ) is a Bangladesh government agency under the Prime Minister's Office responsible for developing policies to build a skilled labour force. The authority must approve and evaluate all skill development projects of the government. The chairman of the governing body of the National Skills Development Authority is Prime Minister Tarique Rahman

== History ==
In 2008, the government of Bangladesh formed the National Skills Development Council under the Ministry of Labour and Employment. On 16 January 2019, the Bangladeshi government dismantled the National Skills Development Council and formed the National Skills Development Authority. The authority was formed under the National Skills Development Authority Act-2018, which was passed through the parliament. The authority is headed by a chairman with the rank of secretary. The authority also inherited all the obligations, contracts, and liabilities of the National Skills Development Council.
