= Department of Livestock Services =

Government department of Bangladesh

- Formation: 1795
- Headquarters: Pasusampad Bhaban
- Location: Krishi Khamar Sarak, Dhaka, Bangladesh
- Region served: Bangladesh
- Official language: Bengali
- Website: www.dls.gov.bd

Department of Livestock Services (Bengali: প্রাণিসম্পদ অধিদপ্তর) is a Bangladesh government department under the Ministry of Fisheries and Livestock responsible for Livestock industry in Bangladesh. Dr.Mohammad Reajul Haque is the Director General of the Department of Livestock.

== History ==
Department of Livestock traces its origin to a veterinary unit formed for the British Cavalry during the colonial era in 1795. In 1883, it became the Civil Veterinary Department formed by the British Raj. It was headquartered in Kolkata but was moved to Comilla in 1947. After the Partition of India, it was renamed to Directorate of Animal Husbandry, East Pakistan. It was renamed to Directorate of Livestock Services in the 1960. After a number of reforms and name changes it was renamed to Department of Livestock Services.

== Offices ==
Department of Livestock Services has offices in every upazila in Bangladesh. From where citizens get livestock services and veterinary services.
