= Microcredit Regulatory Authority =

Microfinance regulator in Bangladesh

Organization logo

Microcredit Regulatory Authority (MRA) is the central body to monitor and supervise microfinance operations of non-governmental organizations of the Republic of Bangladesh. It was created by the Government of People's Republic of Bangladesh under the Microcredit Regulatory Authority Act (Act no. 32 of 2006). License from the Authority is mandatory to operate microfinance operation in Bangladesh as an NGO.

On September 28, 2012 at the Alliance for Financial Inclusion's Global Policy Forum 2012, the bank made a commitment under the Maya Declaration to promote agent and mobile banking, implement consumer protection initiatives, and establish a credit bureau for the MFI sector.

== Microcredit in Bangladesh ==
The microcredit program in Bangladesh is implemented by NGOs, Grameen Bank, different types of government-owned banks, private commercial banks, and specialized programs of some ministries of the Bangladesh Government, etc. Despite the fact that more than a thousand institutions are operating microcredit programs, only 10 large Microcredit Institutions (MFIs) and Grameen Bank represent 87% of total savings of the sector (around BD taka 93 billion) and 81% of total outstanding loans of the sector (around BD taka 157.82 billion). Nearly two hundred thousand people are employed in MFIs and Grameen Bank. Around 30 million poor people are directly benefiting from microcredit programs. Through the financial services of microcredit, these poor people are engaging themselves in various income generating activities. At present, financial service of BD taka 160 billion (approx.) is being rendered among 30 million poor people which help them to be self-employed which helps to accelerate the overall economic development process of the country.

Microcredit institutions have been providing various social and financial services to the poor to alleviate poverty within the society for the last three decades. However, they remained outside any central supervisory system. To bring the microcredit sector under a regulatory framework, the government of Bangladesh enacted the “Microcredit Regulatory Authority Act, 2006” on July 16, 2006 with effect from August 27, 2006. The Microcredit Regulatory Authority has been established under this Act and is empowered and responsible for monitoring and supervising the microcredit activities of the MFIs. According to the Act, no MFI can operate microcredit programs without obtaining a licence from MRA. Within the stipulated period, 4,236 microcredit institutions applied for a licence. Among them, 335 microcredit institutions have been licensed until September 2008. Applications by 438 institutions could not be considered. 2,599 small institutions are advised to fulfil minimum criteria of obtaining a licence (either minimum balance of outstanding loan at field level BD taka four million or minimum borrower 1,000) within June 2009.

== Financial inclusion ==
The Authority is active in the realm of financial inclusion and is a member of the Alliance for Financial Inclusion.
