= Land Record and Survey Department =

- Formation: 1975
- Headquarters: Dhaka, Bangladesh
- Region served: Bangladesh
- Official language: Bengali
- Director General: Md. Moazzem Hossain
- Website: Land Record and Survey Department

The Land Record and Survey Department (Bengali: ভূমি রেকর্ড ও জরিপ অধিদপ্তর) is a government department responsible for surveying and keeping records of land in Bangladesh. It is located in Tejgaon Thana, Dhaka, Bangladesh.

== History ==
The Land Record and Survey Department traces its origins to the Joint Directorate of Land Record and Survey Department which was established in 1885. Land Record Department became an independent department in 1888. The survey department was renamed the Survey of India. The government of Bangladesh created the Department of Land Records and Surveys in 1975.

In 2009 the Land Record and Survey Department took surveys of rivers in the Bangladesh-India border area with the Indian Land Record and Survey Department. In July 2011, the government of Bangladesh started the 'Digital Land Management' project to digitize land records in Bangladesh. According to the project a data centre will be built at the Land Record and Survey Department headquarters in Dhaka. By October 2017 650 thousand bhumi khatians (records of land rights) were digitized.
