= Water Resources Planning Organisation =

Government Agency of Bangladesh

Water Resources Planning Organization
- logo
- Formation: 1992
- Headquarters: Dhaka, Bangladesh
- Region served: Bangladesh
- Official language: Bengali
- Website: Water Resources Planning Organisation

Water Resources Planning Organisation is an autonomous national organisation responsible for the implementation of water resource planning in Bangladesh and is located in Dhaka, Bangladesh.

== History ==
The organisation was established in 1992. It traces it origins to Master Plan Organisation.
