= Department of Cooperatives =

- Formation: 1904
- Headquarters: Dhaka, Bangladesh
- Region served: Bangladesh
- Official language: Bengali
- Parent organization: Local Government, Rural Development & Cooperatives
- Website: coop.gov.bd

Department of Cooperatives (সমবায় অধিদপ্তর) is a Bangladesh government Department under the Ministry of Local Government, Rural Development and Co-operatives responsible for reducing poverty through cooperatives. It also responsible for regulating cooperatives, quasi-judicial services, and providing training to them. It also provides finance for cooperatives. Munima Hafiz is the Registrar and Director General of the department.

== History ==
History of Cooperatives Cooperatives have a proud and longstanding tradition in the development of rural economic infrastructure. The cooperative movement first began in the early 19th century in England. In 1821, Robert Owen organized workers in and around the town of New Lanark, England, and established a cooperative village. Through collective savings and mutual support, these workers sought to improve their livelihoods. Owen's initiative saw considerable success during its first two decades. However, due to managerial shortcomings, the movement eventually declined in the 1840s. Nevertheless, as Robert Owen laid the structural foundation of modern cooperatives, he is widely regarded as the "Father of Modern Cooperatives."

The true success of the modern cooperative movement began on August 14, 1844, in Rochdale, a small town near Manchester, England. There, 28 visionary workers, driven by self-belief and determination to become self-reliant, founded the "Rochdale Pioneers Equitable Cooperative Society."

Following the success of the Rochdale cooperative, an international organization named the International Cooperative Alliance (ICA) was established in August 1895. This alliance has since played a significant role in supporting and promoting the cooperative movement globally.

Later, in Spain's Basque region, a highly successful cooperative corporation known as the Mondragon Cooperative Corporation was founded. To this day, it remains one of the most prominent and successful examples of cooperative enterprise in the world.

At the beginning of the 20th century, the cooperative movement took root in the Indian subcontinent. During this period, approximately 90% of the population lived in rural areas, and agriculture was the primary source of livelihood for the masses.

In 1875, several agrarian uprisings took place in different parts of South India. These revolts stemmed from a lack of access to agricultural credit, exorbitant interest rates from moneylenders due to compound interest, and the increasing poverty of farmers. In response, the Indian Famine Commission of 1901 recommended reforms. Acting on these recommendations, and following the suggestions of a three-member committee formed by the then Viceroy Lord Curzon—comprising Lord Edward, Sir Nicholson, and Dupar Nix—the Cooperative Credit Societies Act of 1904 was enacted by the British Indian Government.

Later, in 1912, the government passed a new law titled the Cooperative Societies Act of 1912, which permitted the formation of both credit and non-credit cooperative societies. It included provisions for both limited and unlimited liability cooperatives. This act also allowed for the establishment of central and provincial-level cooperative banks and federations. As a result, various types of cooperatives began to emerge across the country in both agricultural and non-agricultural sectors.

To identify the problems within India's cooperatives and recommend improvements, the government formed a body titled "Imperial Cooperative in India," led by Sir Edward Maclagan. In 1915, the Maclagan Committee submitted its report, which later came to be known as the "Bible of Cooperation" in India due to its comprehensive nature and influence.

Under the 1912 Act, in 1918, the Bengal Provincial Cooperative Federation was established, marking the beginning of the development of provincial cooperative banks. In 1922, this federation was renamed the Bengal Provincial Bank.

In 1919, the Government of India declared cooperation as a provincial subject, bringing it under the jurisdiction of provincial governments. A minister was appointed at the provincial level to oversee cooperative matters. However, cooperative activities continued to operate under the 1912 Cooperative Societies Act.

In the 1920s, cooperatives related to jute trading achieved significant success. Sales and supply cooperatives, along with agricultural marketing cooperatives, played a crucial role in the jute trade. Their apex organization, the Bengal Cooperative Wholesale Society, achieved remarkable success in the jute sector between 1926 and 1929.

To revitalize the cooperative movement, the Bengal Provincial Government enacted the Bengal Cooperative Societies Act of 1940. In 1942, detailed rules and regulations under the title "Cooperative Rules of 1942" were published. However, the outbreak of World War II led to a sharp rise in commodity prices. In 1943, the province experienced a devastating famine. Simultaneously, by 1945, the anti-British movement gained momentum across India, and communal riots between Hindus and Muslims intensified. These events severely disrupted the cooperative movement and led to its decline.

Following the Partition in 1947, the cooperative movement experienced a state of stagnation. Although over 26,000 cooperative societies existed in East Pakistan at that time, most were in a deplorable condition. A significant number of these societies were dissolved within the next few years.

In 1948, through joint efforts of the government and cooperators, the East Pakistan Provincial Cooperative Bank was established. This institution aimed to revive the lending activities of cooperative societies. Instead of the earlier rural cooperatives, one Union Multipurpose Cooperative Society (UMCS) was formed in each union. These UMCSs were responsible for supplying fertilizers, seeds, pesticides, and diesel to farmers. The societies played a key role in promoting the use of chemical fertilizers and encouraging modern scientific farming practices.

During the 1950s, the East Pakistan Cooperative Jute Marketing Society and its affiliated jute purchasing cooperatives achieved remarkable success in the jute trade. Cooperatives ranked fifth in jute exports globally during that time.

In 1958, the State Bank of Pakistan began providing agricultural loans to cooperatives in this region. Several cooperative development projects were initiated and implemented during the First and Second Five-Year Plans in the 1960s, injecting fresh momentum into the movement.

In 1956, Dr. Akhter Hameed Khan established the Academy for Rural Development at Kotbari, Comilla, as a practical research institute. In 1960, he launched the two-tier cooperative system in Kotwali Thana of Comilla, consisting of Primary Cooperative Societies at the village level and a Thana Central Cooperative Association (KTCCA) at the sub-district level. In 1965, the Comilla District Integrated Rural Development Program (CDIRDP) expanded this model to 22 thanas (sub-districts) of Comilla.

In 1960, the Department of Cooperatives began publishing the monthly magazine "Samabaya" and the English bi-annual "Co-operation." That same year, the Bangladesh Cooperative College was established on Green Road, Dhaka.

In 1961, the Bangladesh National Cooperative Union (then East Pakistan Cooperative Union) became a member of the International Cooperative Alliance (ICA).

In 1962, the first National Cooperative Policy was formulated and disseminated. That year, the Cooperative College was also relocated from Green Road, Dhaka, to Kotbari, Comilla.

In 1971, the government launched the Integrated Rural Development Program (IRDP) to expand the two-tier cooperative system throughout the province. The IRDP headquarters was established in Dhaka, and operations began under the supervision of an Executive Director, with officials appointed at district and sub-district levels.

After independence, recognizing the significance of the cooperative movement, the Constitution of Bangladesh (Article 13(b)) declared cooperatives as one of the three fundamental forms of ownership in the country. Post-independence, the government committed to ensuring the supply of essential food and agricultural inputs at affordable prices to the general population through union-based multipurpose cooperative societies. Additionally, agricultural cooperatives were established in nearly every village to provide farmers with loans on easy terms.

On the other hand, the cooperative movement in Bangladesh followed a dual path. One stream—directed by the Department of Cooperatives—expanded beyond agriculture into other sectors of the economy, such as fish farming, sugarcane cultivation, handloom and handicraft industries, milk production and processing, among others.

The other stream—under the Integrated Rural Development Program (IRDP)—focused more intensively on agriculture. Under its core project, the IRDP began organizing rural populations by forming Farmer Cooperative Societies at the village level and Thana Central Cooperative Associations (TCCAs) at the sub-district level.

In 1973, to meet the growing demand for milk, the Bangladesh Milk Producers' Cooperative Union Ltd. (Milk Vita) was established. Its aim was to promote milk production, processing, and marketing based on cooperative principles.

In 1975, the Cooperative Department focused on forming vehicle and transport cooperatives, leading to the creation of organizations like the Bangladesh Public Transport Drivers' Cooperative Society and later the Bangladesh Auto-Rickshaw Drivers' Cooperative Society. At the same time, IRDP launched women's development programs, initiating the formation of Women’s Cooperative Societies.

In 1982, through a government ordinance, the IRDP was transformed into the Bangladesh Rural Development Board (BRDB) and was made an autonomous organization. That same year, the Cooperative Department strengthened the transport cooperative movement by forming the Bangladesh Truck Drivers' Cooperative Federation.

In 1983, under the Cooperative Department, the Bangladesh Cooperative Housing Federation was formed, marking the beginning of efforts to establish housing cooperatives.

Also in 1983, the Rural Development Project-2 was launched in 13 greater districts of the country through BRDB. A component of this project—called "Audit Capacity Strengthening"—was implemented by the Cooperative Department. To conduct audits for societies run by BRDB, audit officers were recruited under this project.

In 1984, BRDB launched the Rural Poor Program, which initiated the formation of Landless Cooperative Societies at the village level, later extending to Women's Landless Cooperative Societies.

On December 31, 1984, the Government of Bangladesh repealed the old Bengal Cooperative Societies Act of 1940 and issued the Cooperative Societies Ordinance, 1984, which was published in the government gazette on January 14, 1985.

That same year, the government incorporated the Cooperative Department into the Bangladesh Civil Service (BCS) cadre. In 1986, the implementation of the Bangladesh Cooperative College Development Project began.

On January 20, 1987, the Cooperative Societies Rules, 1987 were promulgated through a gazette notification. These rules introduced new provisions related to cooperative elections, along with several other reforms and updates.

In 1989, for the first time in independent Bangladesh, a National Cooperative Policy was formulated. In the same year, the Development Project of Eight Regional Cooperative Institutes, under the Department of Cooperatives, was approved by the National Economic Council.

In 2001, for the first time, a Cooperative Act in Bengali was enacted. In 2002, several sections of the 2001 Act were amended, and the Revised Cooperative Act, 2002 was issued. In support of the Cooperative Societies Act, 2001 and its Amendment Act, 2002, the Cooperative Societies Rules, 2004 were promulgated.

To promote cooperative initiatives for building a poverty-free and self-reliant Bangladesh, and to provide proper guidance to a people-centered cooperative movement, the Cooperative Policy of 1989 was updated and modernized into the National Cooperative Policy 2012. In 2013, the Cooperative Act was further amended and the Revised Cooperative Act, 2013 was enacted.

Over this long journey, the cooperative movement has expanded into various sectors of the economy. Cooperative societies are now involved in agriculture, production and marketing of consumer goods, fish farming, sugarcane cultivation, milk production, processing and marketing, handloom, handicrafts, pottery, leather industry, transport, housing, beekeeping, and many more areas.

These cooperatives have also crossed national boundaries, and their products are now being exported abroad. The number of such organized societies in different economic sectors has now reached approximately 175,000 (1.75 lakh). More than 10 million (1 crore) people have joined these societies as members, thereby strengthening the cooperative movement.

The cooperative movement is playing an active role in the socio-economic development of a large segment of the population.

Functions:

1.Motivating according to the cooperative policy and providing registration.

2.Establishing good governance through cooperative auditing, inspection, and supervision.

3.Enhancing the professional capacity of officers/employees of the Department of Cooperatives by creating opportunities for training and advanced training.

4.Improving members' skills through practical training, capital formation, and promoting self-employment to reduce poverty.

5.Strengthening cooperative networking by promoting cooperative values, publishing materials, and organizing seminars and workshops.

6.Creating capital through fund formation and investment, and establishing cooperative-based business enterprises.

7.Empowering rural women and promoting their socio-economic development through cooperative-based projects and programs.

8.Branding cooperative products and establishing market linkages.

9.Formulating and implementing necessary policies, development programs, and projects to achieve set objectives.
