= Abul Hasnat (Chandpur politician) =

Bangladeshi politician

Member of Bangladesh Parliament
- In office February 1996 – June 2001
- Preceded by: Mesbah Uddin
- Succeeded by: A.N.M. Ehsanul Hoque Milan

Personal details
- Political party: Bangladesh Nationalist Party

Abul Hasnat is a Bangladesh Nationalist Party politician and a member of parliament for Chandpur-1.

== Career ==
Hasnat was elected to parliament for Chandpur-1 as a Bangladesh Nationalist Party candidate in February 1996.
