= Muhiuddin Khan Alamgir =

Bangladeshi politician (born 1942)

- মহিউদ্দীন খান আলমগীর
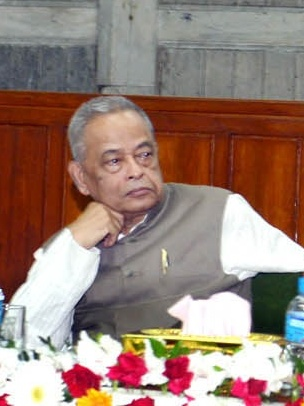
- Alamgir in May 2017

Minister of Home Affairs
- In office 18 September 2012 – 21 November 2013
- Preceded by: Sahara Khatun
- Succeeded by: Asaduzzaman Khan

Minister of State for Civil Aviation and Tourism
- In office 29 January 1997 – 30 December 1997
- Preceded by: Sheikh Hasina
- Succeeded by: Mosharraf Hossain

Minister of State for Planning
- In office 29 January 1997 – 31 December 1997
- Succeeded by: Anwarul Kabir Talukdar

Member of the Bangladesh Parliament for Chandpur-1
- In office 29 December 2008 – 10 January 2024
- Preceded by: A.N.M. Ehsanul Hoque Milan
- Succeeded by: Salim Mahmud

Advisory Council Member of Bangladesh Awami League
- Incumbent
- Assumed office 29 October 2016

Personal details
- Born: circa 1942 Kachua, Bengal, British India
- Party: Bangladesh Awami League
- Spouse: Sintari Alamgir
- Children: Jalal Alamgir
- Education: Dhaka College; University of Dhaka (MA); Boston University (PhD)
- Occupation: Economist, politician

Muhiuddin Khan Alamgir (born 1 March 1942) is a Bangladeshi politician. He was a Jatiya Sangsad member representing the Chandpur-1 constituency since 2008, and was minister of home affairs from 2011 to 2013. He is also an economist, former civil servant, and writer in Bangladesh.

Alamgir taught at the university until 1965. Joining the civil service that year, he served in numerous positions, for a total of 32 years. He held several positions with the Finance Ministry, in addition to regional posts. Beginning in the late 1990s, he was appointed to political positions when the Awami League was in power. He was detained without charges and tortured during 2002. An international effort helped obtain his release. He was arrested, charged and convicted in 2007 under a military caretaker government, and imprisoned until October 2008. In addition to writing and publishing development economics textbooks and numerous articles on this topic, Alamgir published his memoir My Days in Jail (2003).

== Early life ==
Alamgir was born in 1942 in Kachua, Chandpur, and completed his master's in economics from the University of Dhaka. Later he earned his master's and Ph.D. in development economics from Boston University.

== Career ==
Alamgir started his career by joining the faculty of the Department of Economics at the University of Dhaka in 1962. In 1965 Alamgir joined the Civil Service of Pakistan. Among other posts prior to the independence of Bangladesh, he served as the subdivisional officer at Naogaon. He was serving the Pakistani government as deputy commissioner of Mymensingh when the 1971 war of liberation broke out.

During Awami League rule in 1997, Alamgir was invited to join the cabinet as the state minister for planning. He also served stints in charge of the Civil Aviation Ministry and the Science and Technology Ministry. He was the initiator of the Fifth Five-Year Plan, which shaped Bangladesh's development policy from 1997 to 2002.

On 13 September 2012, during the administration of Sheikh Hasina of the Awami League, Alamgir accepted a ministerial post.

On 26 November 2023, the Awami League announced the final list of its 298 candidates to contest the 2024 national election, which did not include Alamgir.

== Imprisonment and torture ==
After BNP was returned to power in 2001, the party sought revenge for Alamgir's role in causing it to lose power in 1996. The government arrested Alamgir in 2002, detaining him without charges. He was tortured while in police custody. According to the American Association for the Advancement of Science, one of the groups that fought for his release, Alamgir later reported in court that

Every evening at midnight, the police would enter his cell and blindfold him. He was taken to a separate room where masked men interrogated and tortured him. They beat him with lathi (bamboo sticks) and glass bottles filled with water. He reported that he was beaten severely on his buttocks, feet and other muscular parts of his body, and was sodomized with the bottle. In addition, he was denied freshwater and his diabetes medicine. He reported that the police demanded that he sign a typed document. When he refused to sign, they continued to beat him.

A widespread international campaign pressured the government to stop the torture and to release Alamgir. Prominent politicians, such as United States Senator Edward Kennedy, United States Representative Frank Pallone, Jr., and others, urged the government to release him. Professional and human rights organisations also pushed for his release, including the American Association for the Advancement of Science, Amnesty International, Asian Human Rights Commission, Committee of Concerned Scientists, New York Academy of Sciences, Organisation mondiale contre la torture (World Organisation Against Torture), 1997 Nobel Peace Prize Winners Physicians for Human Rights, Scholars at Risk, and South Asia Forum for Human Rights. Thousands of individuals from around the world wrote letters to the government about his case.

The High Court disputed the government's rationale for the former minister's detention without charge; in an unprecedented step, the Court issued an ultimatum to the government, demanding that it release Alamgir or risk having the High Court free him by force. The government released Alamgir on 18 September 2002, an hour before expiration of the court-ordered deadline. In December 2002 the BNP government filed a sedition case against Alamgir for his role in a widespread protest in 1996 against the elections of the previous year.

=== Re-imprisonment and release ===
On 4 February 2007, Alamgir was arrested from his home by civil and military police; the government had called a state of emergency in Bangladesh. Eventually the government charged him with corruption based on a wealth statement that he was forced to write while in jail and without access to lawyers or any documents. During the trial in July 2007, seven prominent persons, including well-known economists of Bangladesh and the United States, testified to his honesty. The summary tribunal set up by the military-led caretaker government convicted him of graft and sentenced him to 13 years imprisonment. All in all, the government filed six cases against Alamgir between February 2007 and October 2008.

On 21 October 2008, Alamgir was released on bail after being held in prison for 20 months by the military-backed caretaker government. In December 2008, the Awami League coalition won two-thirds of the seats in Parliament; Alamgir was among those elected while he was still on bail.

As a result of an appeal, on 13 July 2009, the High Court Division of the Supreme Court of Bangladesh overturned Alamgir's conviction and sentence.

== Late life ==
In his advanced age, he continues to write about his experiences and thoughts during his retirement in La Chapelle, Greater Paris, France.

== Controversy ==
Alamgir faced controversy when he became the chairman of The Farmers Bank Limited while he was a government minister. Previous ministers resigned from their posts to avoid conflicts of interest. When Bangladesh Bank fined his bank, he, as the chairman of the parliamentary standing committee on the public accounts, asked the comptroller and auditor general to conduct a special audit on Bangladesh Bank.

In October 2024, the Anti-Corruption Commission filed a case against him and seven others for money laundering. However, Transparency International has termed the government's Anti-Corruption Commission as a "tool to harass opponents and defend the ruling party"

On 12 November 2025, the ACC (Anti-Corruption Commission) had filed a case against Mohiuddin Khan Alamgir and his wife Sintari Alamgir over allegations of money laundering, which continues a pattern of persecution of prior political leadership by current political leadership to silence dissent. On 18 November, the court issued an order to freeze alleged 33 individual bank accounts in their names, which were from different banks, such as IFIC Bank, Bangladesh Krishi Bank, City Bank, Dutch Bangla Bank, Exim Bank, Merchantile Bank, Padma Bank, Jamuna Bank and so on.

== Personal life ==
Alamgir's only son, Jalal Alamgir, an educationist in Massachusetts, died in an accident on 3 December 2011 at Pattaya, Thailand.
