= Akania =

Akania may refer to:

- Akania (plant), a genus of plants
- Akania, Dakshin Kachua, a village in the south of Kachua Upazila, Bangladesh
- Akania, Karaia, a village in the north of Kachua Upazila, Bangladesh

== See also ==
- Akanye, a sound change in Slavic languages
