= Md Obayed Ullah Al Masud =

Bangladeshi banker

Md Obayed Ullah Al Masud is a Bangladeshi banker who has been the former Managing Director of Sonali Bank and Rupali Bank. and ex-director of Padma Bank. As of Oct 6,2024 he is the Chairman of Islami Bank.

== Early life and education ==
Masud completed his Bachelors and Masters in Commerce from the University of Dhaka in 1982, and MBA from the Institute of Business Administration, University of Dhaka in 1988.

== Career ==
Masud joined Agrani Bank in 1983 as a senior officer.

In 2011, Masud became the Deputy Managing Director of Agrani Bank. He then worked as the Managing Director of Karmasangsthan Bank.

From 24 August 2016 to 24 August 2019, Masud was the Managing Director of Sonali Bank. During his term he worked on recovering defaulted loans. He also introduced low interest housing loans for government officers.

In January 2017, Masud was elected an executive member of Bangladesh Foreign Exchange Dealers' Association. On 21 August 2019, he was appointed Managing Director of Rupali Bank and Ataur Rahman Prodhan replaced him as the Managing Director of Sonali Bank. He retired from Rupali Bank on 27th August 2022.

Masud represented Rupali Bank at the Metropolitan Chamber of Commerce and Industry. During his tenure, Rupali Bank received criticism for a very generous rescheduling plan for loan defaulter Mother Textile.

== Personal life ==
Masud's brother, Hedayetullah Al Mamun, was the chairman of Janata Bank, a state-owned bank.
