= S. A. Group =

Bangladeshi conglomerate

S. A. Group of Industries
- Formation: 1988
- Headquarters: Bangladesh
- Region served: Bangladesh
- Official language: Bengali
- Managing Director: Shahabuddin Alam
- Website: www.sagroupbd.com

S. A. Group of Industries (Bengali: এস.এ গ্রুপ অফ ইন্ডাস্ট্রিস) is a Bangladeshi diversified conglomerate based in Chittagong. Shahabuddin Alam is the managing director of S.A. Group of Industries. The company has a workforce of 2,500 by 2022. SA Group of Industries has been operating 17 factories since 1988 with 8 master products under two brands Goalini and Muskan. These include Dhaka and Chittagong edible oil refineries, condensed milk, dairy products, tea leaves, flour, semolina, salt, water, paper and paper products.

== History ==
S. A. Group of Industries was established in 1988. S.A. Group of Industries started producing Appayan Vegetable Oil in 2006. 17 industries are operating. These include Dhaka and Chittagong edible oil refineries, condensed milk, dairy products, tea leaves, flour, semolina, salt, water, paper and paper products.

On 23 May 2011, Department of Environment funded Shah Amanat Textile Mill, a subsidiary of S.A. Group of Industries, 2.8 million taka for polluting the environment and operating without an Effluent Treatment Plant.

Bangladesh Bank after an investigation in May 2013 found Shahabuddin Alam, managing director of S.A. Group of Industries and Director of Mercantile Bank, had embezzled money from the bank for his S.A Group of Industries.

In 2014, Bangladesh Bank fined Bangladesh Krishi Bank 50 thousand taka for providing 1.8 billion taka loan to S.A. Group of Industries, through two subsidiaries, despite it being known as a loan defaulter. Agrani Bank Limited filed a lawsuit against Shahabuddin Alam and his wife over the bouncing of three cheques. On 20 February 2020, they both secured bail from the Chittagong Metropolitan Session Court Judge SM Mojibur Rahman.

National Bank auctioned properties owned by SA Oil Refinery to recover 2.15 billion taka loan. The Bank sued Alam and his wife, Yasmin Alam, who is also chairperson of S.A. Group of Industries over the bouncing of a 10 million taka checque. It had sued S.A. Group of Industries on 27 March 2016 with Double Mooring Police Station in Chittagong to recover the loan. A Chittagong Court issued a travel ban on the managing director of S.A. Group of Industries, Shahabuddin Alam.

On 11 October 2017, Islami Bank announced that they will three properties mortgaged by S.A. Group of Industries to recover 5.73 billion taka loan given to three subsidiaries of S.A. Group of Industries, Kamal Vegetables Oil, Sharija Oil Refinery, and Sharija Navigation. The S.A. Group of Industries restructured loans from Agrani Bank Limited, Bank Asia Limited, First Security Islami Bank Limited, Janata Bank Limited, Prime Bank Limited, and Rupali Bank Limited worth 10 billion taka according to Bangladesh Bank.

On 18 October 2018, managing director of S.A. Group of Industries, Shahabuddin Alam was arrested by the Criminal Investigation Department over irregular loans. S.A. Group of Industries is one of the largest loan defaulters in Bangladesh with total outstanding loans exceeding 35 billion taka. Bank Asia sued him for defaulting on a 280 million taka loan with EPZ Police Station in Chittagong. He was detained on the Bank Asia case from 2014 over the import of crude palm oil. Alam was also sued by Prime Bank which had alleged that he transferred ownership of his mortgaged properties to his children and other close relatives. The Bank is owned 840 million taka by SA Oil Refinery and Samannaz Super Oil, owned by Alam. Pubali Bank sued Alam and his wife for dishonoring a check and they owe 2.75 billion taka to the bank. Pubali Bank also requested Bangladesh Bank to remove Alam as a director of Mercantile Bank because by law a loan defaulter cannot be director of a bank. Ashrafuzzaman Ansari, Dhaka Metropolitan Magistrate, sent Alam to jail. Anti-Corruption Commission sued him in October 2018 over loan embezzlement from The Farmers Bank Limited. Alam announced his intention to sell his stake of Mercantile Bank to the Dhaka Stock Exchange on 1 September 2020. He was removed from the post of director of the bank in 2017.

Bangmata International Squash Tournament was held in Chittagong in March 2022 courtesy of SA Group of Industries. Through this tournament, SA group of Industries became known. Ten countries participated here. A total of 48 players including 32 male and 16 female players from India, Pakistan, Sri Lanka, Iran, Canada, Malaysia, Australia, Kuwait, Egypt and Bangladesh competed in this tournament. At that time, the organization claimed that they have brought back a game lost from Bangladesh through this tournament.

== Businesses ==
- S.A Pulp and Paper Mills Limited
- South Eastern Paper Mills Limited
- Shah Amanat Textile Mill
- Milko Laban
- Milko UHT milk
- Appayan Vegetable Oil
- SA Oil Refinery
- Samannaz Super Oil
- Kamal Vegetables Oil
- Sharija Oil Refinery
- Sharija Navigation
- Goalini full cream milk powder
- Goalini plus condensed milk
- Muskan Salt
- Muskan Dalda
- Muskan Atta, Maida, and Suji
- Muskan soybean oil
- Muskan tea
- Muskan drinking water
