= Chandpur-1 =

Constituency of Bangladesh's Jatiya Sangsad

Coordinates: 23.34°N 90.89°E

- Constituency for the Jatiya Sangsad
- District: Chandpur District
- Division: Chittagong Division
- Electorate: 265,966 (2018)

Current constituency
- Created: 1984
- Party: Bangladesh Nationalist Party
- Member: A. N. M. Ehsanul Hoque Milan
- ← 259 Comilla-11 261 Chandpur-2 →

Chandpur-1 is a constituency represented in the Jatiya Sangsad (National Parliament) of Bangladesh since 2026 by A. N. M. Ehsanul Hoque Milan of the Bangladesh Nationalist Party.

== Boundaries ==
The constituency encompasses Kachua Upazila.

== History ==
The constituency was created in 1984 from a Comilla constituency when the former Comilla District was split into three districts: Brahmanbaria, Comilla, and Chandpur.

Ahead of the 2008 general election, the Election Commission redrew constituency boundaries to reflect population changes revealed by the 2001 Bangladesh census. The 2008 redistricting altered the boundaries of the constituency.

Ahead of the 2014 general election, the Election Commission reduced the boundaries of the constituency. Previously it had also included one union parishad of Matlab Dakshin Upazila: Narayanpur.

== Members of Parliament ==
Election	Member	Party
1986	Rafiqul Islam Roni	Jatiya Party
1988	A. K. S. M. Shahidul Islam	Jatiya Party
1991	Mesbah Uddin	Awami League
Feb 1996	Abul Hasnat	Bangladesh Nationalist Party
Jun 1996	A. N. M. Ehsanul Hoque Milan	Bangladesh Nationalist Party
2008	Muhiuddin Khan Alamgir	Awami League
2024	Salim Mahmud	Awami League
2026	A. N. M. Ehsanul Hoque Milan	Bangladesh Nationalist Party

== Elections ==
=== Elections in the 2020s ===
General Election 2026: Chandpur-1
Party	Candidate	Votes	%	±%
BNP	A.N.M. Ehsanul Hoque Milan	133,032		
Jamaat	Abu Nohar Muhammad Makbul Ahmad	70,368		
BNP gain from AL				

=== Elections in the 2010s ===
Like 153 other constituencies out of the total 300 nationwide, Muhiuddin Khan Alamgir was re-elected unopposed in the 2014 general election after 18 parties led by the Bangladesh Nationalist Party boycotted the election citing unfair conditions for the election.

=== Elections in the 2000s ===
General Election 2008: Chandpur-1
Party	Candidate	Votes	%	±%
AL	Muhiuddin Khan Alamgir	107,461	56.5	+14.6
BNP	A.N.M. Ehsanul Hoque Milan	80,872	42.5	−14.8
BIF	Abdul Haque	732	0.4	N/A
IAB	Md. Muslim	645	0.3	N/A
Gano Forum	Md. Azad Hossain	491	0.3	N/A
Majority		26,589	14.0	−1.4
Turnout		190,201	86.4	+12.7
AL gain from BNP				

General Election 2001: Chandpur-1
Party	Candidate	Votes	%	±%
BNP	A.N.M. Ehsanul Hoque Milan	85,507	57.3	+22.5
AL	Muhiuddin Khan Alamgir	62,537	41.9	+10.2
IJOF	Shafiullah Majumder	725	0.5	N/A
Independent	A. K. S. M. Shahidul Islam	299	0.2	N/A
Bangladesh People's Congress	Latif Majumder	91	0.1	N/A
Majority		22,970	15.4	+12.3
Turnout		149,159	73.7	+4.4
BNP hold				

=== Elections in the 1990s ===
General Election June 1996: Chandpur-1
Party	Candidate	Votes	%	±%
BNP	A.N.M. Ehsanul Hoque Milan	34,240	34.8	+4.7
AL	Mesbah Uddin	31,214	31.7	+1.0
Independent	Rafiqul Islam Roni	16,337	16.6	+2.5
JP(E)	Wahidur Rahman	12,555	12.8	−4.3
Jamaat	Khandaker Mou. Md. Hurunur Rashid	2,958	3.0	−1.5
BIF	Alamgir Shah	569	0.6	N/A
Zaker Party	Omar Faruk Majumdar	389	0.4	−1.1
Gano Forum	Reza Pahlabi Mazid	116	0.1	N/A
Majority		3,026	3.1	+2.5
Turnout		98,378	69.3	+22.8
BNP gain from AL				

General Election 1991: Chandpur-1
Party	Candidate	Votes	%	±%
AL	Mesbah Uddin	25,732	30.7	
BNP	Abul Hasnat	25,232	30.1	
JP(E)	A. K. S. M. Shahidul Islam	14,406	17.1	
Independent	Rafiqul Islam Roni	11,800	14.1	
Jamaat	A. Majid	3,785	4.5	
WPB	Shah Alam	1,300	1.6	
Zaker Party	Omar Faruk Majumdar	1,291	1.5	
Jatiya Samajtantrik Dal-JSD	Zaber Miah	302	0.4	
Majority		500	0.6	
Turnout		83,848	46.5	
AL gain from JP(E)				
