= Abhaypara =

Avaypara অভয়পাড়া
- Location in Bangladesh
- Coordinates: 23°24′N 90°52′E
- Country: Bangladesh
- Division: Chittagong Division
- District: Chandpur District
- Time zone: UTC+6 (Bangladesh Time)

Avaypara (Bengali: অভয়পাড়া) is a village at Kachua Upazila in Chandpur District in the Chittagong Division of central-eastern Bangladesh. It is a village of the Bitara union. All villagers are Muslim. Avaypara name from Avay Villa in this village. There is a government primary school and six mosques in this village. The River Khirai flows the south of the village. The Ghugra Bill is the north of the village. In the east is Shankerpur and Bitara is in the west.
