= Ainpur =

- Location in Bangladesh
- Coordinates: 23°24′N 90°53′E
- Country: Bangladesh
- Division: Chittagong Division
- District: Chandpur District
- Time zone: UTC+6 (Bangladesh Time)
- Area code: 3450 to 4750

Ainpur is a village in Kachua Upazila of Chandpur District in the Chittagong Division of eastern Bangladesh. It is about 59 kilometres (37 mi) south-east of Dhaka, the country's capital. The closest airport is Comilla Airiport Airport (IATA: CLA, ICAO: VGCM), 32.9 kilometres (20.4 mi) east of the city centre of Ainpur.
