= Khondkar Ibrahim Khaled =

Bangladeshi economist and former Deputy Governor of Bangladesh (1941–2021)

- খোন্দকার ইব্রাহিম খালেদ
- Born: 4 July 1941; Gopalganj, Bengal Province, British India
- Died: 24 February 2021 (aged 79); Dhaka, Bangladesh
- Education: University of Dhaka
- Occupation: Economist

Khondkar Ibrahim Khaled (4 July 1941 – 24 February 2021) was a Bangladeshi economist and former Deputy Governor of Bangladesh Bank. In 2011, Bangla Academy awarded him an honorary fellowship.

== Early life ==
Khaled was born on 4 July 1941 in Gopalganj District in the then Bengal Province, British India. He holds a master's in geography from the University of Dhaka and an MBA from the Institute of Business Administration, University of Dhaka.

== Career ==
Khaled has been associated with the banking system since 1963. He served as managing director of Bangladesh Krishi Bank from 1994 to 1995. He was the managing director of Agrani Bank in 1996 and Sonali Bank in 1997. Later he was the Deputy Governor of Bangladesh Bank from 1998 to 2001. He was the managing director of Pubali Bank from 2001 to 2006.

On 30 January 2008, Khaled was appointed chairman of Bangladesh Krishi Bank. He was a director of Grameen Fund. He opposed the creation of Probashi Kallyan Bank.

In 2009, Khaled was awarded the Khan Bahadur Ahsanullah Gold Medal. A Dhaka Court stopped the case against Khaled by Bangladesh Thai Aluminium Limited which called for Khaled to remove a portion of his report which identified the company as a money launderer. His report examined the crash of Dhaka Stock Exchange and called for reforms of Bangladesh Securities and Exchange Commission. His report mentioned that 200 billion taka was swindled from the market by some traders in collusion with regulators. His report implicated regulator Anwarul Kabir Bhuiyan. He also implicated Salman F Rahman, Awami League politician and businessman, and Dhaka Stock Exchange president Rakibur Rahman.

In 2013, Khaled was awarded the Khan Bahadur Nawab Ali Chowdhury National Award.

In February 2020, Bangladesh High Court appointed Khaled chairman of International Leasing and Financial Services Limited but he resigned in March citing large embezzlement. Khaled served as an independent director on the Board of Directors of Pubali Bank Limited since 9 December 2020.

== Death ==
On 1 February 2021, Khaled tested positive for COVID-19 and was admitted to Bangladesh Specialized Hospital Limited. He was placed on life support on 23 February. He was later moved to Bangabandhu Sheikh Mujib Medical University where he died on 24 February 2021.
