= India's Open-Economy Policy =

India's Open-Economy Policy: Globalism, Rivalry, Continuity is a book on political economy by Jalal Alamgir, published by Routledge (London and New York, 2008; Paperback edition 2010)

The book explains why India's open-economy policy, initiated in 1991, has continued despite widespread domestic political risks. It draws implications for countries seeking to politically market grand or controversial ideas.

The book's methodological approach is influenced by both realism and constructivism. Going as far back as the 19th century, the author reconstructs how Indian policymakers have interpreted economic priorities, perceived success and failure, and evaluated the destiny of their nation. By the 1990s, their imperatives increasingly highlighted a sense of rivalry, especially with China, and globalism, a desire to play a strong role in world affairs. The book attempts to show how a sense of nationalist urgency was created through globalism and rivalry, allowing policymakers to privilege international needs over domestic political demands, replace economic independence with interdependence as a priority, and ensure that the broad basis of India's openness could not be challenged effectively even though certain policies faced severe opposition.

The book was selected by Asia Policy of the National Bureau of Asian Research as one of the recommended books for its 2008 Policymakers Library.

The book has 192 pages, 5 chapters. Currently only a hardcover edition is available. ISBN 978-0-415-77684-4
