= Andirpar =

- Village
- Location in Chittagong division
- Coordinates: 23°22′N 90°55′E
- Country: Bangladesh
- Division: Chittagong
- District: Chandpur
- Upazila: Kachua
- Time zone: UTC+6 (Bangladesh Time)

Andirpar is a village in Kachua Upazila of Chandpur District in the Chittagong Division of eastern Bangladesh.
