= Hedayetullah Al Mamun =

Ministry of Finance of Bangladesh (born 1958)

Hedayetullah Al Mamoon NDC

Chairman, Bangladesh NGO Foundation
- In office 14 June 2018 – 13 June 2022
- Preceded by: A. F. M. Yahia Chowdhury
- Succeeded by: Rezaul Ahsan

Senior Secretary, Finance Division
- In office 2017–2017
- Preceded by: Mahbub Ahmed
- Succeeded by: Mohammad Muslim Chowdhury

Personal details
- Born: 5 October 1958 (age 67) Nawabganj, Dhaka, Bangladesh
- Education: University of Dhaka; National Defence College
- Occupation: Secretary, Government official

Hedayetullah Al Mamoon is a retired senior secretary at the Ministry of Finance of Bangladesh and the chairperson of Janata Bank.

== Early life ==
Mamun was born on October 5, 1958 in Nawabganj, Dhaka district. His father was Jalal Uddin Molla and mother was Fatema Khatun. He received a Bachelor's (Honours) degree from the English Department of Dhaka University and completed the National Defense Course from the National Defense College. He earned a Masters in Public Affairs (MPA) degree in Governance and Public Policy from Dhaka University.

== Career ==
Mamun joined the Bangladesh Civil Service in 1982.

In November 2008, Mamun was appointed the additional secretary to the Ministry of Law, Justice and Parliamentary Affairs. Bangladesh Judicial Service Association expressed concern over the appointment of Mamun as he was an admin cadre.

In 2009, Mamun served as the secretary of the Ministry of Culture. He then became the secretary at the Ministry of Civil Aviation and Tourism in October 2009.

Mamun served as the secretary of the Ministry of Information.

From 2014 to 28 February 2017, Mamun was the secretary of the Ministry of Commerce. On 25 February 2018, he was appointed the chairman of Janata Bank, a state owned bank, by the Bank and Financial Institutions Division of the Ministry of Finance.

Mamun held a solo lecture on 28 June 2019 on the works of Ranjit Kumar Biswas, writer and former bureaucrat, at the Bangla Academy.

In 2020, Mamun became the member secretary of the newly launched Association of Former Secretaries. He is member of the governing body of Bangladesh Institute of Governance and Management. In September 2022, the government dissolved the trustee board of Manarat International University and created a new board which included him.

After the fall of the Sheikh Hasina led Awami League government, a murder case was filed against Mamun by Bangladesh Nationalist Party politician Mohammad Zaman Hossain Khan over the death of a protestor in July 2024.

== Personal life ==
Mamun's brother, Obayed Ullah Al Masud, is the managing director of Rupali Bank and previously headed Sonali Bank, both state owned banks.
