= Aingiri =

- Location in Bangladesh
- Coordinates: 23°19′42″N 90°57′40″E
- Country: Bangladesh
- Division: Chittagong Division
- District: Chandpur District
- Time zone: UTC+6 (Bangladesh Time)

Aingiri is a village in Chandpur District in the Chittagong Division of Eastern Bangladesh.

== Description ==
Aingiri is located in the district of Kachua Upazila.

== Population ==
Aingiri has different educational institutions, including;

- Aingiri Government Primary School
- Aingiri High School
- Aingiri Golzarshah Islamia Alim Madrasha

== Amenities ==
Aingiri has a government hospital. The village has 6 mosques.

There is a Hindu temple in Karmokar Bari.
