= Taltoli Jama Mosque =

Mosque in Chandpur, Bangladesh

- তালতলি জামে মসজিদ
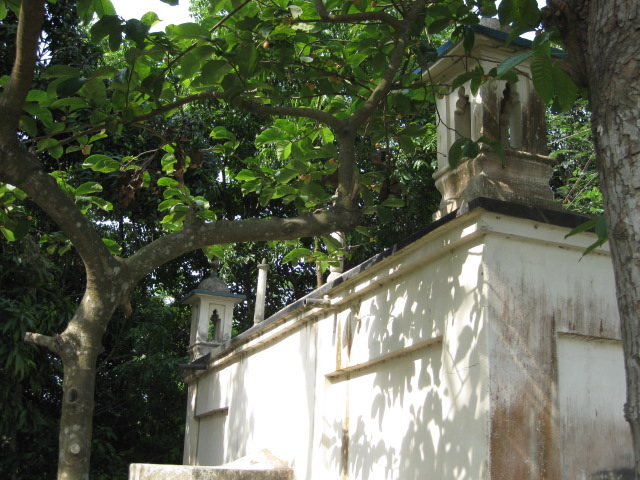

- Location of the mosque in Bangladesh

Religion
- Affiliation: Sunni Islam
- Ecclesiastical or organizational status: Friday mosque
- Status: Active

Location
- Location: Taltoli, Kachua Upazila, Chandpur
- Country: Bangladesh
- Interactive map of Taltoli Jama Mosque
- Coordinates: 23°27′55″N 90°41′42″E

Architecture
- Type: Mosque architecture
- Style: Indo-Saracenic Revival; Indo-Islamic
- Completed: 1891

Specifications
- Direction of façade: East
- Minaret: Four

The Taltoli Jama Mosque (Bengali: তালতলি জামে মসজিদ), formerly known as the Munshibari Jama Mosque, is a 19th-century Sunni Friday mosque in the village of Taltoli in Chandpur District, Bangladesh.

== History ==
It was completed in 1891 in British India by Ab'dul Hamid Munshi of the Munshibari estate by a pond owned by the Munshi family.

Since then, the Imams and Muezzins called the local Muslims to the congregational mosque (then known as the Munshibari Masjid), where Jumu'ah or weekly Friday noon congregation prayers took place.

== Architecture ==
Built by local masons, the structure is of Indo-Saracenic Revival and Indo-Islamic blend. It has four minarets in four corners of the structure, a hallway, the Mihrab in the main prayer room (musallah).

The Mihrab has a Minbar for regional khatibs to deliver sermons (khutbah) The exterior has a corridor by the pond for ritual purification (Wudu). The stairs lead to the top of the mosque. The structure houses a living quarter for the Islamic scholars and carved in library in the main hall for scriptures used during Madrasah lessons.

== See also ==
- Islam in Bangladesh
- List of mosques in Bangladesh
