= A. N. M. Ehsanul Hoque Milan =

Bangladeshi politician

Ehsanul Hoque Milan
- এহসানুল হক মিলন
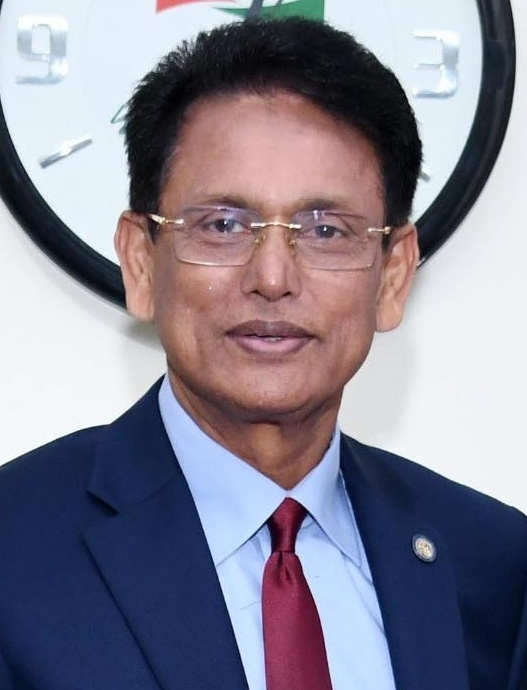
- Milan in 2026

Minister for Education
- Incumbent
- Assumed office 17 February 2026
- President: Mohammed Shahabuddin; Hafiz Uddin Ahmad (acting); Mirza Fakhrul Islam Alamgir
- Prime Minister: Tarique Rahman
- Preceded by: Chowdhury Rafiqul Abrar

Minister for Primary and Mass Education
- Incumbent
- Assumed office 17 February 2026
- President: Mohammed Shahabuddin; Hafiz Uddin Ahmad (acting); Mirza Fakhrul Islam Alamgir
- Prime Minister: Tarique Rahman
- Preceded by: Bidhan Ranjan Roy Poddar

Member of the Bangladesh Parliament for Chandpur-1
- Incumbent
- Assumed office 17 February 2026
- Preceded by: Muhiuddin Khan Alamgir
- In office 23 June 1996 – 29 October 2006
- Preceded by: Mesbah Uddin Khan
- Succeeded by: Muhiuddin Khan Alamgir

Minister of State for Education
- In office 10 October 2001 – 29 October 2006
- Prime Minister: Khaleda Zia
- Preceded by: Zinnatunnessa Talukdar
- Succeeded by: Ismat Ara Sadek

Personal details
- Born: 1 January 1957 (age 69) Kachua, East Pakistan, Pakistan
- Party: Bangladesh Nationalist Party
- Spouse: Nazmun Nahar Baby
- Children: 1
- Education: International Islamic University Malaysia

Abu Naser Muhammad Ehsanul Hoque Milan (Bengali: আবু নাসের মুহাম্মদ এহসানুল হক মিলন; born 1 January 1957) is a Bangladeshi politician affiliated with the Bangladesh Nationalist Party (BNP). He has been the incumbent Jatiya Sangsad member representing the Chandpur-1 constituency and the incumbent minister of education since February 2026. He represented the same constituency from 1996 to 2006 and was the state minister for education from 2001 to 2006 under Prime Minister Khaleda Zia.

== Early life and education ==
Milan was born in Kachua, Chandpur (then part of Comilla), on 1 January 1957. His father, Obaidul Haque, worked as a government officer, and his mother was Mahmuda Haque. He completed his secondary education at Sher-e-Bangla Nagar Government Boys' High School and higher secondary education at Government Intermediate Technical College (now Government Science College).

Milan earned a chemistry degree from the University of Dhaka. In 1982, Milon moved to the United States and obtained an MBA from the New York Institute of Technology. He served as an adjunct lecturer at Brooklyn College and Borough of Manhattan Community College, and worked professionally as a chemist in the pharmaceutical industry. In 2018, he earned a PhD in political science from the International Islamic University Malaysia; his dissertation examined the role of technical and vocational education and training in Bangladesh's socioeconomic development.

== Personal life ==
Milan is married to Nazmun Nahar Baby. She graduated in zoology from the University of Dhaka and in Computer Information Science (CIS) from the City University of New York (CUNY). She serves as vice-president of the central committee of Bangladesh Jatiotabadi Mohila Dal. They have a daughter, Tanjeeda Nahar Hoque, who graduated in international criminal law from John Jay College of Criminal Justice.

== Political career ==
Milan began his political career in the student movement. Elected as sports secretary of Fazlul Haque Hall Chhatra Sangsad (student council) in 1978–79 under the Jasad-backed Chhatra League, he later joined Bangladesh Jatiotabadi Chatra Dal and held leadership positions in the late 1970s and early 1980s. In 1993, BNP leader Khaleda Zia appointed him as international affairs secretary. He also founded and coordinated the BNP-USA chapter until 1996.

Milan became a parliament member for the first time in the 7th national parliament election held in 1996 from the constituency 260, Chandpur-1, Kachua. In the election of the 8th national parliament held in 2001, he defeated the Awami League candidate, former minister Muhiuddin Khan Alamgir, by a large margin. Prime Minister Begum Khaleda Zia appointed Milan as the state minister for education. After being responsible for Chandpur, he started a movement called Jatka Nidhon Protirodh Andolon (Stop Killing Small Hilsa Fish) on his own initiative.

Milan won the 2026 Bangladeshi general election, contesting at the Chandpur-1 constituency and securing 133,032 votes while his nearest opponent Bangladesh Jamaat-e-Islami candidate Abu Nohar Muhammad Makbul Ahmad got 70,368 votes.

=== Controversies and legal issues ===
After serving in office, Milon faced legal challenges. On 5 June 2012, he secured bail in numerous cases and subsequently traveled abroad. He returned to Bangladesh in November 2018 and was arrested in Chittagong, accused in as many as 25 cases involving serious charges such as murder, smuggling, and vandalism. A Chandpur court sent him to jail, and over subsequent months, he was granted bail in many of those cases while some remained unresolved.

=== Involvement and views ===
In recent years, Milon has continued to engage in public discourse and education initiatives. In February 2025, as director of the ADUST Skill Development Institute, he spoke at a workshop urging youth to embrace technology and entrepreneurship in nation-building.

In May 2025, he publicly criticized the interim government's inefficiency and called for swift elections. Addressing students, he emphasized the importance of balancing activism with academic and moral development.

=== Minister for Education (2026–present) ===
Following the formation of the government led by Tarique Rahman, Milan was sworn in on 17 February 2026 as the minister for education and minister for primary and mass education. After assuming office, he pledged to reform Bangladesh's education system and restore its academic standards.

==== Controversy over HSC 2026 exam conducts ====
In July 2026, Milan faced widespread criticism after the government decided to proceed with the Higher Secondary Certificate (HSC) and equivalent examinations despite severe weather conditions affecting many parts of the country. The decision prompted criticism on social media and from political figures, with calls for postponement of the examinations. Many notable non-political political figures and organizations came in support of the criticism. At last, on 13 July, a mass protest began against him for his decision to continue the HSC exam. Because in the context of mass floods over the country, students were concerned. In a call record, he mentioned the students as 'broiler chicken'. That's why students called for his resignation.

The Bangladesh Inter-Education Board Coordination Committee, the government body responsible for coordinating HSC and equivalent examinations, issued an official statement signed by its president in response to the criticism. The committee stated that the decision was based on reports from local administrations, which indicated that most examination centres remained operational, which showed a severe lack of information as students were found participating in exams at flooded exam centres. It also cited the use of a common question paper across all education boards and warned that postponing the examinations could disrupt the education calendar and university admission schedule despite the fact that one of the largest board, Chittagong board's examination was already postponed at the time and continuing later with them was totally a viable option.The statement added that Deputy Commissioners (DCs) and Upazila Nirbahi Officers (UNOs) were authorized to take necessary measures if conditions worsened.

HSC 2026 controversy became more notable for its consistent faulty questions, especially in science group. English version students happened to suffer the most due to multiple translation errors in almost all exams. The minister along with the board even though admitted to the severe inconsistencies regarding the Physics first paper exam, remained in denial for most other exams.
