= Bangladesh Krishi Bank =

Government owned bank in Bangladesh

- Type: Government owned
- Industry: Banking
- Founded: 1973 in Dhaka, Bangladesh
- Headquarters: Dhaka, Bangladesh
- Key people: Md. Zahid Hossain (Chairman); Sanchia Binte Ali (Managing Director)
- Products: Banking services Consumer Banking; Corporate Banking; Investment Banking
- Net income: ▲
- Website: krishibank.gov.bd

Bangladesh Krishi Bank (Bengali: বাংলাদেশ কৃষি ব্যাংক) is a fully government owned bank in Bangladesh founded in 1973. The primary purpose of the bank is to provide services to farmers and agricultural industry. Rajshahi Krishi Unnayan Bank is the other state owned agriculture bank in Bangladesh.

== History ==
Krishi Bank was established in 1973.

Krishi Bank is one of six state owned banks in Bangladesh. In 2006, the bank was ordered to ensure 2 per cent interest on loans to farmers. On 16 November 2006, M Fazlul Haque was appointed managing director of the Bank.

On 30 January 2008, Khondkar Ibrahim Khaled was appointed chairman of the Bangladesh Krishi Bank and Md Mukter Hussain was appointed the managing director of Bangladesh Krishi Bank. In 2009, it had 952 branches which is the highest number of branches for banks in Bangladesh.

The bank was asked to stop providing loans to non-agricultural purposes. The Bank provided 19.26 billion taka loans for non-agricultural purposes from 2010 to 2013.

In December 2014, four Bangladesh Krishi Bank officials have faced investigations from the Anti-Corruption Commission. The four were accused of providing a fraudulent loan to restaurateur Wahidur Rahman, owner of Firoz Group, for 1.52 billion taka.

In 2015, the Bangladesh Krishi Bank incurred a loss of 1589.3 million taka. The Bank worked with the Department of Agricultural Extension in Netrokona District to provide loans to Boro rice Cultivators. The Moulvibazar branch of the bank was robbed of over 600 thousand taka.

Sanchia Binte Ali was appointed managing director of Bangladesh Krishi Bank.

In November 2017, Anti Corruption Commission sued six including three officers of the bank for embezzling 4.3 billion taka with the owners of M/S RN Sweaters.

Anti-Corruption Commission sued 6 officials of Bangladesh Krishi Bank and Wahidur Rahman in August 2018 for embezzling 1.52 billion taka from 2009 to 2013.

Justices M Enayetur Rahim and Sardar Md Rashed Jahangir asked the bank to explain why the bank had waived 480 taka interest on a loan to businessman and Bangladesh Nationalist Party politician Abbas Ali in May 2021. It was one of nine banks making a loss in the first quarter of 2021 in Bangladesh. It had the highest loss at 7.74 billion taka. The other banks were BASIC Bank Limited, Bangladesh Commerce Bank Limited, Bangladesh Development Bank, ICB Islamic Bank, Meghna Bank, NRB Bank, Padma Bank Limited, and Rajshahi Krishi Unnayan Bank. On 16 August, Shirin Akhter was appointed managing director of the bank. After Shirin retired, she joined the Karmasangsthan Bank in December 2021.

Bangladesh Krishi Bank asked for deposits from State owned enterprises. In June 2022, it had the highest capital shortfall in Bangladesh with 128.77 billion taka. It received an appreciation letter for distributing loans from the Bangladesh Bank. The Bank donated 10 million taka to the relief fund of Prime Minister Sheikh Hasina.

== Board of directors ==
Name	Position	Reference
Mohammed Nurul Amin	Chairman	
Sanchia Binte Ali	Managing Director	
Anwar Faruque	Director	
Mohammad Abul Hashem	Director	
Dr. Md. Idris Miah	Director	
Maksuma Akter Banu	Director	
Md. Saiful Islam	Director	
