= A. K. S. M. Shahidul Islam =

Bangladeshi politician

Member of Bangladesh Parliament
- In office 1988–1991
- Preceded by: Rafiqul Islam Roni
- Succeeded by: Mesbah Uddin

Personal details
- Party: Jatiya Party (Ershad)

A. K. S. M. Shahidul Islam is a Jatiya Party (Ershad) politician in Bangladesh and a former member of parliament for Chandpur-1.

== Career ==
Islam was elected to parliament from Chandpur-1 as a Jatiya Party candidate in 1988.
