= Mahbub Ahmed =

Mahbub Ahmed is the former senior secretary of the Ministry of Finance. He is the former chairman of the Institute of Public Finance, Bangladesh. He is a former secretary of the Ministry of Commerce. He is a former secretary of the Ministry of Youth and Sports. He was a director of Bangladesh Bank.

== Early life ==
Ahmed completed his bachelor's degree and masters in economics at the University of Dhaka.

== Career ==
Ahmed joined the Bangladesh Civil Service as an Assistant Commissioner of Taxes in 1983.

From 2009 to 2012, Ahmed was the secretary of the Ministry of Youth and Sports. In October, he was appointed Secretary of the Ministry of Commerce. He was the president of the Bangladesh Amateur Boxing Federation till December 2012 when he was replaced by Khondokar Shawkat Hossain after Ahmed was appointed Secretary of the Ministry of Commerce. He signed an agreement with Indian government for recognition of certification by the Bangladesh Standards and Testing Institution.

As commerce secretary, Ahmed had to deal with the fallout from the 2012 Dhaka garment factory fire and Rana Plaza collapse, and their impact on garment exports to the European Union and the United States. The United States removed Generalised System of Preferences for Bangladesh. He represented Bangladesh in trade negotiations with Myanmar. He signed Trade and Investment Cooperation Forum Agreement on behalf of Bangladesh with the United States.

On 6 July 2014, Ahmed was appointed secretary of the Ministry of Finance replacing Fazle Kabir. In March 2016, Ahmed was appointed director of Bangladesh Bank. Ahmed stepped down as the Finance Secretary in December 2016. In February 2017, Ahmed's term as the alternative executive director to the Asian Development Bank was extended by 15 months. In March, Hedayetullah Al Mamoon replaced him as Secretary of the Ministry of Finance.

In 2023, Ahmed called for the publication of a semiannual monetary policy statement.
