= Salim Mahmud =

Bangladeshi politician (born 1971)

Member of the Bangladesh Parliament for Chandpur-1
- In office 10 January 2024 – 6 August 2024
- Preceded by: Muhiuddin Khan Alamgir

Personal details
- Born: 14 September 1971 (age 54)
- Party: Awami League

Salim Mahmud (born 14 September 1971) is a Awami League politician and a former Jatiya Sangsad member representing the Chandpur-1 constituency in 2024.

== Career ==
Mahmud was elected to parliament from Chandpur-1 as an Awami League candidate on 7 January 2024.
