= Akania, Dakshin Kachua =

Akania
- Location within Chittagong division Location within Bangladesh
- Coordinates: 23°21′15″N 90°53′08″E
- Country: Bangladesh
- Division: Chittagong Division
- District: Chandpur District
- Upazila: Kachua
- Union council: Dakshin Kachua

Population (2011)
  - Total: 2,773
- Time zone: UTC+6 (Bangladesh Time)

Akania (Bengali: আকানিয়া ākāniyā) is a village in the Chittagong Division of eastern Bangladesh. It is part of the union council Dakshin Kachua of Kachua Upazila, in the district of Chandpur. Administratively, it constitutes a mauza, which includes the villages of Akania (population of 2,628) and Rasulpur (145).

An accident in August 2007 resulted in the death of two children in the village.
