= Sonali Bank =

State-owned Bangladeshi commercial banking institution

Sonali Bank PLC. সোনালী ব্যাংক পিএলসি
- Crest of Sonali Bank
- Native name: সোনালী ব্যাংক পিএলসি
- Type: Public Limited Company
- Industry: Banking; Financial services
- Predecessors: National Bank of Pakistan, Bank of Bahawalpur, and Premier Bank
- Founded: 1972; 54 years ago
- Headquarters: Motijheel, Dhaka, Bangladesh
- Area served: Bangladesh & Overseas
- Key people: Muhammed Mahbubur Rahman (chairman)
- Products: Finance and insurance Consumer Banking; Corporate Banking; Investment Banking; Investment Management
- Revenue: ▲ ৳38.46 billion (US$310 million) (2023)
- Net income: ▲ ৳6.51 billion (US$53 million) (2023)
- Total assets: ▲ ৳1981.13 billion (US$16 billion) (December 2023)
- Number of employees: 18,257 (2023)
- Subsidiaries: Sonali Bangladesh (UK) Limited; Sonali Pay (UK) Limited
- Website: sonalibank.com.bd

Sonali Bank (SBPLC) (Bengali: সোনালী ব্যাংক (এসবিপিএলসি)) is a Bangladeshi state-owned commercial bank. It is the largest bank in the country.

As of 2026, Muhammed Mahbubur Rahman is the chairman of the Bank.

== History ==
Sonali Bank was established in 1972 under the Bangladesh Banks (Nationalisation) Order, through the amalgamation and nationalisation of the branches of National Bank of Pakistan, Bank of Bahawalpur, and Premier Bank branches located in East Pakistan until the 1971 Bangladesh War of Independence. When it was established, Sonali Bank had a paid up capital of 30 million taka.

From 1996 to 1999, Dr Atiur Rahman served as a director of Sonali Bank.

In 2001, its authorised and paid up capital were Tk 10 billion and Tk 3.272 billion, respectively. Presently, its authorised and paid up capital is Tk 10 billion and Tk 9 billion, respectively. The bank's reserve funds were Tk 60 million in 1979 and Tk 2.050 billion on 30 June 2000.

In 2007, Sonali Bank was converted into a public limited company and renamed to Sonali Bank Limited.

In 2008, Sonali Bank had a loss of nearly 40 billion taka but the managing director of the bank, S. A. Chowdhury, predicted the bank can make a profit within five years. On 22 May, BM Bakir Hossain, top union official of the Sonali Bank Employees Union, was sentenced to 13 years' jail and fined 1 million taka for corruption. He was also the president of Bangladesh Bank Employees Federation and joint secretary of the Bangladesh Jatiotabadi Sramik Dal.

In 2009, Quazi Baharul Islam was appointed chairman of Sonali Bank.

On 2 October 2010, Sonali Bank filed a loan default case against Dandy Dyeing Limited and its ten directors with Artha Rin Adalat-1. The directors of Dandy Dyeing Limited are Tarique Rahman, Arafat Rahman, Arafat's wife Sharmila Rahman Sithi, Arafat's daughter Zafia Rahman, Arafat's another daughter Zahia Rahman, Giasuddin Al Mamun, Mamun's wife Shahina Yasmine, Nasrin Iskander wife of Sayeed Iskander, Shafin Iskander, Shams Iskander, Kazi Galib Abdus Sattar and Sumaiya Iskander. The company had borrowed the money on 16 October 2001. Former Prime Minister and BNP head, Khaleda Zia was also accused in the case.

== Controversies ==
The top defaulters of bank in 2006 were Mahanagari Traders Limited, Fair Chemicals (Private) Limited, Khulna Newsprint Mills Limited, Chittagong Jute Manufacturing Company Limited, Shamsul Alamin Cotton Mills Limited, Imperial Dyeing and Hosiery Mills Limited, Jahanara Alamin Spinning, Bright Textile Industries, Bangladesh Textile Mills Corporation, Bangladesh Autorickshaw Chalak Samity, Maola Textile Mills, East West Property Development Limited, Lina Textile Industries, Beximco group, One Composite Mills limited, Riverside Leather and Footwear Limited, Desma Shoe Industries, Nawab Askari Jute Mills Limited, Alpha Tobacco Manufacturing Company Limited, and Bangladesh Petroleum Corporation.

From 2010 to 2012, Hallmark Group swindled 35 billion taka from Sonali Bank known as the Hallmark-Sonali Bank Loan Scam. Described by The Daily Star as "one of the worst financial scandal" in the history of Bangladesh. The loans were all given from its branch located at Ruposhi Bangla Hotel. 17 officers of the bank were suspended following the scam. ANM Mashrurul Huda, general manager, blew the whistle on the scam. Transparency International Bangladesh called for an investigation into the affair. Minister of Finance, Abul Maal Abdul Muhith, blamed members of Awami League of protecting scammers at Sonali and BASIC Bank Limited. Bangladesh Foreign Exchange Dealers' Association asked Sonali Bank to pay bills of Hallmark Group as the banks accepted the bills on Sonali Banks acceptance. Consultancy firm Syful Shamsul Alam and Co blamed Sonali Bank for the scam not being detected. AHM Habibur Rahman was appointed chairman of the bank replacing Quazi Baharul Islam. The Bank refused to reschedule loans of Hallmark Group.

In 2013, $250,000 was stolen from the bank by Cyber criminals using the SWIFT International payments network. In 2016, the Bank signed a Memorandum of Understanding with PayPal. It also signed an agreement with MoneyGram.

Bangladesh Bank appointed an observer to Sonali Bank in 2015. Observers were also appointed to Rupali Bank, Agrani Bank, and Janata Bank. In July 2015, robbers killed two security guards of Sonali Bank's branch in Kalaroa Upazila, Satkhira District.

Rapid Action Battalion stopped a robbery attempt at the Dhamrai branch of the bank killing one of the robbers in a shootout in 2016.

Former managing director of Sonali Bank, Pradip Kumar Dutta, was appointed managing director of The Farmers Bank in 2017.

On 14 February 2018, Chief Justice Syed Mahmud Hossain issued a verdict clearing allowing Sonali Bank to begin recruiting after some test takers had filed a petition alleging irregularities in the recruitment of 2200 officers for which 800 thousand applicants applied. Sheikh Fazle Noor Taposh represented the bank while the applicants were represented by Abdul Matin Khasru, A. M. Aminuddin, Quamrul Haque Siddique, and Rafiqur Rahman. The Minister of Finance, Abul Maal Abdul Muhith, identified government interference as one of the reasons behind the poor performance of Sonali Bank. The loan to deposit ratio of Sonali Bank was 42 percent in 2018. Sonali Bank proposed to the Ministry of Finance in December that it form a separate company take over the assets of loan defaulters after failing to auction the properties due to petitions filed at the High Court Division and Artha Rin Adalat. The bank had 265 billion taka assets stuck in courts of which 200 billion was stuck with the Artha Rin Adalat (money loan court).

Ziaul Hasan Siddiqui was appointed chairman of the Bank in August 2019. On 20 August, the managing director of Sonali Bank, Md Obayed Ullah Al Masud, was made the managing director of Rupali Bank and the managing director of Rupali Bank, Md. Ataur Rahman Prodhan, was made the managing director of Sonali Bank. In November 2019, the Anti Corruption Commission arrested a retired employee of the bank on charges of embezzling 18.4 million taka from the bank.

On 25 May 2022, seven for officials of Sonali Bank and two businessmen from Hallmark Group were sentenced to 17 years for embezzlement. On 24 July, the former managing director of the bank, Humayun Kabir, was sentenced to 17 years' jail and two other officials were sentenced to various terms for embezzling 12.5 million taka from the bank. Md Afzal Karim was appointed managing director of Sonali Bank in August 2022.

In June 2022, the Anti-Corruption Commission (ACC) filed a case against 21 individuals, including directors of One Spinning Mills Ltd. such as AHM Jahangir (alias Abu Hasan Muhammad Jahangir) and managing director Giasuddin Al Mamun - close associates of BNP acting chairperson Tarique Rahman for embezzling Tk 32.67 crore through fraudulent loans and irregular documentation issued in 2004.

== Branches ==
Sonali Bank has a total of 1,235 branches. Out of them, 467 are located in urban areas, 746 in rural areas, and 2 are located overseas. It also operates the Sonali Exchange Company Inc. in USA, Sonali Exchange in Dubai (UAE), Sonali Bank (UK) Ltd., United Kingdom, Hong Kong, (HAR), and Singapore to facilitate foreign exchange remittances. Sonali Bank UK remits up to 25 destinations across Bangladesh directly, these include Dhaka, Chittagong, Sylhet, Moulvibazar, Beanibazar, Balaganj, Biswanath, Jagannathpur, Sunamganj, Gopalganj, Nabiganj Upazila, Hobigonj, Kulaura, Tajpur.

=== Overseas ===
==== United States ====
There are currently four in the US in Washington DC, New York, Chicago and Los Angeles. Bangladesh Bank ordered Sonali Bank to close its United States–based exchange company, Sonali Exchange Company Incorporation, due to losses in 2018.

==== United Kingdom ====
There are four branches in the UK, one located in Osborn Street, in London, another in Small Heath; Birmingham and in Manchester. It was fined 3.5 million GBP by the Financial Conduct Authority for money laundering offences and working with a politically exposed person in 2016. The branch was briefly closed in 1998. Sonali Bank sought permission from Bangladesh Bank to send 1.71 billion taka to the United Kingdom branch in 2017. It was on the brink of bankruptcy with transactions suspended by the Royal Bank of Scotland.

==== India ====
There are two branches in India, one in Kolkata and others in Siliguri of West Bengal state of India. It received permission to inject 500 million taka into its Kolkata branch as fresh funds.

== Islamic banking ==
In 2010, Islamic banking was launched in 5 branches of different districts of the country through Sonali Bank. In 2009, again Islami banking was launched in six other branches of Sonali Bank in different districts across the country.

== Board of directors ==
Name	Position	Reference
Muhammed Mahbubur Rahman	Chairman	
Mohammad Muslim Chowdhury	Chairman	
A. B. M. Ruhul Azad	Director	
A. K. M. Kamrul Islam	Director	
Ishtiaque Ahmed Chowdhury	Director	
Daulatunnaher Khanam	Director	
Molla Abdul Wadud	Director	
Mohammad Kaykobad	Director	
Md. Matiur Rahman	Director	
Abul Kalam Azad	Director	
Md. Shawkat Ali Khan	Chief executive officer and Managing Director	
