= Ibrahim Ujani =

Bengali Islamic scholar

Mawlana Qari Muhammad Ibrahim Ujani
- ইব্রাহীম উজানী

Personal life
- Born: 1863 Nalua, Noakhali, Bengal Presidency
- Died: 1943 (aged 79–80) Ujani, Chandpur
- Children: 18
- Parent: Muhammad Panah Mian (father)
- Notable work: Jamia Islamia Ibrahimia
- Education: Calcutta Alia Madrasa; Madrasah as-Sawlatiyah
- Relatives: Tajul Islam (son-in-law)

Religious life
- Religion: Islam
- Denomination: Sunni
- Jurisprudence: Hanafi
- Tariqa: Chishti (Sabiri-Imdadi)
- Creed: Maturidi
- Movement: Deobandi

Muslim leader
- Teacher: Qari Baraksus
- Disciple of: Rashid Ahmad Gangohi
- Disciples: Syed Muhammad Ishaq

Muhammad Ibrahim Ujani (Bengali: মুহম্মদ ইব্রাহীম উজানী; 1863 – 1943) was a Bengali Deobandi scholar and founder of the Jamia Islamia Ibrahimia. He was a senior disciple of Rashid Ahmad Gangohi, and his khalifa Syed Muhammad Ishaq was the founder of the Charmonai Darbar.

== Early life and education ==
Ibrahim was born in 1863, to a Bengali Muslim family in the village of Nalua in Noakhali, Bengal Presidency. His father's name was Muhammad Panah Mian. His primary education began in his own neighbourhood, where he studied Arabic and Persian. He later studied at the Calcutta Alia Madrasa, before enrolling at the Madrasah as-Sawlatiyah in Mecca, Arabia. In Mecca, he studied qiraʼat under the Turkish scholar Qari Baraksus.

== Career ==
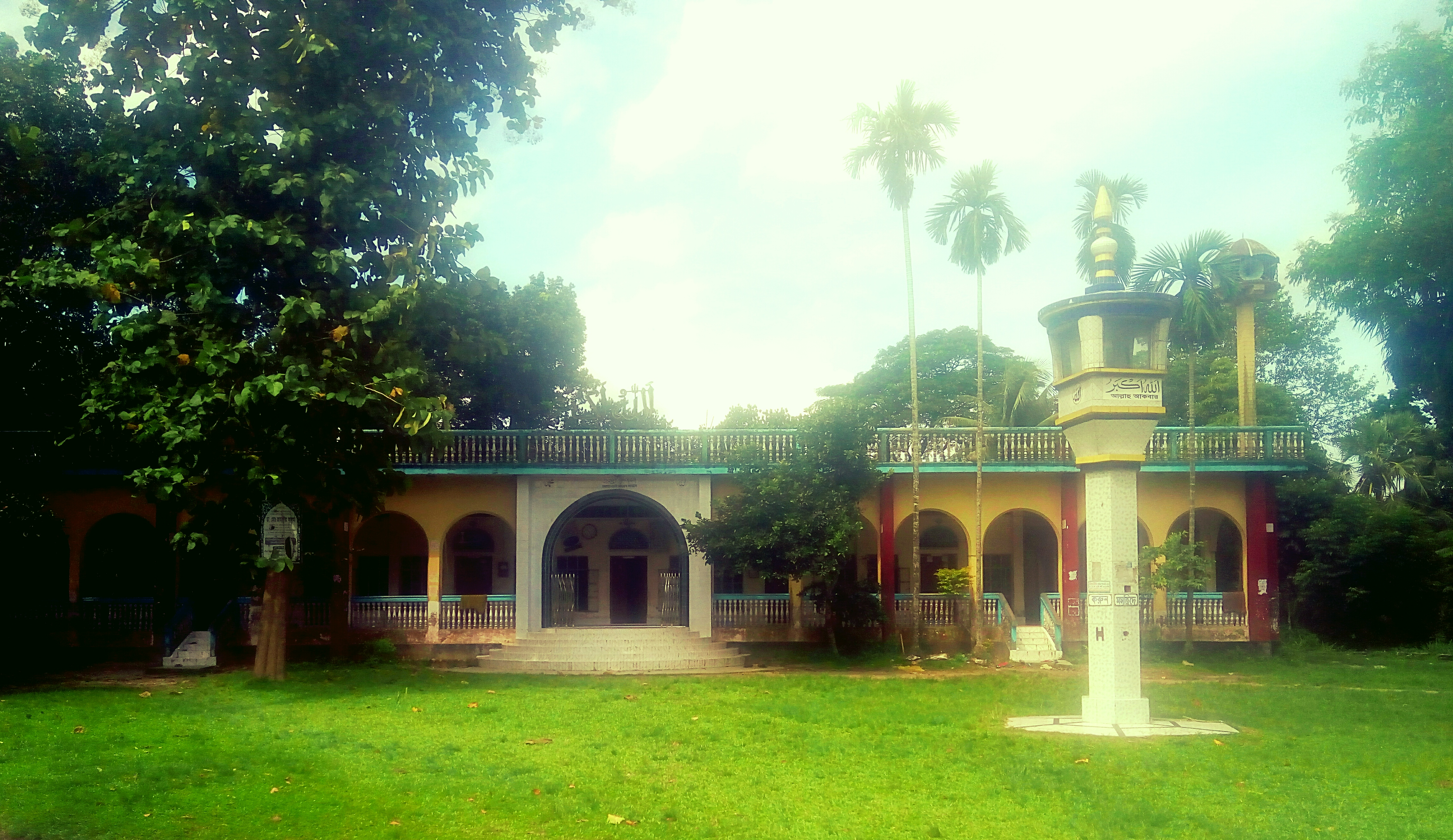
The ancient Bakhtiyar Khan Mosque in Ujani became the headquarters of Ibrahim's activities.

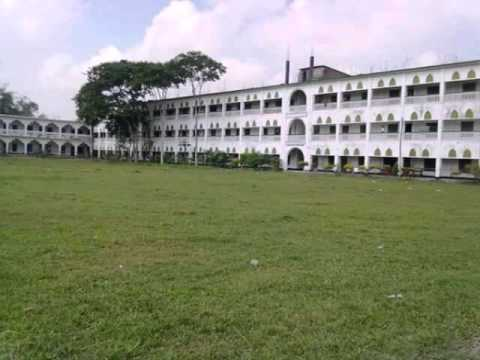
Jamia Islamia Ibrahimia, also known as Ujani Madrasa, now holds over 1200 students.

Whilst in Mecca, Ibrahim's recitation of the Qur'an was heard by the governor of Mecca who instructed him to become a teacher at Madrasah as-Sawlatiyah. Ibrahim served there for 12 years as a teacher. He later returned to Bengal, where he settled in Chandpur, where one of his wives was from Banu Tamim, one of the daughters of governor of Makkah. In 1901, he established a mosque and the Jamia Islamia Ibrahimia in Ujani. He also pledged bay'ah to Rashid Ahmad Gangohi. 12 days later, Gangohi granted Ibrahim the khilafah (mystic succession).

== Death and legacy ==
Ujani died in his home in Kachua, Chandpur in 1943. He was married to a woman from Mecca during his time as a teacher there, who joined him when he returned to Bengal. He was also married to girl from Daulatpur whose father had heard him reciting at a Quranic event there. He had 11 sons and 7 daughters. His disciple, Syed Muhammad Ishaq, was the founder of the Charmonai Darbar.

== See also ==
- List of Deobandis
