= Dandy Dyeing Limited =

Bangladeshi company

Dandy Dyeing Limited is a dyeing company owned by the family of former prime minister of Bangladesh Khaleda Zia. The company and former prime minister Khaleda Zia, her sons, Tarique Rahman, and Arafat Rahman, were sued by Sonali Bank on charges of defaulting on a loan. According to Prime Minister Sheikh Hasina the company owed 400 million BDT to state-owned Sonali Bank.

== History ==
Dandy Dyeing Limited was established in 1993 when the Bangladesh Nationalist Party was in power. It started with 30 million BDT in start-up capital. It was listed on the Dhaka Stock Exchange in 1995 and raised 31 million BDT from the market. It was a relatively successful company when Khaleda Zia was prime minister and the Bangladesh Nationalist Party was in power.

On 14 September 1996, the Bureau of Anti-Corruption (predecessor to the Anti-Corruption Commission) sued Tarique Rahman, son of former prime minister Khaleda Zia, and four others over a loan taken by Dandy Dyeing Limited using false evaluation of assets. Judge Mohammad Rezaul Karim Khan fixed January 2005 as the start of the trial for the case.

In the early 2000s, commercials by Dandy Dyeing Limited were seen in all television channels. This changed in 2006 when the Bangladesh Nationalist Party lost power. Directors of the company were either in jail, in exile, or dead.

In 2009, Finance Minister Abul Maal Abdul Muhith disclosed to the parliament that Dandy Dyeing Limited received 121.6 million BDT interest waiver after the Bangladesh Nationalist Party came to power in 2001.

Dandy Dyeing Limited lost 148.8 million BDT in 2010 and had 66.2 million in net liabilities. In the early 2010s, Dandy Dyeing Limited was placed in the over-the-counter board. After the board was abolished in 2019, Dandy went to the alternative trading board.

On 2 October 2010, Sonali Bank filed a loan default case against Dandy Dyeing Limited and its ten directors with Artha Rin Adalat-1. The directors of Dandy Dyeing Limited are Tarique Rahman, Arafat Rahman, Arafat's wife Sharmila Rahman Sithi, Arafat's daughter Zafia Rahman, Arafat's another daughter Zahia Rahman, Giasuddin Al Mamun, Mamun's wife Shahina Yasmine, Nasrin Iskander wife of Sayeed Iskander, Shafin Iskander, Shams Iskander, Kazi Galib Abdus Sattar and Sumaiya Iskander. The company had burrowed the money on 16 October 2001. Former prime minister Khaleda Zia was also an accused in the case. Judge Md Rabiuzzaman appointment lawyers to settle the dispute between creditors and the directors of the company. Arafat Rahman died in Malaysia in 2010.

In October 2013, the liabilities of the company were 455.9 million BDT. In February 2020, Bangladesh Securities and Exchange Commission asked about the status of Dandy Dyeing Limited.

In February 2016, the trial of loan default case against directors of Dandy Dyeing and former prime minister Khaleda Zia began in 2016 under Judge Fatema Ferdous in the Artha Rin Adalat-1.
