= Akania Nasirpur =

- Location within Chittagong division Location within Bangladesh
- Coordinates: 23°17′39″N 90°54′21″E
- Country: Bangladesh
- Division: Chittagong Division
- District: Chandpur District
- Upazila: Kachua
- Union council: Karaia

Population (2011)
  - Total: 5,275
- Time zone: UTC+6 (Bangladesh Time)

Akania Nasirpur is a village in Chandpur District in the Chittagong Division of eastern Bangladesh. It is located within Karaia union council in Kachua Upazila. Administratively, it is a mauza made up of two villages: Akania (population of 4,006) and Nasirpur (1,269). There is one secondary school in the village, Akania Nasirpur High School.
