= Munshibari family of Comilla =

Munshibari Estate
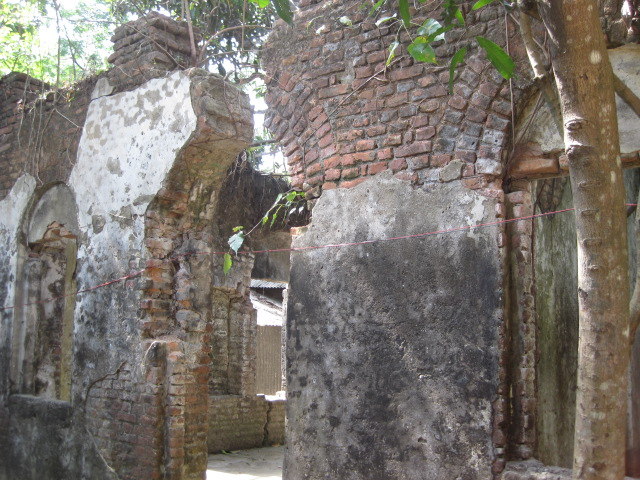
- Ruins of the mansion's southern facade

General information
- Type: Manor
- Architectural style: Indo-Saracenic
- Location: Bangladesh
- Construction started: 1780

The Munshibari (Bengali: মুন্সীবাড়ী) estate was established in the 18th century in Bengal (present day Chandpur District, Chittagong Division in Bangladesh). It was held by a family of Munshis.

The family was of Turkish descent and was subinfeudated under the rulers of Bengal, on behalf of whom they collected land revenues in the area. In the 19th century, the family traded jute with the British East India Company. They built mosques, schools, and other structures around the estate which still stand today in their homestead of Taltoli.

== History ==
=== 18th-19th centuries ===
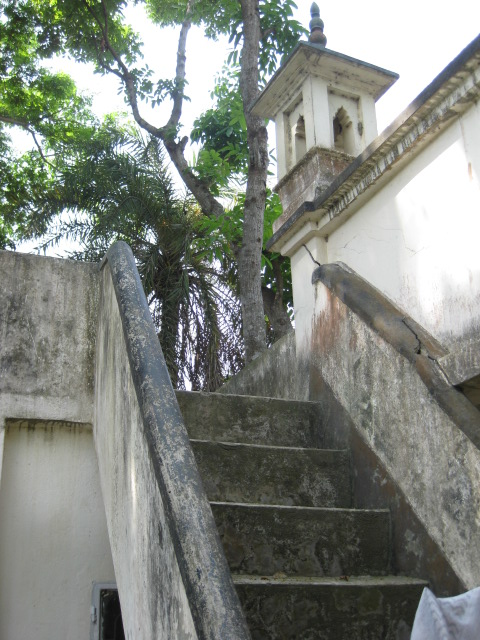
Partial ruins of the eastern wing of the Munshibari Jama Masjid.

During the 17th and 18th centuries, merchants and clerics from around the world came to India. Various groups such as the Arabs preached Islam, while the Europeans traded silks and spices in various provinces. The ancestors of the clan were from Eastern Turkey and were named Et'tin. Although they were traders at first, land grants (Jagirs) enabled them to live off of the shares of the Empire's revenue and taxes from the lands. Earlier revenue collectors in Bengal, Bihar and Orissa had been functionaries who held the right to collect revenue on behalf of the Emperor and his representative, or diwan in Bengal (Nawabs of Bengal). The diwan supervised the tax collectors to ensure that they were neither lax nor overly stringent. When the East India Company was awarded the Diwani or overlordship of Bengal by the empire in 1764, it found itself short of trained administrators, especially those familiar with local customs and law. As a result, landholders were unsupervised or they reported to corrupt and indolent officials. The result was that revenues were extracted without regard for future income or local welfare.

Following the devastating famine of 1770, which was partially caused by this short-sightedness, Company officials in Calcutta better understood the importance of oversight of revenue officials. They failed to consider the question of incentivisation; hence Warren Hastings, then governor-general, introduced a system of five-yearly inspections and temporary tax farmers. It is in this time, that a lot of foreign merchants and traders, well versed in reading, writing and account-keeping were employed by the British to collect revenue and maintain order. The title Munshi therefore denotes the family's role in teaching native languages such as Urdu, Hindi, Persian and Bengali or as secretaries to the Europeans. There were possible intermarriages with the British during this period.

=== 19th-20th centuries ===
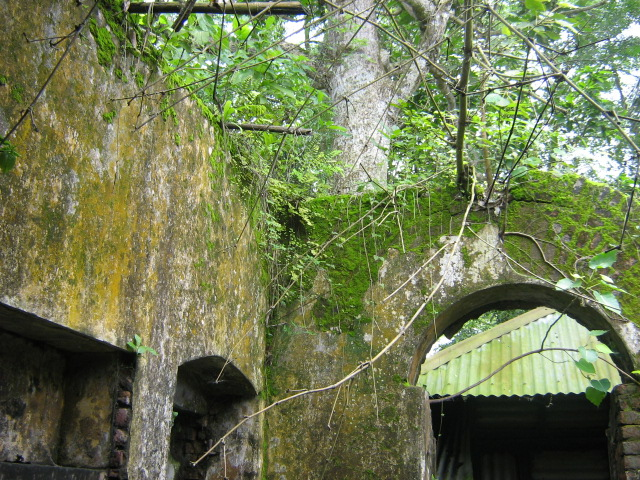
Moss-covered ruins of the Munshibari mansion during the monsoon.

In the mid-19th century, the family traded produce from the lands around the estate, Jute was one of the primary commodities, sold in Narayanganj. Jute has been grown in the Indian subcontinent for centuries. It was produced for domestic consumption in the villages of East Bengal. However, jute fibre samples were sent to the United Kingdom strictly for experimentation related to mechanical processing. The breakthrough came in 1833, when jute fibre was spun mechanically in Dundee, Scotland. This was the harbinger of the world's jute era. A jute industry soon mushroomed all over Western Europe with Dundee as its main centre. The first Indian Jute mill was constructed in 1855 at Rishra. By the early 20th century the Calcutta Jute industry surpassed the European Jute industry. The family employed and intermixed with local muslim Beparis. Bangladesh became the largest exporter of raw jute in the world.

== Estate ==
Ruins of the Munshibari Residence

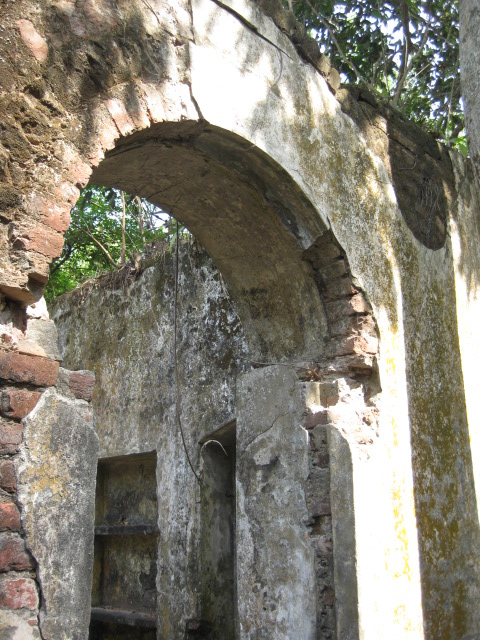

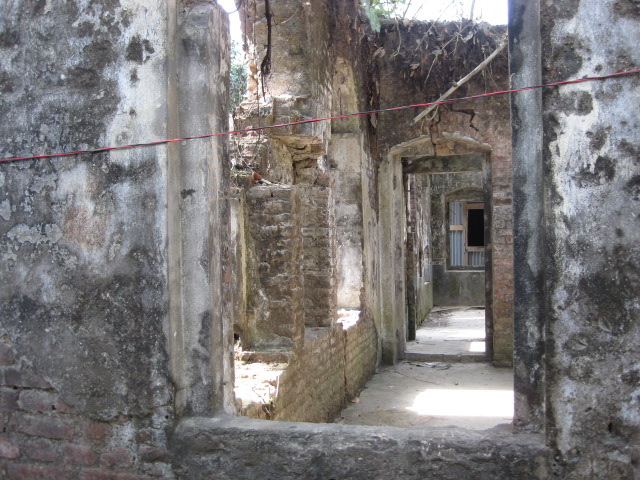

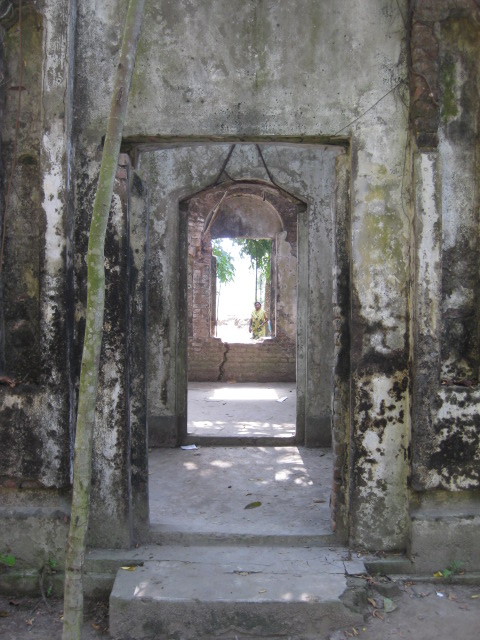

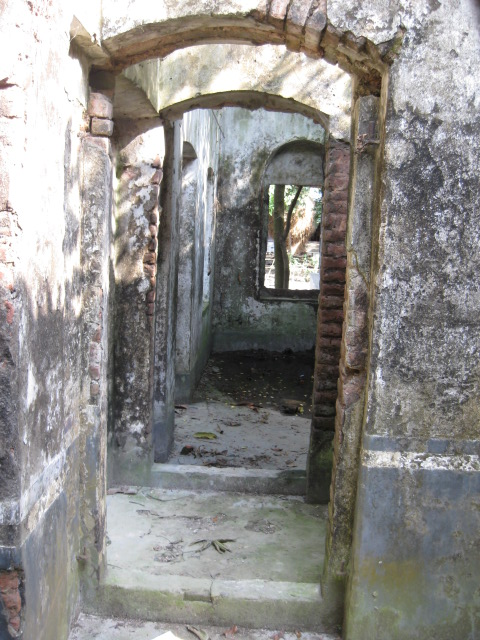

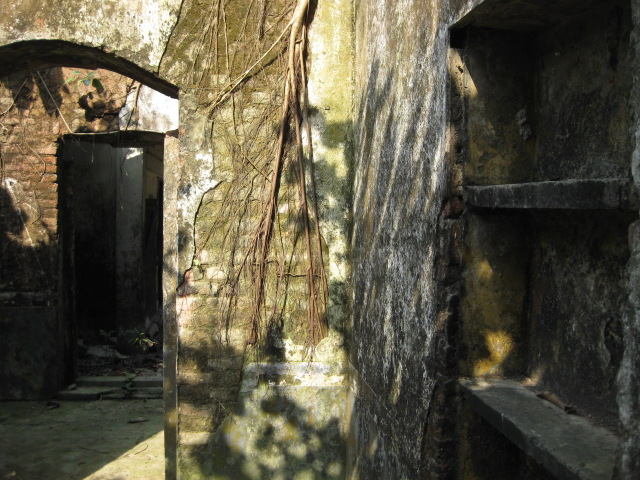

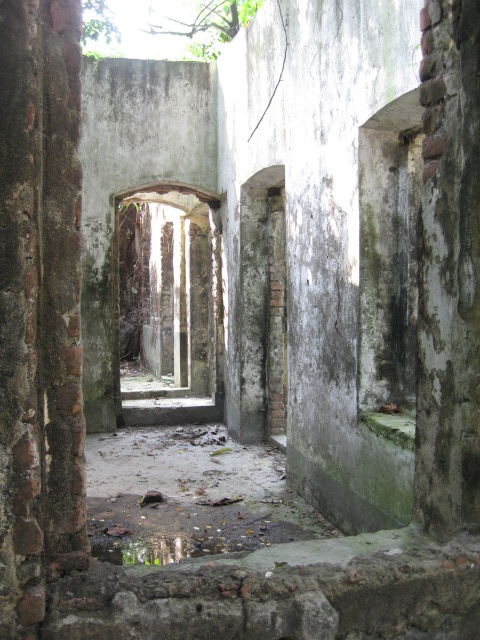

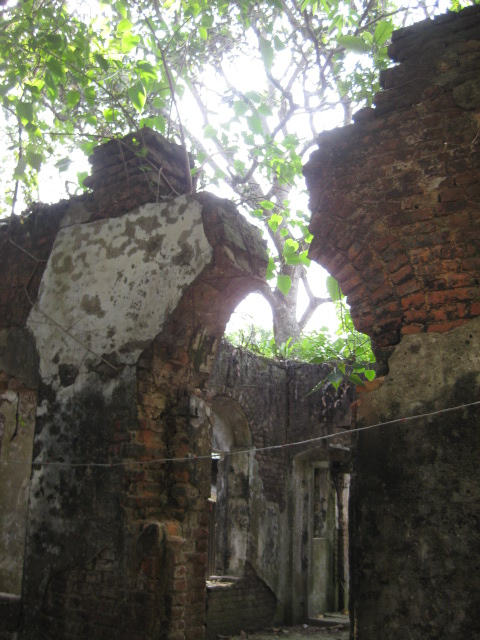

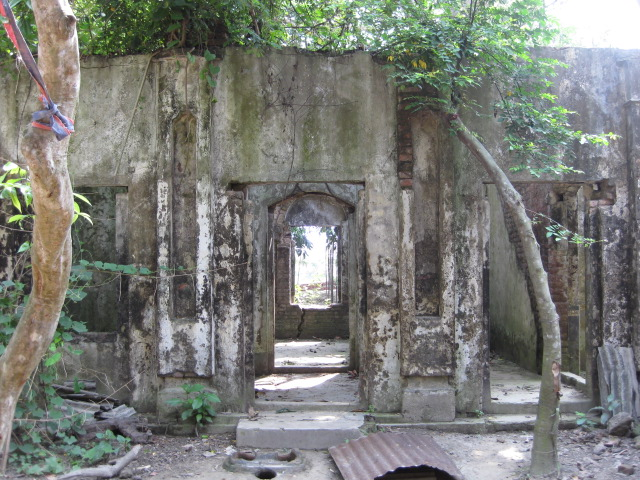

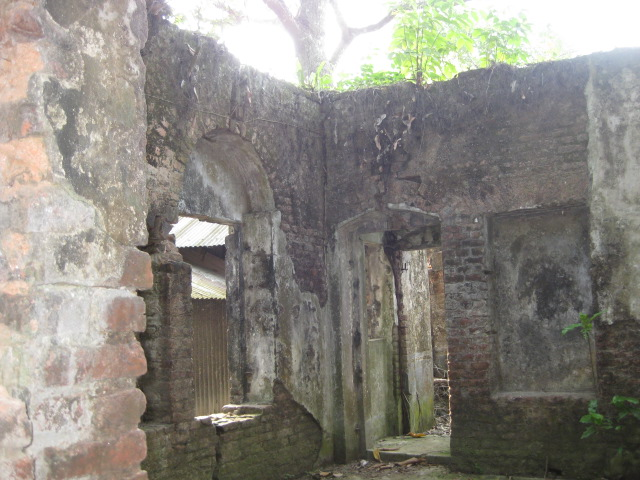

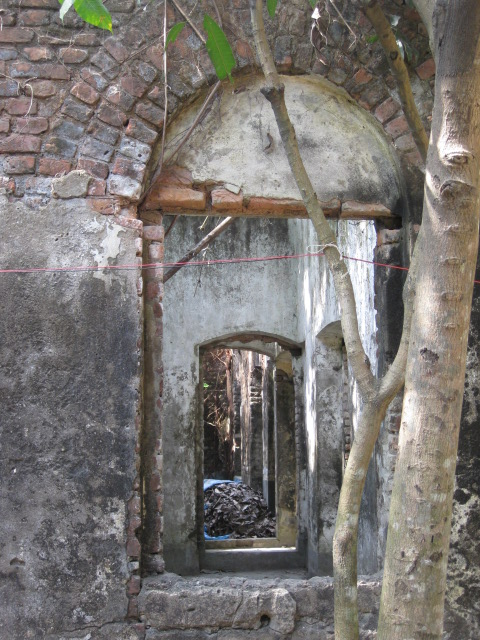

== Philanthropy ==
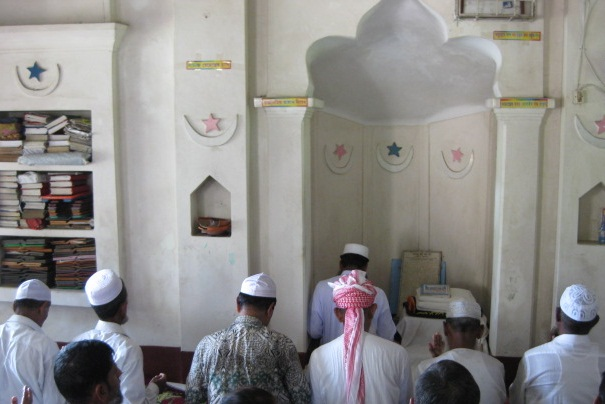
The Imam and Muezzin pray during weekly Jumu'ah congregation. Note the Turkish Emblems around the mosques interior

The Munshibari Jama Masjid was established in the region as local Muslims had nowhere to pray. It was completed in British India, in 1891 by Huss'eyn ud-Din Munshi alongside a pond owned by the Munshibari family. Built by local masons, the structure is of Indo-Saracenic and Indo-Islamic blend. It has four minarets (or manārah مناره) in four corners of the structure, a hallway, the Mihrab (محراب) in the main prayer room (musallah). The Mihrab also has a Minbar (منبر) for regional khatibs (خطيب) to deliver sermons (khutbah; خطبة) The exterior has a corridor by the pond for ritual purification (Wudu; الوضوء). The stairs lead to the top of the mosque. The structure also houses a living quarter for Islamic scholars and a carved in library in the main hall for scriptures used during Madrasah (مدرسة) lessons. Since the late 19th century, the Imams (أئمة) and Muezzins (مؤذن) called on the local Muslims to the congregational mosque (then known as the Munshibari Masjid), where Jumu'ah (صلاة الجمعة) or weekly Friday noon (Dhuhr; صلاة الظهر) congregation prayers took place.

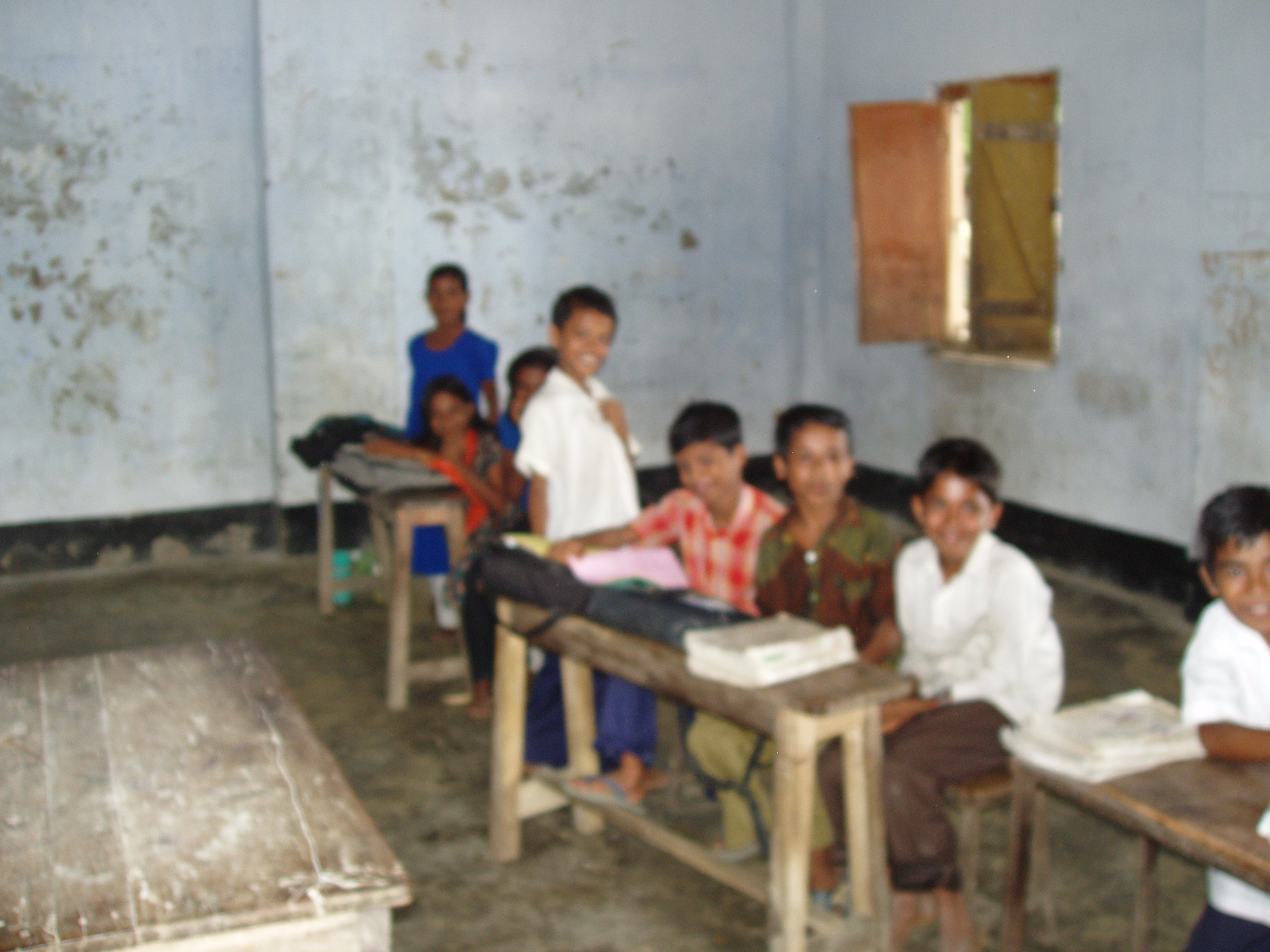
Typical classroom for local schoolboys at Taltoli Public Primary School

The family also established the first school called Taltoli Public Primary School for the Muslim population living on the estate. It was named after Bilayet-un-Nissa, the wife of Ab'dul Hamid Munshi, a member of the family, who made a school for her because she wanted to attend lessons outside of the residence. In the 1850s Muslim women were not allowed to regularly visit outside of the private quarters of the residences.

The family employed regional teachers, first starting with lessons in Urdu, Persian, and Arabic delivered by Islamic teachers from the family mosque. After the war of 1971, the government of Bangladesh took over the school and declared it a public institution under the curriculum of the Ministry of Education.

== See also ==
- Prithimpassa Family

== Sources ==
- "Munshibari Estate: Quiet and isolated". Daily Sun. Archived from the original on 2014-10-26.
- This article incorporates text in the public domain from the National Archives of Bangladesh.
