= Jamia Islamia Ibrahimia =

Jamia Islamia Ibrahimia Ujani
- Ujani Ibrahimia Madrasa
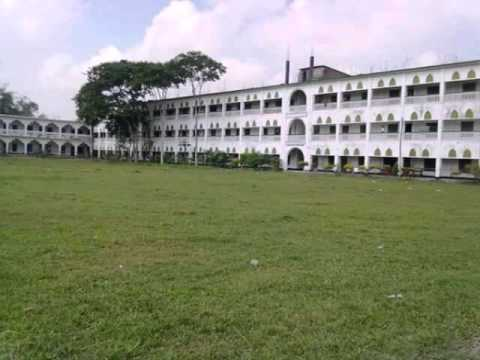
- Type: Islamic university
- Established: 1901
- Founders: Ibrahim Ujani
- Academic staff: 35
- Administrative staff: 12
- Students: 1200+
- Undergraduates: Befaqul Madarisil Arabia Bangladesh
- Location: Ujani, Kachua Upazila, Chandpur, Bangladesh

Al-Jāmiʿah al-Islāmiyyah al-Ibrāhīmiyyah (Arabic: الجامعة الإسلامية الإبراهيمية), also known simply as Jamia Islamia Ibrahimia and popularly as the Ujani Madrassah (Bengali: উজানী মাদ্রাসা), is a Qawmi jamia in Kachua upazila of Chandpur. It was established in 1901 by Qari Ibrahim Ujani, a student of Rashid Ahmad Gangohi.

== Management ==
Based on the principle of Darul Uloom Deoband, the jamia has been offering religious education on the basis of the help and support of the Muslim community. The activities if the jamia are executed under the leadership of principal through Majlish-e Shura and Majlish-e Aamela.

== Education system ==
Jamia Islamia Ibrahimia Ujani offers Islamic education from the initial level up to the highest level. The educational activities of the jamia are being conducted under the Qawmi Madrasah Education Board Befaqul Madarisil Arabia Bangladesh. The madrasa has the following dept.s of higher education.

- Dept of Hadith
- Dept of Qiraat
- Dept of Fatwa

This madrasa has got special fame across the country for the Qiraat Dept.

== See also ==
- Al-Jamiatul Arabia Haildhar Madrasa
- Al-Haiatul Ulya Lil-Jamiatil Qawmia Bangladesh
- Nurul Islam Olipuri
- Muhibbullah Babunagari
