= Rafiqul Islam Roni =

Bangladeshi politician

Member of Bangladesh Parliament
- In office 1986–1988
- Succeeded by: A. K. S. M. Shahidul Islam

Personal details
- Party: Jatiya Party (Ershad)

Rafiqul Islam Roni is a Jatiya Party (Ershad) politician and a former member of parliament for Chandpur-1.

== Career ==
Roni was elected to parliament from Chandpur-1 as a Jatiya Party candidate in 1986.
