= Burhanuddin Khan Jahangir =

Bangladeshi academic and writer (1936–2020)

- বোরহানউদ্দিন খান জাহাঙ্গীর
- Born: 9 January 1936; Gulbahar, Kachua Upazila, Chandpur, Bengal Presidency, British India
- Died: 23 March 2020 (aged 84); Dhaka, Bangladesh
- Education: Dhaka College; University of Dhaka

Burhanuddin Khan Jahangir (9 January 1936 – 23 March 2020) was a Bangladeshi academic and writer. He was awarded the Bangla Academy Literary Award in 1969 and the Ekushey Padak in 2009.

== Education ==
Jahangir completed his matriculation exam in 1950 from Muslim Government High School, Dhaka and intermediate exam in 1952 from Dhaka College. He obtained his bachelor's degree and master's degree in political science from the University of Dhaka in 1955 and 1956 respectively. He got his Ph.D. from Durham University in 1974.

== Career ==
Jahangir started his career at the University of Dhaka as a lecturer in 1956 and retired in 1994.

=== Awards ===
- Ekushey Padak (2009)
- Bangla Academy Literary Award (1969)
- Fruit of Honor by UNESCO and French Government
- Muzaffar Ahmed Memorial Award, Kolkata (20)
- Twenty-one medals in education and research (23)

== Death ==
Jahangir died at his residence in Gulshan, Dhaka on 23 March 2020 and was buried on 24 March at his family's graveyard at Kachua upazila of Chandpur District.
