= Exim Bank (Bangladesh) =

Commercial bank in Bangladesh

Export Import Bank of Bangladesh PLC.
- Type: Public
- Traded as: DSE: EXIMBANK; CSE: EXIMBANK
- Industry: Banking
- Founded: 3 August 1999
- Founder: Shahjahan Kabir
- Headquarters: Dhaka, Bangladesh
- Area served: 145 branches and 56 sub branches in Bangladesh (November 2022)
- Key people: Md. Nazrul Islam Swapan (Chairman); Mohammad Feroz Hossain (Managing director)
- Services: Banking; Financial services
- Number of employees: 3242 (2021)
- Website: www.eximbankbd.com

Export Import Bank of Bangladesh PLC. commonly known as EXIM Bank is one of the private commercial banks in Bangladesh. The Bank came into operation as a commercial bank on 3 August 1999 as per rules and regulations of Bangladesh Bank. From its establishment the bank was known as BEXIM Bank Limited. But due to legal constraints, the bank was renamed as EXIM Bank, which stood for Export Import Bank of Bangladesh Limited.

== History ==
EXIM Bank Limited was established in 1999, by Nazrul Islam Mazumder and Late Shahjahan Kabir. Nazrul Islam Mazumder was also elected as the Chairman of the Bank. The bank started functioning from 3 August 1999 with Alamgir Kabir, as the adviser and Mohammad Lakiotullah as the managing director. The bank started its operation with an initial authorised capital of Taka 1 billion (US$12.87 million) and paid up capital of Taka 225 million (US$2.9 million).

EXIM bank is the first bank in Bangladesh to have converted all of its operations of conventional banking into shariah-based banking, since July/2004. In 2007 about 80 students of different institutions like (DU, BUET, DMC, VNCS, and NDC) have taken scholarship. The bank sponsored the "Beautification Project" of Dhaka mega city conducted by Dhaka City Corporation. It organized a 630 million BDT loan for Outpace Spinning Mills Limited in October 2007. On 2009, the bank made history for being the first privately owned bank in Bangladesh to open an exchange house in the UK.

Since then the authorised and paid up capital remained unchanged till December 2000. Later, both were increased from time to time and their amounts stood at Tk.16.12 billion (US$207.31 million) and Tk.9.22 billion (US$118.7 million) respectively on 31 December 2011.

Mohammed Haider Ali Miah was appointed managing director of EXIM Bank in July 2012.

Mohammed Haider Ali Miah was reappointed managing director of EXIM Bank in July 2015.

In February 2019, Bangladesh Securities and Exchange Commission approved a 6 billion BDT bond issue by EXIM Bank. Mohammed Haider Ali Miah was reappointed managing director of EXIM Bank in July.

In May 2020, EXIM Bank sued two directors of Sikder Group, Ron Haque Sikder, and Dipu Haque Sikder, for assaulting two officials of the bank over a loan dispute. After an investigation by Detective Branch, the names of the two directors were dropped from the criminal case.

In March 2021, EXIM Bank announced plans to issue 6 billion BDT through issuing mudaraba perpetual bond.

Mohammad Firoz Hossain was appointed managing director of EXIM Bank in September.

In March 2024, The EXIM Bank and Padma Bank signed a MoU at the Bangladesh Bank (BB) headquarters, under which the EXIM Bank will 'take over' the Padma Bank. It is learnt that after the merger it will operate under the name EXIM Bank. However, on 24 December 2024, EXIM Bank and Padma Bank called off planned merger.

== EXIM Bank Foundation ==
EXIM Bank Scholarship Program was launched in the year 2006 with 61 poor meritorious students selected from different reputed educational institutions of Dhaka City including Government Laboratory High School, Viqarunnisa Noon School and College, Dhaka University, BUET, Dhaka Medical College, etc. Till 30 April 2013, they have enrolled as many as 2100 students from around 350 reputed educational institutions across the country.

EXIM Bank set up EXIM Bank Agricultural University Bangladesh (EBAUB), a private agricultural university at Chapainawabganj, Rajshahi.

A 5-storied building having 10,000 square feet of floor space at 840 Kazi Para, Rokeya Sarani, Mirpur, Dhaka-1216 has been hired to set up Exim Bank Hospital.

== Awards and achievements ==
- ICMAB Best Corporate Award 2013
- International "BIZZ Award −2013"
- International Diamond Prize for Excellence in Quality, a vanity award

== See also ==
- Islamic banking
