= ICB Islamic Bank =

Commercial bank in Bangladesh

- Formerly: Al-Baraka Bank (1987-2004); Oriental Bank (2004-2008)
- Company type: Private
- Industry: Banking
- Founded: 1987
- Headquarters: Dhaka, Bangladesh
- Area served: Bangladesh
- Key people: Mr. Aklif Bin Amir (Chairman); Mr. Md. Mazibur Rahman(MD & CEO)
- Services: Banking; Financial services
- Website: www.icbislamic-bd.com

ICB Islamic Bank is a second generation commercial Islamic Bank in Bangladesh listed on the Dhaka Stock Exchange. Mr. Md. Mazibur Rahman is the managing director of ICB Islamic Bank Limited.

== History ==
ICB Islamic Bank was established in 1987 and started operations on 20 May 1987 as Al-Baraka Bank. The bank listed on Dhaka Stock Exchange in 1990. By 1994, the bank ran into financial troubles. In 2004, the bank was reorganized and renamed to Oriental Bank.

In 2006, Bangladesh Bank dissolved Oriental Bank's board of directors and auctioned majority of the shares. The ICB Banking Group bought majority of the shares and renamed it ICB Islamic Bank in 2008.

In 2014, Bangladesh Bank rescheduled the payment plan of ICB Islamic Bank to the depositors' of Oriental Bank.

By 2018, ICB Islamic Bank had failed to return 4.44 billion taka to the depositors' of Oriental Bank, a condition set by Bangladesh bank, and sought a change in the repayment plan from the central bank.

In January 2021, seven officers of Oriental Bank were sentenced to jail for embezzlement. ICB Islamic Bank reduced staff salary due to losses. It suffered losses that year and the bottom line remained in the red.

ICB Islamic Bank had an accumulated loss of nearly 20 billion taka in 2022. The bank had been running at a loss for years and had failed to pay dividends to shareholders for the last few years. Bangladesh High Court summoned an investigator of Anti-Corruption Commission, Md Jahangir Alam, after he removed the names of 25 officials of Oriental Bank from a embezzlement case.

== Board of directors ==
Name	Position	Reference
Mr. Aklif Bin Amir	Chairman	
Mr. Tan Seng Chye	Director	
Lee Ooi Kim	Director	
Mr. Md. Mazibur Rahman	Managing Director & CEO	
