= Bank of Bahawalpur =

- Company type: Central bank (1947–1955); Commercial bank (1955–1974)
- Industry: Banking
- Founded: December 1947
- Defunct: 1974
- Fate: Merged into National Bank of Pakistan
- Successor: National Bank of Pakistan
- Headquarters: Bahawalpur, Pakistan
- Area served: Pakistan
- Owner: Bahawalpur State (1947–1955); Government of Pakistan (1955–1965); National Bank of Pakistan (1965–1974)

The Bank of Bahawalpur was the central bank of the State of Bahawalpur, and later a commercial bank in Pakistan, which operated from 1947 to 1974.

== History ==
The Bank of Bahawalpur was established by the Bahawalpur state in December 1947 after the creation of Pakistan. In 1950, it was listed on the Karachi Stock Exchange. In 1955, it became a state-owned bank of the Government of Pakistan after the dissolution of the Bahawalpur state in 1955.

In 1965, the National Bank of Pakistan acquired ownership of the Bank of Bahawalpur from the Government of Pakistan. In 1974, the Bank of Bahawalpur ceased its operations and was formally merged into the National Bank of Pakistan.
