= National Bank of Pakistan =

State-owned commercial bank in Pakistan

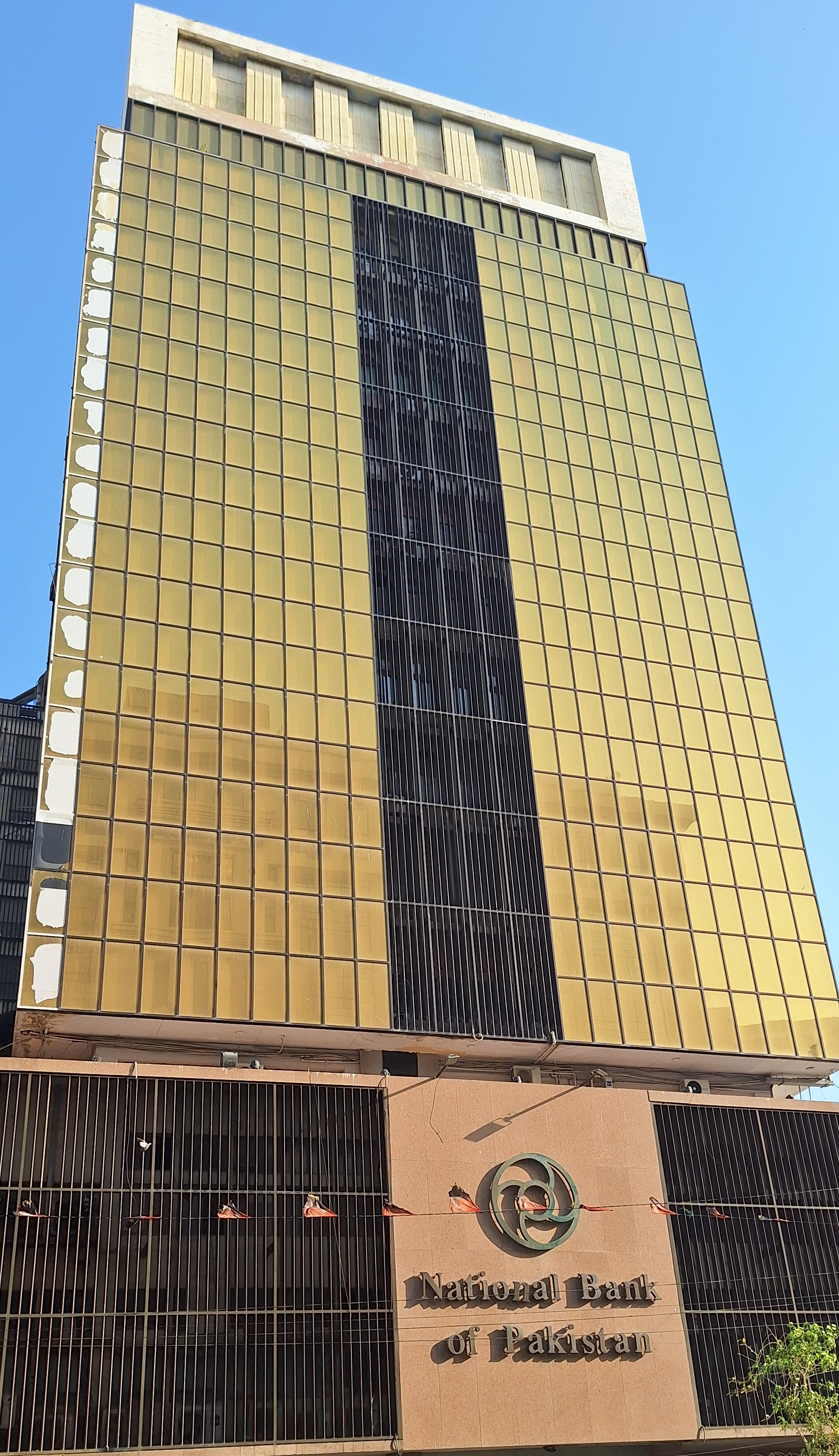
- Headquarters of National Bank of Pakistan on I.I. Chundrigar Road in Karachi
- Type: Public
- Traded as: PSX: NBP; KSE 100 component
- Industry: Banking
- Founded: November 1949; 77 years ago
- Headquarters: Karachi-74000, Pakistan
- Key people: Rehmat Ali Hasnie (CEO); Ashraf Mahmood Wathra (Chairman); Imran Sarwar (President)
- Products: Loans, Savings, Consumer Banking, Corporate Banking, Investment Banking
- Revenue: ▲ Rs. 318.25 billion (US$1.1 billion) (2025)
- Operating income: ▲ Rs. 188.97 billion (US$680 million) (2025)
- Net income: ▲ Rs. 85.87 billion (US$310 million) (2025)
- Total assets: ▲ Rs. 7.07 trillion (US$25 billion) (2025)
- Total equity: ▲ Rs. 5379.2 billion (US$19 billion) (2025)
- Number of employees: 15,160 (2025)
- Website: nbp.com.pk

National Bank of Pakistan (NBP) is a Pakistani state-owned multinational commercial bank which is a subsidiary of State Bank of Pakistan. It is headquartered in Karachi, Pakistan. As of December 2022, it has over 1,500 branches across Pakistan.

The bank provides various commercial and public sector banking services, including the debt-equity market, corporate investment banking, retail and consumer banking, agricultural financing, treasury services. In the year 2020, the bank was designated domestic systemically important bank (D-SIB) by the State Bank of Pakistan.

== History ==
The National Bank of Pakistan (NBP) was established in 1949 under the National Bank of Pakistan Ordinance as a government-owned bank and was inaugurated by Justice (R) Dr. Imtiaz Dhakan. Initially, NBP functioned as an agent of the central bank in areas where the State Bank of Pakistan did not have branches and managed government treasury operations. The bank's first branches were situated in the jute-growing regions of East Pakistan, followed by offices in Karachi and Lahore.

In 1950, NBP expanded internationally by opening a branch in Jeddah, Saudi Arabia. By 1955, the bank had established additional branches in London and Calcutta. Further international expansion included the establishment of a branch in Baghdad, Iraq, in 1957 and in Dar es Salaam, Tanganyika, in 1962. In 1964, a branch was opened in the United States.

Geopolitical events impacted NBP's overseas operations during this period. In 1964, the Iraqi government nationalised NBP's Baghdad branch. The outbreak of hostilities between India and Pakistan in 1965 led the Indian government to seize the Calcutta branch. In 1967, the Tanzanian government nationalised the Dar es Salaam branch.

In 1971, NBP acquired two branches of the Bank of China in Karachi and Chittagong. The separation of East Pakistan resulted in the loss of NBP's branches in that region. Subsequently, NBP merged with Eastern Mercantile Bank and Eastern Bank Corporation. In 1974, the government of Pakistan nationalised NBP, and as part of the consolidation of the banking sector, NBP acquired the Bank of Bahawalpur.

The bank continued its international operations by opening an offshore branch in Cairo in 1977. In 1994, NBP amalgamated Mehran Bank, and in 1997, it commenced operations of a branch in Ashgabat, Turkmenistan. In 2000, NBP opened a representative office in Almaty, Kazakhstan.

In 2001, the State Bank of Pakistan and the Bank of England permitted only two Pakistani banks to operate in the United Kingdom. As a result, NBP and United Bank Limited merged their UK operations to form Pakistan International Bank, with NBP holding a 45% stake and United Bank owning 55%. In 2002, Pakistan International Bank was renamed United National Bank Limited (UNB), maintaining the same ownership structure. Following its privatisation in Pakistan, UNB was owned 49% by the government of Pakistan and 51% by a joint foreign consortium from Abu Dhabi.

During this period, NBP underwent partial privatisation and the government of Pakistan sold 23.2 percent share through initial public offering on the Karachi Stock Exchange.

In 2003, NBP opened a branch in Kabul, Afghanistan, where the first ATM in the country was installed. The offshore branch in Cairo was closed in 2005. In 2010, NBP opened a branch in Karaganda, Kazakhstan, and in 2011, it established a representative office in Toronto, Canada.

In 2016, NBP opened the world's highest ATM machine, situated in Khunjerab Pass at an altitude of 4,693 m (15,397 ft 0 in).

== Presidents ==
Name	From	To
Syed Ali Raza	Jul-00	Jan-11
Qamar Hussain (acting)	Jan-11	Apr-11
Qamar Hussain	Apr-11	Jan-13
Asif A. Brohi	Jan-13	Sep-13
Asif Hassan (acting)	Sep-13	Jan-14
Syed Ahmad Iqbal Ashraf	Jan-14	Jan-17
Masood Kareem Sheikh (acting)	Jan-17	Mar-17
Saeed Ahmad	Mar-17	Aug-18
Tariq Jamali (acting)	Aug-18	Feb-19
Arif Usmani	Feb-19	May-22
Rehmat Ali Hasnie (acting)	May-22	Aug-23
Rehmat Ali Hasnie	Aug-23	Aug-26
Abdul Wahid Sethi (Acting)	Aug-26	Sep-26
Imran Sarwar	Sep-26	Present

=== Subsidiaries ===
- Taurus Securities
- NBP Exchange
- NBP Leasing
- NBP Modaraba
- CJSC Bank in Almaty, Kazakhstan
- United National Bank in the UK
- NBP Funds is a Non-Banking Finance Company jointly owned by National Bank of Pakistan and Fullerton Fund Management Group, Singapore, which in-turn is a wholly owned subsidiary of Temasek Holdings, Singapore.

== Sports ==
- Cricket

NBP owns a team since 1947 and a venue since 1998, both named after it and both located in Karachi. In October 2022, NBP got the naming rights of National Stadium Karachi.

- Football

NBP owns a Karachi-based men's team playing in Pakistan Premier League. NBP is not involved with any women's team in Pakistan, nevertheless, in October 2020, its director, Imam Baloch, publicly lauded Diya W.F.C.'s actions for spreading football to poor and "backward areas" of Karachi and Sindh.

- Hockey

NBP owns a team which won the National Hockey Championship in 2013.

== See also ==
- State Bank of Pakistan
- Zarai Taraqiati Bank Ltd.
