= Jalal Alamgir =

Bangladeshi academic (1971–2011)

- Born: 17 January 1971; Bangladesh
- Died: 3 December 2011 (aged 40); Phuket, Thailand
- Education: Brown University (Ph.D.); St. Lawrence University
- Occupation: Professor
- Employer: University of Massachusetts Boston

Jalal Alamgir (17 January 1971 – 3 December 2011) was a Bangladeshi-American academic and an associate professor of political science at the University of Massachusetts-Boston and the son of Awami League Member of Parliament Muhiuddin Khan Alamgir. He specialised in the inter-relationships between globalisation and representational politics. He died in a drowning accident in Thailand on 3 December 2011.

== Career ==
Alamgir earned a Ph.D. from Brown University. He was a tenured faculty at University of Massachusetts-Boston, holding the position of associate professor of political science. He was also a fellow at the South Asia Initiative at Harvard University. Prior to joining UMass, Alamgir held research appointments at the Watson Institute for International and Public Affairs, the Southern Asian Institute at Columbia University, and the Centre for Policy Research, New Delhi. Aside from his research, he consulted for the United Nations Population Fund and strategy consulting organizations.

At the time of his death, Alamgir was working on several research projects: political violence and justice in Bangladesh and Pakistan, foreign policy of Bangladesh, the representation of values in Indian foreign policy, and the relationship between authoritarianism and globalization in Myanmar.

In addition to his academic career, Alamgir was a principal at Red Bridge Strategy, Inc., which he described as a consultancy he co-founded "to help organizations globalize their operations with locally and politically-informed strategies." Describing the relationship between his academic and consulting work, he said, "The university involves me with cutting-edge research and blue-sky thinking, and I get to meet many scholars and students– wonderful, eccentric, motivated– all helping us to understand the world better. At Red Bridge Strategy, I get to try out some of the ideas I develop in academia, applying them to real world problems and puzzles that need to be 'solved' within a limited time, limited resources, and with a pragmatic approach."

== Publications ==
=== Books ===
Alamgir's first book, India's Open-Economy Policy: Globalism, Rivalry, Continuity was selected by Asia Policy as a recommended book for its 2008 "Policymaker's Library" and was nominated for the Association for Asian Studies' Ananda Kentish Coomaraswamy Book Prize.

=== Articles and essays ===
Alamgir's scholarly essays include "The 1971 Genocide: War Crimes and Political Crimes" and "Bangladesh's Fresh Start." Other papers appeared in International Studies Review, Asian Survey, Asian Studies Review, Issues and Studies, Pacific Affairs, Brown Economic Review, The Journal of Contemporary Asia, The Journal of Bangladesh Studies, The Journal of Social Studies, Encyclopedia of Globalization, States in the Global Economy (ed. Linda Weiss, Cambridge University Press), and Globalization and Politics in India (ed. Baldev Raj Nayar, Oxford University Press).

He also wrote for different newspapers and magazines, including Foreign Policy, Current History, The Nation, China Daily, openDemocracy, GlobalPost, The Daily Star Forum, Catamaran: Journal of South Asian American Writing, and the Huffington Post. Dr. Alamgir's commentary and opinion were featured in The New York Times, The Washington Post, and The Boston Globe, and aired on WBAI Radio (New York), NEEN (Boston), Deutsche Welle Radio (Germany), and Voice of America (Washington, DC).

== Activism ==
Alamgir was a member of Drishtipat, a global network of Bangladeshi activists, and participated in the Drishtipat Writers' Collective. In 2007, he led a campaign protesting the detention of his father, Member of Parliament Muhiuddin Khan Alamgir by Bangladesh's military-led caretaker government. He cycled 85 miles for the Pan-Mass Challenge to raise funds for cancer research, inspired by the experience of his mother's treatment for cancer at the Dana–Farber Cancer Institute, Boston.

== Death ==
Alamgir was in Thailand with his wife Fazeela Morshed for a holiday in December 2011. He accidentally drowned while swimming at Pattaya Beach. Bangladeshi Prime Minister Sheikh Hasina issued a condolence message in which she "prayed for the salvation of the departed soul and conveyed her sympathy to the bereaved family." Academics Borhanuddin Khan Jahangir, Muntassir Mamoon, Khandakar Rashidul Huq Noba among others were present at the airport when Jalal's body arrived in Bangladesh on 5 December 2011.
