= Taltoli, Bangladesh =

Village in Chittagong Division, Bangladesh

Coordinates: 23.3287°N 90.9483°E

Taltali is a Bangladeshi village in the upazila of Kachua, Chandpur District in Chittagong Division.

== See also ==
- List of villages in Bangladesh
