= Padma Bank =

Private commercial bank in Bangladesh

Padma Bank PLC.
- Formerly: The Farmers Bank Limited
- Type: Public
- Industry: Banking; Financial services
- Founded: 2013; 13 years ago
- Headquarters: Gulshan, Dhaka, Bangladesh
- Number of employees: 1600+
- Website: www.padmabankbd.com

Padma Bank PLC. is a private commercial bank headquartered in Gulshan, Dhaka, Bangladesh. The bank was established in 2013. The fourth-generation bank commenced its banking operation on June 3, 2013. By an order on January 29, 2019, Bangladesh Bank changed the name of The Farmers Bank Limited to Padma Bank Limited after the bank failed to pay its liabilities due to numerous bad loans and embezzlements.

== History ==
The Farmers Bank Limited was established in 2013 and was granted a licence due to the political links of its founder Muhiuddin Khan Alamgir.

In January 2016, Bangladesh Bank appointed an observer to The Farmers Bank Limited who had found evidence of irregularities with the distribution of 4 billion taka loans.

Farmers Bank used its security deposit money with Bangladesh Bank to payback interbank short-term loans to four banks for a total of 7 billion taka in December 2017. This resulted in Farmers Bank falling short of the Mandatory Statutory Liquidity Requirement. The four banks were Agrani Bank Limited, Janata Bank Limited, Sonali Bank Limited, and NRB Bank Limited. Farmers Bank distributed loans to companies that never filed a loan application. The Bank distributed loans before their approval. By 2017, the bank was virtually broke according to The Daily Star.

Bangladesh Telecommunication Company Limited recovered 350 million taka from The Farmers Bank Limited on 1 November 2017 after the bank refused twice to allow them access to the funds. The Bank sought support from Bangladesh Bank due to a liquidity crisis. Bangladesh Bank refused to help until there was a change in the board of directors. On 22 November 2017, Bangladesh Bank provided 960 million taka repo loan to Farmers Bank due to its liquidity crises. Bangladesh Bank also provided it with a three months deadline to sort out the liquidity crises and asked its directors to inject cash into the Bank.

Md Ehsan Khasru was appointed managing director of The Farmers Bank Limited on 5 January 2018.

Minister of Finance, Abul Maal Abdul Muhith, announced on 8 March 2018 that Investment Corporation of Bangladesh and state owned Banks will take over 60 percent of The Farmers Bank Limited. On 24 March 2018, Bangladesh Bank disclosed that their investigation of The Farmers Bank Limited had found 5 billion taka loans were given to 11 companies violating banking rules in Bangladesh. The Central Bank blamed Muhiuddin Khan Alamgir and Mahabubul Haque Chisty, ex-chairman of The Farmers Bank Limited executive committee, over the loan embezzlements. The 11 companies are Apollo Trade International, Advanced Development Technologies, Abeda Memorial Hospital, Al-Faruque Bags, NAR Sweaters Ltd, Bangladesh Development Company, Mac Trading, Index Housing, Mollik Aquaculture Farm, Messers Premjoy, and Nahar Farmers Group. M/S Roseburg Auto Rice Mills Ltd, owned by Sherpur District Bangladesh Nationalist Party leader Md Hazrat Ali, embezzled almost 700 million taka from the Bank.

In October 2018, Anti-Corruption Commission announced that its investigation had found involvement of two businessmen in embezzling 40 million taka from The Farmers Bank Limited. On 10 December 2019, they filed charges against 11 including former Chief Justice of Bangladesh, Surendra Kumar Sinha.

In April 2018, Anti-Corruption Commission detained Mahabubul Haque Chisty and three others, including his son Rashedul Haque Chisty, over the money laundering of 1.6 billion taka embezzled from the Bank. The other two accused are Muhammad Masudur Rahman Khan, First Vice President of The Farmers Bank Limited, and Zia Uddin Ahmed, Senior Vice President of The Farmers Bank Limited. They were questioned by the Anti-Corruption Commission in detention. Rashedul Haque Chisty received bail from Judge KM Emrul Kayesh on two cases concerning The Farmers Bank Limited on 18 May 2020. He also received Metropolitan Magistrate Md Sarafuzzaman Ansary and Judge Al Asad Md Ashifuzzaman on cases related to The Farmers Bank Limited on 19 May 2020. Bangladesh High Court issued a stay order on his bail verdict on 28 May 2020. Mahabubul Haque Chisty was shown arrested in five cases related to the embezzlement of money from The Farmers Bank Limited. On 26 July 2018, Chisty's bail application was rejected by Bangladesh High Court. Anti-Corruption Commission filed charges against 18 individuals including the CEO of the Bank, Chowdhury Mustaque Ahmed, for embezzling 300 million taka from the Bank. Anti-Corruption Commission sued the chairperson of S. A. Group and six others with Gulshan Police Station over the embezzlement of loans from Farmers Bank.

The Farmers Bank Limited was renamed to Padma Bank Limited in December 2019. Former Chairperson of the Bank Muhiuddin Khan Alamgir, who is also an Awami League politician, member of Parliament, and former Minister of Home Affairs, was removed from his post at the bank. The managing director, AKM Shamim, of the Bank was also forcefully removed from his post at the Bank by Bangladesh Bank. The Bank had failed to pay back money to depositors and had to receive a bailout from the Government of Bangladesh worth 8.15 billion taka.

Padma Bank failed to return 170 million taka fixed deposits to Bangladesh Inland Water Transport Authority Employees’ Pension Fund. The Bank also owes money to 18 government organizations such as the Bangladesh Telecommunication Regulatory Commission, Bangladesh Power Development Board, Bangladesh Climate Trust Fund, Bangladesh Petroleum Corporation, Chittagong Port Authority, Jiban Bima Corporation, Mongla Port Authority, Petrobangla, and Sonali Bank. Bangladesh Textile Mills Corporation successfully recovered its deposits with the bank.

For Justice Surendra Kumar Sinha and 10 others were indicted on 13 August 2020 over the embezzlement case by Special Judge of Court-4 of Dhaka, Judge Shaikh Nazmul Alam.

Muhiuddin Khan Alamgir denied allegations of embezzlement from his bank following reports by media organisations. He also denied reports that he charged commissions on loans from The Farmers Bank Limited.

Padma Bank requested Bangladesh Bank waive a 1.44 billion taka fine it imposed on the bank for failure to maintain the required cash reserve ratio and statutory liquidity ratio in December 2020. Bangladesh Bank waived 890 million taka from the fine.

Bangladesh Securities and Exchange Commission initiated an investigation of Padma Bank Limited following allegations that the bank Chairman Chowdhury Nafeez Sarafat had misused 1 billion taka from the bank by former bank chairperson Mohiuddin Khan Alamgir.

In March 2024, The EXIM Bank and Padma Bank signed a MoU at the Bangladesh Bank (BB) headquarters, under which the EXIM Bank will 'take over' the Padma Bank. It is learnt that after the merger it will operate under the name EXIM Bank. However on 24 December 2024, EXIM Bank and Padma Bank called off planned merger.

In October 2026, the bank was in financial distress and was receiving liquidity support from the government. Since 2019, the bank had been operated by managing directors of state owned banks.

== Board of directors ==
Name	Designation	Reference
Md. Shawkat Ali Khan	Chairperson	
Md.Mazibur Rahman	Director	
Md.Anwarul Islam	Director	
Md.Abdul Hossain	Director	
Tamir Marzam Huda	Director	
Shahnul Hasan Khan	Director	
Dr.Farhana Modem	Director	
AHM Ariful Islam FCA	Independent Director	
Md. Rukunuzzaman	Independent Director	
Kazi Md.Talha	CEO(CC)	
