= Kachua Upazila, Chandpur =

Kachua কচুয়া
- Upazila
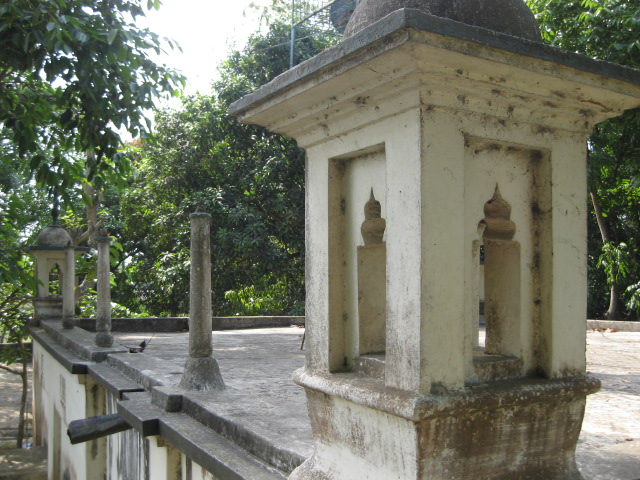
- Taltoli Jama Mosque

- Coordinates: 23°21′N 90°53′E
- Country: Bangladesh
- Division: Chattogram
- District: Chandpur
- Thana: 25 January 1918
- Upazila: 1983

Government
  - MP (Chandpur-1): A. N. M. Ehsanul Hoque Milan

Area
  - Total: 235.81 km^{2} (91.05 sq mi)

Population (2022)
  - Total: 405,497
  - Density: 1,719.6/km^{2} (4,453.7/sq mi)
- Time zone: UTC+6 (BST)
- Postal code: 3630
- Area code: 08425
- Website: kachua.chandpur.gov.bd

Kachua (Bengali: কচুয়া) is an upazila of Chandpur District in Bangladesh, located in the Chattogram Division. It is a part of the Greater Cumilla region.

== History ==
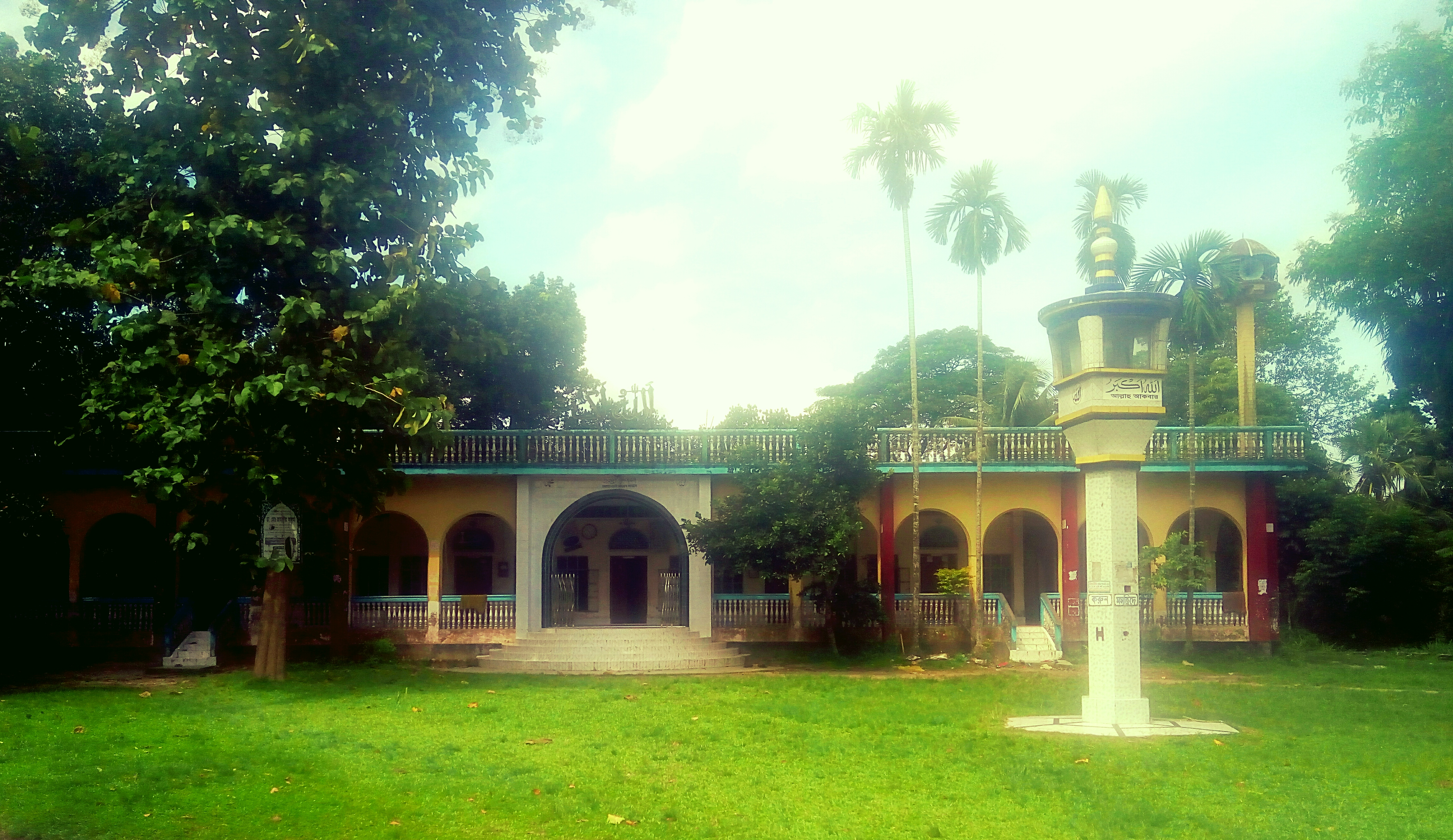
The Bakhtiyar Khan Mosque in Ujani was later the centre of the activities of Rashid Ahmad Gangohi's student Qari Ibrahim Ujani, who founded the Ujani Madrasa in 1901.

During the reign of the Mughal emperor Bahadur Shah in 1705/1706 CE, the Faujdar (local governor) Bakhtiyar ibn Ilyas Khan built a mosque in Ujania which still stands today. The area was also settled by a wali known as Shah Niamat Shah, who was based on the banks of the Tarini Dighi. People from various places would travel to meet the Wali, and a haat bazaar later emerged known as Niamat Shaher Bazar (Niamat Shah's bazaar). It is presently known as Kachua Bazar after the establishment of Kachua Thana.

During the administration of the British East India Company, Kachua was a part of the Daudkandi Thana. A large portion of present-day Kachua was under the zamindari of the Munshibari family of Cumilla. Abdul Hamid Munshi of this family established the glorious Taltoli Jama Mosque in the village of Taltoli in 1891.

By the time of Queen Victoria, Kachua was under the Hajiganj Thana. A separate thana was established with the name of Kachua on 25 January 1918 during the reign of George V. There are numerous theories behind the naming of Kachua. One theory suggests that it is of Hindustani origin. It was said that in 1905, the Hajiganj Thana was divided into two parts and survey work was carried out to determine its boundary/area. The survey was conducted under the leadership of a police officer. The survey work started from the southern boundary of Daudkandi Thana i.e. the northern end of present Kachua Upazila. At one stage of the survey, the police officer and other people came to the southern part of the village on the north side adjacent to Kachua Bazar and found some palm trees. They camped for a few days in a high place in this palm tree area which is now known as Dhulikachua village. A local villager by the name of Maulvi Ali Akmat asked how much of the survey work had been done and in reply, the officer said "Kuch Hua" meaning some things have happened. The name Kachua was said to have been derived from "Kuch Hua" according to this incident.

During the Bangladesh Liberation War of 1971, a brawl took place in Raghunathpur Bazar leading to the death of one Bengali freedom fighter and 14 civilians. Kachua Thana was upgraded to an upazila in 1983.

== Geography ==
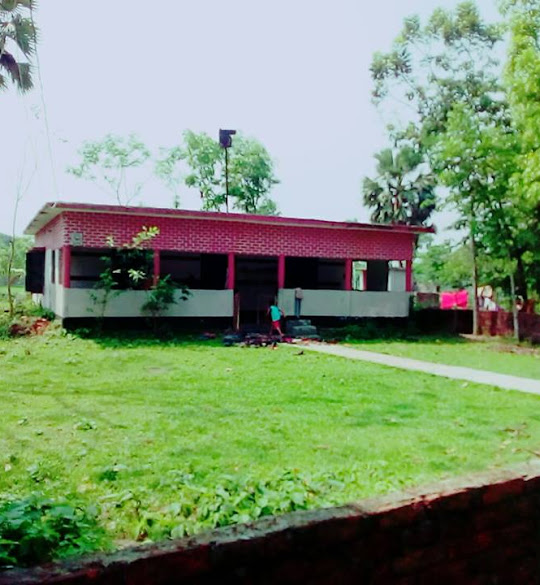
A historic mosque in Patwari Bari, Gobindapur.

Kachua is located in between 23.15 and 23.28 degrees of North latitudes and 90.48 to 91.01 degrees of East longitudes. (23.3500°N 90.8917°E ). It has a total area of 235.81 km^{2}.

== Demographics ==
Historical population
Year	Pop. (000)	±%
1981	248	—
1991	293	+18.1%
2001	331	+13.0%
2011	382	+15.4%
Source: Bangladesh Bureau of Statistics

Religions in Kachua Upazila (2022)
Religion	Percent
Islam	93.73%
Hinduism	6.26%
Other or not stated	0.01%

According to the 2022 Bangladeshi census, Kachua Upazila had 95,822 households and a population of 405,497. 10.76% of the population were under 5 years of age. Kachua had a literacy rate (age 7 and over) of 75.02%: 74.99% for males and 75.04% for females, and a sex ratio of 86.20 males for every 100 females. 50,544 (12.46%) lived in urban areas.

According to the 2011 Census of Bangladesh, Kachua Upazila had 76,642 households and a population of 382,139. 98,415 (25.75%) were under 10 years of age. Kachua had a literacy rate (age 7 and over) of 53.77%, compared to the national average of 51.8%, and a sex ratio of 1114 females per 1000 males. 27,024 (7.07%) lived in urban areas.

== Administration ==
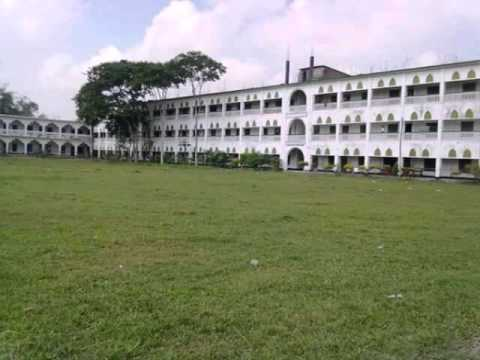
The Jamia Islamia Ibrahimia madrasa, founded in 1901.

Kachua Upazila is divided into Kachua Municipality and 12 union councils: Ashrafpur, Bitara, Dakshin Gohat, Dakshin Kachua, Kadla, Karyia, Pashim Sahadebpur, Pathoir, Purba Sahadebpur, Sachar, Uttar Gohat, and Uttar Kachua. The union councils are subdivided into 158 mauzas and 232 villages.

Kachua Municipality is subdivided into 9 wards and 20 mahallas.

== Notable people ==
Some famous residents of Kachua include:

- Jalal Alamgir (1971-2011), former associate professor of political science University of Massachusetts Boston
- Mohiuddin Khan Alamgir (b. 1942), economist and civil servant
- Burhanuddin Khan Jahangir (1936-2020), writer and educationist
- Muntassir Uddin Khan Mamoon (b. 1951), historian
- A.N.M. Ehsanul Hoque Milan (b. 1957), Bangladesh Nationalist Party politician
- Mesbah Uddin Khan (d. 2006), Awami League politician
- Ibrahim Ujani (1863-1943), qazi and Islamic scholar
- Muhammed Alamgir(b. 1963), educationist

== See also ==
- Upazilas of Bangladesh
- Districts of Bangladesh
- Divisions of Bangladesh
