= Mesbah Uddin Khan =

Bangladeshi politician

Member of Bangladesh Parliament

Personal details
- Political party: Bangladesh Awami League

Mesbah Uddin Khan is a Bangladesh Awami League politician and a former member of parliament for Chandpur-1.

== Career ==
He was elected to parliament from Chandpur-1 as a Bangladesh Awami League candidate in 1991.
