= Ministry of Power, Energy and Mineral Resources =

Government ministry of Bangladesh

- বিদ্যুৎ, জ্বালানি ও খনিজ সম্পদ মন্ত্রণালয়
- Government Seal of Bangladesh

Ministry overview
- Jurisdiction: Government of Bangladesh
- Headquarters: Building # 6, Bangladesh Secretariat, Dhaka
- Annual budget: ৳17345 crore (US$1.4 billion) (2026-2027)
- Minister responsible: Iqbal Hassan Mahmood
- Minister of State responsible: Anindya Islam Amit
- Ministry executives: Habibur Rahman, Senior Secretary, Power Division; Khairuzzaman Mozumder, Senior Secretary, Energy and Mineral Resources Division
- Child agencies: Power Division; Energy and Mineral Resources Division
- Website: mpemr.gov.bd

The Ministry of Power, Energy and Mineral Resources (Bengali: বিদ্যুৎ, জ্বালানি ও খনিজ সম্পদ মন্ত্রণালয়; Bidyuṯ, jbālāni ō khanija sampada mantraṇālaẏa) (abbreviated as MPEMR) or Ministry of Energy is a ministry of the Government of Bangladesh. It is mainly responsible for all policies and matters relating to electricity generation, transmission, and distribution from conventional and non-conventional energy sources including hydro electricity. It also deals with the import, distribution, exploration, extraction, pricing, and other policy related details of the primary fuels.

The MPEMR has two Divisions headed by two secretaries:

- Power Division
- Energy and Mineral Resources Division

== Senior officials ==
=== Ministerial team ===
The ministerial team at the MPEMR is headed by the Prime Minister of Bangladesh, who assigns the team to manage the minister's office and the ministry.

- Minister in charge — Iqbal Hassan Mahmood
- Minister of state — Anindya Islam Amit

== Departments ==
=== Power Division ===
- Office of the Chief Electric Inspector (OCEI)
- Bangladesh Power Development Board
- Dhaka Electric Supply Company Limited
- Dhaka Power Distribution Company Limited
- Ashuganj Power Station Company Limited.
- Electricity Generation Company Limited.
- West Zone Power Distribution Company Limited.
- Bangladesh Rural Electrification Board
- Rural Power Company Limited
- Power Cell
- Power Grid Company of Bangladesh
- North West Power Generation Company Limited
- Sustainable and Renewable Energy Development Authority (SREDA)
- Northern Electricity Supply Company Limited
- Bangladesh Energy and Power Research Council (EPRC)

=== Energy and Mineral Resources Division ===
- Bangladesh Oil, Gas and Mineral Corporation
- Bangladesh Petroleum Exploration and Production Company Limited
- Bangladesh Gas Fields Company Limited
- Sylhet Gas Fields Limited
- Gas Transmission Company Limited (GTCL)
- Titas Gas Transmission and Distribution Company
- Bakhrabad Gas Distribution Company Limited
- Jalalabad Gas Transmission and Distribution System Limited
- Pashchimanchal Gas Company Limited
- Karnaphuli Gas Distribution Company Limited
- Sundarban Gas Company Limited
- Rupantarita Prakritik Gas Company Limited
- Barapukuria Coal Mining Company Limited
- Maddhapara Granite Mining Company Limited
- Geological Survey of Bangladesh
- Mineral Resources Development Bureau
- Bangladesh Energy Regulatory Commission
- Bangladesh Petroleum Institute
- Bangladesh Hydrocarbon Unit
- Department of Explosives
- Bangladesh Petroleum Corporation
- Eastern Refinery Limited

== See also ==
- Energy law
