= Third Zia ministry =

17th Council of Ministers of Bangladesh

- 17th Council of Ministers of the People’s Republic of Bangladesh
- 10 October 2001 – 29 October 2006
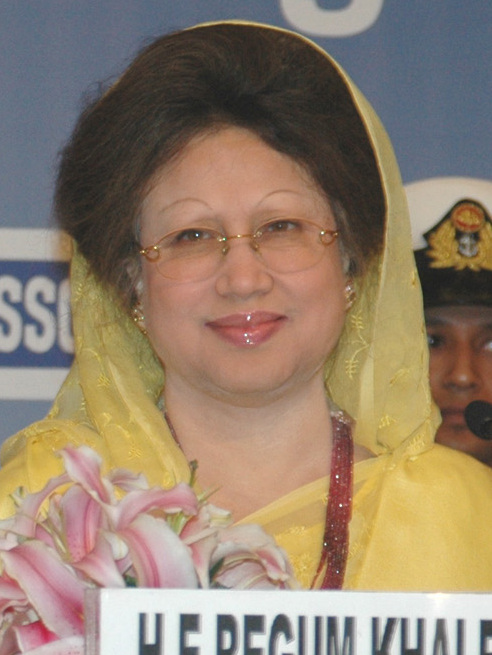
- Khaleda Zia; Hon'ble Prime Minister of Bangladesh
- Date formed: 10 October 2001
- Date dissolved: 29 October 2006

People and organisations
- President: Muhammad Jamiruddin Sircar
- Prime Minister: Khaleda Zia
- Total no. of members: 61 (Including the Prime Minister)
- Member party: Bangladesh Nationalist Party; Bangladesh Jamaat-e-Islami
- Status in legislature: Coalition
- Opposition party: Bangladesh Awami League
- Opposition leader: Sheikh Hasina

History
- Incoming formation: 8th Jatiya Sangsad
- Outgoing formation: 9th Jatiya Sangsad
- Election: 2001
- Outgoing election: 2008
- Legislature terms: 5 years, 19 days
- Predecessor: Latifur
- Successor: Iajuddin

The Third Khaleda ministry was a ministry that had power over the Government of Bangladesh during the 8th legislative session of the Jatiya Sangsad following the 2001 general election. The cabinet took office on 10 October 2001 and left office on 29 October 2006. The Prime Minister and head of the government was Khaleda Zia.

== Ministers ==
=== Cabinet Ministers ===
Portfolio	Name	Took office	Left office	Party	Remarks
Prime Minister and also in-charge of: Cabinet Division; Ministry of Establishment; Ministry of Defence; Armed Forces Division; Ministry of Chittagong Hill Tracts Affairs; Ministry of Primary and Mass Education; Ministry of Power, Energy and Mineral Resources; All important policy issues; and All other portfolios not allocated to any Minister.	Khaleda Zia	10 October 2001	29 October 2006	BNP	
Ministry of Foreign Affairs	Badruddoza Chowdhury	11 October 2001	14 November 2001	BNP	Resigned.
Ministry of Foreign Affairs	Morshed Khan	15 November 2001	29 October 2006	BNP	
Ministry of Finance; Ministry of Planning	Saifur Rahman	11 October 2001	29 October 2006	BNP	
Ministry of Local Government, Rural Development and Co-operatives	Abdul Mannan Bhuiyan	11 October 2001	29 October 2006	BNP	
Ministry of Textiles	Abdul Matin Chowdhury	11 October 2001	6 May 2004	BNP	Merged as Ministry of Textiles and Jute.
Ministry of Textiles and Jute	Shajahan Siraj	6 May 2004	29 October 2006	BNP	
Ministry of Health and Family Welfare	Khandaker Mosharraf Hossain	11 October 2001	29 October 2006	BNP	
Ministry of Law, Justice and Parliamentary Affairs	Moudud Ahmed	11 October 2001	29 October 2006	BNP	
Ministry of Agriculture	Motiur Rahman Nizami	11 October 2001	22 May 2003	Jamaat	
Ministry of Agriculture	M. K. Anwar	22 May 2003	29 October 2006	BNP	
Ministry of Communications	Nazmul Huda	11 October 2001	29 October 2006	BNP	
Ministry of Land	Shamsul Islam	11 October 2001	6 May 2004	BNP	
Ministry of Land	Abdus Sattar Bhuiyan	6 May 2004	29 October 2006	BNP	State Minister (M/C) was responsible.
Ministry of Disaster Management and Relief	Chowdhury Kamal Ibne Yusuf	11 October 2001	6 May 2004	BNP	Merged as Ministry of Food and Disaster Management.
Ministry of Food and Disaster Management	Chowdhury Kamal Ibne Yusuf	6 May 2004	29 October 2006	BNP	
Ministry of Industries	M. K. Anwar	11 October 2001	22 May 2003	BNP	
Ministry of Industries	Motiur Rahman Nizami	22 May 2003	29 October 2006	Jamaat	
Ministry of Food	Tariqul Islam	11 October 2001	11 March 2002	BNP	
Ministry of Food	Abdullah Al Noman	11 March 2002	6 May 2004	BNP	Merged as Ministry of Food and Disaster Management.
Ministry of Environment and Forest	Shajahan Siraj	11 October 2001	6 May 2004	BNP	
Ministry of Environment and Forest	Tariqul Islam	6 May 2004	29 October 2006	BNP	
Ministry of Shipping	Akbar Hossain	11 October 2001	25 June 2006	BNP	Died in Office.
Ministry of Shipping	Khaleda Zia	25 June 2006	9 July 2006	BNP	Prime Minister was responsible.
Ministry of Shipping	Mohammad Quamrul Islam	9 July 2006	29 October 2006	BNP	State Minister (M/C) was responsible.
Ministry of Women and Children Affairs	Khurshid Jahan Haq	11 October 2001	14 June 2006	BNP	Died in Office.
Ministry of Women and Children Affairs	Alamgir Kabir	14 June 2006	29 October 2006	BNP	State Minister (M/C) was responsible.
Ministry of Labour and Employment	Abdullah Al Noman	11 October 2001	11 March 2002	BNP	
Ministry of Water Resources	L. K. Siddiqi	11 October 2001	22 May 2003	BNP	Resigned.
Ministry of Water Resources	Hafizuddin Ahmed	22 May 2003	29 October 2006	BNP	
Ministry of Information	Abdul Moyeen Khan	11 October 2001	11 March 2002	BNP	
Ministry of Information	Tariqul Islam	11 March 2002	6 May 2004	BNP	
Ministry of Information	Shamsul Islam	6 May 2004	29 October 2006	BNP	
Ministry of Housing and Public Works	Mirza Abbas	11 October 2001	29 October 2006	BNP	
Ministry of Fisheries and Livestock	Sadeque Hossain Khoka	11 October 2001	22 May 2003	BNP	
Ministry of Fisheries and Livestock	Abdus Sattar Bhuiyan	22 May 2003	6 May 2004	BNP	State Minister (M/C) was responsible.
Ministry of Fisheries and Livestock	Abdullah Al Noman	6 May 2004	29 October 2006	BNP	
Ministry of Commerce	Amir Khasru Mahmud Chowdhury	11 October 2001	25 March 2004	BNP	Resigned.
Ministry of Commerce	Altaf Hossain Chowdhury	25 March 2004	24 April 2006	BNP	
Ministry of Commerce	Hafizuddin Ahmed	24 April 2006	29 October 2006	BNP	
Ministry of Posts and Telecommunications	Aminul Haque	11 October 2001	29 October 2006	BNP	
Ministry of Home Affairs	Altaf Hossain Chowdhury	11 October 2001	25 March 2004	BNP	
Ministry of Home Affairs	Lutfozzaman Babar	25 March 2004	29 October 2006	BNP	State Minister (M/C) was responsible.
Ministry of Jute	Hafizuddin Ahmed	11 October 2001	22 May 2003	BNP	
Ministry of Jute	Lutfor Rahman Khan Azad	22 May 2003	6 May 2004	BNP	State Minister (M/C) was responsible. Merged as Ministry of Textiles and Jute.
Ministry of Education	Osman Faruk	11 October 2001	29 October 2006	BNP	
Ministry of Social Welfare	Ali Ahsan Mohammad Mojaheed	11 October 2001	29 October 2006	Jamaat	
Ministry of Science and Technology	Lutfor Rahman Khan Azad	11 October 2001	11 March 2002	BNP	State Minister (M/C) was responsible.
Ministry of Science and Technology	Abdul Moyeen Khan	11 March 2002	29 October 2006	BNP	
Ministry of Without Portfolio	Harunur Rashid Khan Monno	11 October 2001	22 May 2003	BNP	Resigned.
Ministry of Without Portfolio	Abdul Matin Chowdhury	6 May 2004	29 October 2006	BNP	
Ministry of Without Portfolio	Altaf Hossain Chowdhury	24 April 2006	29 October 2006	BNP	

=== State Ministers (Ministry Charge) ===
Portfolio	Name	Took office	Left office	Party	Remarks
Ministry of Youth and Sports	Fazlur Rahman Potol	11 October 2001	29 October 2006	BNP	
Ministry of Religious Affairs	Mosharraf Hossain Shahjahan	11 October 2001	29 October 2006	BNP	
Ministry of Civil Aviation and Tourism	Mir Mohammad Nasiruddin	11 October 2001	18 November 2005	BNP	Resigned.
Ministry of Civil Aviation and Tourism	Mirza Fakhrul Islam Alamgir	18 November 2005	29 October 2006	BNP	
Ministry of Cultural Affairs	Selima Rahman	11 October 2001	29 October 2006	BNP	
Ministry of Power, Energy and Mineral Resources	A. K. M. Mosharraf Hossain (Energy and Mineral Resources)	11 October 2001	18 June 2005	BNP	Resigned.
Ministry of Power, Energy and Mineral Resources	Iqbal Hassan Mahmood (Power)	11 October 2001	21 May 2006	BNP	
Ministry of Power, Energy and Mineral Resources	Anwarul Kabir Talukdar (Power)	21 May 2006	29 September 2006	BNP	Resigned.
Ministry of Power, Energy and Mineral Resources	Abdus Sattar Bhuiyan (Power)	3 October 2006	29 October 2006	BNP	
Ministry of Liberation War Affairs	Redwan Ahmed	23 October 2001	22 May 2003	BNP	Resigned.
Ministry of Liberation War Affairs	Rezaul Karim	22 May 2003	29 October 2006	BNP	
Ministry of Expatriates' Welfare and Overseas Employment	Mohammad Quamrul Islam	20 December 2001	9 July 2006	BNP	
Ministry of Expatriates' Welfare and Overseas Employment	Lutfor Rahman Khan Azad	9 July 2006	29 October 2006	BNP	
Ministry of Labour and Employment	Lutfor Rahman Khan Azad	11 March 2002	22 May 2003	BNP	
Ministry of Labour and Employment	Amanullah Aman	22 May 2003	29 October 2006	BNP	
Ministry of NGO Affairs	Lutfor Rahman Khan Azad	6 May 2004	9 July 2006	BNP	
Ministry of Without Portfolio	Mohammad Quamrul Islam	11 October 2001	20 December 2001	BNP	
Ministry of Without Portfolio	Redwan Ahmed	11 October 2001	23 October 2001	BNP	

=== State Ministers ===
Portfolio	Name	Took office	Left office	Party	Remarks
Ministry of Land	Shahjahan Omar	11 October 2001	7 April 2002	BNP	
Ministry of Land	Abdus Sattar Bhuiyan	7 April 2002	22 May 2003	BNP	
Ministry of Foreign Affairs	Reaz Rahman	11 October 2001	25 March 2004	BNP	Resigned.
Ministry of Housing and Public Works	Alamgir Kabir	11 October 2001	16 May 2006	BNP	
Ministry of Local Government, Rural Development and Co-operatives	Ziaul Haque Zia	11 October 2001	29 October 2006	BNP	
Ministry of Finance; Ministry of Planning	Anwarul Kabir Talukdar	11 October 2001	21 May 2006	BNP	
Ministry of Finance; Ministry of Planning	Shah M. Abul Hussain	11 October 2001	29 October 2006	BNP	
Ministry of Health and Family Welfare	Rezaul Karim	11 October 2001	9 December 2001	BNP	
Ministry of Health and Family Welfare	Amanullah Aman	11 October 2001	22 May 2003	BNP	
Ministry of Health and Family Welfare	Mizanur Rahman Sinha	22 May 2003	29 October 2006	BNP	
Ministry of Home Affairs	Lutfozzaman Babar	11 October 2001	25 March 2004	BNP	
Ministry of Communications	Salahuddin Ahmed	11 October 2001	29 October 2006	BNP	
Ministry of Agriculture	Mirza Fakhrul Islam Alamgir	11 October 2001	18 November 2005	BNP	
Ministry of Agriculture	Iqbal Hassan Mahmood	21 May 2006	29 October 2006	BNP	
Ministry of Commerce	Barkat Ullah Bulu	11 October 2001	22 May 2003	BNP	Resigned.
Ministry of Disaster Management and Relief	Ebadur Rahman Chowdhury	11 October 2001	22 May 2003	BNP	Resigned.
Ministry of Posts and Telecommunications	Ahsanul Haq Mollah	11 October 2001	22 May 2003	BNP	Resigned.
Ministry of Education	Ehsanul Hoque Milan	11 October 2001	29 October 2006	BNP	
Ministry of Textiles	Mizanur Rahman Sinha	11 October 2001	22 May 2003	BNP	
Ministry of Law, Justice and Parliamentary Affairs	Abdus Sattar Bhuiyan	11 October 2001	7 April 2002	BNP	
Ministry of Law, Justice and Parliamentary Affairs	Shahjahan Omar	7 April 2002	29 October 2006	BNP	
Ministry of Water Resources	Gautam Chakroborty	11 October 2001	29 October 2006	BNP	
Ministry of Environment and Forest	Jafrul Islam Chowdhury	11 October 2001	29 October 2006	BNP	
Ministry of Industries	Rezaul Karim	9 December 2001	22 May 2003	BNP	
Ministry of Women and Children Affairs	Alamgir Kabir	16 May 2006	14 June 2006	BNP	

=== Deputy Ministers ===
Portfolio	Name	Took office	Left office	Party
Ministry of Chittagong Hill Tracts Affairs	Moni Swapan Dewan	11 October 2001	29 October 2006	BNP
Ministry of Communications	Asadul Habib Dulu (Jamuna Bridge)	11 October 2001	3 February 2002	BNP
Ministry of Communications	Asadul Habib Dulu	3 February 2002	22 May 2003	BNP
Ministry of Local Government, Rural Development and Co-operatives	Ruhul Quddus Talukdar	11 October 2001	22 May 2003	BNP
Ministry of Education	Abdus Salam Pintu	11 October 2001	22 May 2003	BNP
Ministry of Food and Disaster Management	Asadul Habib Dulu	22 May 2003	29 October 2006	BNP
Ministry of Land	Ruhul Quddus Talukdar	22 May 2003	29 October 2006	BNP
Ministry of Industries	Abdus Salam Pintu	22 May 2003	13 March 2006	BNP
Ministry of Information	Abdus Salam Pintu	13 March 2006	29 October 2006	BNP
