= Rural Power Company Limited =

- Formation: 31 December 1994
- Headquarters: Dhaka, Bangladesh
- Region served: Bangladesh
- Official language: Bengali
- Website: Rural Power Company Limited

Rural Power Company Limited is an autonomous government company responsible for rural electrification and power in Bangladesh and is located in Dhaka, Bangladesh.

== Ownership ==
1. Rural Electrification Board
2. Dhaka Palli Bidyut Samity-1
3. Dhaka Palli Bidyut Samity-2
4. Narayanganj Palli Bidyut Samity-1
5. Comilla Palli Bidyut Samity-1
6. Chittagong Palli Bidyut Samity-1
7. Sunamganj Palli Bidyut Samity-1
8. Narsingdhi Palli Bidyut Samity-1
9. Dhaka Palli Bidyut Samity-3
10. Moulvibazar Palli Bidyut Samity

== History ==
Rural Power Company Limited was established on 31 December 1994. It was the first independent power producer in Bangladesh not under the Bangladesh Power Development Board. The decision to form it was made by Executive Committee of the National Economic Council (ECNEC) on 23 November 1994. It was formed by the Rural Electrification Board and is managed by a board of directors. On 23 December 2004 it started work on a power plant in Savar in partnership with Dhaka North Power Project and Swiss company Alsthom despite specific instructions and opinions from the Power Cell, Power Development Board and the Prime Minister's Office. Sigma Huda was its legal advisor. Lahmeyer International Palli Power Services Limited sued the company in October 2005 in an arbitration court in Singapore over the cancellation of the Mymensingh 140-megawatt power plant. Both companies had rivalries over the management of the power plant. The government of Bangladesh filed a case against the LIPPS chief AZ Rezaul Haq for attempting to sabotage the power plan and attempted to arrest him.

== Running Power Plant ==
1. Mymensingh Power Station
2. Gazipur 52 MW dual fuel power plant
3. Gazipur 105 MW Dual Fuel Power Plant
4. Raozan 25 MW HFO power Plant

== Under Construction (New Powerplant) ==
1. ময়মনসিংহ ৪২০ মেঃওঃ ডুয়েল-ফুয়েল(Gas/HSD) কম্বাইন্ড সাইকেল পাওয়ার প্লান্ট
2. পটুয়াখালী ১৩২০ মেঃওঃ কয়লা ভিত্তিক তাপবিদ্যুৎ কেন্দ্র
