= Md. Abdullah Al Masud Chowdhury =

Bangladeshi civil servant

Md. Abdullah Al Masud Chowdhury secretary of the Security Services Division of the Ministry of Home Affairs for Bangladesh. He was the additional secretary of the Security and Immigration Wing.

== Early life ==
Chowdhury was born in Chauddagram Upazila, Comilla District. He did his undergraduate and graduate studies in economics at the University of Dhaka. He completed a post-graduate diploma from Murdoch University.

== Career ==
Chowdhury joined the Bangladesh Civil Service in 1993.

Chowdhury was the Senior Assistant Head of Ministry of Health and Family Welfare. He was the deputy director of National Nutrition Project, funded by the World Bank. He was the economic counselor at the Bangladesh Embassy in Bangkok, Thailand.

Chowdhury was the Alternative Permanent Representative of Bangladesh to the United Nations Economic and Social Commission for Asia and the Pacific. He served as the deputy chief of the Energy and Mineral Resources Division and the Power Division.

In 2019, Chowdhury was the executive director of human resources at Dhaka Electric Supply Company Limited.

Chowdhury was appointed secretary of the Security Services Division of the Ministry of Home Affairs in July 2022. He replaced Md Mokabbir Hossain. He was serving as the additional secretary of the Security and Immigration Wing of the Security Services Division. He signed an agreement with United Arab Emirates in October for e-visa. He oversaw the launch of E-Passport services in the Bangladesh embassy in Portugal. He is a member of the governing body of the Bangladesh Investment Development Authority.

Chowdhury has asked the personnel of Fire Service and Civil Defence Department, which is under the Security Services Division, to be safe when discharging their duties.
