= Payra Power Plant =

Power plant in southern Bangladesh

Payra Power Station
- Country: Bangladesh
- Coordinates: 21°59′50.86″N 90°18′13.31″E
- Status: Operational
- Commission date: 2020
- Construction cost: $2.48 billion
- Owner: Bangladesh-China Power Company Limited (BCPCL)
- Operator: BCPCL

Thermal power station
- Primary fuel: Coal

Power generation
- Units operational: 2 x 660 MW
- Nameplate capacity: 1,320 MW

The Payra 1320 MW thermal power plant is a 1,320 megawatt coal-fired power station built in Kalapara Upazila of Patuakhali District in southern Bangladesh. It is a joint venture between the North-West Power Generation Company Bangladesh Limited (NWPGCL) and China National Machinery Import and Export Corporation (CMC). Till May 2023, this plant was producing 700 to 1000 megawatts of electricity every day.

== History ==
On 19 March 2015, a deal was signed between NWPGCL and the CMC to set up the Payra Power Plant. The joint venture was named Bangladesh-China Power Company Limited (BCPCL). On 29 March 2016, BCPCL signed an engineering, procurement and construction (EPC) contract with consortium of NEPC &CECC for the installation of the power plant.

== About ==
The plant consists of two units, each with a capacity of 660 MW. The initially estimated cost was around US$1.56 billion; the total project cost was US$2.48 billion. The plant has been built on an area of 397 hectare. The first unit became operational on the 15th May 2020 and the second on the 8th December 2020. It is the largest electricity generating unit of Bangladesh currently in operation. PM Sheikh Hasina inaugurated the plant on 21 March 2022.

== See also ==
- Electricity sector in Bangladesh
- List of power stations in Bangladesh
