= Ashuganj Power Station Company Limited =

Bangladeshi power company

- Formation: 28 June 2000
- Headquarters: Dhaka, Bangladesh
- Location: Ashuganj, Brahmanbaria-3402
- Region served: Bangladesh
- Official language: Bengali
- Managing Director (Additional Charge): Mohammad Sanaul Huq
- Main organ: Ministry of Power, Energy and Mineral Resources
- Parent organization: Power Division, Bangladesh Power Development Board (BPDB)
- Website: apscl.gov.bd

Ashuganj Power Station Company Limited is a state-owned power company in Bangladesh. The company headquarters are located in Paltan, Dhaka, Bangladesh. The company is under the authority of Bangladesh Power Development Board (BPDB).

== History ==
Ashuganj Power Station Company Limited was established on 28 June 2000 according to the Power Sector Development and Reform Program of the Government of Bangladesh. It was incorporated under the Companies Act, 1990. It is owned by BPDB, which controls 99.99% of the shares. The remaining .01% shares are owned by the Ministry of Planning, Ministry of Finance, Ministry of Power, Energy and Mineral Resources, Power Division, and Energy and Mineral Resources Division. It was created around Ashuganj Power Plant which was commissioned in 1987 and close to Titas Gas field. In 2011, the company launched a new 50 megawatt power plant in Ashuganj Upazila. In December 2012, the company received a $193-million loan from Standard Chartered Bank to set up a combined cycle power plant and $420-million loan from HSBC Bank.

In July 2017, the company signed an agreement with the China Energy Engineering Corporation, a state-owned Chinese company, to construct Patuakhali Power Plant. On 24 December 2018, Ashuganj Power Station Company Limited signed agreements with 8 financials institutions and banks to issue bonds and raise 4.15 billion taka. The purpose of the bonds is to raise funds for building new power plants. The company is constructing a 1200-megawatt power plant along the banks of Meghna River in Brahmanbaria District with TSK Spain. Its plant has faced criticism as a potential risk to Hilsha fish who inhabit the region and are the National fish of Bangladesh.
