= Habibur Rahman (civil servant) =

Bangladeshi civil servant

Habibur Rahman, also known as Md. Habibur Rahman, is a Bangladeshi civil servant and Secretary of the Power Division of the Ministry of Power, Energy and Mineral Resources. He is the chairperson of Bangladesh-China Renewable Energy Company (Pvt.) Limited.

== Early life ==
Rahman was born in Bangakha, Lakshmipur Sadar Upazila, Lakshmipur District. Rahman has a applied physics bachelor's and master's from the University of Dhaka. He completed a second master's from University of Birmingham in Economics development policy.

== Career ==
Rahman joined the Bangladesh Civil Service in 1991 as an administration cadre. He was appointed an assistant commissioner in the Office of the Rajshahi Divisional Commissioner. He served in the Office of the Natore District Deputy Commissioner till February 1993. Rahman was posted in the Office of the Refugee Relief and Repatriation Commissioner for one year.

From April 1994 to September 1996, Rahman served as the Assistant Commissioner of land in Habiganj Sadar Upazila. From 1996 to 1998, Rahman worked at the Bureau of Anti-Corruption. He then served in the Prime Ministers Office as an Assignment Officer till 2001 under Prime Minister Sheikh Hasina.

From January 2003 to September 2005, Rahman worked at Finance Division at the Ministry of Finance as a Senior Assistant Secretary. From February 2006 to May 2007, he worked at the Ministry of Education. He went to serve 15 years in the Ministry of Finance. In 2017, he received the Public Administration Award.

On 12 November 2020, Rahman was appointed Secretary of the Power Division of the Ministry of Power, Energy and Mineral Resources after being promoted to full secretary. He was serving as the additional secretary at the finance division of the Ministry of Finance. He replaced Dr Sultan Ahmed. He spoke of building charging stations for electric vehicles. He was later made Senior Secretary.
