= Abdullah al Mohsin Chowdhury =

Bangladeshi civil servant (1963–2020)

Abdullah al Mohsin Chowdhury (1 January 1963 – 29 June 2020) was a Bangladeshi civil servant. He was serving as Secretary of Defence from 12 January 2020, until his death from complications from COVID-19 in June 2020 during the ongoing COVID-19 pandemic in Bangladesh.

== Early life ==
Chowdhury was born in Chauddagram Upazila of Comilla District, East Pakistan (present-day Bangladesh) on 1 January 1963. He enrolled in Dhaka University, where he obtained a Bachelor of Science with honors in soil science in 1982 and his Master of Science in 1983. He later completed a Master of Arts (M.A.) in governance studies from Northern University in Dhaka.

== Career ==
Chowdhury joined the Administration cadre of the Bangladesh Civil Service in 1988.

Chowdhury then entered the Bangladeshi civil service. He served in various positions in the Ministry of Fisheries and Livestock, the Ministry of Finance, the Ministry of Industries, the Ministry of Health and Family Welfare, and the Prime Minister's Office.

More recently, Chowdhury served as the Secretary to the Ministry of Environment, Forest and Climate Change during the late 2010s prior to being appointed to the Ministry of Defence.

On 12 January 2020, Chowdhury was promoted to senior Defence Secretary for the Ministry of Defence, a position he held until his death in June 2020. He reported directly to Prime Minister Sheikh Hasina, who also manages the defense ministry as part of her portfolio.

== Personal life ==
Chowdhury's older brother, Kamal Abdul Naser Chowdhury, was the Principal Secretary to Prime Minister Sheikh Hasina. His younger brother Md. Abdullah Al Masud Chowdhury is secretary of Security division at Ministry of home affairs.

== Death ==
Chowdhury was admitted to Combined Military Hospital in Dhaka on 29 May 2020, and tested positive for COVID-19 on 2 June 2020. He was placed in intensive care on June 18 and treated with plasma therapy, but his condition continued to deteriorate. Chowdhury died at the hospital from cardiac arrest, a complication from COVID-19, on 29 June 2020, at the age of 57. He was survived by his wife, his daughter, and his son. Prime Minister Sheikh Hasina issued public condolences following his death.
