= EGCB =

EGCB may refer to:

- Manchester Barton Aerodrome, an airport and heliport in the United Kingdom
- Electricity Generation Company of Bangladesh, a utility company of Bangladesh
