= Bangladesh Power Development Board =

Government energy agency

- বাংলাদেশ বিদ্যুৎ উন্নয়ন বোর্ড; Bānlādēśa bidyuṯ unnaẏana bōrḍa
- Seal of Bangladesh Power Development Board

Agency overview
- Formed: 1972; 54 years ago
- Jurisdiction: Government of Bangladesh
- Headquarters: Wapda Building, Motijheel C/A, Dhaka, Bangladesh
- Agency executive: Engr. Md. Rezaul Karim, Chairman
- Parent department: Ministry of Power, Energy and Mineral Resources
- Website: www.bpdb.gov.bd

The Bangladesh Power Development Board (BPDB) is a Bangladesh government agency operating under the Ministry of Power, Energy and Mineral Resources. It was created in 1972 as a public-sector organization to boost the country's power sector after the emergence of Bangladesh as an independent state. This government organization is responsible for planning and developing the nation's power infrastructure and for operating much of its power generation facilities. The BPDB is responsible for the major portion of generation and distribution of electricity mainly in urban areas of the country.

Engr. Md. Rezaul Karim is the present chairman of the board. The board consists of Members and Directors from Bangladesh Administrative Service and from different cadres of government services.

== History ==
After the creation of Pakistan, the then Pakistan government formed Electricity directorate to develop the power sector of the country. In 1957, the electricity directorate acquired all the private power stations and transmission lines in the country. In 1958, the East Pakistan Water and Power Development Authority (EPWAPDA) was formed to effectively manage the power sector in the then East Pakistan. In 1960, the electricity directorate with all its assets was merged with EPWAPDA. Chattogram, Khulna and Shiddhirganj power stations was constructed at that time of which Shiddhirganj power station was the largest with 10MW installed capacity. In 1962, the Karnafuli Hydropower Station at Kaptai became operational. With two units of 40MW installed capacity each, it became the largest power plant in the country. The first long range transmission line was built connecting Kaptai with Shiddhirganj via 273 km long 132kV transmission line in 1962.

After the independence of Bangladesh, WAPDA was separated by presidential order 59 (PO-59) and Bangladesh Power Development Board (BPDB) was formed with an installed generation capacity of 500MW. Subsequently, the Rural Electrification Board (REB) and the Dhaka Electric Supply Authority (DESA) was formed dividing the BPDB. In 2000, the transmission lines were handed over to the newly formed Power Grid Company of Bangladesh. BPDB is now the parent company of Ashuganj Power Station Company Ltd, Coal Power Generation Company Bangladesh Limited, Power Grid Company of Bangladesh, Electricity Generation Company of Bangladesh, North West Power Generation Company Limited, North West Zone Power Distribution Company Limited, and West Zone Power Distribution Company Limited.

On 4 October 2022 70-80% of the countries 168 million residence were hit with blackouts and only 45% of residences were restored with power by nightfall. There was a shortage of natural gas because of the 2021–present global energy crisis where 77 natural gas power plants had insufficient fuel to meet demand. The electricity sector in Bangladesh is heavily reliant on natural gas. The government stopped buying spot price Liquefied natural gas in June 2022, they were importing 30% of their LNG on the spot market this year down from 40% last year. They are still importing LNG on futures exchange markets.

== Operations ==
BPDB is responsible for generation and distribution of a large part of country's total electricity demand. As of January 2020, BPDB had a total installed capacity of 5613 MW at its own power plants located in different parts of the country. The main fuel used for power generation in BPDB plants is indigenous natural gas. BPDP operations also include projects that utilize renewable power sources including offshore wind power generation. The maximum demand served during peak hours was 16,477 MW on 30 April 2024. The total distribution network length under BPDB is 30,051 km, including 33kV, 11kV and 0.4kV lines.

== See also ==
- WAPDA Sports Club
- Raozan power station
- Nuclear energy in Bangladesh
- Barapukuria Power Station
- Northwest Power Generation Company Limited
- Rooppur Nuclear Power Plant
- Dhaka Electric Supply Company Limited
- Dhaka Power Distribution Company
- West Zone Power Distribution Company Limited
