= Moin Uddin =

Moin Uddin may refer to:

- Moin Uddin (general)
- Moin Uddin (politician)
