= Raozan (disambiguation) =

Raozan is a town in Bangladesh. It may also refer to:

- Raozan Upazila, a upazila in Bangladesh
- Raozan Power Station, an airfield in Chittagong district
- Raozan Government College, a college in Bangladesh
- Raozan R.R.A.C Model Government High School, a school in Bangladesh
