= Ashuganj Power Station =

Power station in Bangladesh

Coordinates: 24.0431°N 91.0184°E

Ashuganj Power Station is located near to the Titas Gas Field and at the bank of river Meghna, Bangladesh. It consists of 1647 megawatt units. An agreement was signed in 1966 with a foreign construction company to establish a Thermal Power Plant in Ashuganj. It is owned and operated by Ashuganj Power Station Company Ltd.

== Plant status ==
Description	UNIT-2	UNIT-3	UNIT-4	UNIT-5	50 MW GE	225 MW CCPP	Ashuganj CCPP (South)	Ashuganj 450 MW CCPP (North)	200 MW Modular	Total
Date of Commissioning	July 8, 1970	December 17, 1986	May 4, 1987	March 21, 1988	March 2, 2011	April 20, 2015	July 18, 2016	June 11, 2017	May 8, 2016	
InstalledCapacity (MW)	64	150	150	150	53	223	382	389	195	1756
Present Capacity: Net Output (MW)	50	129	138	128	46	222	359	360	195	1647

=== Installed capacity ===
1876 MW

Present Capacity (Net Output)

1647 MW

Ongoing Projects : Ashuganj 400 MW CCPP (East) Land Acquisition, Land Development and Protection for Patuakhali 1320 MW Super Thermal Power Plant Project.

=== Corporate office ===
Navana Rahim Ardent (Level-8) 185, Shahid Syed Nazrul Islam Sarani (Old 39, Kakrail, Bijoy Nagar) Paltan, Dhaka

== See also ==
- Electricity sector in Bangladesh
- List of power stations in Bangladesh
