= Dhaka Power Distribution Company =

Dhaka Power Distribution Company Limited (DPDC)
- Company type: Public
- Industry: Electricity Distribution
- Founded: Dhaka, Dhaka Division, Bangladesh (October 25, 2005)
- Headquarters: Biddut Bhaban, 1 Abdul Gani Road, Dhaka-1000, Dhaka, Bangladesh.
- Area served: Dhaka South City Corporation, Narayangonj District (Partly).
- Number of employees: 5718 (As Per Manpower Setup), 5373 (Working as on 31.08.2023)
- Parent: Ministry of Power, Energy and Mineral Resources, Government of the People's Republic of Bangladesh
- Website: www.dpdc.gov.bd

Dhaka Power Distribution Company Limited (DPDC) is a Public Limited Company under the Power Division of the Ministry of Power, Energy and Mineral Resources, Government of Bangladesh, that manages the distribution of electricity to the customers of the Dhaka City Corporation area. The company, created as a part of the Power Sector Reform Programme, was registered on 25 October 2005 under the Companies Act, 1994. The government owns 100% share of the company. DPDC started commercial operation on 1 July 2008 taking over from Dhaka Electric Supply Authority (DESA). All the assets and liabilities of DESA were transferred to DPDC through an agreement signed in September 2008.

== History ==
The history of power generation and distribution in Dhaka city is eventful. Tradition goes that the Nawab of Dhaka introduced electricity in Dhaka in 1901 when he installed a small generator in his residence Ahsan Manzil. Power generation for public use started in 1930 when a privately owned company M/S DEVCO developed an electricity distribution system. Private companies managed power generation and distribution system in Dhaka until the end of British rule in 1947. In 1957 the Government of Pakistan took over the private owned companies in Dhaka and in 1959 they were placed under the newly established East Pakistan Water and Power Development Authority (EPWAPDA). After the liberation of Bangladesh, Bangladesh Power Development Board (BPDB) replaced EPWAPDA's Power wing in 1972. The power generation and distribution system of Dhaka was managed by BPDB until 1991. An autonomous organisation named Dhaka Electric Supply Authority (DESA) was created by an ordinance promulgated by the President in March 1990 to improve services to the consumers and to enhance revenue collection by reducing the prevailing high system loss. DESA took over the electricity distribution system in and around Dhaka city in October 1991, but the jurisdiction of power generation remained with BPDB. Later in 1998, a subsidiary company Dhaka Electric Supply Company Limited (DESCO) was formed to take over a few areas of the Dhaka city from DESA. And in 2008, DESA was abolished and replaced by DPDC.

At its of inception, DPDC area was about 7473 square kilometer in and around the capital city. Consequently, as per government decision, after handing over the city peripherals to Bangladesh Rural Electrification Board (BREB) and some parts of the Metropolitan area to Dhaka Electric Supply Company Ltd (DESCO), DPDC area is reduced to only around 350 square kilometer, expanded in the southern part of the capital city of Dhaka and adjoining townships of Narayangonj.

DESA, the ancestor of DPDC was established as part of a reform process to ensure better services to the electricity consumers, develop the power distribution system and reduce system loss. Before the setting up of DESA, the power development board suffered a system loss of 45%. DESA managed to cut it down to around 26%. But as it also became a losing concern due to various reasons, DPDC was introduced as part of the reform process to replace DESA. DPDC has managed to cut down the system loss to single digit in recent years.
