= Bangladesh Hydrocarbon Unit =

Government agency

Hydrocarbon Unit
- হাইড্রোকার্বন ইউনিট
- Formation: 1999
- Headquarters: Dhaka, Bangladesh
- Region served: Bangladesh
- Official language: Bengali
- Website: hcu.gov.bd

Hydrocarbon Unit is a government agency in the Ministry of Power, Energy and Mineral Resources responsible for providing the government of Bangladesh technical recommendations on the extraction of hydrocarbon resources and is located in Dhaka, Bangladesh. It carries out research on the gas and petroleum reserves of Bangladesh.

== History ==
The Hydrocarbon Unit traces its origin to a project called Strengthening of the Hydrocarbon Unit in the Ministry of Energy and Mineral Resources in July 1999. The project was financed by the government of Norway. The unit signed an agreement with the Norwegian Petroleum Directorate of the Ministry of Petroleum and Energy for technical assistance. The project ended in December 2005. From April 2006 the government of Bangladesh started the second phase of the project. The second phase was financed by a Norwegian Government grant and administered by the Asian Development Bank. The government made the project a permanent bureau of the ministry on 28 May 2008. It was awarded by Asian Development Bank as one of the performing projects.
