= Raozan Power Station =

Power station in Bangladesh

Chittagong Thermal Power Station
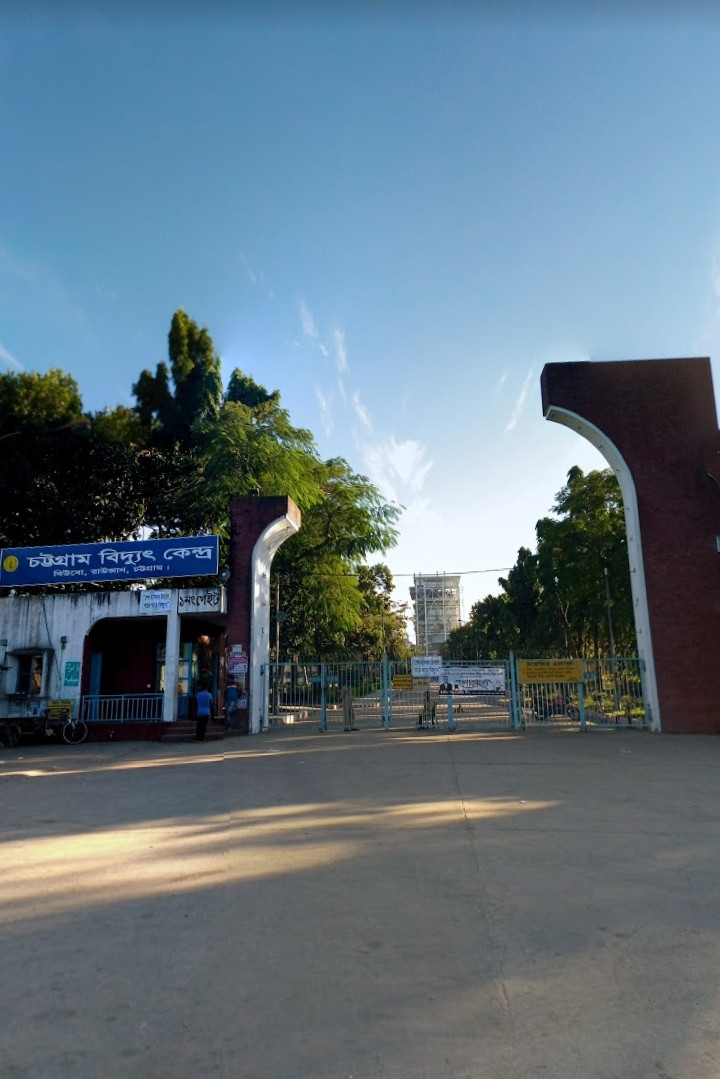
- Official name: Raozan Tap Biddyut Kendro
- Country: Bangladesh
- Location: Raozan Upazila of Chittagong District
- Coordinates: 22°27′35″N 91°58′44″E
- Commission date: 31 July 1993
- Owner: Government of the People’s Republic of Bangladesh
- Operator: Bangladesh Power Development Board

Thermal power station
- Primary fuel: Natural gas

Power generation
- Units operational: 2 X 210 MW
- Make and model: Dong Fang
- Nameplate capacity: 420 MW

External links
- Commons: Related media on Commons

Raozan Power Station is a gas-fired thermal power station in Bangladesh. It is located in Raozan Upazila of Chattogram District 25 kilometres (16 mi) north-east from Chattogram on the south side of the Chattogram–Kaptai Highway. It is owned and operated by the state-owned Bangladesh Power Development Board.

== History ==
Construction of the power station started on 1 February 1990 and the first unit was commissioned on 31 July 1993. It was constructed and credited by the China National Machinery and Equipment Import and Export Corporation.

== Technical features ==
The power station consists of two identical gas-fired units with an initial capacity of 210 MW and a generating capacity of 180 MW. It is supplied from the Bakhrabad and Feni gas fields, and from the Sangu offshore field.

The N210-12.9-538/538 super high-pressure intermediate reheat condensing, three-cylinder double exhaustion turbo set turbine, installed at Unit 1, was manufactured by Dong Fang of China. It has a rated capacity of 210 MW and a normal speed of 3,000 RPM. The steam flow at the rated parameter at full load is 652.5 t/h at the temperature of 538 °C (1,000 °F) with a live steam pressure of 12.9 MPa. The turbine was delivered in July 1991.

The boiler is a DG-680/13.7-14 type of super high pressure, one intermediate re-heat cycle and single drum natural cyclic type boiler manufactured by Dong Fang of China. It has a steam generating capacity of 680 t/h generating 541 °C (1,006 °F) 13.73 MPa pressured steam at the boiler outlet. At full load, it consumes 52695.4m^{3}/h of natural gas. The efficiency of the boiler is rated at 94.93%. Transformers are manufactured by Shen Yang of China.

== See also ==
- Electricity sector in Bangladesh
- List of power stations in Bangladesh
