= Sabihuddin Ahmed (general) =

Bangladeshi army officer

- Died: 30 May 2008; Baltimore, U.S
- Military career
- Allegiance: Bangladesh; Pakistan (before 1971)
- Branch: Pakistan Army; Bangladesh Army; National Defence Force
- Service years: 1961-1986
- Rank: Brigadier General
- Unit: Corps of Engineers
- Commands: Deputy Commander of National Defense Force; Commander of 14th Independent Engineers Brigade; Chairman of Bangladesh Rural Electrification Board
- Conflicts: Bangladesh Liberation War

Sabihuddin Ahmed was a one star officer of the Bangladesh Army and one of the directors of Jatiya Rakkhi Bahini. He was the founding chairman of Bangladesh Rural Electrification Board.

== Career ==
After the Independence of Bangladesh, President Sheikh Mujibur Rahman appointed Ahmed to the Jatiya Rakkhi Bahini led by Brigadier General A. N. M. Nuruzzaman. The Jatiya Rakkhi Bahini was a special paramilitary force composed of veterans of the Bangladesh Liberation War. The force was assimilated into the Bangladesh Army after the assassination of Sheikh Mujibur Rahman in the 15 August 1975 Bangladeshi coup d'état. In 1977, President Ziaur Rahman asked Ahmed to head the recently established Rural Electrification Board. He agreed on the condition that he would have complete autonomy to operate the organization. He was appointed chairman of the Bangladesh Rural Electrification Board. The United States Agency for International Development provided US$50 million at the beginning of the program. The Asian Development Bank, the World Bank, Kuwait, and Finland provided US$280 million in additional funding. The government of Bangladesh provided an additional US$132 million.

Ahmed served as the chairman of Bangladesh Rural Electrification Board from 2 January 1978 to 25 June 1986 and was replaced by Brigadier General Mohammad Abdul Halim. He met Senator Larry Lee Pressler on his tour of Dhaka in 1985.

Ahmed received a heart transplant in the United States with the help of United States National Co-Operatives of Rural Electrification, partner agency of the Rural Electrification Board official, James Cudney.

== Death ==
Ahmed died on 30 May 2008 in Maryland, United States. There is a Brigadier General Sabihuddin Ahmed Hall at the Rural Electrification Board headquarters in Dhaka.
