= Dhaka Electric Supply Company Limited =

Electric utility in Dhaka, Bangladesh

- Company type: Public
- Traded as: DSE: DESCO CSE: DESCO
- Industry: Electricity Distribution
- Founded: (November 3, 1996; 29 years ago) in Dhaka, Bangladesh
- Headquarters: Nikunja-2, Dhaka, Bangladesh
- Area served: Parts of Northern Dhaka, Purbachal, and Tongi
- Revenue: 2013: ▲US$ 311.1279 million
- Operating income: 2014: ▼US$ 14.508 million
- Net income: 2013: ▼US$ 10.349 million
- Total assets: 2013: ▲US$ 435.479 million
- Total equity: 2013: ▲US$ 138.471 million
- Number of employees: 1573 (2013)
- Parent: Bangladesh Ministry of Power, Energy and Mineral Resources
- Website: desco.org.bd

Dhaka Electric Supply Company Limited (DESCO) is a public limited company which distributes electricity in the northern parts of Dhaka City and Tongi Town of Gazipur District. The company was created in November 1996 under the Companies Act 1994 as a public limited company. The company is now under the Power Division of the Bangladesh Ministry of Power, Energy and Mineral Resources and serving a total of 604,304 consumers as of 31 December 2013. Md. Selim Uddin, rank of additional secretary, is the chairperson of DESCO and Engr. Md. Kausar Ameer Ali is the managing director.

== Background ==
Highlighted events
Year	Events
2013	Online application for recruitment.
2012	Online application for new connection.
2010	Launching online bill payment system.
2008	Inauguration of Data Acquisition System.
2007	Takeover of Tongi Pourashava and distribution licence from BERC.
2006	Company goes public.
2005	Inauguration of prepaid metering system.
2004	Establishment of sales & distribution divisions.
2003	Takeover of Gulshan area.
1998	Takeover of Mirpur area from DESA.
1996	Certificate of incorporation.

In 1972, the first Government of Bangladesh, in an effort to speed up the investment in the sector issued an ordinance, creating the Bangladesh Power Development Board (BPDB). BPDB, from 1972 to 1995, has increased the generation capacity in the country from 475 MW to 2818 MW, and the length of its 230 kV and 132 kV transmission networks to 419 km and 2469 km respectively. For the first time in December 1982, the eastern and western halves of the country were electrically connected through the commissioning of double circuit 230 kV transmission line across the Jamuna River energized at 132 kV between Ishurdi and Tongi called the first East-West Inter-connector. Thus 230 kV and 132 kV inter-ties linked the distribution networks of all major towns and cities had been through.

But from 1986 onwards, the commercial performance of the BPDB deteriorated and in 1991, BPDB's average gross systems loss was about 42 percent and accounts receivables in excess of 6.5 months of billing. This performance was not found reasonable to the covenants agreed by the Government and BPDB with the Asian Development Bank and the World Bank.

So in 1990, another ordinance was issued, which was subsequently enacted as an Act transferring the 132 kV, 33 kV transmission and distribution system in the Greater Dhaka Area including the Metropolitan City to a newly created Government agency called the Dhaka Electric Supply Authority (DESA). This was done to lessen the administrative burden on BPDB's management by relieving it of the burden of managing about 50 percent of the energy distribution of the entire country.

With the economy performing very well during 1992–95, the demand for electricity grew substantially. Faced with a grim possibility of serious electricity shortages during the next few years and to enable the sector to be financially self-sustaining and also attract private capital, the cabinet approved in principle, the inter-ministerial committee report named "Power Sector Reforms in Bangladesh (PSRB)".

In the meanwhile, the performance of BPDB and DESA have slowly but steadily improved, although they are by no means near international levels of performance. In view of this Improvement and the restructuring effort announced by the Government, the development partners have agreed to resume funding to the sector based on the principle of "Reforms Fundina Linkaaes" i.e. every project funded by these partners would have components addressing the reforms decided upon by the Government. The Project has been linked to redefining the franchise area of DESA and handing over of distribution networks outside Metropolitan Dhaka City to Rural Electrification Board (REB), and formation of a corporatized Dhaka Electric Supply Company (DESCO) which will initially take over part of the distribution network of DESA and ultimately take over all its assets. The formation of this company is seen as an essential step towards " Corporatization and Commercialization" of the sector and to reduce the excessive inefficiently in the distribution network in the capital.

== Organizational structure and workforce management ==
Name of zones and S&D divisions
Name of zone	Name of S&D division
Gulshan	Badda
Gulshan	Baridhara
Gulshan	Joarshahara
Gulshan	Gulshan
Mirpur	Agargaon
Mirpur	Kafrul
Mirpur	Monipur
Mirpur	Pallabi
Mirpur	Rupnagar
Mirpur	Shah Ali
Uttara	Dakshinkhan
Uttara	Tongi (East)
Uttara	Tongi (West)
Uttara	Uttara (East)
Uttara	Uttara (West)
Uttara	Uttarkhan

The company's formal organizational structure involves a hierarchical system. The chairman and the board of directors make up the top of this structure. The executive head of the organization is the managing director, under whom five executive directors, two general managers, two chief engineers, twelve superintending engineers, two deputy general managers and one company secretary operate the executive duties.

To increase effectiveness in its field activities, DESCO has established 16 sales and distribution (S&D) divisions under 3 operational zones.

=== Operational zone and sales & distribution (S&D) division ===
The superintending engineer is in charge of a zone who supervises the executive engineers, the key responsible person of each S&D Division. Each executive engineer accomplishes his duties by two sub-divisional engineers, one for system related activities and another for commercial-related activities. Two assistant engineers act as assisting body under each sub-divisional engineer.

System related activities include scheduled maintenance, troubleshooting and breakdown maintenance of substation and switching stations, troubleshooting of customer complaints, line and equipment maintenance etc. Commercial-related activities include meter reading, distribution of monthly electricity bills, service disconnection of the defaulter consumer, customers' house wiring inspection, new electric connection, meter installation, change of old or unserviceable meter etc.

DESCO has outsourced a group of experienced workers for field level activities, including other logistic support services like security service, cleaning service and partial transport service. To this end, DESCO engaged in several experienced contractors through competitive bidding process. With the proper maintenance of the distribution system, service complaints from consumers have been reduced significantly.

The procedure for new connection has been simplified to achieve greater consumer satisfaction and efforts are on to further reduce the average time now taken. DESCO team tries their best to give a new connection within 21 working days. To make it more simple and quick DESCO has launched "Online Application" on 23 February 2012 for new connection and DESCO is the first distribution company in the country which has started it.

=== ICT division ===
The company has a group of IT experts for management information systems (MIS) and for developing new software on demand. "E-Governance" is such software developed by the DESCO IT team which has simplified the new connection-related job in a very smart way. This team is also continuously working for better complaint management, monthly bill process and collection, miscellaneous bill collection and correction, maintaining the DESCO website and E-mail Communication, and setting up inter-office Wide Area Network (WAN) Connectivity. DESCO website is Secure Sockets Layer (SSL) protected and a consumer can pay their monthly bill easily online using debit or credit cards.

=== Substation & network division ===
Name of divisional control centers
Name of zone	Name of control center
Mirpur	Mirpur Control (Kafrul)
Mirpur	Agargaon Control
Uttara	Uttara Control
Uttara	Tongi Control
Gulshan	Gulshan Control
Gulshan	Baridhara Control

DESCO has 26 33/11 kV substations and it has a separate division named Substation & Network to maintain these substations. The division has an Superintending Engineer under the Chief Engineer, Network Operation. This division is divided into two departments: Medium Voltage Substation Maintenance & Commissioning (MVSSMC) and Grid & Protection (G & P). Services including electric power substation inspection, troubleshooting of any equipment operation, testing of any substation relay for proper operation, testing and commissioning, test reporting are done by these two departments.

DESCO's Central Control, located at Gulshan, is under the Substation & Network division for optimal scheduling and dispatch of electricity among the 6 divisional control centers. To enable this, the control centre is equipped with a reliable communication network, an accurate data acquisition system (DAS) and a visual display system for live data received from various locations. It was also proposed that a fully equipped supervisory control and data acquisition (SCADA) system was established, for a more reliable and faster data processing and data formatting system.

=== Development & project and Planning & design division ===
Electricity is a constantly developing technology and to be consistent with this development DESCO has two separate division for Development & Project and Planning & Design. A project is typically managed by the project division in the five following steps:

1. Identification of need and development of the concept.
2. Analysis of the options and approval.
3. Implementation.
4. Evaluation.
5. Future plans.

DESCO has completed a study to ascertain load demand and consumer growth in the area up to the year 2030 with 5 years phasing. The report shows that the load demand of DESCO will increase to 1,129 MVA by the year 2015, to 1,910 MVA by the year 2020, to 3,489 MVA by the year 2025 and to 6,288 MVA by the year 2030. Accordingly, DESCO has prepared a plan to cater this increasing load demand. For this purpose, 117 new 33/11 kV substations and 28 new 132/33 kV grid substations will be required along with upgrades of some existing substations. Presently a number of projects are in an implementation stage under the "Sustainable Power Sector Development Program" (SPSDP) and on turnkey basis by DESCO's own fund. In partnership with others, the Planning & Design division supports to plan and implement these projects in a disciplined way.

== Controversy ==
On 24 January 2000, three senior officials including the managing director of DESCO were fired for failure to perform their duty. In 2008, Senior Special Judge Mohammad Azizul Haque issued arrest warrants against the managing director of DESCO Saleh Ahmed, former Chairman of Dhaka Electricity Supply Authority (the predecessor of DESCO) Towhidul Islam, and thirteen others.

In 2016, the Government plan to replace all electric meters with prepaid ones ran into trouble due to lack of skilled manpower and corruption. The low-level DESCO employees also feared being laid off after the installation of prepaid meters. On 13 January 2020, Bangladesh Anti Corruption Commission raided the office of DESCO over the alleged purchase of substandard prepaid electricity meters.

In March 2017, three employees of DESCO, Director General AHM Nurul Huda executive director Rafiuddin, and manager Khandaker Nazibul Alam, were suspended on allegations of embezzling 9.1 million taka from the company.

Following the COVID-19 pandemic in Bangladesh DESCO meter readers could not read the electric meters in-person during the lock down so DESCO made bills based on estimates leading to "exorbitant bills" for consumers.

== See also ==
- Bangladesh Power Development Board
- Electricity sector in Bangladesh
- List of power stations in Bangladesh
- Power Grid Company of Bangladesh
- West Zone Power Distribution Company
