= Bangladesh Petroleum Institute =

Research institute in Bangladesh

- Abbreviation: BPI
- Formation: 1981
- Headquarters: Uttara, Dhaka, Bangladesh
- Region served: Bangladesh
- Official language: Bengali
- Website: https://bpi.gov.bd/

Bangladesh Petroleum Institute (BPI) is an autonomous national research institute that carries out research on hydrocarbon and provide technical assistance to organizations in the petroleum industry and is located in Uttara, Dhaka, Bangladesh.

== History ==
The institute was created in January 1981, it is under the Ministry of Energy and Mineral Resources of Bangladesh. In 2004 Bangladesh Petroleum Institute act was passed by the parliament which made allocated more resource to skill development in the oil, gas and petroleum industry.

== Activities ==
The institute was established with the objective of training workers and craftsmen engaged in Bangladesh's energy sector, conducting research on the potential for hydrocarbon acquisition, conducting advanced surveys on development, innovating technology-based information systems and subsequent operational activities, and providing technical and technological support to institutions related to energy activities. By 2015, the BPI had trained 2,822 energy professionals through 181 training courses, workshops, and seminars.

The organization usually organizes a dozen training courses every year on various topics including geology, geophysics, geochemistry, energy engineering, well logging, mining engineering, energy management, pipeline engineering, gas transmission and distribution, accounting and finance, safety and environment, and project management. In conducting these training courses, it utilizes its own trainers as well as experienced trainers in the energy sector and foreign professionals. In addition, the organization sends its experienced trainers as instructor representatives to various energy-related organizations or companies abroad. The BPI headquarters are located in Uttara Model Town in its own premises.
