= Bureau of Mineral Development =

Government bureau in Dhaka, Bangladesh

- Formation: 1962; 64 years ago
- Headquarters: Dhaka, Bangladesh
- Region served: Bangladesh
- Official language: Bengali
- Website: bomd.gov.bd

Bureau of Mineral Development (Bengali: খনিজ সম্পদ উন্নয়ন ব্যুরো) is a government bureau responsible for the management and generation of revenue from mineral resources and is located in Dhaka, Bangladesh.

== History ==
Bureau of Mineral Development was established in 1962 under the Ministry of Industry of Pakistan. After the Independence of Bangladesh it was placed under the Ministry of Power, Energy and Mineral Resources of Bangladesh. The Bureau is governed by the Mines and Minerals (Regulation and Development) Act, 1992 and the Mines and Minerals Rules, 2012.
