= S M Zia-Ul-Azim =

Bangladeshi military personnel

Zia-Ul-Azim
- Military career
- Allegiance: Bangladesh
- Branch: Bangladesh Army
- Service years: 1990–2026
- Rank: Major General
- Unit: Corps of Electrical Mechanical Engineers
- Commands: Chairman of Bangladesh Rural Electrification Board; Commandant of 901st Central EME Workshop

S M Zia-Ul-Azim (Bengali: এস এম জিয়া-উল আজিম) is a retired major general of the Bangladesh Army. He served as the chairman of the Bangladesh Rural Electrification Board.

== Career ==
S M Zia-Ul-Azim holds the position of chairman of the Bangladesh Rural Electrification Board (BREB). He also serves as the colonel commandant of the Corps of Electrical Mechanical Engineers within the Bangladesh Army.

Zia-Ul-Azim is an officer from the 23rd BMA Long Course and belongs to the Electrical Mechanical Engineers Corps. He has been involved in distributing relief materials to flood-affected areas in his capacity as BREB chairman. He previously served as the dean of the Faculty of Science and Engineering and head of the Department of Biomedical Engineering (BME) at the Military Institute of Science and Technology (MIST).

=== UN peacekeeping missions ===
Azim has served in UN peacekeeping missions. As a contingent member, he served in Sierra Leone. As a military observer, he served for a short period in Liberia and Syria, and as a staff officer, he served at the Force Headquarters in Mali.

== Family life ==
SM Zia-ul Azim is married and has one son.
