= Sustainable and Renewable Energy Development Authority =

- Formation: 2012
- Headquarters: Dhaka, Bangladesh
- Region served: Bangladesh
- Official language: Bengali
- Website: Sustainable and Renewable Energy Development Authority

Sustainable and Renewable Energy Development Authority (Bengali: টেকসই ও নবায়নযোগ্য জ্বালানি উন্নয়ন কর্তৃপক্ষ) is a Bangladesh government agency under the Ministry of Power, Energy and Mineral Resources, responsible for increasing renewable energy production in Bangladesh. It also acts as the regulatory agency for the sustainable energy industry. Md. Helal Uddin is the chairman of the Sustainable and Renewable Energy Development Authority.

== History ==
In 2009, the Government of Bangladesh developed a Renewable Energy Policy which calls for renewable energy to be 10 percent of the total energy produced in Bangladesh. The government established the Sustainable and Renewable Energy Development Authority to support the Renewable Energy Policy through the Sustainable and Renewable Energy Development Authority Act in 2012. Bangladesh also joined the International Energy Agency after the agency was founded.
