= List of power stations in Bangladesh =

Location of power stations in Bangladesh:
coal, gas, nuclear, hydroelectric, biomass

This is a list of power stations in Bangladesh.

== Nuclear ==
Under construction

No	Power station	Location	Capacity (MW)	Units	Year	Refs
1	Rooppur Nuclear Power Plant	Rooppur	2400	2 units 1200 MW VVER-1200/523	2024	

== Coal fired ==
Power station	Location	Capacity (MW)	Turbines	Coal type	Plant type	Year	Refs
Barapukuria Power Station	Durgapur, Dinajpur	525		Anthracite			
Rampal Power Station	Rampal Upazila, Bagerhat District	1320		Sub-bituminous	Ultra super critical	2023	
Payra Power Plant	Kalapara Upazila, Patuakhali District	1320		Sub-bituminous	Ultra super critical	2020	
Matarbari Power Station	Maheshkhali Upazila, Cox's Bazar District	1200		Sub-bituminous	Ultra super critical	2023	

== Oil and gas-fired thermal ==
Power station	Location	Capacity (MW)	Refs
Ashuganj Power Station	Brahmanbaria	1627	
Ghorasal	Ghorasal	950	
Shikalbaha	Shikalbaha, Chattagram	150	
Siddhirganj	Siddhirganj	260	
Orion Group (4 plant)	Narayangonj & Khulna	400	
Lakdhanavi Bangla Power Limited	Comilla	52.2	
Desh Energy Chandpur Power Company Ltd.	Chandpur	200	
Doreen Power Generations and Systems Limited Group (3 plant)	Nababganj, Manikganj & Munshiganj	165	
Feni Lanka Power Limited	Feni	114	
Manikganj Power Generations Limited	Manikganj	162	
Bhairab Power Limited	Bhairab	55	
Payra LNG Power Plant	Kalapara Upazila Patuakhali District	3600	

== Gas turbines ==
Power station	Max. capacity (MW)	Turbines	Fuel type	Refs
Meghnaghat	450	2+1	natural gas	
Ashuganj	146	2+1	natural gas	
Haripur	360	1+1	natural gas	
Goalpara, Khulna	265		heavy fuel oil (HFO)	
Mymensingh	210	4+1	natural gas	
Siddhirganj	240		natural gas	

== Gas engines ==
Power station	Max. capacity (MW)	Engines	Fuel type	Refs
Baraka Power Ltd.	51	16	natural gas	
Dhaka	7	2	natural gas	
Gazipur	53	6	natural gas	
Gopalganj	100	16	natural gas	
Maona	35	4	natural gas	
Raozan	240	6	natural gas	
Ghorashal Regent	108	34	natural gas	
Baghabari, Sirajgonj	50		natural gas	
APSCL, Ashuganj	50		natural gas	

== Hydroelectric ==
Power station	Max. capacity (MW)	Turbines	Refs
Karnafuli	230	5	

== Solar PV ==
There are a number of utility-scale solar PV farms proposed in Bangladesh: 28 MW Teknaf Solar Park, 50 MW Sutiakhali, Mymensingh Solar Park and 32 MW Sunamganj Solar Park. US company SunEdison was the sponsor of the 200 MW Teknaf project while Singapore based entities Sinenergy Holdings, Ditrolic and local company IFDC Solar are the sponsors of the 50 MW Sutiakhali Solar Park. Edisun Power Point & Haor Bangla - Korea Green Energy Ltd is the 32 MW Sunamganj solar park project.

The government has taken a total of 19 solar power projects of total 1070 MW capacity which got the Prime Minister's approval in principle as part of its plan to generate 10 percent electricity from renewable energy source by 2020.

Of these, power purchase agreements (PPAs) were signed for only six projects of 532 MW, while nine projects of 483 MW await the PPA signing and four are in the process of project selection committee. Sun Solar Power Plant Ltd. installed a 5 MW solar power plant in Sylhet.

== Combined cycle ==
Power station	Location	Capacity (MW)	Refs
Bheramara Combined Cycle Power Plant	Kushtia	410	
Fenchugonj Combined Cycle Power Plant	Sylhet	180	
Haripur 412 MW Combined Cycle Power Plant	Narayanganj	412	
Siddhirganj 335 MW Combined Cycle Power Plant (CCPP)	Narayanganj	335	
Khulna 225 MW Combined Cycle Power Plant	Khulna	225	

== See also ==
- Electricity sector in Bangladesh
- Energy policy of Bangladesh
