= Rooppur pillow scandal =

Bangladeshi corruption scandal

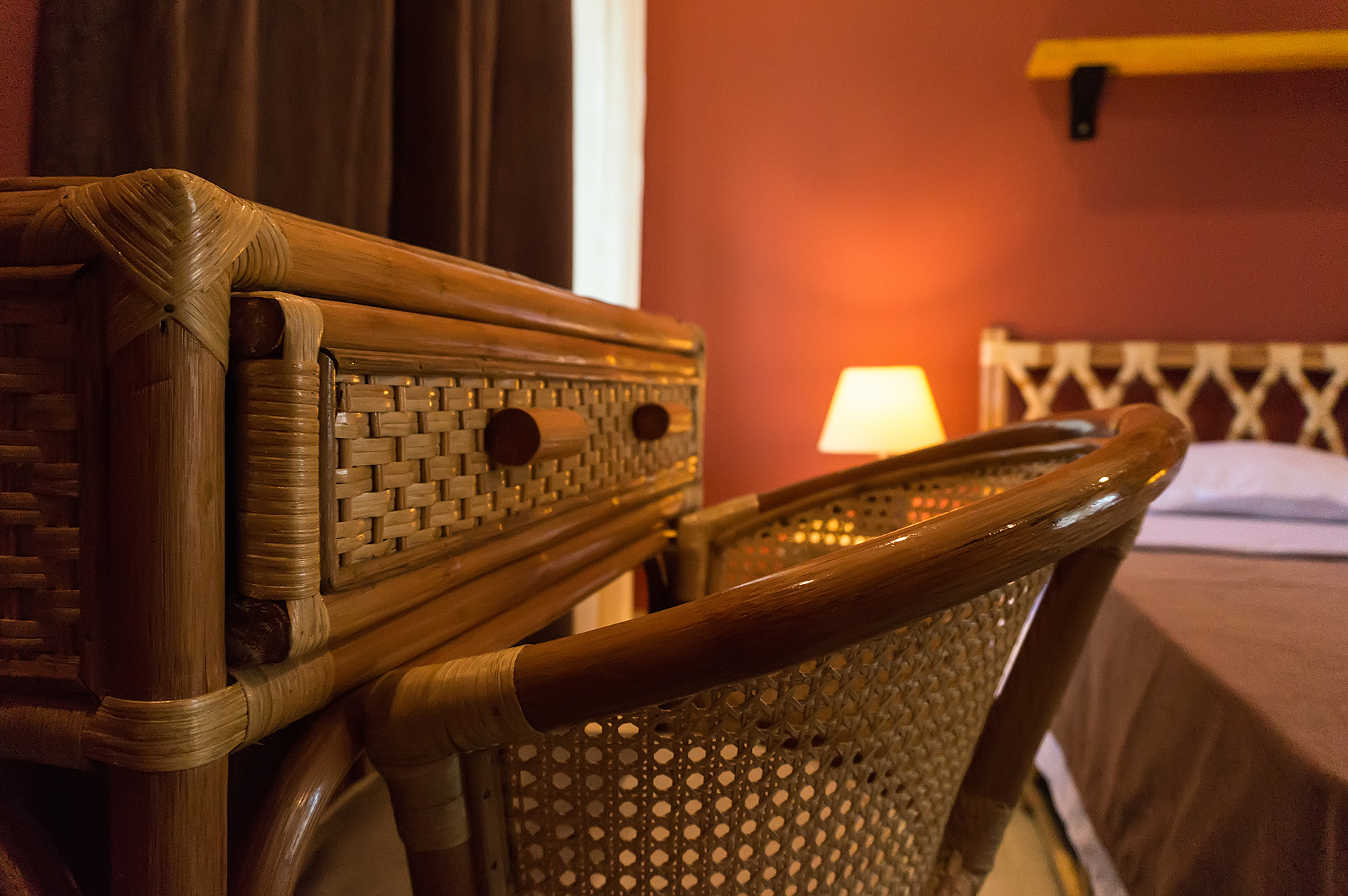
A room in Rooppur Nuclear Power Plant's residential village

In 2019, newspapers and netizens of Bangladesh alleged that an excess of ৳26 crore (equivalent to ৳34 crore or US$2.8 million in 2023) was spent on the construction of residential areas for Rooppur Nuclear Power Plant, which is Bangladesh's first nuclear power plant. The allegations and further events became popularly known as the Rooppur pillow scandal in the country. In December 2019, the Anti Corruption Commission arrested 13 people for corruption and the matter remains sub judice.

== Background ==
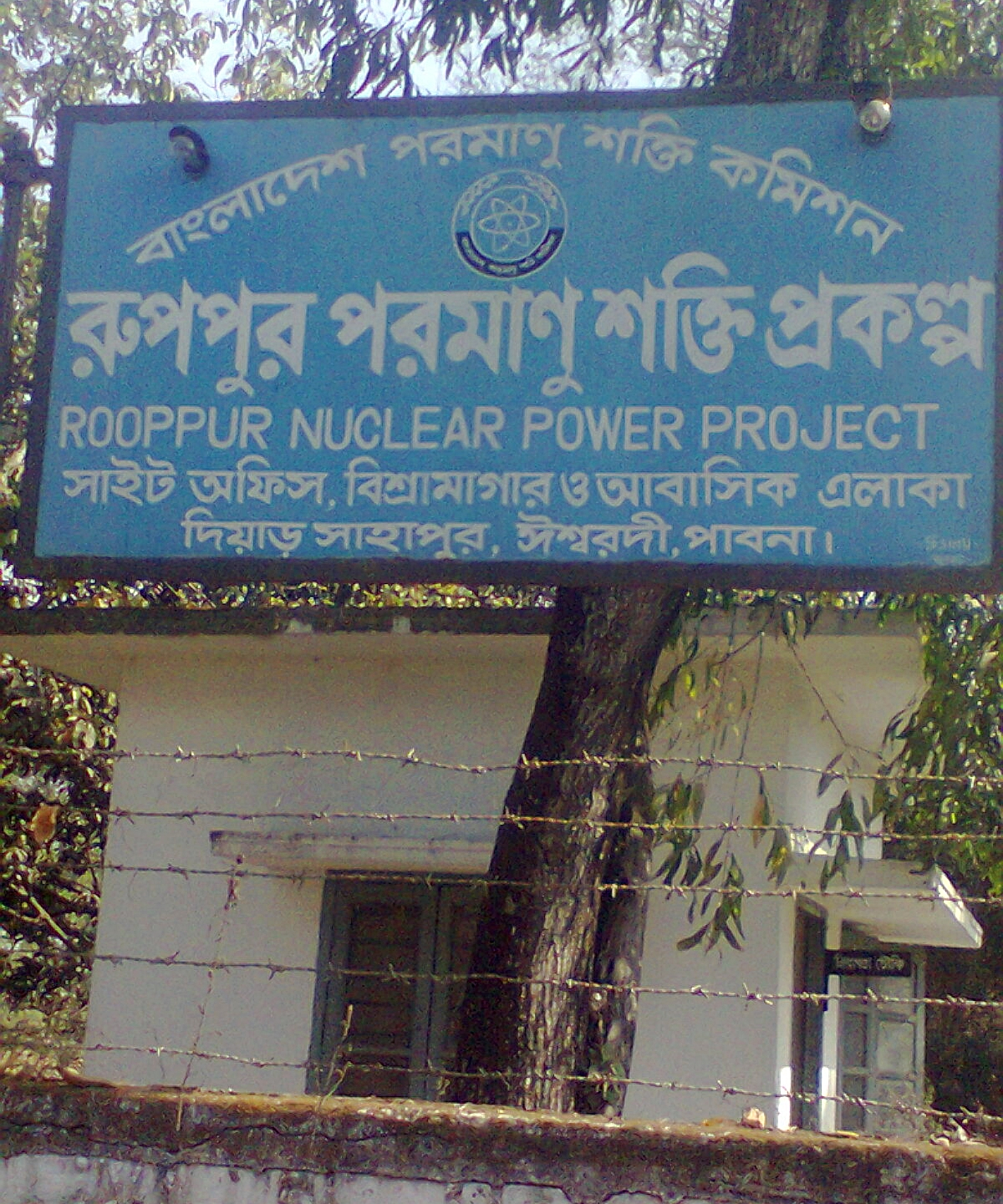
Rooppur Nuclear Power Plant (ongoing construction)

In 2016, ground preparation work of the nuclear power plant at Rooppur commenced. The Russian government would fund the 90 percent of the $12.65 billion contract through loan. The two units generating 2.4 GWe are planned to be operational in 2023 and 2024. Russian corporation Rosatom will operate the units for the first year before Bangladeshi operators take over. Russia will supply the nuclear fuel and retrieve spent nuclear fuel.

== Scandal ==
The documents of the housing project, called Green City, were published in May 2019, and excessive prices listed in the documents prompted allegations of corruption. In 2019, the Bangladesh Citizen Council's convener priced an average pillow as costing from ৳250 (equivalent to ৳330 or US$2.70 in 2023) to ৳300 (equivalent to ৳400 or US$3.30 in 2023). But the documented price of each pillow was ৳5957 (US$49), approximately 20 times the market value. An exorbitant amount of ৳931 (US$7.70) was documented as the cost of transportation per pillow to the housing complex. Cots were priced at ৳43357 (US$360) and dining table sets were documented to be of ৳114674 (US$940). According to the ministry's expenditure policy, the central authority must approve purchases above ৳30 crore (US$2.5 million). To circumvent this, the purchase of ৳30 crore was split into five parts. Three contracting companies were hired to purchase the products. Among these, the goods supplied by Sajin Enterprise were of low quality. Media outlets including Prothom Alo and Pabna Samachar reported that Golam Faruk Khandakar Prince, MP of the area, was involved with this organization. Another contractor, Majid Sons, was reported to have been negligent in the supply of construction products.

== Reaction ==
=== Authorities ===
The Secretary of the Ministry of Science and Technology assured action against the accused of the incident. The then Secretary of the Housing and Public Works Ministry claimed to have formed a committee to determine the price of the products. However, no comment about its progress was made. Shawkat Akbar, project director of the Rooppur Nuclear Power Plant, said the documented expenditure was not unreasonable. He also said that he would be held accountable to the Planning Commission. According to the newspaper Jugantor, the people of authority think that Mosharraf Hossain should take responsibility for the incident as he was the minister of Public Works during the scandal.

=== People ===
Iftekharuzzaman, the executive director of Transparency International Bangladesh, expressed concern over the corruption. The people of Bangladesh trolled and shared memes about the scandal. Economist Khondaker Ibrahim Khaled, former Deputy Governor of Bangladesh Bank, said that corruption in Bangladesh will increase if the government does not reprimand the scandal's offenders. On 20 May 2019, two organizations in Dhaka began protests against the corruption and held pillows in their march. Protesters described this corruption as the "greatest loot in history".

== Aftermath ==
After the scandal, the government formed a three-member committee to investigate. They released a report on 23 July 2019, which suggested a list of 33 people involved with the scam. On 7 November, the Anti Corruption Commission summoned them to their office for further questioning. Three days later, the accused executive engineer Masudul Alam was questioned. On 12 December, the Anti Corruption Commission arrested 13 people for corruption: one executive engineer, three sub-divisional engineers, four deputy engineers, three assistant engineers and two contractors. The project was sued for corruption and money embezzlement. According to the ministry, the accused seized around ৳36 crore (US$3.0 million) from the project.

After the arrest, deputy engineer Shafiqul Islam applied for bail. The High Court denied the bail on 5 July 2020. On 25 October 2021, Samakal reported the accused contractor had returned the money from the purchase. Shahadat Hossain of Sajin Construction was granted bail on 28 August 2020. In September, the Anti Corruption Commission appealed this, seeking the bail's cancellation. The High Court then ruled in favour of the Commission and the bail was canceled and further appealed to ban international travels for Hossain. In the same month, the High Court gave the government six months to resolve three cases in the scam.
