= 14th Independent Engineers Brigade =

Bangladesh Military brigade

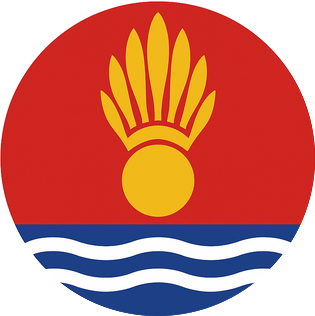
- Insignia of 14th Independent Engineers Brigade
- Active: 1972 - present
- Country: Bangladesh
- Branch: Bangladesh Army
- Type: Combat Engineers
- Size: Brigade
- Garrison/HQ: Dhaka Cantonment
- Engagements: 1972–1975 Bangladesh insurgency; First Siege of Dhaka; Second Siege of Dhaka; 1982 Bangladeshi coup d'état; July Revolution

Commanders
- Current commander: Brig Gen Syed Fazle Gaus
- Notable commanders: Col Majid-ul-Haq; Col Sabihuddin Ahmed; Brig Gen Siddiqur Rahman Sarker; Brig Gen Rezaul Mazid

The 14th Independent Engineers Brigade is an independent brigade formation of the Bangladesh Army. It operates under the direct command of Army Headquarters and is primarily based at the Dhaka Cantonment. The brigade provides specialised engineering support, including infrastructure construction, bridging, mine warfare, and disaster response.

== History ==
The 14th Independent Engineers Brigade was established in 1972 after Bangladesh declared independence. The bridge has been an active component of the Army's structure since at least the early 2010s.

== Role and operations ==
The brigade's primary roles include providing engineering expertise for military operations, civil works, and humanitarian assistance.

The brigade has supported domestic urban development projects such as a 2022 initiative to reclaim encroached canals in Dhaka under the direction of the city mayor.

The unit also assists in law enforcement. In November 2024, it led a joint task force raid in Dhaka's Korail Bosti area, arresting nine drug traffickers wanted in multiple cases.On 23 October 2025, the brigade conducted a special operation in Shukrabad, Dhaka, resulting in the arrest of an arms supplier.
