= Power Cell =

- Formation: 1995
- Headquarters: Dhaka, Bangladesh
- Region served: Bangladesh
- Official language: Bengali
- Website: Power Cell

Power Cell (Bengali: পাওয়ার সেল) is a Bangladesh government regulatory agency under the Ministry of Power, Energy and Mineral Resources responsible for regulating the power (electricity) industry in Bangladesh. The Power Cell is responsible for promoting and reforming the power sector. Mohammad Hossain is the Director General of the Power Cell.

== History ==
Power Cell was established in 1995 by the Government of Bangladesh to develop the power sector in Bangladesh. On 11 October 2006, B. D. Rahmatullah was removed from his post of Director General of the Power Cell by the Government of Bangladesh due to his differences with the Prime Minister's Office.
