= Mymensingh Power Station =

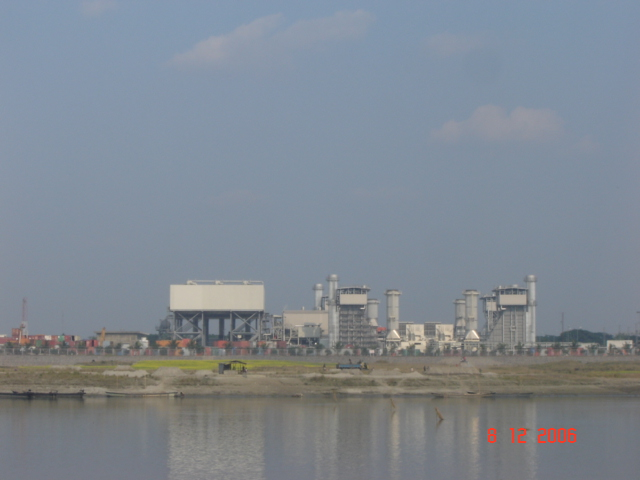
- Official name: Mymensingh 210MW Combined Cycle Power Plant
- Country: Bangladesh
- Location: Shamvuganj, Mymensingh
- Coordinates: 22°35′44″N 89°33′15″E
- Owner: Rural Power Company Limited (Bangladesh)

Thermal power station
- Primary fuel: Gas
- Combined cycle?: Yes

Power generation
- Nameplate capacity: 210 MW

External links
- Commons: Related media on Commons

Mymensingh Power Station (Bengali: ময়মনসিংহ বিদ্যুৎ কেন্দ্র) is a 210-megawatt gas-fired power station in Mymensingh, Bangladesh.

It is powered by Rural Power company limited Bangladesh

== See also ==
1. Rural Electrification Board
2. Rural Power Company Limited
3. Mymensingh Palli Bidyut Samity-1
