= Moin Uddin (general) =

Retired Major General of Bangladesh Army

- মঈন উদ্দিন
- Born: 2 January 1961 (age 65); Daganbhuiyan, East Pakistan, Pakistan
- Alma mater: BUET
- Military career
- Allegiance: Bangladesh
- Branch: Bangladesh Army
- Service years: 1984–2022
- Rank: Major General
- Unit: Corps of Electrical Mechanical Engineers
- Commands: Commandant of 901st Central Workshop; Dean(EECE) of MIST; Chairman of Bangladesh Rural Electrification Board
- Conflicts: UNIKOM; MONUSCO

Moin Uddin (born 2 January 1961) is a retired major general of the Bangladesh Army. He served as the chairman of the Bangladesh Rural Electrification Board.

== Early life ==
Moin Uddin was born on 2 January 1961 in Khushipur village of Daganbhuiyan in Feni. He obtained his BSc degree in electrical and electronic engineering from Bangladesh University of Engineering and Technology in 1984. He is the father of two daughters.

== Career ==
Moin Uddin joined the Bangladesh Army and was commissioned as a lieutenant on 20 December 1984. He held various command, staff, and instructional appointments in the Bangladesh Army. He was the head of the Department of Electrical, Electronic and Communication Engineering (EECE) at the Military Institute of Science and Technology (MIST). He has also served as the dean of MIST. He was promoted to brigadier general on 25 July 2011 and to major general on 29 November 2015. He was appointed as the chairman of the Bangladesh Rural Electrification Board on 24 October 2011 and retired on 5 January 2022.

=== UN peacekeeping mission ===
Moin Uddin served in the UN mission in Iraq-Kuwait from 1994 to 1995 and in the UN peacekeeping mission in Congo in 2005–2006. In 2000, he received the prestigious honor of chief of army staff for his technological innovations.
