= Electricity Generation Company of Bangladesh =

Bangladeshi state-owned utility

- Abbreviation: EGCB
- Formation: 23 November 1996
- Headquarters: Dhaka, Bangladesh
- Region served: Bangladesh
- Official language: Bengali
- Parent organization: Bangladesh Power Development Board (BPDB), Power Division
- Website: EGCB

Electricity Generation Company of Bangladesh (EGCB) is a state owned utility and electricity company located in Dhaka, Bangladesh. It is a subsidiary of Bangladesh Power Development Board.

== History ==
Bangladesh became an independent country in 1971. Since 1972, electricity in Bangladesh had been produced and managed by the Bangladesh Power Development Board under the Ministry of Power, Energy and Mineral Resources. Meghnaghat Power Company Limited was created by the government as part of an effort to create subdivisions of the Bangladesh Power Development Board and divide its responsibilities on 23 November 1996. Meghnaghat Power Company Limited was rebranded on 16 February 2004 as the Electricity Generation Company of Bangladesh. The majority of the shares of the company are held by Bangladesh Power Development Board. The government plans to offload the shares of the company on the stock exchange. It is constructing Siddhirganj power plant in Narayanganj along with Samsung C&T Corporation of South Korea and Isolux Ingenieria SA of Spain. It is one of the most expensive power plants in the world.
