= West Zone Power Distribution Company =

State owned power distribution company at south-western zone in Bangladesh

West Zone Power Distribution Company Limited
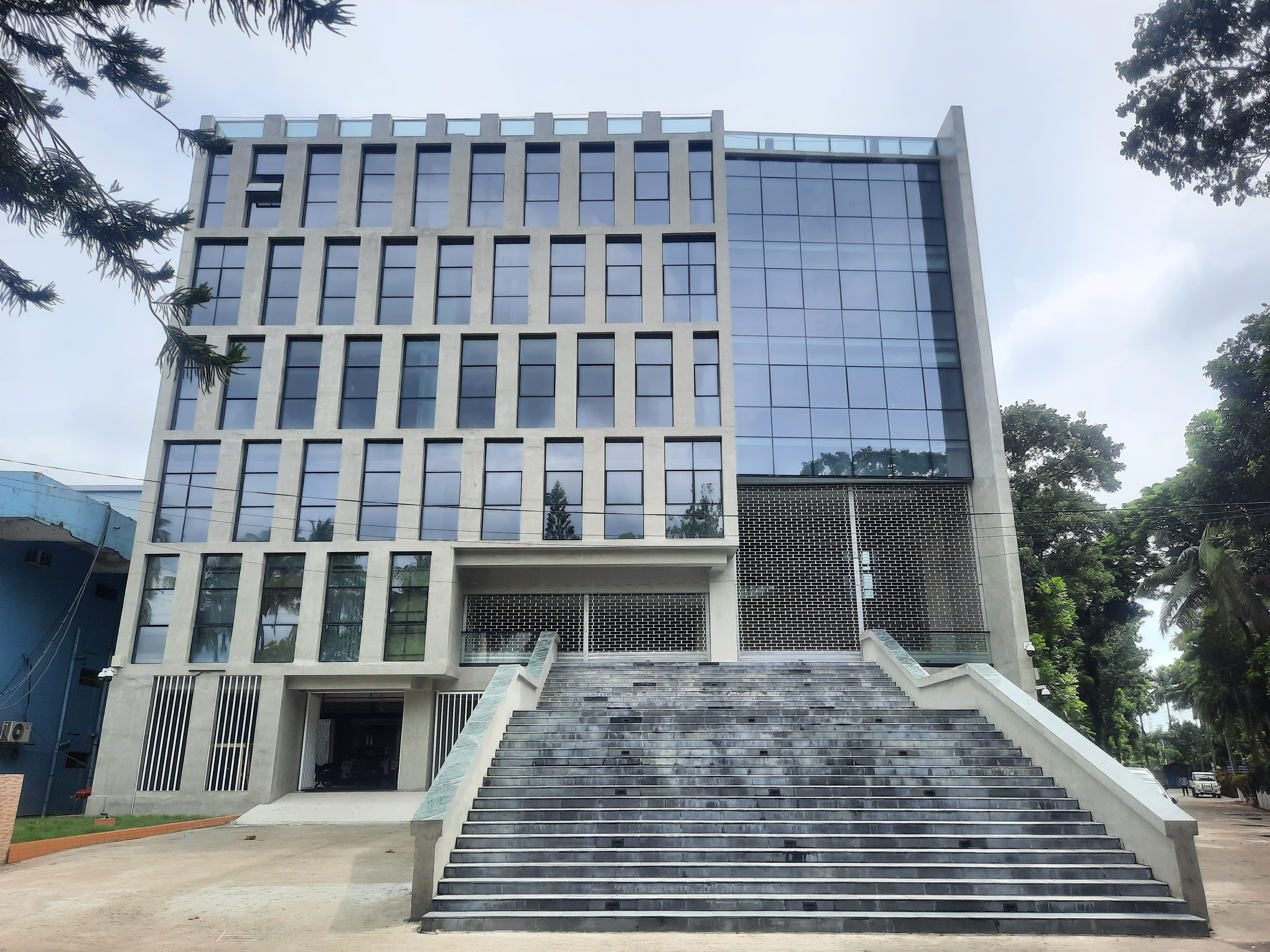
- Nickname: WZPDCL
- Formation: November 2002
- Type: State Owned Company
- Legal status: Active
- Purpose: Quality and Uninterruptible Electricity Supply
- Headquarters: Boyra Main Road, Choto Boyra, Khulna, Bangladesh
- Location: Bangladesh
- Coordinates: 22.827736763587477°N 89.54366082058884°E
- Region served: Cities and Towns of Khulna Division, Barishal Division and Greater Faridpur Region
- Services: Electricity Distribution
- Official language: Bengali
- Managing Director: Engr. A.H.M. Mohiuddin
- Main organ: Board of Directors
- Parent organization: Bangladesh Power Development Board
- Website: www.wzpdcl.gov.bd

West Zone Power Distribution Company Limited (WZPDCL) is a state-owned utility and electricity distribution company located in Khulna, Bangladesh.

== History ==
West Zone Power Distribution Company Limited was established in November 2002. It was founded as a public limited company under the Companies Act, of 1994. The western zone of Bangladesh Power Development Board which included Khulna Division, Barisal Division, and greater Faridpur region (Padma Division) was placed under West Zone Power Distribution Company Limited on 1 October 2003. The company signed Provisional Vendor's Agreement (VA) and Provisional Power Sales Agreement with the Bangladesh Power Development Board on 23 March 2005. The company took over the operations and distributions of the board in the Western zone. Bangladesh Power Development Board employees in the Western Zone joined West Zone Power Distribution Company Limited on 16 December 2007. This restructuring was part of a broader national initiative to corporatize the power sector, separating distribution functions from the generation and transmission roles previously managed directly by the BPDB.

== Service area and infrastructure ==
WZPDCL manages the electrical distribution network across the southwestern region of the country. The company serves consumers across the Khulna, Barishal, and Faridpur regions, operating distribution lines that span thousands of circuit kilometers. A key operational objective of the company is the reduction of technical and non-technical system losses.

== Organizational structure and workforce management ==
=== Operation and Maintenance Department ===
Name of Circle and Sales & Distribution Office
SN	O&M Circle	Sales & Division Office
1	Khulna Circle	Sales & Distribution Division (S&D)-1, Khulna
1	Khulna Circle	Sales & Distribution Division (S&D)-2, Khulna
1	Khulna Circle	Sales & Distribution Division (S&D)-3, Khulna
1	Khulna Circle	Sales & Distribution Division (S&D)-4, Khulna
1	Khulna Circle	Sales & Distribution Division (S&D), Bagerhat
1	Khulna Circle	Mongla Electric Supply, Mongla, Bagerhat
1	Khulna Circle	Fultala Electric Supply, Fultala, Khulna
2	Barishal Circle	Sales & Distribution Division (S&D)-1, Barisal
2	Barishal Circle	Sales & Distribution Division (S&D)-2, Barisal
2	Barishal Circle	Pirojpur Electric Supply, Pirojpur
2	Barishal Circle	Jhalakhati Electric Supply, Jhalakhati
2	Barishal Circle	Bhandaria Electric Supply, Pirojpur
2	Barishal Circle	Kathalia Electric Supply, Kathalia, Jhalakathi
2	Barishal Circle	Nalcity Electric Supply, Nalcity, Jhalakathi
3	Kushtia Circle	Sales & Distribution Division (S&D)-1, Kushtia
3	Kushtia Circle	Sales & Distribution Division (S&D)-2, Kushtia
3	Kushtia Circle	Sales & Distribution Division (S&D), Jhenaidah
3	Kushtia Circle	Sales & Distribution Division (S&D), Chuadanga
3	Kushtia Circle	Meherpur Electric Supply, Meherpur
3	Kushtia Circle	Kaligonj Electric Supply, Kaligonj, Jhenaidah
3	Kushtia Circle	Bheramara Electric Supply, Bheramara, Kushtia
3	Kushtia Circle	Kotcandpur Electric Supply, Kotcandpur, Jhenaidah
3	Kushtia Circle	Alamdanga Electric Supply, Alamdanga, Chuadanga
3	Kushtia Circle	Shailkopa Electric Supply, Shailkopa, Jhenaidah
3	Kushtia Circle	Kumarkhali Electric Supply, Kumarkhali, Kushtia
3	Kushtia Circle	Moheshpur Electric Supply, Moheshpur, Jhenaidah
4	Faridpur Circle	Sales & Distribution Division (S&D)-1, Faridpur
4	Faridpur Circle	Sales & Distribution Division (S&D)-2, Faridpur
4	Faridpur Circle	Rajbari Electric Supply, Rajbari
4	Faridpur Circle	Sales & Distribution Division (S&D), Madaripur
4	Faridpur Circle	Gopalgonj Electric Supply, Gopalgonj
4	Faridpur Circle	Shariatpur Electric Supply, Shariatpur
4	Faridpur Circle	Bhanga Electric Supply, Bhanga, Faridpur
4	Faridpur Circle	Modhukhali Electric Supply, Modhukhali, Faridpur
4	Faridpur Circle	Pangsha Electric Supply, Pangsha, Rajbari
4	Faridpur Circle	Goalonda Electric Supply, Goalonda, Rajbari
4	Faridpur Circle	Sadarpur Electric Supply, Sadarpur, Faridpur
5	Jashore Circle	Sales & Distribution Division (S&D)-1, Jashore
5	Jashore Circle	Sales & Distribution Division (S&D)-2, Jashore
5	Jashore Circle	Satkhira Electric Supply, Satkhira
5	Jashore Circle	Magura Electric Supply, Magura
5	Jashore Circle	Narail Electric Supply, Narail
6	Patuakhali Circle	Sales & Distribution Division (S&D), Patuakhali
6	Patuakhali Circle	Bhola Electric Supply, Bhola
6	Patuakhali Circle	Barguna Electric Supply, Barguna
6	Patuakhali Circle	Charfession Electric Supply, Charfession, Bhola
6	Patuakhali Circle	Borhanuddin Electric Supply, Borhanuddin, Bhola
6	Patuakhali Circle	Monpura Electric Supply, Monpura, Bhola

=== ICT Division ===
Advances in information and communication technology (ICT) have made knowledge, information, inventions, methodologies, techniques, processes and technologies from around the world accessible through the internet. With the introduction of the government's Digital Bangladesh initiative as a major policy priority, e-government received renewed attention. E-governance refers to the use of ICT to deliver government services, facilitate the exchange of information and communication, and integrate independent systems and services across government-to-citizen (G2C), government-to-business (G2B) and government-to-government (G2G) interactions, as well as back-office processes within the government.

Development of ICT is closely associated with 'bringing government services to the 'citizen's door steps'. This is the main essence of designing ICT development in WZPDCL.

==== Major ICT-related activities ====
- Enterprise Resource Planning (ERP)
- Bill on Web for Customer Service
- Integrated Online Payment Gateway & Mobile Financial Service
- Pre-payment Metering System
- Online New Connection Software
- Online Recruitment System
- Web Based Store Management Software
- Customer Service through Call Center (16117)
- Customer Service through Android App
- Shutdown Management System
- Web Portal updating and monitoring
- E-tendering System through e-GP
- E-filing System
- Network, Hardware And Cyber Security-Related Activities
- Digital Attendance System
- Close Circuit Camera for Monitoring
- Domain Mail System
- Training Management Software
- Disaster Recovery Center (DRC)
- GIS and SCADA
- Video Conferencing System Amongst WZPDCL and Other Entities of The Power Sector
- Innovation Showcasing
- Social Media Activities (Facebook, Twitter, YouTube, Instagram, LinkedIn)
- Innovation, Modernization and other responsibilities to the related field.

== Modernization initiatives ==
The company has faced challenges in modernizing its billing infrastructure. A 2017 report highlighted delays in the rollout of prepaid smart meters in the Khulna region, despite national directives aimed at reducing revenue leakage. Efforts to integrate SCADA systems for grid automation have been cited as part of the company's long-term infrastructure development plans.
