= Northwest Power Generation Company =

Power and electric company

North-West Power Generation Company Limited (NWPGCL)
- Abbreviation: NWPGCL
- Formation: 28 August 2007
- Type: Govt. undertaking
- Headquarters: Dhaka, Bangladesh
- Region served: Bangladesh
- Official language: Bengali, English
- Parent organization: Bangladesh Power Development Board (BPDB), Power Division
- Website: https://www.nwpgcl.gov.bd

North-West Power Generation Company Limited (NWPGCL) is a state-owned power and electric company located in UTC Building (Level 3 & 4), 8 Panthapath, Kawranbazar, Dhaka, Bangladesh. It is an enterprise of the Bangladesh Power Development Board (BPDB).

== History ==
North-West Power Generation Company Limited (NWPGCL) was established on 28 August 2007 as a Public Limited Company under the Bangladesh Power Development Board. Bangladesh-China Power Company (Pvt.) Ltd (BCPCL) a joint venture between China National Machinery Import and Export Corporation (CMC) and North-West Power Generation Company Limited (NWPGCL) built a 1,320 MW power plant in Patuakhali District near Payra Seaport. Bangladesh-China Power Company (Pvt.) Ltd (BCPCL) was formed in 2014. NWPGCL has four power plants in Sirajganj, Bheramara, Kushtia, Bagerhat and Khulna. Northwest Power Generation Company Limited has joint ventures with Siemens to build a 4 billion dollar power plant. It has joint venture with Sembcorp Utilities of Singapore to build a 414-megawatt power plant in Sirajganj. It also has joint collaboration with the Japanese Marubeni.
