= Rooppur Nuclear Power Plant =

Nuclear power station in Rajshahi, Bangladesh

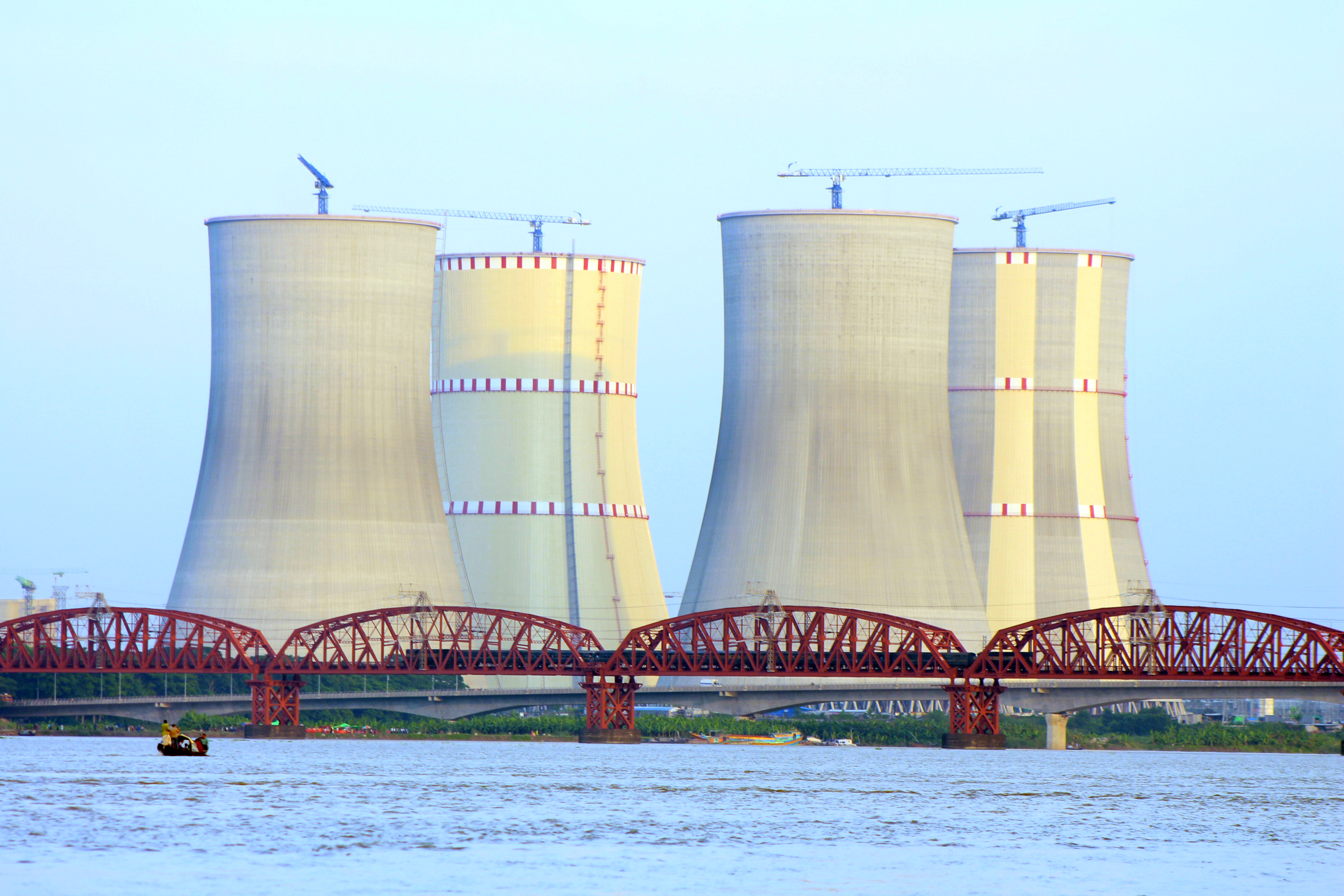
- Wide angle view of Rooppur Nuclear Power Plant
- Country: Bangladesh
- Location: Ishwardi Upazila, Pabna District, Rajshahi Division, Bangladesh
- Coordinates: 24°4′0″N 89°2′50″E
- Status: Under construction
- Commission date: 2025
- Construction cost: $12.65 billion (estimated); cumulative expenditure BDT 73,746.06 crore (as of June 2024).
- Owner: Bangladesh Atomic Energy Commission
- Operator: Nuclear Power Plant Company Bangladesh Limited

Nuclear power station
- Reactor type: PWR
- Reactor supplier: Atomstroyexport
- Cooling towers: 4 × Natural Draft
- Cooling source: Padma River
- Thermal capacity: 2 × 3,200 MW_{th}

Power generation
- Make and model: VVER-1200/523
- Units under const.: 2 × 1,200 MW (gross)
- Nameplate capacity: 2,160 MW

External links
- Website: www.rooppurnpp.gov.bd
- Commons: Related media on Commons

The Rooppur Nuclear Power Plant (Bengali: রূপপুর পারমাণবিক বিদ্যুৎ কেন্দ্র) is a 2.4 GW_{e} nuclear power plant in Bangladesh. It consists of two 1200 MWe VVER-1200 reactors. The nuclear power plant is located at Rooppur in Ishwardi Upazila on the bank of the river Padma, about 160 km northwest of Dhaka. It is the country's first nuclear power plant, and the first of the two units is expected to become operational in 2026. Unit 1 achieved criticality in October 2026.

Safety review by the IAEA was successfully completed in late 2025.

== History ==
=== Planning ===
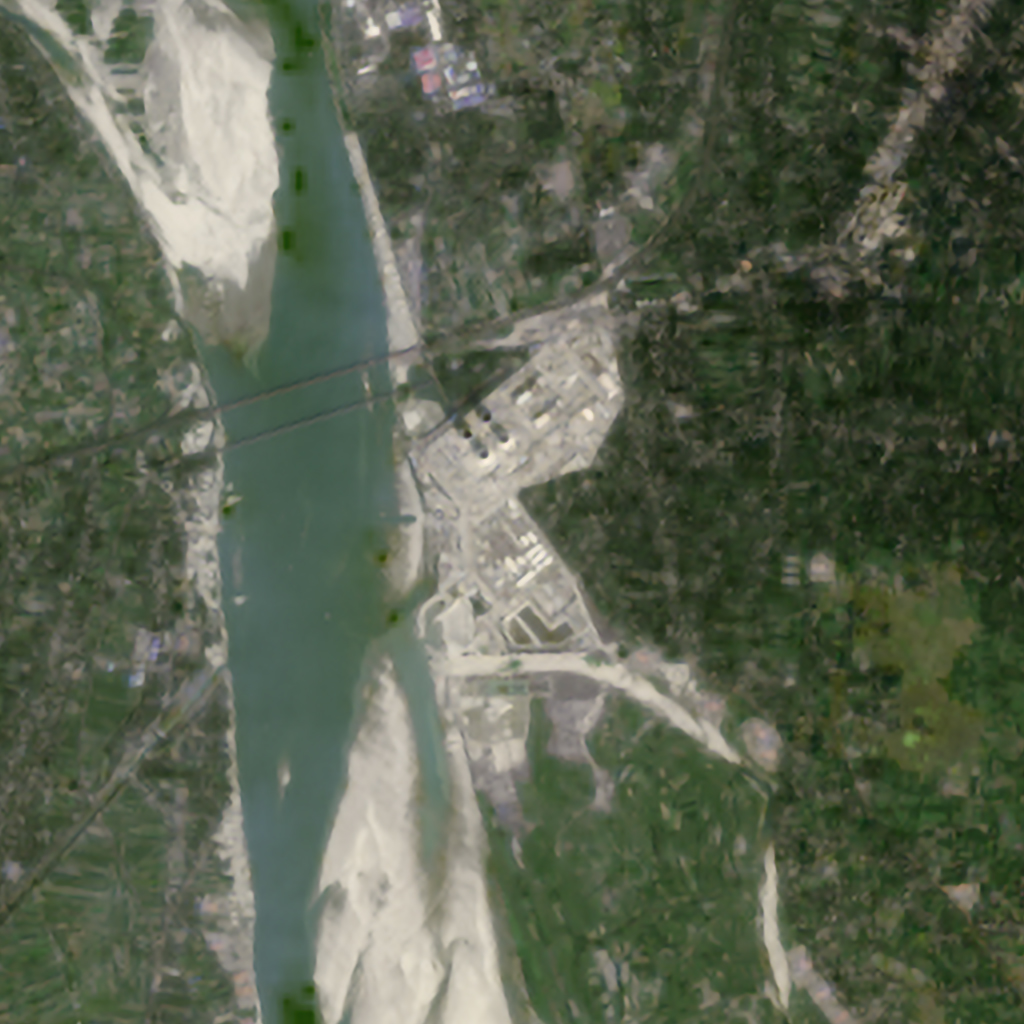
Satellite image of the power plant and surrounding area in January 2024

The plan to establish a nuclear power plant in the then East Pakistan was made in 1961. In 1963, the Rooppur village of the Pabna district was selected for the proposed plant and 260 acres of land was acquired. The plan was to establish a 200MW nuclear power plant on the selected site. The plan to construct a 200 MW power plant was completed in 1969 with the assistance of Belgium and the Government of Pakistan.

After Bangladesh separated from Pakistan, the government of Bangladesh resumed the effort to construct the 200-megawatt nuclear power plant. From 1977–86, the French company MS Sofratom carried out a feasibility study and determined that the Rooppur project was viable. Subsequently, the Executive Committee of the National Economic Council (ECNEC) approved a 125 MW nuclear power plant. However, the project did not materialize. In 1987–88, another feasibility study was conducted by Lahmeyer International and Motor Columbus which again proved that the site was technically, economically, and financially viable for a 300–500 MW nuclear power plant. Between 1997 and 2001, the Bangladesh Atomic Energy Commission (BAEC) embarked on a new initiative to develop a nuclear power plant with a capacity of 600 MW.

In 2005, Bangladesh signed a nuclear cooperation agreement with China. Two years later, in 2007, the Bangladesh Atomic Energy Commission (BAEC) put forth a proposal for the construction of two 500 MW nuclear reactors in Rooppur, aiming for completion by 2015.

In 2008, the Bangladeshi government reaffirmed its commitment to collaborate with China on the construction of the Rooppur Nuclear Power Plant, with China extending an offer of financial support for the project. A year later, on 13 May 2009, BAEC signed a memorandum of understanding (MoU) with Russia's Rosatom on "Cooperation in Using Nuclear Energy for Peaceful Purpose". Then, on 21 May 2010, Bangladesh and the Russia signed a framework agreement on "Cooperation in Using Nuclear Energy for Peaceful Purpose".

On 10 November 2010, the Parliament of Bangladesh made the decision to proceed with the immediate implementation of a nuclear power project.

In 2011, International Atomic Energy Agency conducted IAEA Integrated Nuclear Infrastructure Review (INIR) mission in Bangladesh to understand the state of Bangladesh's nuclear infrastructure. Later the same year, the IAEA examined and offered suggestions for the national nuclear power infrastructure.

On 15 January 2013, Bangladesh and Russia established an Intergovernmental Credit Agreement worth US$500 million to fund the preparatory phase activities of the power plant, and construction of the first phase of the project was also approved on 2 April of the same year.

On 27 June 2013, the Bangladesh Atomic Energy Commission (BAEC) and Atomstroyexport signed the first contract, which covered the Feasibility Studies, Engineering Survey, and Environmental Impact Assessment. On 2 October of the same year, a second contract was signed between the same two entities for the development of design documentation, which included first priority working documentation and necessary engineering surveys. Subsequently, a third contract was signed on 5 June 2014, concerning the "Performance of First Priority Works for the Preparatory Stage of Rooppur NPP Construction".

In 2015, Rosatom offered to build two units featuring VVER-1200 reactors which increased the total output to 2400 MW, up from the initial offer of two VVER-1000 reactors with a total capacity of 2000 MW made in 2010.

=== General contract ===
On 25 December 2015, representatives of the Bangladesh Atomic Energy Commission and the Russian state nuclear corporation Rosatom signed the general contract for Rooppur nuclear power plant worth US$12.65 billion.

The general contract for the construction of two units is an EPC (Engineering, Procurement, and Construction) contract and it includes construction, installation, erection work, the development of working documentation, the supply of equipment and materials, nuclear fuel for initial loading and two reloads, personnel training, and commissioning. Since the contract adopts a Whole Plant Contract Price model, prices are not calculated separately for individual tasks such as construction or commissioning.

The contract also includes the delivery of nuclear fuel from Russia as part of the construction work until 2027. This differs from the contract awarded to Rosatom for the Kudankulam Nuclear Power Plant, which was limited to Engineering and Procurement (EP), with the Indian side responsible for construction and commissioning.

Following this development, three days later, The Daily Star echoed criticism from Germany-based Transparency International about increased costs, from statements of around US$4 billion made earlier in the same year.

=== Technology selection ===
The Bangladesh Atomic Energy Commission (BAEC) considered building a power plant using VVER-1000 technology or equivalent from other suppliers in 2007, estimating costs between $0.9 billion and $2 billion. By 2009, Russia proposed constructing two units using AES-92 technology, which the government of Bangladesh responded to favorably.

In October 2013, Valery Limarenko, president of the United Company NIAEP-Atomstroyexport, said that he expected the Rooppur Nuclear Project to be based on a modified AES-2006 design. This was followed in 2014 by Moscow Atomenergoprom's confirmation that it would deliver two units based on the AES-2006 design, with Novovoronezh II designated as the reference plant for the project.

As discussions progressed, several Bangladeshi media outlets reported in 2015 that Russia was seeking to supply VVER-TOI reactors. However, in September 2013, Marat Mustasin, general director of Atomenergoproekt, clarified in an interview with Nuclear.Ru that although the geological survey at Rooppur would be conducted under the VVER-TOI project, a decision on which specific reactor design the plant would be adjusted to would be made later.

=== Construction ===
On 4 November 2017, the Bangladesh Atomic Energy Commission received, from the Bangladesh Atomic Energy Regulatory Authority, the design and construction license of Unit 1, paving the way for the nuclear island first concrete pour.

The nuclear reactor and critical infrastructure are being built by Russian companies. Atomenergomash is the engineering division of Russia's state nuclear corporation, Rosatom. This company is the supplier of all the equipment for the reactor compartment of Rooppur Nuclear Power Plant and a significant part of the equipment for the machine room.

On 14 July 2018, the first concrete was poured for Unit 2. The following month, Rosatom began installing a 200-tonne core catcher as the first large piece of equipment in the reactor building of Rooppur 1, describing it as "a unique protection system".

When the COVID-19 pandemic struck Bangladesh in early 2020, many projects such as the Dhaka Metro Rail were stalled, but the Rooppur Nuclear Power Plant remained on track to be completed by 2023 or 2024. Progress in this period included Rosatom's engineering company Atommash completing hydraulic tests for Rooppur unit 1. Russia's invasion of Ukraine in 2022, however, meant international sanctions and restrictions on movement of Russian capital and personnel. By 2022, Russia claimed its work on the plant was unaffected.

Concrete work for Unit 2 was completed in January 2024.

On 18 December 2018, Rosatom announced that its Engineering Division had successfully completed the construction and installation work at Unit 1 of the Rooppur Nuclear Power Plant.

=== Commissioning ===
On 17 September 2024, the loading of Dummy Fuel Assemblies (DFAs) into the core of Unit 1 started in order to validate reactor hydraulic parameters during circulation flushing, as well as during reactor hot and cold tests. Nuclear fuel was loaded into Unit 1 in May 2026 and it achieved criticality on 11 October 2026. Power startup is planned for 20 November.

In October 2026, the nuclear fuel for Unit 2 was delivered.

==== Expansion ====
In 2024, the Prime Minister at the time, Sheikh Hasina, requested that Rosatom build two additional units upon completion of the first two units.

== Safety ==
The safety of VVER-1200/523 units of the power plant is ensured by emergency core cooling systems, reactor shutdown systems, and heat removal systems. Some of these safety systems are active, while others are passive. All these systems have 2 to 4 times redundancy.

The emergency core cooling system of the VVER-1200/523 consists of active and passive systems. Two of the active safety systems that ensure cooling are high pressure injection system (HPIS), and low pressure injection system (LPIS). Both these systems have two independent trains with 100% redundancy. Another active system that ensures cooling is the Emergency and Planned Cooldown System, which comprises the HPIS, LPIS, and the Spent Fuel Pool Cooling System.

In contrast, passive cooling of the core is ensured by the four first and eight second stage hydro-accumulator tanks, which are filled with a boric acid solution. Each hydro accumulator tank in the first stage has a capacity of 60 m^{3}, while each tank in the second stage has a capacity of 120 m^{3}. These tanks are designed to automatically inject boric acid solution into the core when the pressure in the Reactor Coolant System falls below a specified threshold.

In addition to the safety systems for injecting coolant into the core, there are also systems used for removing heat from the core. One of these systems is the Steam Generator Emergency Cooldown System. It is an entirely closed-loop system. Each train of this system is connected to two steam generators. When the pressure in the steam generator reaches a specific threshold, the valve on the steam lines that lead to the heat exchanger open automatically, allowing the steam to be condensed back into water, after which the water is sent back to the steam generator.

Furthermore, the VVER-1200/523 is equipped with a Passive Heat Removal System (PHRS) designed to remove decay heat from the core during a Station Blackout (SBO). This system features four independent trains, each containing two air-cooled heat exchangers. When activated during a loss of AC power, the bypass line of the steam generator opens, directing steam to the air-cooled heat exchangers, which uses atmospheric air to condense the steam and return it to the steam generators. This system requires that 3 out of 4 trains remain operational to ensure effective cooldown and can function indefinitely.

The VVER-1200/523 is also equipped with a redundant shutdown system that consists of control rods made of boron carbide and Emergency Boron Injection System (EBIS).

In addition to the safety systems for the primary and secondary circuits, the double containment also is equipped with its own safety features designed to prevent radiation release and protect against external events. Among these systems are the Containment Spray System (CSS), Passive Autocatalytic Recombiners (PAR), and the Core Catcher (CC).

The Containment Spray System (CSS) lowers pressure and temperature within the containment during a Loss of Coolant Accident (LOCA). The Passive Autocatalytic Recombiners (PAR) remove hydrogen produced from fuel rods during a LOCA by mixing it with oxygen and producing water through a catalytic reaction. The Core Catcher (CC) retains the materials of the molten core, ensures its cooling, and maintains its subcriticality in the event of a meltdown.

== Waste ==
=== Spent fuel repatriation ===
The governments of Bangladesh and Russia formalized an inter governmental agreement (IGA) on 30 August 2017, concerning the repatriation of spent nuclear fuel generated by the Rooppur Nuclear Power Plant to Russia. This agreement stipulates the return of the spent nuclear fuel to Russia for purposes of temporary storage, reprocessing, recycling, and the management of the resultant products derived from the reprocessing process.

=== Liquid radioactive waste management ===
In July 2022, a contract was signed between the general contractor of Rooppur Nuclear Power Plant, Atomstroyexport, and Sverdniikhimmash, a subsidiary of AtomEnergoMash, for the design, manufacture, and supply of equipment for the management of liquid radioactive waste at the Rooppur Nuclear Power Plant.

== Economics ==
=== Cost and funding ===
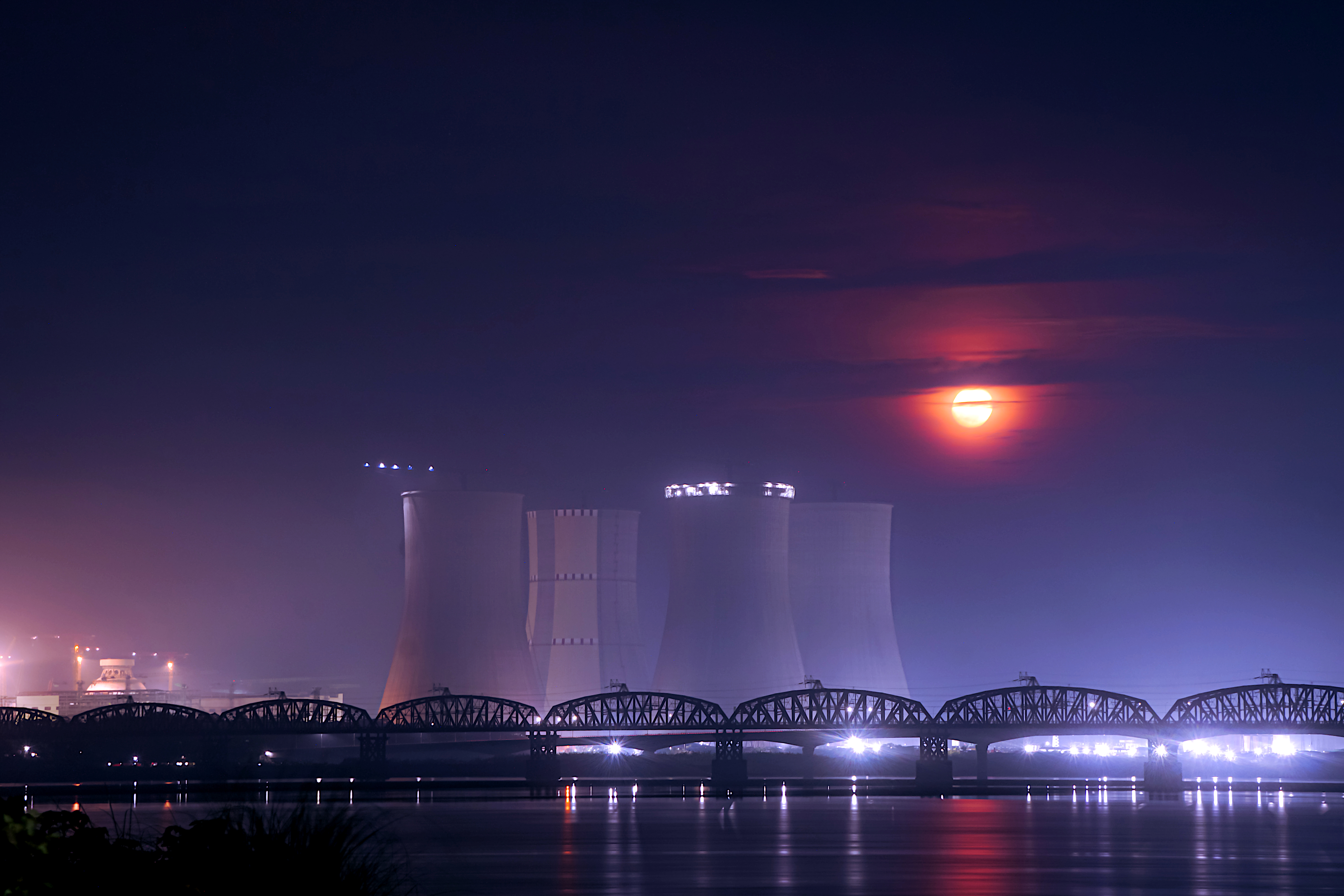
Rooppur Nuclear Power Plant at night

The project, which is estimated to cost $12.65 billion, is being financed mainly through Russian export credit amounting to $11.38 billion. The interest rate for the Russian loan is set at the 6-month LIBOR rate plus 1.75%, with a maximum limit of 4% per year. However, SOFR took the place of LIBOR in June 2023.

The Russian export credit had a 7-year utilization period from 2017 to 2024, with a 10-year grace period and 20-year repayment period. However, during a meeting on February 26, 2025, between Chief Advisor Muhammad Yunus and Rosatom Director General Alexey Likhachev, the utilization period was extended until the end of 2026.

The repayment structure was designed to consist of 40 equal biannual installments distributed over a period of 20 years initially. In contrast, under the revised arrangement, Bangladesh will fulfill its principal repayment obligation through 38 installments, with payments scheduled for March 15 and September 15 annually.

According to the Planning Division's Revised Annual Development Programme for 2024-2025, as of June 2024, BDT 73,746.06 crore has been spent on the project.

Additionally, the Economic Relations Division's Annual Report 2024-2025 reports that a total of $7.98 billion had been disbursed to Bangladesh by Russia as of the fiscal year 2024-25. The Russian Embassy in Dhaka stated that only the amounts of state export credits that have been used are the debt that the foreign state borrower owes to Russia.

=== Levelized cost of electricity (LCOE) ===
A report from the government of Bangladesh estimated the levelized cost of electricity (LCOE) at $56.73/MWh. However, a research paper published in 2020 found the LCOE to be between $43.8/MWh and $82.5/MWh, using the Financial Analysis of Electric Sector Expansion Plans (FINPLAN) for nine different postulated scenarios.

== Planned nuclear power reactors ==
Unit	Type	Capacity (gross)	Construction started	Grid connection	Commercial operation	References
Rooppur 1	VVER-1200/523	1200 MWe	30 Nov 2017	17 Nov 2026	2026	
Rooppur 2	VVER-1200/523	1200 MWe	14 Jul 2018		2026	

== Economic justification ==
Reducing dependence on electricity generated from oil and gas is crucial for Bangladesh due to the depletion of these resources and their adverse effects on the environment. Experts believe that the Rooppur Nuclear Power Plant will play a crucial role in ensuring energy security and reducing CO_{2} emissions at a low cost.

Additionally, a research article published in 2020 indicates that the levelized cost of electricity (LCOE) of the Rooppur NPP is competitive with those of coal, oil, and renewable energy sources. The research article also points out that the LCOE of the Rooppur NPP is currently higher than that of gas-based power plants in Bangladesh. However, this situation may change as the country becomes more reliant on liquefied natural gas (LNG) imported from the international market.

== Corruption ==
=== Rooppur Pillow Scandal ===
The Rooppur pillow scandal involved corruption by engineers tasked with furnishing 966 flats for plant workers. This included inflated prices for some domestic products, such as pillows that were priced at BDT 90,000 each, according to the Office of the Comptroller and Auditor General (CAG). The CAG office reported that approximately BDT 2.95 billion had been misappropriated through irregularities associated with construction of 20 buildings for Rooppur Green City.

=== Allegations of embezzlement ===
On 17 August 2024, Global Defense Corp alleged that former prime minister Sheikh Hasina and her family members embezzled over $5 billion in kickbacks for the purchase of two VVER-1200 reactors from Rosatom. However, the website did not provide any sources to support this claim. According to The Bangla Outlook, the website neither provided any sources nor reference any documents to support its claims.

In response to allegations of embezzlement, the Russian Embassy in Dhaka issued a press release on 11 September 2024, clarifying that as of 3 September 2024, approximately US$7.3 billion of the US$11.38 billion export credit (set to expire on 31 December 2024) and US$491.3 million out of the US$500 million export credit (which expired in 2017) provided by Russia for the Rooppur Nuclear Power Plant project in Bangladesh has been utilized, and only the utilized portions of state export credits are deemed as the debt of the foreign state borrower.

The press release further stated that the absence of any corruption on the Rooppur Nuclear Power Project can be proven by the fact that Russian law does not allow direct transfer of funds of export credits to the sovereign borrower.

==== Investigation into allegations of embezzlement ====
On 3 September 2024, the chairman of the National Democratic Movement, Bobby Hajjaj, submitted a petition to the High Court asking the Anti-Corruption Commission (ACC) to investigate allegations of $5 billion in embezzlement from the Rooppur Nuclear Power Plant Project by Sheikh Hasina and her family members.

Following this, on 17 December 2024, the ACC announced to reporters that it had initiated an investigation against Sheikh Hasina and her family members, including British MP Tulip Siddiq, regarding allegations of embezzlement amounting to Tk80,000 crore, which includes more than $5 billion (Tk59,000 crore) from the Rooppur Nuclear Power Plant Project.

The Daily Telegraph reported on February 4, 2025, that the ACC received claims indicating that a luxury flat in London, now valued at £700,000, that had been given to Tulip Siddiq was allegedly purchased with embezzled funds from the Rooppur Nuclear Power Plant project. However, Labour sources clarified that the flat, gifted to Tulip Siddiq by a businessman associated with her aunt, Sheikh Hasina, had been given to her in 2004, suggesting it is not related to the nuclear agreement signed in 2013.

== Criticism ==
Many experts have expressed concerns over the high cost of Rooppur Nuclear Power Plant, arguing that it costs higher than similar projects worldwide. However, officials say that the cost of Rooppur is consistent with costs for VVER-1200 projects worldwide. Similar projects include two units in Hungary, estimated at around $13.2 billion, four units in Egypt at around $30 billion, four units in Turkey at around $20 billion and two units in Belarus at around $11 billion.

Moreover, a research paper published in 2020 suggests that the Levelized Cost of Electricity (LCOE) for the Rooppur Nuclear Power Plant is expected to be lower than the global average of US 9.59 cents/kWh. The research paper also indicates that the LCOE for Rooppur Nuclear Plant is estimated at US 9.48 cents/kWh, which is similar to the Ostrovets Nuclear Power Plant in Belarus at US 8.03 cents/kWh and the Paks II Nuclear Power Plant under construction in Hungary at US 8.56 cents/kWh, as calculated using the INPRO model. All three projects utilize two VVER-1200 reactors with similar electrical power output.

== See also ==
- Nuclear energy in Bangladesh
- Mymensingh Power Station
- List of megaprojects in Bangladesh
