= Electricity sector in Bangladesh =

Electricity sector of Bangladesh
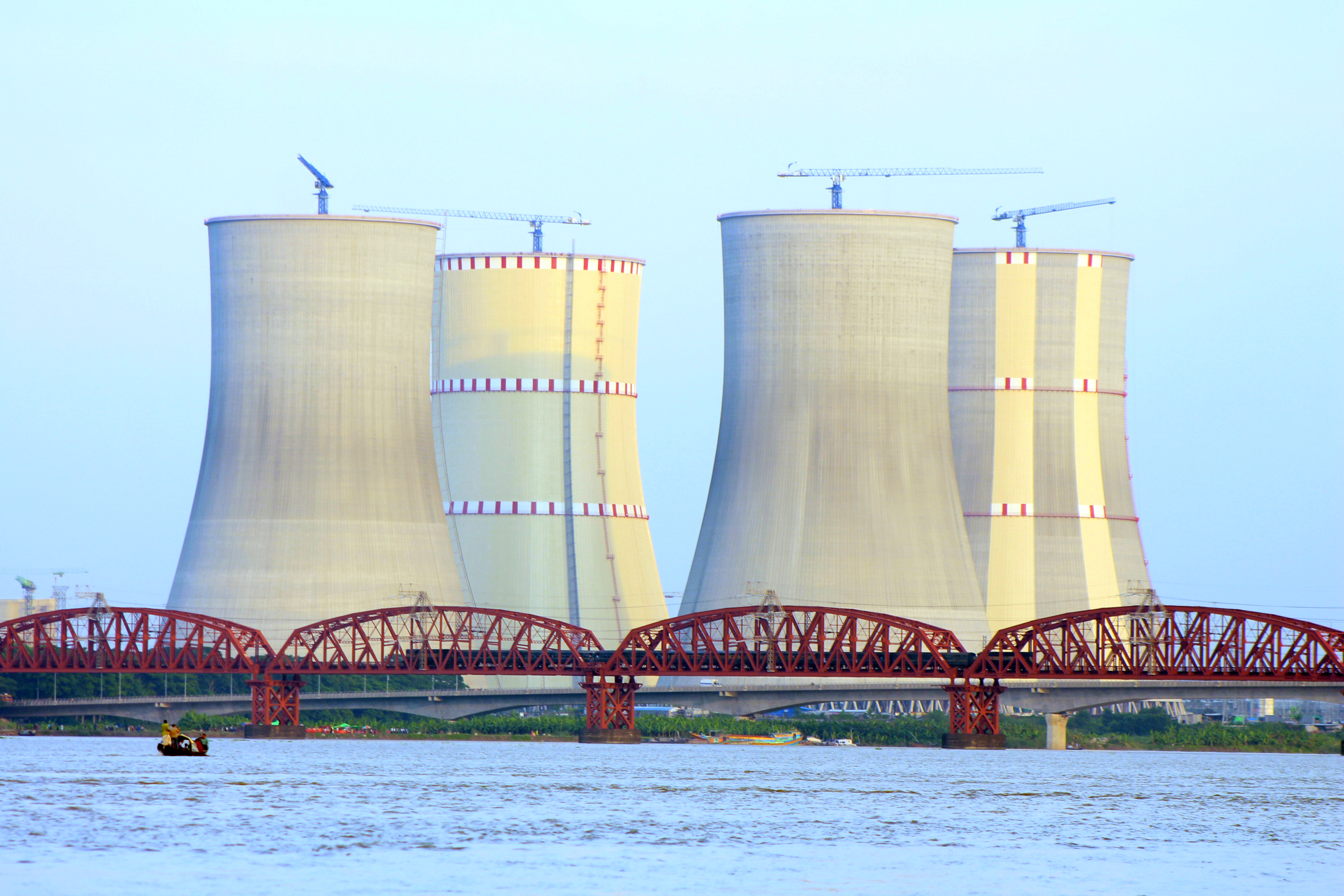
- Rooppur Nuclear Power Plant, Rooppur, Pabna

Data
- Electricity coverage: 99.5% (2023)
- Installed capacity: 25,700 MW
- Production: 80.4 TWh FY21

Consumption by sector (% of total)
- Residential: 56.42% FY21
- Industrial: 28.40% FY21
- Agriculture: 2.43% FY21
- Commercial and public sector: 12.74% FY21

Tariffs and financing
- Share of government financing (2022): 56%
- Share of private financing (2022): 44%

Institutions
- Responsibility for transmission: Power Grid Company of Bangladesh
- Responsibility for policy-setting: Ministry of Power, Energy and Mineral Resources Bangladesh Power Development Board
- Electricity sector law: Energy Regulatory Commission Act

The electricity sector in Bangladesh operates using a single national grid, managed by the state-owned Power Grid Company of Bangladesh (PGCB), with an installed capacity of 25,700 MW as of June 2022. Bangladesh's energy sector is not up to the mark. However, per capita energy consumption in Bangladesh is considered higher than the production. Electricity was introduced to the country on 7 December 1901.

Electricity is the major source of power for most of the country's economic activities. Bangladesh's total installed electricity generation capacity (including captive power) is 27,840 MW, while the maximum production ever attained was 16,477 MW. It was 15,351 megawatts (MW) as of January 2017 and 20,000 megawatts in 2018.

The largest energy consumers in Bangladesh are industries and the residential sector, followed by the commercial and agricultural sectors.

Bangladesh will need an estimated 34,000 MW of power by 2030 to sustain its economic growth of over 7 percent.

Problems in Bangladesh's electric power sector include high system losses, delays in completion of new plants, low plant efficiency, erratic power supply, electricity theft, blackouts, and shortages of funds for power plant maintenance. Overall, the country's generation plants have been unable to meet system demand over the past decade.

On the 2nd of November, 2014, electricity was restored after a day-long nationwide blackout. A transmission line from India had failed, which "led to a cascade of failures throughout the national power grid," and criticism of "old grid infrastructure and poor management." However, in a recent root-cause analysis report the investigating team has clarified that the fault was actually due to internal lack of coordination and poor health of transmission and distribution infrastructure that caused the blackout.

On 4 October 2022, 70–80% of the country's 168 million residence were hit with blackouts and only 45% of residences were restored with power by nightfall. There was a shortage of natural gas because of the 2021–present global energy crisis where 77 natural gas power plants had insufficient fuel to meet demand. The electricity sector in Bangladesh is heavily reliant on natural gas. The government stopped buying spot price liquefied natural gas in June 2022; they were importing 30% of their LNG on the spot market this year down from 40% last year. They are still importing LNG on futures exchange markets.

== Sources of energy ==
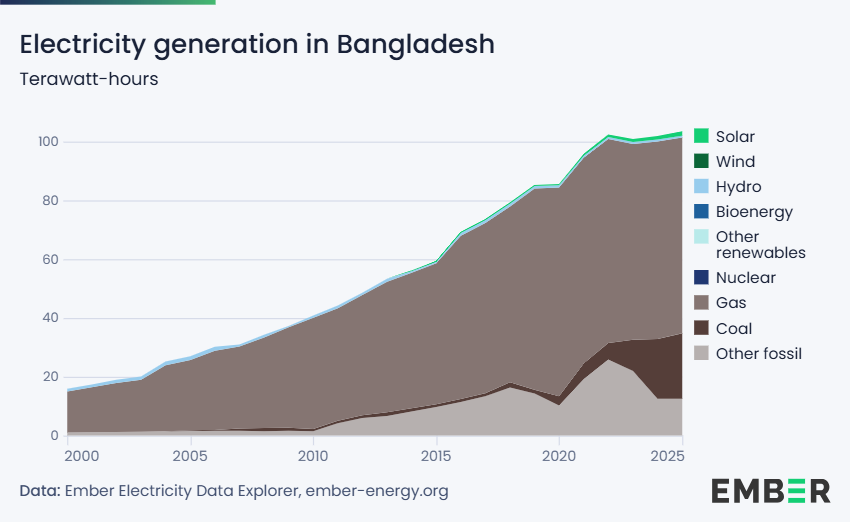
Electricity generation in Bangladesh in terawatt-hours

Efforts to develop an open-pit coal mine in Phulbari, Dinajpur District, have met with large, violent protests in 2006 because of feared environmental effects, and six people were killed and hundreds injured. At the time, the government closed the project, for which it was working with Asia Energy (now Global Coal Resources). It was encouraged in December 2009 to re-open it by the United States ambassador in private communication. In October 2010 protesters make a week-long march from Phulbari to Dhaka against the mine; a coalition of other groups protested at a Global Coal Resources meeting in London.

== Renewable energy ==
Bangladesh electricity production

According to the Bangladesh's Power Sector Master Plan 2016 (PSMP–2016), the country has the potential to generate a combined 3.6 GW of electricity from renewable energy sources. Another research has estimated that the potential from wind power alone stands at 20 GW.

The government of Bangladesh has approved the construction by private developers of 19 on-grid solar parks, with would have cumulative generation capacity of 1070 MW.

Bangladesh has planned to produce 10% of total power generation by 2020 from renewable energy sources like wind, waste, and solar energy. The country plans to increase its renewable energy share to 17% by 2041 under its Intended Nationally Determined Contribution (INDC) commitment to reduce greenhouse gas emissions by 5% until 2030.

The country's prospect of geothermal energy extraction has also been discussed by researchers. Studies carried out by geologists suggested geothermal resources in northwest and southeast region.

== Recent plans ==
Total electricity supply 2022
1. Natural gas (67.7%)
2. Oil (25.2%)
3. Coal (5.50%)
4. Solar, Wind, Hydro, etc. (1.60%)

The government has prepared a Power System Master Plan (PSMP) including the reform activities to meet the growing demand. As per the plan, power generation capacity will be 40 GW by 2030 and 60 GW by 2041. To secure fuel supply, the government has planned for fuel diversification. Electricity generation from gas/LNG, liquid fuel, coal, nuclear, hydro, renewable and import from neighbouring countries have also been included in this plan. As per this plan, coal, nuclear, and gas/LNG-based combined cycle power plants will be used as base load power plants. Imported LNG will be used as complementary as local gas is limited. The integrated power and energy master plan is in the final stage in line with the upgradation of PSMP.

Power Sector Generation plan
Description	Feb 2023	2030	2041
Installed capacity (MW)	26,700*	40,000	60,000
Electricity demand (MW)	15,500	33,000	52,000
Transmission line (circuit km)	14,546	27,300	34,850
Grid substation capacity (MVA)	58,076	120,000	261,000
Per capita power generation (kWh)	609	815	1475
Access to Electricity (%)	100%	100%	100%

== Inefficiencies and infrastructure ==
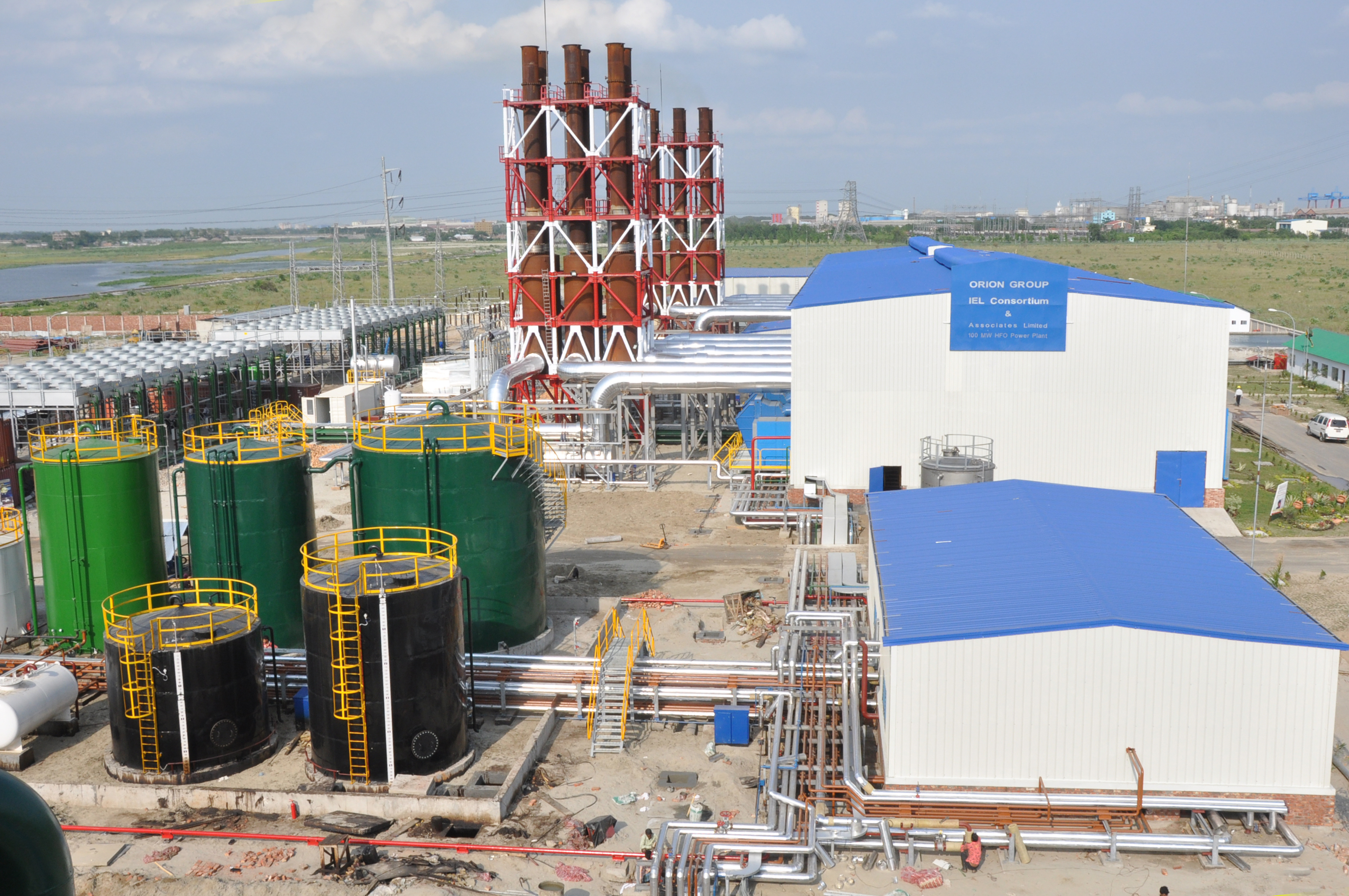
Power plant in Bangladesh

Bangladesh has small reserves of oil and coal, but very large natural gas resources. Commercial energy consumption comes mostly from natural gas (around 66%), followed by oil, hydropower, and coal. Non-commercial energy sources, such as wood fuel, and crop residues, are estimated to account for over half of the country's energy consumption.

A 2014 news report stated that:

Bangladesh is considered one of the most energy-poor nations, with one of the lowest per capita electricity consumption rates in the world. More than a third of Bangladesh's 166 million people still have no access to electricity, while the country often is able to produce only some of its 11,500-megawatt generation capacity.

In generating and distributing electricity, the failure to adequately manage the load leads to extensive load shedding which results in severe disruption in the industrial production and other economic activities. A recent survey reveals that power outages result in a loss of industrial output worth $1 billion a year which reduces the GDP growth by about half a percentage point in Bangladesh. A major hurdle in efficiently delivering power is caused by the inefficient distribution system. It is estimated that the total transmission and distribution losses in Bangladesh amount to one-third of the total generation, the value of which is equal to US$247 million per year.

In 2011, there were proposals to upgrade the grid technologies to digital smart metering systems and investing in renewable energy technologies to produce 5% of total power generation by 2015 & 10% by 2020, as noted in the National Renewable Energy Policy of 2008. American engineer Sanwar Sunny said that the city should put more effort in zoning areas to encourage more self-reliant subdivisions and higher density housing around subways to be more sustainable, as during peak times load shedding would not affect everyone. It will reduce effects of power cuts and provide stability to the power sector. He proposed that radio transmitters could be operating remotely in unlicensed radio bands using two way real time communication and transmit coded instructions from the central to the circuit breakers in selected coordinates of the micro grids substations thereby maintain multiple power flow lines with automated control and digital metering. Using this technology, Feed-in tariffs (FIT) would also be possible, as the energy usage could be monitored remotely and private power generation and energy efficient entities could be offered rebates and incentives. "This will also expedite investments in this sector, create job opportunities for engineering graduates and technicians, and ease pressures on the government" he said. Think tanks such as Bangladesh Solar Energy Society and Renewable Energy Institute (REI), along with European International Development Government Agencies such as Deutsche Gesellschaft für Internationale Zusammenarbeit supported this scheme. However, The Secretary of the Ministry of Power, Government of Bangladesh has said that the government has no plans to do so.

In March 2026, Bangladesh sought to secure approximately $2 billion in loans from multilateral agencies to address energy security concerns amid rising global fuel prices linked to the Iran war.The International Monetary Fund (IMF) committed $1.3 billion, while the Asian Development Bank (ADB) pledged $500 million in budgetary support. The government also considered approaching the World Bank for additional assistance, aiming to preserve foreign currency reserves.

== Nuclear power ==
To ensure growing energy supply and reducing green house gas emission, Bangladesh sees Nuclear energy as a viable option.

To this fact, the govt of Bangladesh has already started construction of the Rooppur Nuclear Power Plant. It will be a 2.4 GWe nuclear power plant and will be the country's first. The power plant is being constructed at Rooppur of Pabna District, on the bank of the river Padma, 87 miles (140 km) west of Dhaka. The first of the two unit is expected to go into operation in 2024. Once completed, the plant is expected to generate around 15% of the nation's electricity demand.

=== 2nd nuclear plant ===
The current government has decided to construct a 2nd nuclear plant in the southern part of the country. The possible sites are - Gangamati in Patuakhali, Majher Char in Barguna, Boyar Char in Noakhali and Muhurir Char in Feni. The project is still in early stage of development. Russian, Chinese and Korean companies has expressed interest to build and finance the project.

== See also ==
- Bangladesh Energy Regulatory Commission
- Bangladesh Power Development Board
- List of power stations in Bangladesh
- Power Grid Company of Bangladesh
- Electricity sector in India
- Energy policy of India
- Solar power in India
