= Power Division =

- Formation: 1998
- Headquarters: Dhaka, Bangladesh
- Region served: Bangladesh
- Official language: Bengali
- Website: Power Division

Power Division (Bengali: বিদ্যুৎ বিভাগ) is a Bangladesh government division under the Ministry of Power, Energy and Mineral Resources responsible for electric power industry of Bangladesh.

== History ==
The power division was created in 1998 by the government of Bangladesh as part of reforms of the Ministry of Power, Energy and Mineral Resources. It created a reform policy for the electric power sector in 2000. Together with the Energy and Mineral Resources Division, it received 5 percent of the national budget in 2018. On 2 June 2019, the Power Division announced plans to cancel a contract to Beximco Group to build a solar power plant. Muhammad Fouzul Kabir Khan is the former Secretary of this division.
