= Bangladesh Rural Electrification Board =

Bangladeshi government organisation

- Abbreviation: BREB
- Formation: 1977
- Type: Government
- Headquarters: Dhaka, Bangladesh
- Region served: Bangladesh
- Official language: Bengali
- Chief Adviser: Muhammad Yunus
- Adviser, Interim Government: Fouzul Kabir Khan
- Chairman of the Board: Major General Mahbubul Haque
- Website: reb.gov.bd

The Bangladesh Rural Electrification Board or BREB, is a government organization in Dhaka, Bangladesh and is responsible for rural electrification. It is the largest power distribution organization in Bangladesh. BREB has brought all the 461 upazilas on the electricity grid under 100% electrification. Major General S M Zia-Ul-Azim is the present chairman of the board.

== History ==
The Rural Electrification Board was established in 1977. It implements electrification of rural areas in Bangladesh and builds electric lines and sub stations. Its counterpart Bangladesh Power Development Board manages electric distribution in urban areas. Rural electrification council in a subsidiary of the board and acts as a consumer cooperative. The board has expanded rural electric connections rapidly. It has taken some market shares of solar energy.

== Board members ==
There are 12 member of board.

1. Chairman
2. Member Admin
3. Member Finance
4. Member Distribution and Operation
5. Member Planning and Development
6. Member Samity Management
7. Member BSCIC
8. Member BADC
9. Member PGCB
10. Member ICAB
11. Member BRDB
12. Member BPDB

== List of former chairman ==
Name	Term start	Term end	Reference
Brigadier General Sabihuddin Ahmed	2 January 1978	25 June 1986	
Brigadier General Mohammad Abdul Halim	26 June 1986	15 May 1989	
Brigadier General Golam Mawla	15 May 1989	13 August 1991	
Brigadier General Zaheed Latif	7 October 1991	27 January 1993	
Brigadier General Mohammad Enamul Haque	27 January 1993	5 October 1997	
Brigadier General M. A. Malek	5 October 1997	4 June 2000	
Mejbah Uddin Ahmed	28 June 2000	11 September 2001	
Ziaul Islam Chowdhury	11 September 2001	30 December 2004	
Dewan Zakir Hossain	30 December 2004	17 January 2005	
A. K. M. Helaluzzaman	17 January 2005	30 April 2006	
Md. Touhidul Islam	30 April 2006	12 October 2006	
Md. Habib Ullah Mazumdar	9 November 2006	8 February 2009	
Nasir Uddin Ahmed	8 February 2009	8 March 2009	
Bhuiyan Safiqul Islam	18 March 2009	2 October 2011	
Md. Mojibur Rahman	3 October 2011	24 October 2011	
Major General Moin Uddin	24 October 2011	5 January 2022	
Md Selim Uddin	7 January 2022	27 December 2023	
Ajay Kumar Chakroborty	30 December 2023	20 August 2024	
Major General S M Zia-Ul-Azim	20 August 2024	present	

== Zones ==
1. Barisal Zone
2. Chattagram Zone
3. Dhaka Zone
4. Khulna Zone
5. Mymensingh Zone
6. Rajshahi Zone
7. Rangpur Zone
8. Sylhet Zone

== List of Palli Bidyut Samity ==
There are 80 subsidiaries of BREB.

1. Narayanganj Palli Bidyut Samity-1
2. Narayanganj Palli Bidyut Samity-2
3. Dhaka Palli Bidyut Samity-1
4. Dhaka Palli Bidyut Samity-2
5. Dhaka Palli Bidyut Samity-3
6. Dhaka Palli Bidyut Samity-4
7. Gazipur Palli Bidyut Samity-1
8. Gazipur Palli Bidyut Samity-2
9. Mymensingh Palli Bidyut Samity-1
10. Mymensingh Palli Bidyut Samity-2
11. Mymensingh Palli Bidyut Samity-3
12. Tangail Palli Bidyut Samity
13. Pabna Palli Bidyut Samity-1
14. Pabna Palli Bidyut Samity-2
15. Netrokona Palli Bidyut Samity
16. Chattagram Palli Bidyut Samity-1
17. Chattagram Palli Bidyut Samity-2
18. Chattagram Palli Bidyut Samity-3
19. Feni Palli Bidyut Samity
20. Comilla Palli Bidyut Samity-1
21. Comilla Palli Bidyut Samity-2
22. Comilla Palli Bidyut Samity-3
23. Comilla Palli Bidyut Samity-4
24. Chandpur Palli Bidyut Samity-2
25. Chandpur Palli Bidyut Samity-1
26. Cox'sbazar Palli Bidyut Samity
27. Sylhet Palli Bidyut Samity-1
28. Sylhet Palli Bidyut Samity-2
29. Sunamganj Palli Bidyut Samity
30. Kishoreganj Palli Bidyut Samity
31. Jamalpur Palli Bidyut Samity
32. Khulna Palli Bidyut Samity
33. Barishal Palli Bidyut Samity-1
34. Barishal Palli Bidyut Samity-2
35. Dinajpur Palli Bidyut Samity-1
36. Dinajpur Palli Bidyut Samity-2
37. Natore Palli Bidyut Samity-1
38. Natore Palli Bidyut Samity-2
39. Jhalakathi Palli Bidyut Samity
40. Munshiganj Palli Bidyut Samity
41. Shariyatpur Palli Bidyut Samity
42. Madaripur Palli Bidyut Samity
43. Faridpur Palli Bidyut Samity
44. Gaibandha Palli Bidyut Samity
45. Gopalganj Palli Bidyut Samity
46. Bagerhat Palli Bidyut Samity
47. Bhola Palli Bidyut Samity
48. Bogra Palli Bidyut Samity-1
49. Bogra Palli Bidyut Samity-2
50. Bhrammanbaria Palli Bidyut Samity
51. Chapainawabganj Palli Bidyut Samity
52. Habiganj Palli Bidyut Samity
53. Jessore Palli Bidyut Samity-1
54. Jessore Palli Bidyut Samity-2
55. Jhenaidaha Palli Bidyut Samity
56. Jaypurhat Palli Bidyut Samity
57. Kustia Palli Bidyut Samity
58. Kuri-lal Palli Bidyut Samity
59. LakkhipurPalli Bidyut Samity
60. Magura Palli Bidyut Samity
61. Meherpur Palli Bidyut Samity
62. Moulavibazar Palli Bidyut Samity
63. Naogaon Palli Bidyut Samity-1
64. Naogaon Palli Bidyut Samity-2
65. Narasingdhi Palli Bidyut Samity-1
66. Narasingdhi Palli Bidyut Samity-2
67. Nilphamari Palli Bidyut Samity
68. Noakhali Palli Bidyut Samity
69. Patuakhali Palli Bidyut Samity
70. Pirojpur Palli Bidyut Samity
71. Rajbari Palli Bidyut Samity
72. Rajshahi Palli Bidyut Samity
73. Rangpur Palli Bidyut Samity-1
74. Rangpur Palli Bidyut Samity-2
75. Sherpur Palli Bidyut Samity
76. Sirajgonj Palli Bidyut Samity-1
77. Sirajgonj Palli Bidyut Samity-2
78. Shatkhira Palli Bidyut Samity
79. Thakurgaon Palli Bidyut Samity
80. Manikganj Palli Bidyut Samity

== Central warehouses ==
1. Central Warehouse, Dhaka
2. Central Warehouse, Khulna
3. Central Warehouse, Chattagram
