= Energy and Mineral Resources Division =

- Formation: 1998
- Headquarters: Dhaka, Bangladesh
- Coordinates: 23.7287°N 90.4095°E
- Region served: Bangladesh
- Official language: Bengali
- Website: emrd.gov.bd

The Energy and Mineral Resources Division (জ্বালানি ও খনিজ সম্পদ বিভাগ) is a Bangladesh government division under the Ministry of Power, Energy and Mineral Resources responsible for managing hydrocarbon mining and processing in Bangladesh. Khairuzzaman Mozumder is the secretary in charge of the division.

== History ==
The Energy and Mineral Resources Division was established in 1998 under the Ministry of Power, Energy and Mineral Resources.
