= List of government-owned companies of Bangladesh =

This is a list of notable government-owned companies of Bangladesh.

== A & B ==
- Adamjee Jute Mills
- Ashuganj Fertilizer and Chemical Company Limited
- Ashuganj Power Station Company Limited
- Bakhrabad Gas Distribution Company Limited
- Bangladesh Agricultural Development Corporation
- Bangladesh Blade Factory Limited
- Bangladesh Chemical Industries Corporation
- Bangladesh Communication Satellite Company Limited
- Bangladesh Diesel Plant Limited
- Bangladesh Film Development Corporation
- Bangladesh Fisheries Development Corporation
- Bangladesh Forest Industries Development Corporation
- Bangladesh Gas Fields Company Limited
- Bangladesh House Building Finance Corporation
- Bangladesh Infrastructure Finance Fund Limited
- Bangladesh Inland Water Transport Corporation
- Bangladesh Insulator and Sanitaryware Factory Limited
- Bangladesh Jute Mills Corporation
- Bangladesh Machine Tools Factory
- Bangladesh Municipal Development Fund
- Bangladesh Ordnance Factories
- Bangladesh Overseas Employment and Services Limited
- Bangladesh Parjatan Corporation
- Bangladesh Petroleum Exploration and Production Company Limited
- Bangladesh Shipping Corporation
- Bangladesh Small and Cottage Industries Corporation
- Bangladesh Steel and Engineering Corporation
- Bangladesh Submarine Cable Company Limited
- Bangladesh Sugar and Food Industries Corporation
- Bangladesh Telecommunications Company Limited
- Bangladesh Textile Mills Corporation
- Bangladesh Power Development Board

== C ==
- Carew & Co (Bangladesh) Ltd
- Chittagong Dry Dock Limited
- Chittagong Urea Fertilizer Limited
- Coal Power Generation Company Bangladesh Limited

== D ==
- Dhaka Electric Supply Company Limited
- Dhaka Power Distribution Company
- Dockyard and Engineering Works Limited
- Dhaka Mass Transit Company Limited

== E ==
- Eastern Cables Limited
- Eastern Refinery Limited
- Eastern Tubes Limited
- Eastern Lubricants Blenders Limited
- Electricity Generation Company of Bangladesh
- Essential Drugs Company

== G ==
- Gas Transmission Company Limited
- Gazi Wires Limited

== I ==
- Infrastructure Development Company Limited
- Infrastructure Investment Facilitation Company
- Investment Corporation of Bangladesh

== J ==
- Jamuna Fertilizer Company Limited
- Jiban Bima Corporation

== K ==
- Karnaphuli Fertilizer Company Limited
- Karnaphuli Gas Distribution Company Limited
- Karnaphuli Paper Mills

== L ==
- LP Gas Limited

== M ==
- Milk Vita
- Miracle Industries Limited
- MJLBL

== N ==
- National Tubes Limited
- North West Zone Power Distribution Company Limited
- Northern Electricity Supply Company PLC
- Northwest Power Generation Company
- Nuclear Power Plant Company Bangladesh Limited

== P ==
- Palli Karma Sahayak Foundation
- Petrobangla
- Power Grid Company of Bangladesh Limited
- Pragoti
- Padma Oil Company Limited
- Petroleum Transmission Company PLC

== R ==
- Rupantarita Prakritik Gas Company Limited
- Rural Electrification Board
- Rural Power Company Limited

== S ==
- Sundarban Gas Distribution Company Limited
- Sadharan Bima Corporation
- Shahjalal Fertiliser Factory
- Shyampur Sugar Mills
- Sylhet Gas Fields Limited

== T ==
- Telephone Shilpa Sangstha
- Teletalk Bangladesh Limited
- Trading Corporation of Bangladesh
- Triple Super Phosphate Complex Limited
- Titas Gas Transmission and Distribution Company Limited

== U ==
- Usmania Glass Sheet Factory Limited

== W ==
- West Zone Power Distribution Company Limited
