= Chemical industry in Bangladesh =

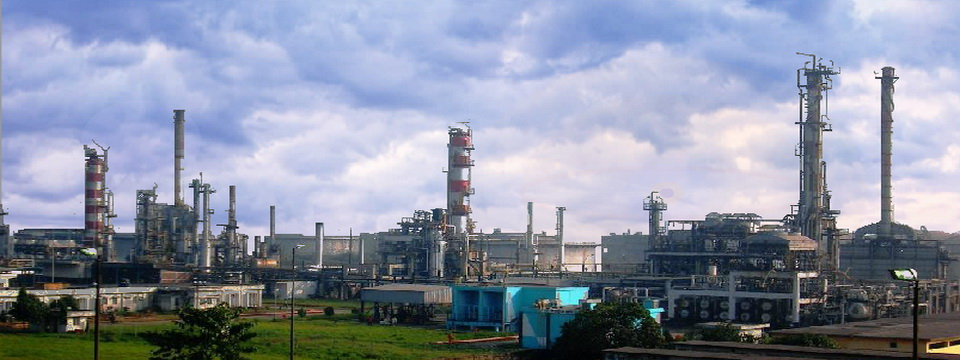
Eastern Oil Refinery

The chemical industry in Bangladesh is a small part of the overall industrial base of the country.

Major sectors of chemical production in Bangladesh include pharmaceutical production, fertilizers, refineries, inorganic chemicals and some specialty chemicals.

== Key sectors ==
=== Agrochemicals ===
Bangladesh has quite a few government run as well as private fertilizer factories. These include: Triple Super Phosphate Complex Limited, DAP Fertilizer Company Limited etc.

=== Ceramic industry ===
Ceramics industry in Bangladesh contributes to making crockeries, kitchenware, tiles and sanitaryware.

=== Paint and Dye industry ===
Berger paints, Asian paints, Roxy paints, Elite paints are some of the most well known paint companies with manufacturing in Bangladesh. Berger Paints, Asian Paints, Nippon Paint, Jotun Paint, AkzoNobel (joint venture with ACI), Kansai Nerolac Paint multinational corporations controls 82% of the market share and eight major local player vie for the rest of the market.

In 2025, the industry was worth BDT 62.5 billion, with 6-8% CAGR.

=== Petrochemicals ===
Bangladesh has only one petroleum refinery, Eastern Refinery Limited. A second unit was planned and later fast tracked after Iran war fuel crisis.

=== Pharmaceuticals ===
The biggest chemical industry in terms of contribution to GDP is the pharmaceutical industry in Bangladesh. The industry has many state of the art pharmaceutical production plants. There are also a few API plants with others in construction.

=== Plastic industry ===
Plastic industry, aka formation of products from plastic beads and recycled plastics is a major sector of the chemical industry in Bangladesh.

=== Toiletries ===
Unilever Bangladesh, Square, Kohinoor Chemical Company are leading toiletries and personal care product manufacturer of the country.

=== Specialty chemicals ===
Bangladesh also produces other chemical products such as hydrogen peroxide, sodium hydroxide, bleaching powder etc.

== Chemical plants ==
=== Fertilizer plants ===
- Ashuganj Fertilizer and Chemical Company Limited
- Chittagong Urea Fertilizer Limited
- DAP Fertilizer Company Limited
- Ghorasal Polash Urea Fertilizer Public Limited Company
- Karnaphuli Fertilizer Company Limited
- Jamuna Fertilizer Company Limited
- Shahjalal Fertiliser Factory
- Triple Super Phosphate Complex Limited

=== Refinery ===
- Eastern Refinery Limited

== Enterprises ==
Major chemical companies of Bangladesh include:

- ACI Limited
- Bangladesh Chemical Industries Corporation
  - Bangladesh Insulator and Sanitaryware Factory Limited
  - Karnaphuli Paper Mills
  - Khulna Hard Board Mills Limited
  - Khulna Newsprint Mills Limited
  - Miracle Industries Limited (plastic packaging)
  - North Bengal Paper Mills Limited
- Bengal Group of Industries
- Berger Paints Bangladesh Limited
- Keya Group
- Kohinoor Chemical
- Linde Bangladesh (gas producer)
- Meghna Group of Industries
- Partex Group
- PRAN-RFL Group
- RAK Ceramics
- Shinepukur Ceramics
- Square Group
- Unilever Bangladesh

Note: Exclusively pharmaceutical companies have been excluded to keep the list short. For that see list of pharmaceutical companies of Bangladesh.

== Safety ==
Bangladesh's chemical industry faces challenge in implementing proper safety standards in storage and transportation of chemical compounds. These have culminated in tragic accidents including Sitakunda fire, Nimtali fire.

== See also ==
- Ceramics industry in Bangladesh
- Pharmaceutical industry in Bangladesh
