= Shah Md. Imdadul Haque =

Bangladeshi civil servant

- Occupation: Civil servant

Shah Md. Imdadul Haque is a Bangladeshi civil servant and chairman of the Bangladesh Chemical Industries Corporation. He is the chairman of Synovia Pharma PLC, which is owned by BEXIMCO Group. He is the chairman of Saudi Bangla Integrated Cement Company Limited. He is the chairman of Usmania Glass Sheet Factory Limited. He is a director of Jamuna Fertilizer Company Limited. He is the chairman of Training Institute for Chemical Industries. He is the chairman of Karnaphuli Fertilizer Company Limited. He is a former chief executive officer of the Dhaka South City Corporation.

== History ==
Haque joined Bangladesh Civil Service as an administration officer.

Haque served in the Security Service Division of the Ministry of Home Affairs as an additional secretary in 2018.

Haque was the chief executive officer of the Dhaka South City Corporation in 2020 and briefly headed the city corporation during mayoral elections. During the COVID-19 pandemic in Bangladesh, he failed to keep a track of Bangladeshis returning from abroad to Dhaka.

On 28 June 2021, Haque was appointed Chairman of the Bangladesh Chemical Industries Corporation. He was serving at the Ministry of Fisheries and Livestock as an additional secretary. He is a member of the governing body of Ibrahim Medical College. He told The Daily Star, that he was unaware of gas wastage in BCIC fertilizer factories. He is the chairman of Synovia Pharma PLC which gave 20 percent cash dividend in June 2022. He is the chairman of BCIC College.
