= Rafiquddin Ahmad =

Bangladeshi businessman

Rafiquddin Ahmad (1 March 1932 – 13 September 2013) was chairman of Bangladesh Engineering and Shipbuilding Corporation. Throughout his career he was the founding chairman of Bangladesh Chemical Industries Corporation (BCIC), was founding director of ICTVTR, now known as Islamic University of Technology (IUT), was founding member of the Institution of Engineers, Bangladesh and former chairman of Bangladesh Steel and Engineering Corporation (BSEC). Rafiquddin Ahmad obtained his PhD from UK in 1960 and became a teacher of Bangladesh University of Engineering and Technology (BUET). He was also a key member in establishing Eastern Cables, a state-owned corporation.
