= Bangladesh Freedom Fighter Welfare Trust =

State-Owned Trust in Bangladesh

Bangladesh Freedom Fighters Welfare Trust
- Formation: September 1972
- Headquarters: Dhaka, Bangladesh
- Region served: Bangladesh
- Official language: Bengali
- Website: www.bffwt.gov.bd

Bangladesh Freedom Fighters Welfare Trust or Muktijoddha Kalyan Trust is a government owned and operated trust in Bangladesh established to look after the interest of former Mukti Bahini members and others who fought for Bangladesh in its Independence war and their family members. It is under the Ministry of Liberation War Affairs.

== History ==
It was established in September 1972. It owns a number of companies which generate include Tabani Beverage Company, Eastern Cables Industries Limited, Multiple Juice Concentrate Plant, Mimi Chocolate Limited, and Model Engineering Works. It owns four movie theatres: Gulistan, Naz, Moon, and Delwar Pictures. It also owns Gulistan Films Corporation and Durbar Advertising and Publications, Purnima Filling and Services Station. It also receives an annual 160 million taka from the government.

According to the act which established the trust a freedom fighter is "person who served as a member of any force engaged in the war of liberation but shall not include the serving members of the defence services, police or the civil armed forces, or any government pensioner, or any other person having any regular source of income". The Government of Bangladesh in the 1970s handed over the management of tanneries to the trust and Bangladesh Chemical Industries Corporation.

In 1978, the government gave the trust a further 11 nationalised companies. The nationalisation of Moon Cinema Hall led to the Bangladesh Italian Marble Works Ltd. v. Government of Bangladesh, a ground breaking case which led to the Fifth Amendment to the Constitution of Bangladesh being declared illegal.

In 1983, the government of President Hussain Muhammad Ershad withdrew the trust from Bengal National Tannery, Bengal Tannery, Hamidia Metal Industries Limited, Hamidia Oil Mils, Jatrik Publications, Madina Ternary, and Omar Sons Structures Limited.

Between 1988 and 1989, it made a list of freedom fighters in Bangladesh.

from 1994 to 1995, The government of the Bangladesh Nationalist Party closed down a number of companies of the trust; they are Hardeo Glass and Aluminum, Model Electric and Engineering Corporation, and United Tobacco Company.

In 1999, the Awami League administration was involved in corruption cases related to Gulistan Cinema Hall and Naz Cinema Hall into shopping malls in a process marked by allegations of corruption. Shops in Rajdhani Super Market were rented out at very low prices by corrupt officials. Gulistan Shopping Complex was never finished.

Tabani Beverage Company is a bottler of Coca-Cola in Bangladesh. Coca-Cola stopped its agreement with Tabani over quality issues. The Awami League regime closed Circo Soap and Chemical Industries in 2009.

In 2018, the trust closed down all of the industries it owned as corruption had made them unsustainable.

== Industries ==
- Mimi Chocolate Limited
- Tabani Bevarage Company Limited (bottled Coca-Cola)
- Bangladesh Glass Industries Limited
- Bengal National Tannery
- Baxley Paints
- Circo Soap and Chemical Industries
- Eastern Chemical Industries
- Eastern Cables Industries Limited
- Hamidia Metal Industries
- Horodeo Glass and Aluminum
- Model Electric and Engineering Works
- Multiple Juice Concentrate Plant
- National Tannery
- United Tobacco Company Limited
