= List of pharmaceutical companies of Bangladesh =

Company of Bangladesh

This is a list of notable pharmaceutical companies of Bangladesh.

== A ==
- ACI Limited
- ACME Laboratories

== B ==
- Beacon Pharmaceuticals
- Beximco Pharma

== D ==
- Drug International
- Delta pharma LTD

== G ==
- General Pharma
- GlaxoSmithKline

== H ==
- Hamdard Bangladesh

== I ==
- Incepta Pharmaceuticals

== N ==
- Novo Nordisk
- Novartis (Bangladesh) Ltd.

== O ==
- Orion Pharma (Bangladesh)

== R ==
- Renata Limited

== S ==
- Sadhana Aushadhalaya
- Sanofi Bangladesh Ltd.
- SK+F
- Social Marketing Company (SMC)
- Square Pharmaceuticals
