= BPJ =

BPJ may refer to:

- Bangladesh Pharmaceutical Journal, official journal of the Bangladesh Pharmaceutical Society
- Beloit Poetry Journal, poetry magazine at Beloit College
- Binji language, ISO 639 code 'bpj'
