= Chandraghona =

Bangladeshi town

Coordinates: 22°29′N 92°08′E

Chandraghona is a village on the Karnaphuli River in the Chittagong Division of Bangladesh.

== Geography ==
The village is located on the Kaptai Road between Kaptai Upazila and Rangunia Upazila, 48 kilometres from the city of Chittagong. It is 24 km (15 mi) from Bahaddarhut bus station. One of the larger fields of the Bangladeshi crop Gumai Jheel is in the area.

Cultures represented here include those of the Chakma people and Marma people. There are historic Buddhist temples in the region.

== Economy ==
One of the larger paper mills in South Asia, the Karnaphuli Paper Mills Limited, is located in Karnaphuli. It was the first paper manufacturing industrial establishment registered under the Factories Act in then East Pakistan. At the time of its establishment, it was the biggest paper mill in Asia, with over 3,000 workers. There is also a rayon factory in town.

== See also ==
- Karnaphuli River topics
