= Kohinoor Chemical Company (Bangladesh) Limited =

Oldest cosmetics and soap manufacturer in Bangladesh

- Formation: 1956
- Headquarters: Dhaka, Bangladesh
- Region served: Bangladesh
- Official language: Bengali
- Owner: Orion Group (Bangladesh)
- Website: kohinoor-bd.com

Kohinoor Chemical Company (Bangladesh) Limited (Bengali: কোহিনূর কেমিক্যাল কোম্পানী (বাংলাদেশ) লিমিটেড) is the oldest cosmetics and soap manufacturer in Bangladesh. It is owned by Orion Group, a large diversified conglomerate whose chairman is Mohammad Obaidul Karim. Md. Rezaul Karim is the managing director of the Kohinoor Chemical Company (Bangladesh) Limited.

Its brands have been described as popular among "middle-class and rural people" of Bangladesh. It is listed on the Dhaka Stock Exchange and Chittagong Stock Exchange. It has the second largest share of the soap market in Bangladesh after Unilever Bangladesh Limited, subsidiary of Unilever, with 50 percent.

== History ==
Kohinoor Chemical Company (Bangladesh) Limited was established in 1956 at Tejgaon Industrial Area, Dacca.

In 1971, the company was nationalized after the Independence of Bangladesh from Pakistan and placed under Bangladesh Chemical Industries Corporation. It became a public limited company in 1998. The operations in Pakistan continue as Kohinoor Chemical Company (Pvt) Ltd, a separate company.

Orion Group bought the state owned Kohinoor Chemical Company (Bangladesh) Limited, a deal made possible by the close friendship of the group chairman with Prime Minister Khaleda Zia, in 1993. At the time, Kohinoor was listed on the stock exchange and making a profit. He was also close to Bangladesh Nationalist Party politicians Tarique Rahman, son of Prime Minister Khaleda Zia, and Harris Chowdhury, political secretary of Khaleda Zia. Orion inflated the share prices before the 1996 stock exchange crash which prompted an investigation by the Bangladesh Securities and Exchange Commission. The company did not pay a dividend till 2005.

The company had a 19 percent growth in 2023, outperforming its competitors.

== Brands ==
- Fast Wash
- Sandalina
- Tibet
- Bactrol
- Xpert
- Beautina
- Ice Cool
- Clean Master
- Fruity
- Am Pm
- Genster
- Wiper
