= General Electric Manufacturing Company Limited =

- Formation: 1972
- Headquarters: Chittagong, Bangladesh
- Region served: Bangladesh
- Official language: Bengali
- Chairman: Md. Shahidul Hoque Bhuia ndc
- Website: www.gemco.gov.bd

General Electric Manufacturing Company Limited (Bengali: জেনারেল ইলেকট্রিক ম্যানুফ্যাকচারিং কোং লিঃ) is a Bangladesh government owned company that manufactures electric transformers. Eng. Ashraful Islam is the managing director of the company. It is a subsidiary of Bangladesh Steel and Engineering Corporation.

== History ==
General Electric Manufacturing Company Limited was established in 1972 by the government of Bangladesh. It was built with technical assistance of M/s. Promash Export, a company of the Soviet Union, to manufacture electric equipment like power transformers and completed in 1978. It was incorporated as a limited liability company in 1979. It is located in Patenga, Chittagong. It owns the largest transformer factory in Bangladesh.

In March 2019, the company signed an agreement worth 35 million taka with Engineering Dimension, a Saudi Arabian company.
