= Bangladesh Diesel Plant =

Machine Manufacturer

- Type: Commercial Enterprise under the Management of Bangladesh Army
- Founded: 25 June 1980
- Headquarters: Gazipur Cantonment, Shimultali, Gazipur-1700
- Key people: Brig Gen AKM Joglur Rahman Khan (Managing Director)
- Website: www.bdp.gov.bd

Bangladesh Diesel Plant Limited is a state owned company in Bangladesh, that is operated by Bangladesh Army. As of 2024, General Waker-uz-Zaman is the chairman of the board of directors and Brig Gen AKM Joglur Rahman Khan is the managing director of Bangladesh Diesel Plant Limited.

== History ==
Bangladesh Diesel Plant Limited was a government owned corporation under the state owned Bangladesh Steel and Engineering Corporation. It was closed in 2004 because of high losses with 740 million taka in debt.

In 2007 the plant was handed over to the Bangladesh Army which was able to make the plant profitable. The plant was initially supposed to go to Bangladesh Rifles but it was later changed to Bangladesh Army according to then parliamentary body chairman Muhammad Mahbubur Rahman. The company imported battery operated rickshaw in 2009. The plant assembled the rickshaws despite the rickshaws not being street legal.

In 2010 the plant received a contract from Bangladesh government to build a 50 MW diesel power plant. It owns DPA Power Generation International Limited, a joint venture with Primordial Energy Limited and Aggretech AG. The company will establish a powerplant at Pagla Army Camp in Narayanganj District. It was a 50 megawatt rental power plant. The plant was inaugurated by Prime Minister Sheikh Hasina in 2011. The Bangladesh Diesel Plant and a Bangladesh Army unit commanded by Brigadier General Mostafa Aminul Islam built the embankment at Patakhali in Koyra Upazila in 2012.

In 2013 the plant was given the contract to fill the land for Rampal Power Plant. Bangladesh Diesel Plant Limited signed a contract with Dhaka Power Distribution Company Limited to produce 10,000 prepaid electricity meters for Azimpur area in Dhaka in February 2014.

In 2016, Bangladesh Diesel Plant and Bangladesh Army constructed the Rabindra Kuthibari protection embankment. A portion of the Rabindra Kuthibari protection embankment collapsed in 2022.
