= Pharmaceutical industry in Bangladesh =

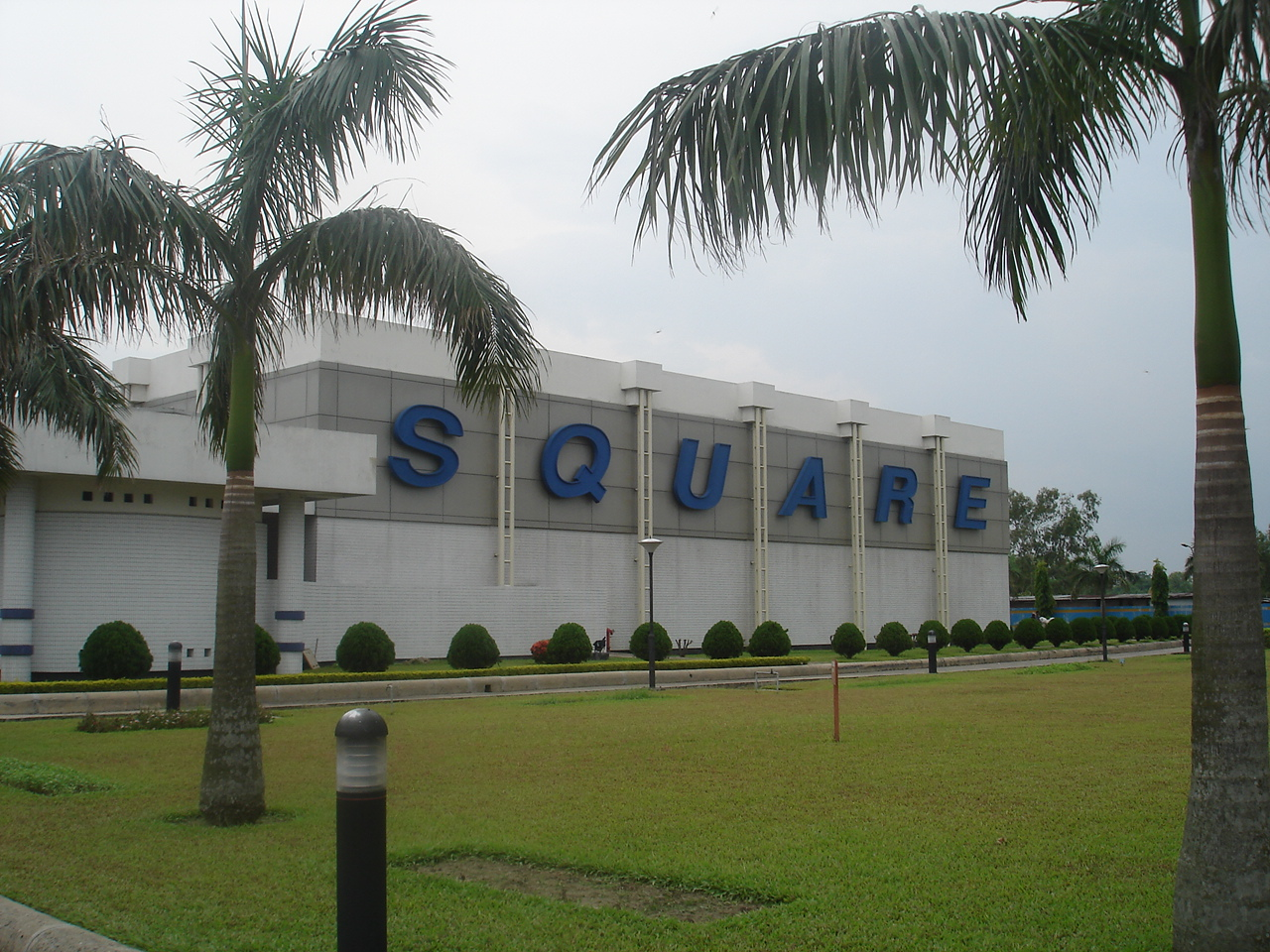
A pharmaceutical company

The pharmaceutical industry in Bangladesh is one of the most developed industrial sectors within the country. Manufacturers produce insulin, hormones, and cancer drugs. This sector provides 98% of the total domestic demand for medicine requirement in the country. This makes Bangladesh almost self sufficient in the pharmaceutical sector. The industry also exports medicines to global markets, including Europe. Pharmaceutical companies are expanding their business with the aim to expand the export market. In the period between July and February in the fiscal year 2024 to 2025, pharmaceutical export was $134.15 million, a 13% increase compared to the same period last year.

There are 5 types of medicine manufacturing companies in Bangladesh.

| Type of drug manufacturer | Number of manufacturing companies | Current manufacturing status |
|---|---|---|
| Allopathic Drug Manufacturers | 199 | Functional |
| Ayurvedic Drug Manufacturers | 172 | Functional |
| Unani Drug Manufacturers | 500 | Functional |
| Herbal Drug Manufacturers | 29 | Functional |
| Homoeopathic & Biochemic Drug Manufacturers | 28 | Functional |

== Products ==
The Industry exports active pharmaceutical ingredients (APIs) and a wide range of pharmaceutical products, covering all major therapeutic classes and dosage forms, to 79 countries. Along with regular forms like tablets, capsules and syrups, Bangladesh also exports specialized products like HFA inhalers, CFC inhalers, suppositories, nasal sprays, injectables, IV infusions, etc. These products have been well accepted by medical practitioners, chemists, patients and the regulatory bodies of all of their importing nations. The packaging and the presentation of the products of Bangladesh are comparable to any international standard.

== Regulation ==
Two organizations regulate drugs and pharmacies in Bangladesh.

The Directorate General of Drug Administration (DGDA) is the national drug regulatory authority which is under the Ministry of Health and Family Welfare. DGDA regulates all activities related to import and export of raw materials, packaging materials, production, sale, pricing, licensing, registration of all kinds of medicine including those of Ayurvedic, Unani, herbal and homeopathic systems.

The Pharmacy Council of Bangladesh(PCB) was established under the Pharmacy Ordinance Act in 1976. to control the pharmacy practice in Bangladesh. The Bangladesh Pharmaceutical Society is affiliated with the International Pharmaceutical Federation and Commonwealth Pharmaceutical Association. The National Drug Policy (2005) states that the World Health Organization’s current Good Manufacturing Practices (GMP) should be strictly followed and that manufacturing units will be regularly inspected by the DDA. Other key regulation features are restrictions on imported drugs (where these are produced by four or more local firms), a ban on local production of around 1,700 drugs that are considered non-essential or harmful and strict price controls on some 117 principal medicines.

== See also ==
- List of pharmaceutical companies of Bangladesh
