= Ceramics industry in Bangladesh =

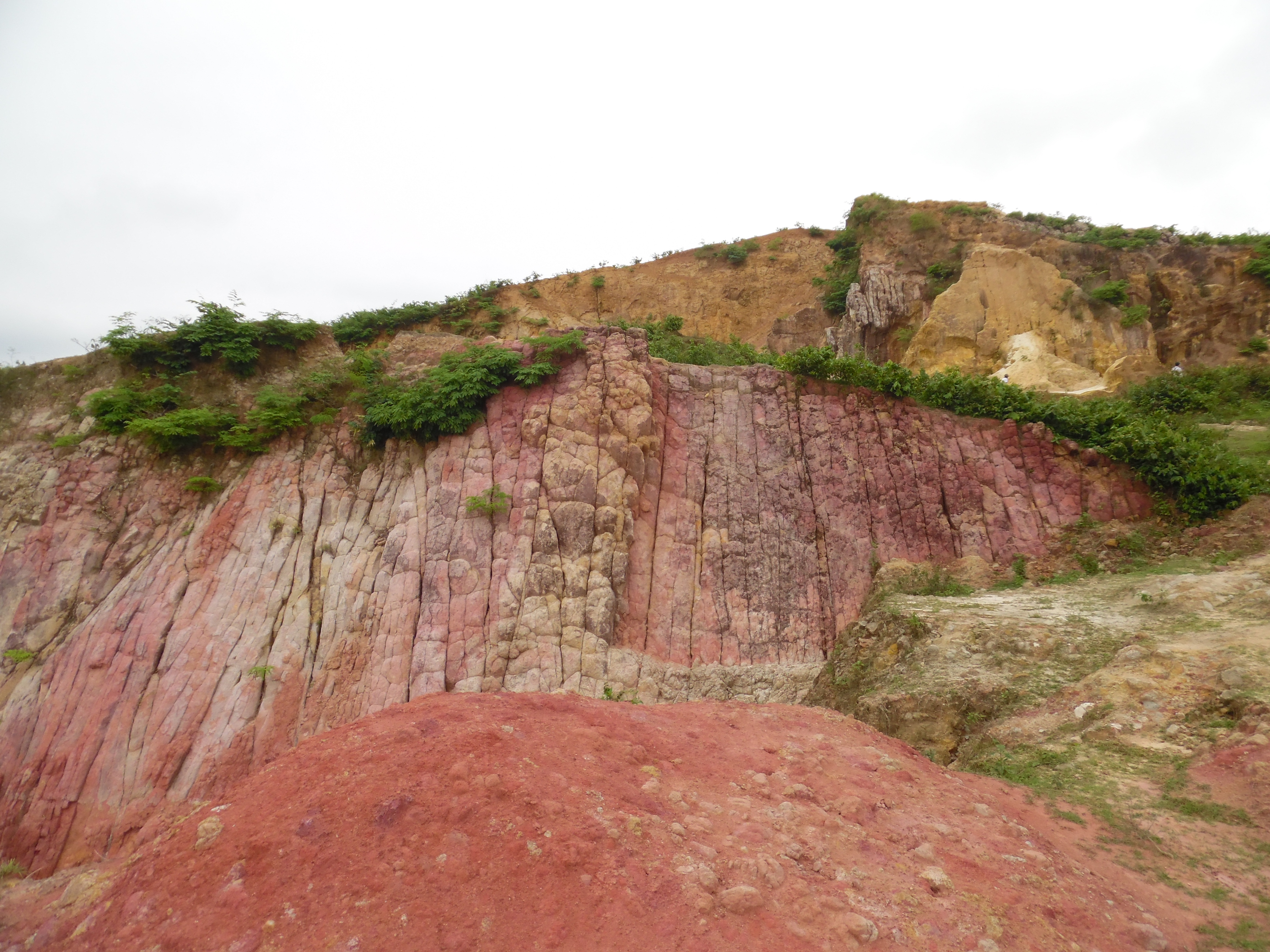
White clay mine in Bijoypur, Durgapur, Netrokona

The ceramics industry is a growing manufacturing sector in Bangladesh. The industry started in the late 1950s when the first ceramic industrial plants were established. The industry mainly produces tableware, sanitaryware and tiles. As of 2011, there were 21 ceramic industrial units throughout Bangladesh, employing about 500,000 people. In the first nine months of the 2013-14 fiscal year, Bangladesh exported about US$36 million worth of goods after meeting 80% of the domestic demand. The main export destinations are the EU, the US and the Middle East.

== History ==
The first ceramic plant was established in Bogura in 1958. Owned by Tajma Ceramic Industries, it was a small manufacturing plant for porcelain tableware.

One of the largest ceramic manufacturers in Bangladesh, Monno Ceramics, was established in 1985 to produce porcelain tableware with other ceramic items later.

Shinepukur Ceramics was established in 1997 for the production of bone china and porcelain tableware. Shinepukur later captured around 60% of the domestic market.

RAK Ceramics was incorporated in Bangladesh on 26 November 1998 and started its commercial production on 12 November 2000.

== Sources of raw material ==
Some white clay deposits have been discovered in Mymensingh, Sylhet and Netrokona. The largest deposit of white clay is situated at Bijoypur of Mymensingh which was discovered in 1957. However, ceramic manufacturers import almost all of their raw material. China, India, New Zealand and Germany are the main sources of the raw materials.

== Foreign investment ==
The ceramics industry sector has attracted foreign investment. The investments have mainly been from China and the Middle East states. Some of the major joint venture partners are RAK Ceramics, Fu Wang and China-Bangla, of which the largest is RAK of the UAE, and who have about 80% of the domestic sanitaryware market.

== Export destinations and international competitors ==
Ceramic products have been exported to more than 45 countries. The largest export destinations are the United States, Italy, Spain, France, New Zealand, the Netherlands, Australia and Sweden.

China and Thailand are amongst the major competitors in the international market for Bangladeshi ceramic manufacturers. However, the low labour costs of the local manufacturers has put Bangladesh in a strong position.
