= Khulna Hard Board Mills Limited =

Bangladeshi hardboard manufacturer in Khulna

- Formation: 1965
- Headquarters: Khulna, Bangladesh
- Coordinates: 22.8576°N 89.5505°E
- Region served: Bangladesh
- Official language: Bengali
- Parent organization: Bangladesh Chemical Industries Corporation

Khulna Hard Board Mills Limited (Bengali: খুলনা হার্ড বোর্ড মিলস লিমিটেড) is a Bangladesh government owned company based in Khulna that manufactures hardboard. The factory is in the Khalishpur Industrial Area, along the east bank of the Bhairab River and beside Khulna Newsprint Mills Limited.

== History ==
Khulna Hard Board Mills Limited was established in 1965 in Khulna. It was built by the Canadian Commercial Corporation, a Canadian Government owned company. The company started production in 1966 using Sundari wood from Sundarbans mangrove forest. It was built on about a 10-acre site along the east bank of the Bhairab River. The mill one thousand tone of wood to produce 25 tone of board per day operating at full capacity.

In 1991, the Forest Department stopped the supply of Sundari from Sundarbans. Bangladesh Chemical Industries Corporation, the holding company of Khulna Hard Board Mills limited, shifted to using different raw material. That led to a rise in the cost of raw materials and declining profits. The factory was closed in 2002.

The factory was reopened on 14 August 2005. In 2008, the factory started using non-wood raw material, like sugar sacks and saw dust, to make boards and reduce production costs.

The factory shut down again in 2010 and was reopened soon, but closed again on 21 April 2011 following a funding crises. The managing director and other officials were confined in the mill by workers protesting the closure on 22 August 2011.

In November 2012 the government of Bangladesh started a 8-month upgrade work at the mills. It was reopened on 15 August 2013 but closed down within a few months.
