= DAP Fertilizer Company Limited =

Fertilizer company in Bangladesh

- Native name: ডিএপি ফার্টিলাইজার কোম্পানী লিমিটেড
- Company type: Public
- Industry: Fertilizer
- Founded: 2001; 25 years ago
- Headquarters: Rangadia, Anowara Upazila, Chittagong, Bangladesh
- Products: Diammonium phosphate fertilizer
- Website: dapfcl.gov.bd

DAP Fertilizer Company Limited (Bengali: ডিএপি ফার্টিলাইজার কোম্পানী লিমিটেড) is a public limited diammonium phosphate (DAP) fertilizer producing company in Bangladesh under Bangladesh Chemical Industries Corporation (BCIC). It is the only DAP fertilizer manufacturing company in the country.

== Overview ==
DAP Fertilizer Company Limited is located in Rangadia union of Anwara Upazila in Chittagong. It was founded in 2001 by the Ministry of Industries with the help of China National Complete Plant Export Corporation (COMPLANT) and started its operation in 2006 under the authority of BCIC. It has two different units for manufacturing DAP fertilizer with individual production capacities of 800 and 1600 tonnes per day.

The company produces diammonium phosphate by using ammonia and phosphoric acid as primary raw materials. Ammonia is sourced as liquefied gas from Karnaphuli Fertilizer Company Limited (KAFCO) and Chittagong Urea Fertilizer Limited (CUFL) which produce it by using natural gas and carbon dioxide that is available in the atmosphere. Phosphoric acid is imported from various countries including United States, Morocco, Vietnam and China. DAP fertilizer contains 18% nitrogen (as ammonium) and 46% phosphate (as P_{2}O_{5}).

Production of DAP fertilizer at this factory is frequently disrupted for extended periods due to the unavailability and scarcity of key raw materials, namely phosphoric acid and natural gas. Consequently, the factory consistently fails to meet the production targets set by the government.

=== 2016 ammonia gas leakage ===
In 2016, an ammonia gas leak occurred at the factory of DAP Fertilizer Company Limited, affecting surrounding areas. Around 100 people fell ill due to inhalation, with 52 admitted to Chittagong Medical College Hospital. The leakage took around 15 hours to bring under control by fire service team. Two investigation committees were formed to determine the cause and assess the impact, with preliminary findings suggesting an accident. The committees also suggested punitive actions against two officials responsible for the incident.
