= Obaidul Karim =

Bangladeshi businessman

- Died: Dhaka, Bangladesh
- Occupation: Businessman
- Known for: Founder of Orion Group

Obaidul Karim is a Bangladeshi businessman and the founder and chairman of Orion Group. Besides being an entrepreneur, he is also the president of sporting club Mohammedan SC Limited.

== Career ==
The Orion Group was founded by Obaidul Karim during 1985 when he started with Orion Laboratories Ltd. The group's early growth was driven organically through operations in pharmaceuticals & LVPs and toiletries & cosmetics. In 1993 Orion acquired the then ailing Kohinoor Chemical Co Ltd, manufacturer of the major line of 'Tibet' brand toiletries and beauty care products. Orion has been a producer in the pharmaceuticals, cosmetics and toiletries sectors since 1985 in Bangladesh. More recently, Orion has been focused on infrastructure development and power generation businesses through major investments and joint ventures. One contribution in the country is the implementation of a 10 km elevated expressway (flyover) in Dhaka.

The Orion Group divides their operations into number of strategic business units with multiple subsidiary companies in agro products, cosmetic & toiletries, construction and allied, energy sector, hospitality management, infrastructure development, pharma & healthcare, power generation, real estate, sports & events and textiles & garments.

=== Power operations ===
In December 2011, the Bangladesh Power Development Board announced the signing of three agreements with Orion Group Bangladesh for setting up coal-fired power plants with total capacity of 1,200 megawatt. Orion will build two plants in Khulna and Chittagong with the capacity of 282.67 MW each and one in Munshiganj of 522MW capacity as part of a $1.7 Billion. All three plants will use imported coal to generate electricity. Orion's current HFO fuelled power generation projects of 300MW in the country contribute significantly in mitigating acute power crisis in the country.

=== Infrastructure ===
Orion Group's subsidiary companies are completing the Mayor Mohammad Hanif flyover in Dhaka. The dual carriageway flyover includes 11 slip roads or ramps (exit and entries) and will stretch from the Dhaka- Chittagong highway to Palashi. The contract is estimated to be completed by the end of 2014.

=== City Center ===
Orion has also developed City Center, a major skyscraper in the Dhaka and the tallest building in the country. The City Center project is a 39-storied commercial complex cum car parking in the business area of Dhaka city set to be the highest building in Dhaka.

== Controversy ==
=== Rise through political contacts ===
He is said to have succeeded in business because of his closeness to former prime minister Begum Khaleda Zia. Karim acquired two profitable state-owned enterprises (Kohinoor Chemical Industries and Mala Chemical Industries a.k.a. Orion Infusions) in the 1990s. In 1996, before the stock market collapsed later in the year, Orion announced large dividends and bonuses for their shareholders, pushing up their stock prices. However, after the market collapsed, the company did not produce any dividends or bonuses for their shareholders. After this happened, the Bangladesh Securities and Exchange Commission filed a case against him which was ineffective. Investigations showed that between 2001 and 2006, Karim large businesses and projects and also got involved in many financial scams. Most of the contracts won were awarded to him by the BNP government based on credibility.

=== Infrastructure ===
Orion Infrastructure Ltd. – a 11.8 km long Mayor Mohammad Hanif Flyover (earlier known as Jatrabari-Gulistan Flyover), the longest flyover of the country and the first toll based public private partnership (PPP) project. Mr. Karim revolutionized the scenario of contribution of private sector in the infrastructure development sector of Bangladesh. Applying the PPP concept in Bangladesh is the brainchild of Mr. Obaidul Karim.

He is the first to recognize the potential of PPP in the infrastructure development industry in Bangladesh, the ability of it to contribute to Bangladesh' economic growth and to generate direct and indirect employment. The concept of the 11.8-km long Mayor Mohammad Hanif Flyover project (known as Jatrabari-Gulistan Flyover) which happened to be the first longest in Bangladesh has been introduced by Mr. Karim on BOOT (build, own, operate & transfer) basis.

=== Oriental Bank ===
In December 2007, Karim was sentenced to life imprisonment by a special court for misappropriating Tk 6.7 crore from the Oriental Bank (presently ICB Islamic Bank). He was fined the same amount or two years of extended jail time if he failed to pay the fine. Karim, who was one of the banks sponsors, had the assistance of two bank officials. They opened a fake account in 2005 at Oriental Bank's principal branch with a deposit of Tk. 75 thousand. The account was opened under the name of a certain Bellal Hossain. After an investigation it was revealed that nobody named Bellal Hossain existed and it was actually a dummy account. In total, Karim and his associated in the bank embezzled around Tk. 700 crore from the Oriental Bank. Most of the money was embezzled through One Denim Mills and One Entertainment, both of which were owned by Giasuddin Al Mamun.
