= Yellow (clothing) =

Bangladesh-based fashion brand

YELLOW
- Type: Private
- Industry: Apparel/Clothing/Fashion
- Founded: 2004; 22 years ago
- Founder: Salman F Rahman
- Headquarters: Beximco Industrial Park, Dhaka, Bangladesh
- Key people: Salman F Rahman
- Products: Men's, women's, children's apparel & accessories
- Parent: Beximco
- Website: yellowclothing.net

Yellow is a Bangladesh-based fashion brand and clothing retailer owned by Beximco. Its corporate headquarters is located at Beximco Industrial Park, Dhaka, Bangladesh.

== Outlets and expansion ==
The largest of the Yellow stores are located in Bashundhara City Shopping Complex, Sanmar Ocean City Chittagong and Jamuna Future Park with other outlets at Banani, Gulshan, Dhanmondi, Mohammadpur, Mirpur, Uttara, Bailey Road, Wari and Maghbazar. There are several stores located in Pakistan.

In 2014, Beximco Luxury Lawn was launched dedicated only to women's clothing. Beximco also announced the opening of 100 projected outlets in Bangladesh and several in Dubai, New York City, and Toronto in early 2015 and Seoul in mid-2015.

== Partnerships and collaborations ==
Yellow served as the official wardrobe partner for Dhaka Dynamites and Shark Tank Bangladesh.

The brand has announced multiple collaborations with international brands like Marvel, Disney and Star Wars. It has also collaborated with the Japanese trading company ITOCHU, introducing the backpack brand 'Outdoor Products' to the Bangladeshi market.
