= Jatrabari–Gulistan Flyover =

Flyover in Dhaka, Bangladesh

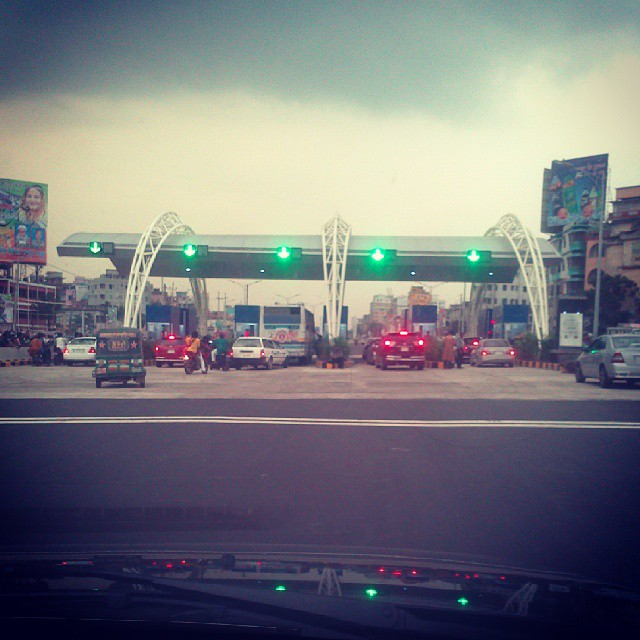
- Flyover toll booth
- Coordinates: 23.7125°N 90.4285°E
- Locale: Dhaka
- Other name: Mayor Mohammed Hanif Flyover (former name)

Characteristics
- Total length: 11.7 km

History
- Constructed by: Orion Group
- Construction start: 22 June 2010
- Construction end: 11 October 2013
- Construction cost: 21.08 billion taka

Location
- Interactive map of Jatrabari–Gulistan Flyover

Jatrabari–Gulistan Flyover is the longest flyover in Bangladesh.

The 11.7 km flyover was initiated in 1998. It partially opened on 11 October 2013. It is built for facilitating transportation and communication for the 30 southern and south-western districts of Bangladesh.

== Gallery ==
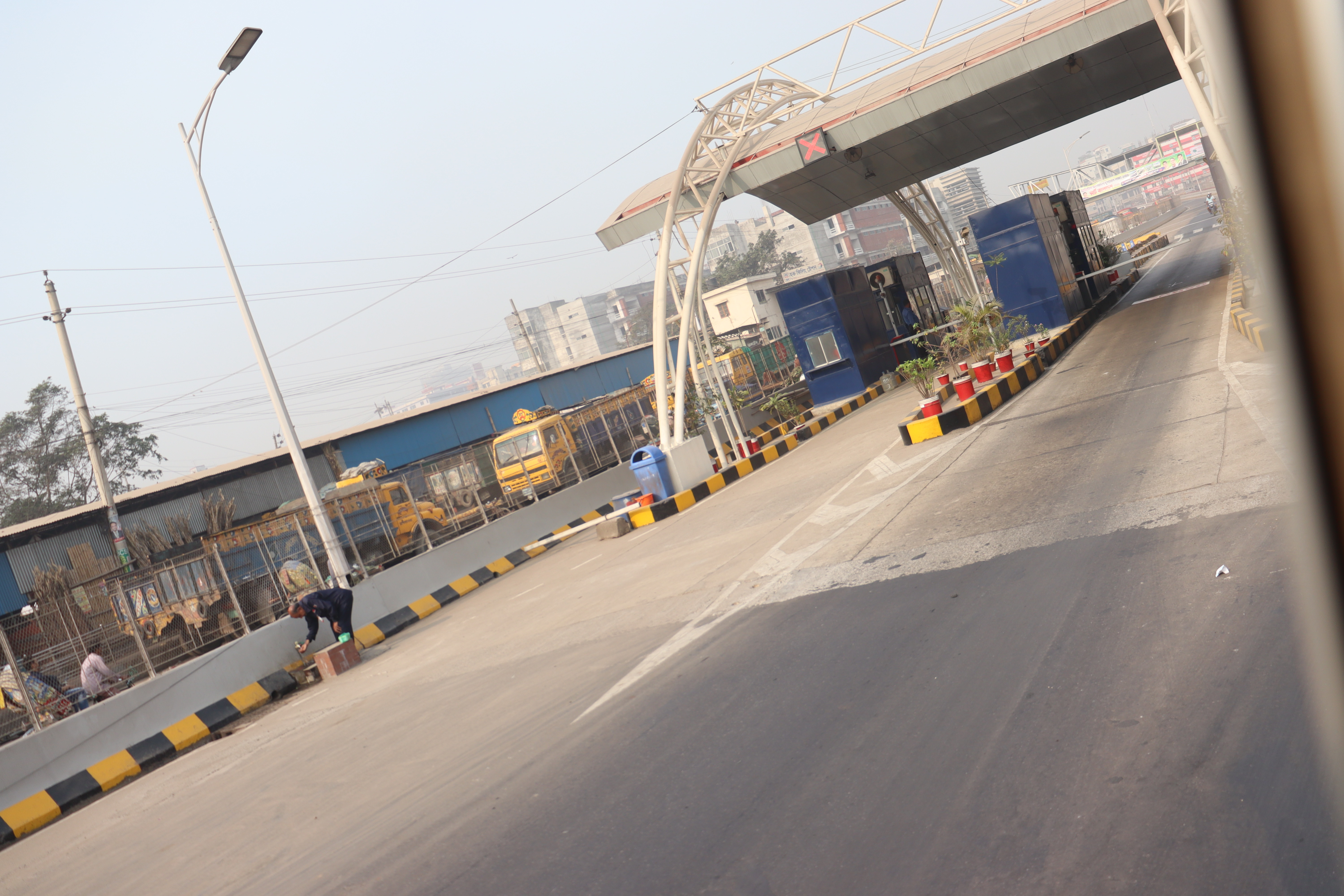

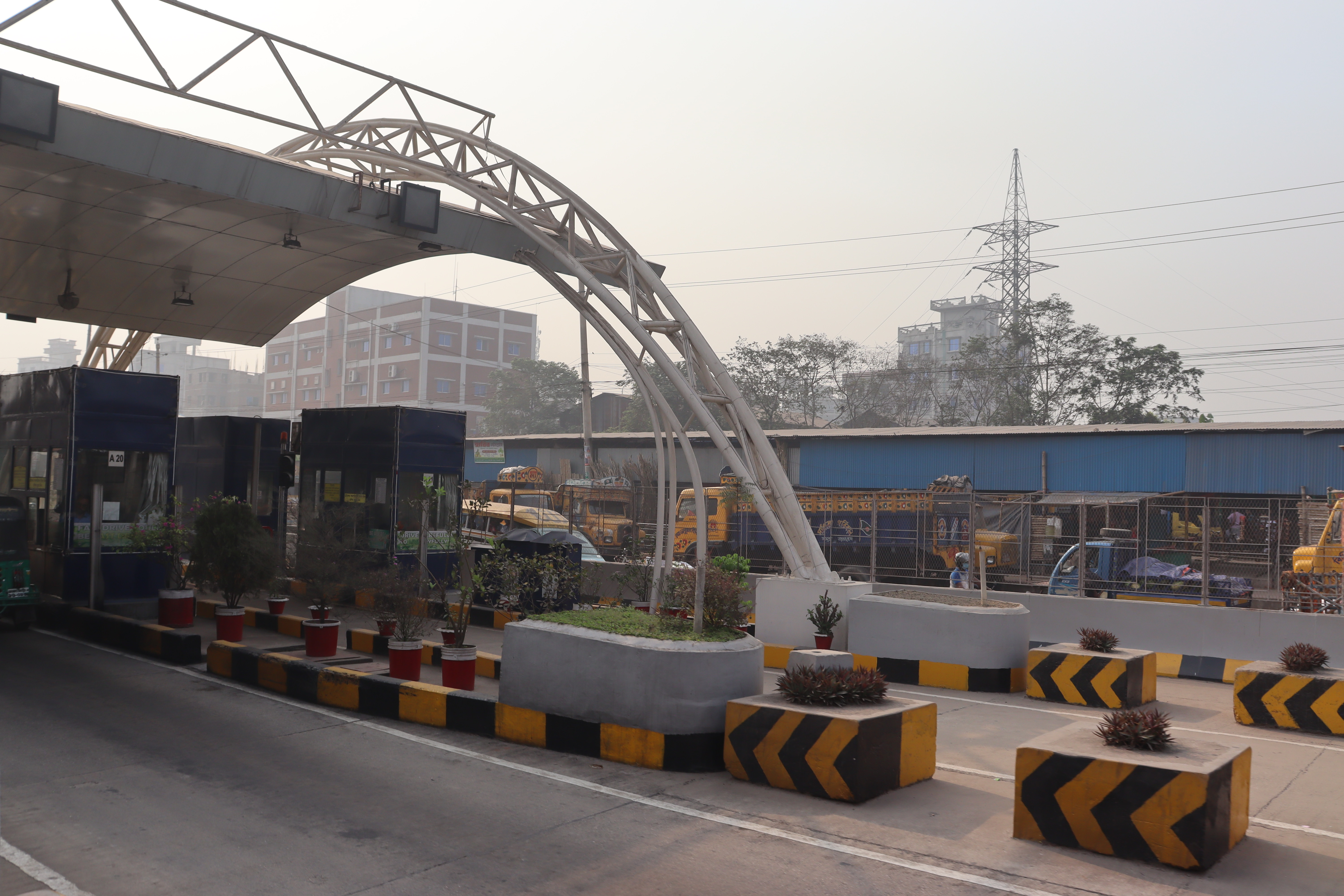

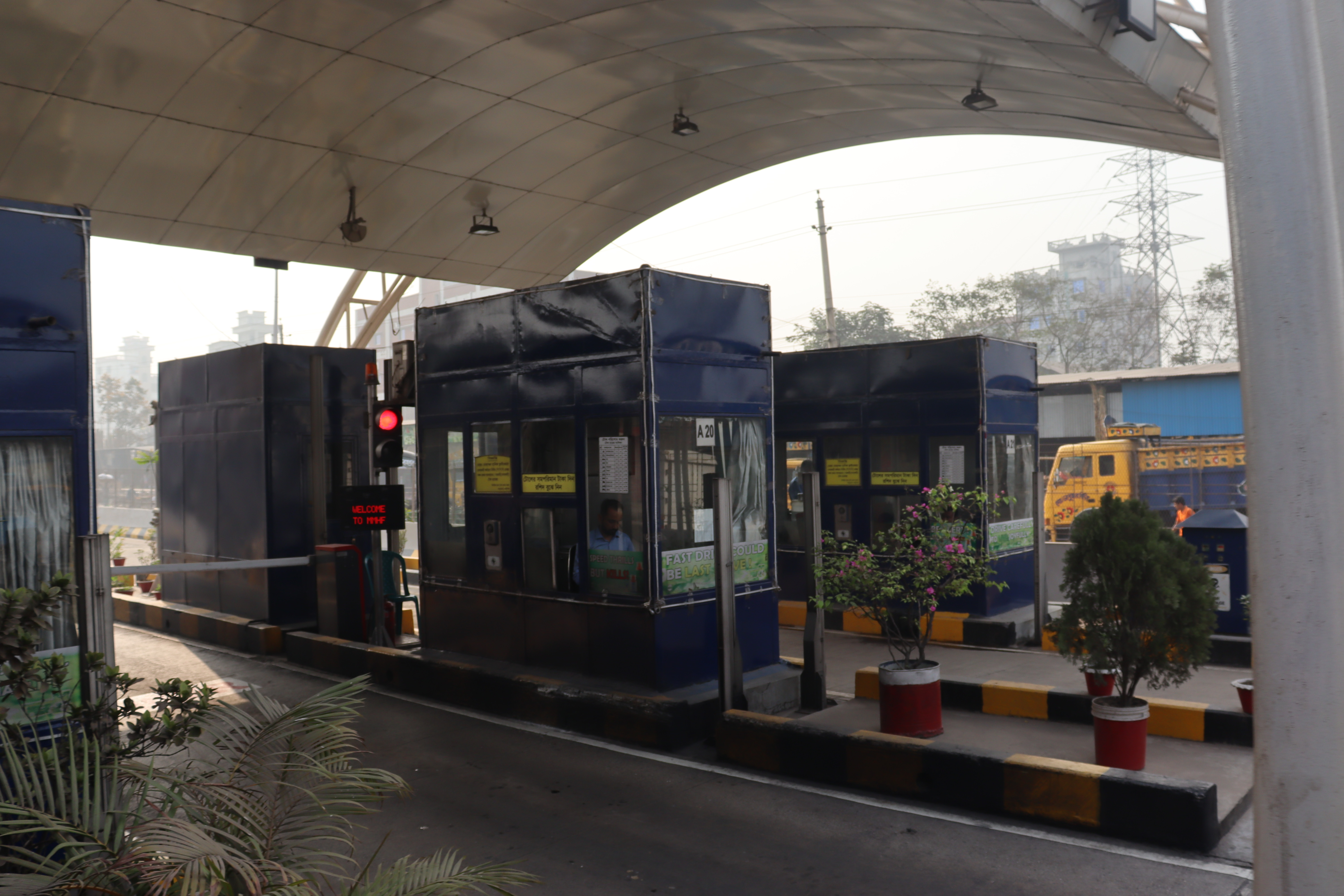
