= Jogesh Chandra Ghosh =

Bengali scholar, ayurveda practitioner and entrepreneur

- যোগেশচন্দ্র ঘোষ
- Born: 28 January 1887; Gosairhat, Bengal Presidency, British India
- Died: 4 April 1971 (aged 84); Dacca, East Pakistan
- Occupations: Scholar, Ayurveda practitioner, entrepreneur
- Known for: Martyred Intellectual
- Parent: Gopal Chandra Ghosh
- Relatives: Saudamini Dhar (sister)

Jogesh Chandra Ghosh (Bengali: যোগেশচন্দ্র ঘোষ; 1887 – 4 April 1971) was a scholar, Ayurveda practitioner, entrepreneur and philanthropist. He pioneered the use of Ayurveda in British India and founded the Ayurvedic drugstore Sadhana Aushadhalaya. In the genocide during the Bangladesh Liberation War, he was shot to death by the Pakistan Army.

== Early life ==
Ghosh was born in 1887, to lawyer Gopal Chandra Ghosh and Dakshinakali Ghosh, in Jalchhatra village in erstwhile greater Faridpur district of Bengal Presidency in British India. His birthplace is now in Gosairhat Upazila of Shariatpur District in Dhaka Division of Bangladesh. In his childhood he attended the K. L. Jubilee School in Dhaka and appeared for the entrance examination in 1902. In 1904, he passed F.A. from Jagannath College in Dhaka. In 1906, he passed BA in chemistry from Cooch Behar College in Cooch Behar. In 1908, he passed MA in chemistry from the University of Calcutta. He was a student of Acharya Prafulla Chandra Ray.

== Career ==
In 1908, he joined Bhagalpur College as a lecturer in chemistry. In 1911, he became a Fellow of the Royal Society of Chemistry. He was also a member of the American Chemical Society. In 1912, he left Bhagalpur and joined Jagannath College as a lecturer in chemistry. He was the principal of Jagannath College during 1947–48. In 1948, he retired.

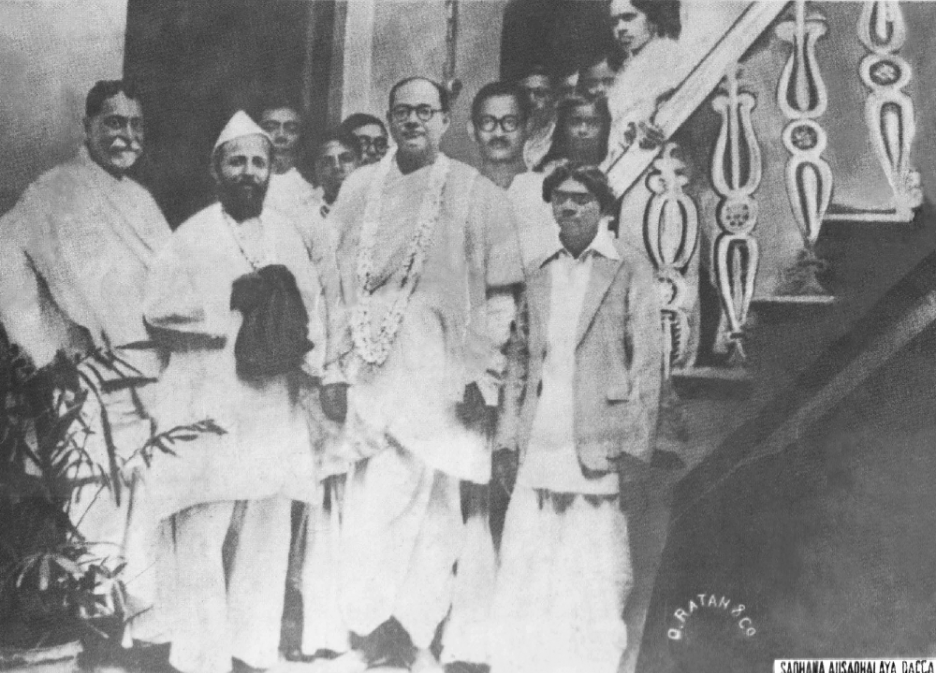
Acharya Prafulla Chandra Ray, Ashrafuddin Ahmad Chowdhury, Netaji Subhas Chandra Bose and poet Kazi Nazrul Islam at Sadhana Aushadhalaya, Gendaria, Old Dhaka, c. 1924

While at Bhagalpur, Ghosh began to take interest in Ayurveda. In 1914, he founded an Ayurvedic drugstore named Sadhana Aushadhalaya in Dhaka. The Ayurvedic medicine of Sadhana Aushadhalaya became popular and branches were opened in Bengal and other parts of British India. It also had distributing agencies in China, North America and Africa.

He established the Gopalpur Tea Company in 1913 in the memory of his late father- Gopal Chandra Ghosh. He also established the Malhuty tea estate in 1926 with the financial assistance of M/S. J. Thomas & Company, Luxmikanta tea estates in 1927 and Kadambini and Soudamini in 1930 for the Bijaynagar Tea Company Limited. The last two estates were established in memory of his two sisters, Kadambini Debi and Soudamini Debi. Kadambini Debi was the wife of Tarini Prasad Roy, the pioneer Bengali entrepreneur of Jalpaiguri town and Saudamini was the fourth Queen Consort of the Dar Raj and the wife of Raja Mohini Mohan Dhar, Judge former Dewan of the Mayurbhanj State.

== Later life ==
After retirement, Ghosh stayed in his Dhaka residence and oversaw the activities of Sadhana Aushadhalaya, located at 21 Dinanath Sen Road in Gendaria. During the 1964 East Pakistan anti-Hindu riots, he sheltered the Bengali Hindus from the neighborhood in the factory of Sadhana Aushadhalaya. Ghosh was married to Kiranbala Ghosh. They had one son and two daughters. After the liberation of Bangladesh, his son Dr. Naresh Chandra Ghosh revived the Sadhana Aushadhalaya.

=== Death ===
At the age of 84 and invalid, Ghosh refused to move. He stayed at his establishment with two guards. On 4 April, the Pakistan Army led by a Peace Committee member entered the premises of Sadhana Aushadhalaya on look out for rebels. Four Pakistan Army soldiers forced Ghosh to move upstairs in his office, where he was shot dead.

== Books ==
=== English ===
- Whither Bound Are We
- Home Treatment
- Text Book of Organic Chemistry
- Simple Geography
- Simple Arithmetic

=== Bengali ===
- Angnimandhya o Kosthaboddhota (Indigestion and constipation)
- Arogyaer Path (The path to healing)
- Griho Chikitsha (Homeopathy)
- Charmo O Sadaron Sasthya Bidhi

(Skin and general health rules)

- Chokkhu - Karno O Mukhrog Chikitsha (Treatment of eye-ear-nose and mouth diseases)
- Amra Kon Pothe (Which way are we?)
- Ayurved Itihas (History of Ayurveda)
