= Orion Group (Bangladesh) =

Bangladeshi industrial conglomerate

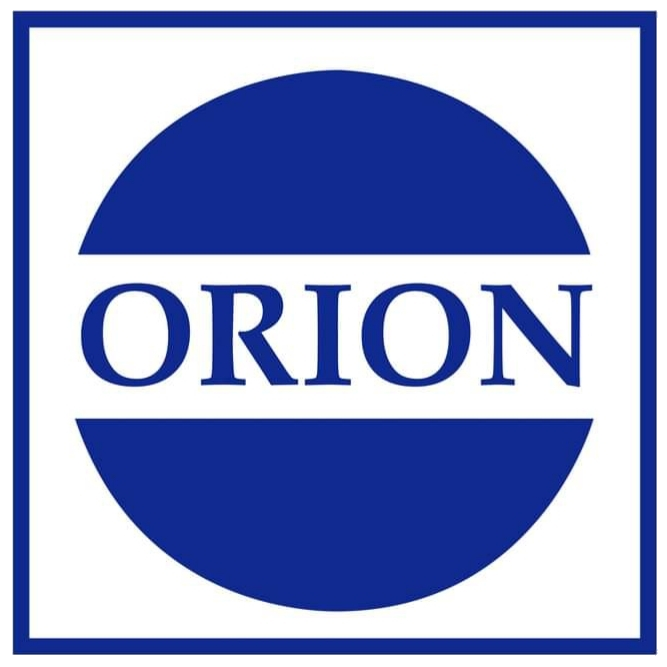
- Type: Public
- Industry: pharmaceuticals, cosmetics & toiletries, infrastructure development, real estate, engineering, power, agribusiness, hospitality, textiles, aviation
- Founded: 1985
- Headquarters: Dhaka, Bangladesh
- Revenue: ▲US$ 1B (2019)
- Number of employees: 18000
- Website: orion-group.net

Orion Group is a Bangladeshi industrial conglomerate. The group’s diverse portfolio spans pharmaceuticals (Orion Pharma), chemicals, infrastructure development, agribusiness, hospitality, textiles, and aviation. Orion was established by Obaidul Karim, the chairman of the group, and Salman Obaidul Karim, his the managing director. It built the Mayor Hanif flyover in Dhaka. The tallest building in Bangladesh, City Centre Dhaka is built by this group. The company is also the sole franchisee of Krispy Kreme and Fish & Co. restaurants in Bangladesh.

== History ==
Orion Group was established in 1985 as a pharmaceutical company. Orion Pharmaceuticals is listed on the Dhaka Stock Exchange.

Orion Group bought the state owned Kohinoor Chemical Company (BD) Ltd, a deal made possible by the close friendship of the group chairman with Prime Minister Khaleda Zia, in 1993. He was also close to Bangladesh Nationalist Party politicians Tarique Rahman and Harris Chowdhury.

In 1994, Orion Infusion Ltd, also known by its brand name Mala Chemical Industries, listed on the stock exchange. The company inflated its share prices through false information leading Bangladesh Securities and Exchange Commission to file a case against it.

Orion Group established East West Airlines in 2003. The group also operated the Bangladesh China Friendship Conference Centre. The group received the contract to build City Centre from Dhaka City Corporation through its subsidiary Belhasa Accom JV.

Bangladesh Bank had found the chairman had embezzled money from the group's bank, Oriental Bank Limited.

The anti-corruption taskforce asked for all accounts of 30 subsidiaries of Orion Group on 15 May 2007. The Anti Corruption Commission filed a case against the chairman of Orion Group, Obaidul Karim, with Gulshan Police Station. In June 2007, Karim was sentenced to 13 years for corruption. In December 2007, the chairman of Orion Group, Obaidul Karim, was sentenced to life imprisonment for embezzlement. On 12 August 2008, he was sentenced to five years imprisonment in a money laundering case.

In December 2011, Orion Group signed an agreement with Bangladesh Power Development Board to establish three coal powerplants. They would be built in Khulna, Chittagong, and Munshiganj. The total cost of the three powerplant was US$1.4 billion. The plants would be the first to be built by private companies in Bangladesh. The government would buy electricity from them for 3.7 to 5.5 taka per KWh. The group established Khulna Royal Bengals for the Bangladesh Premier League.

In September 2014, Orion Group sought permission from the government to borrow US$88 million from a Singapore-based company for Dutch-Bangla Power and Associates and Orion Power Meghnaghat. Orion Footwear started operations on 29 December led by chief executive officer Ruhul Amin Molla.

The managing director of Orion Group, Salman Karim, said that their plan to establish a LPG plant was delayed by five months due to political instability in March 2015.

In May 2016, Orion Group signed an agreement with Bangladesh Power Development Board to establish a coal powerplant in Munshiganj by its subsidiary Orion Power Unit-2 Dhaka Limited. It will sell the power for 6.69 taka per KWh. It held a public meeting to discuss the plant with stakeholders in Narayanganj near the site of Orion Power Meghnaghat Limited. Orion Group bought Krispy Kreme to Bangladesh as the official franchise. It also bought the Singapore-based Fish & Co. to Bangladesh.

In October 2020, Orion Group sought about one billion USD loan from the forex reserve of Bangladesh.

On 24 May 2021, Justices M Enayetur Rahim and Sardar Md Rashed Jahangir halted an order of Bangladesh Bank to list the chairman of Orion Group as a loan defaulter for loans taken under Amar Desh Publications Limited, partly owned by Orion Group.

On 19 September 2024, Orion Group filed a defamation case against local news-oriented television channel Independent Television, accusing the channel of constantly airing misleading reports on the conglomerate allegedly embezzling governmental funds and laundering money.

== Subsidiaries ==
- Orion Pharma Limited
- Pharma Park
- Jatrabari–Gulistan Flyover
- Orion Power Meghnaghat Limited
- Dutch Bangla Power and Associates Limited
- Digital Power and Associates Limited
- Orion Power Dhaka Limited
- Orion Power Dhaka Unit-2 Limited
- Orion Power Rupsha Limited
- Orion power Sonargaon Limited
- Orion Gas Limited
- Orion Oil and Shipping Limited
- City Centre
- Interior Accom Consortium Limited
- Jafflong Tea Company Limited
- Panbo Bangla Mushroom Limited
- Orion Agro Products Limited
- Noakhali Gold Foods Limited
- Kohinoor Chemical Company (BD) Ltd
- Orion Knit Textiles Limited
- Orion Footwear Limited
- Orion Home Appliance Limited
- Orion Games Limited
- Orion Consumer Products Limited
- Global Shoes Limited
- Amardesh Publications Limited (publisher of Amar Desh)
- Prudential Securities Limited
- Khulna Royal Bengals
- The Business Standard

== See also ==
- List of companies of Bangladesh
- Orion Pharma Ltd.
