= Shwapno =

Retail supermarket chain in Bangladesh

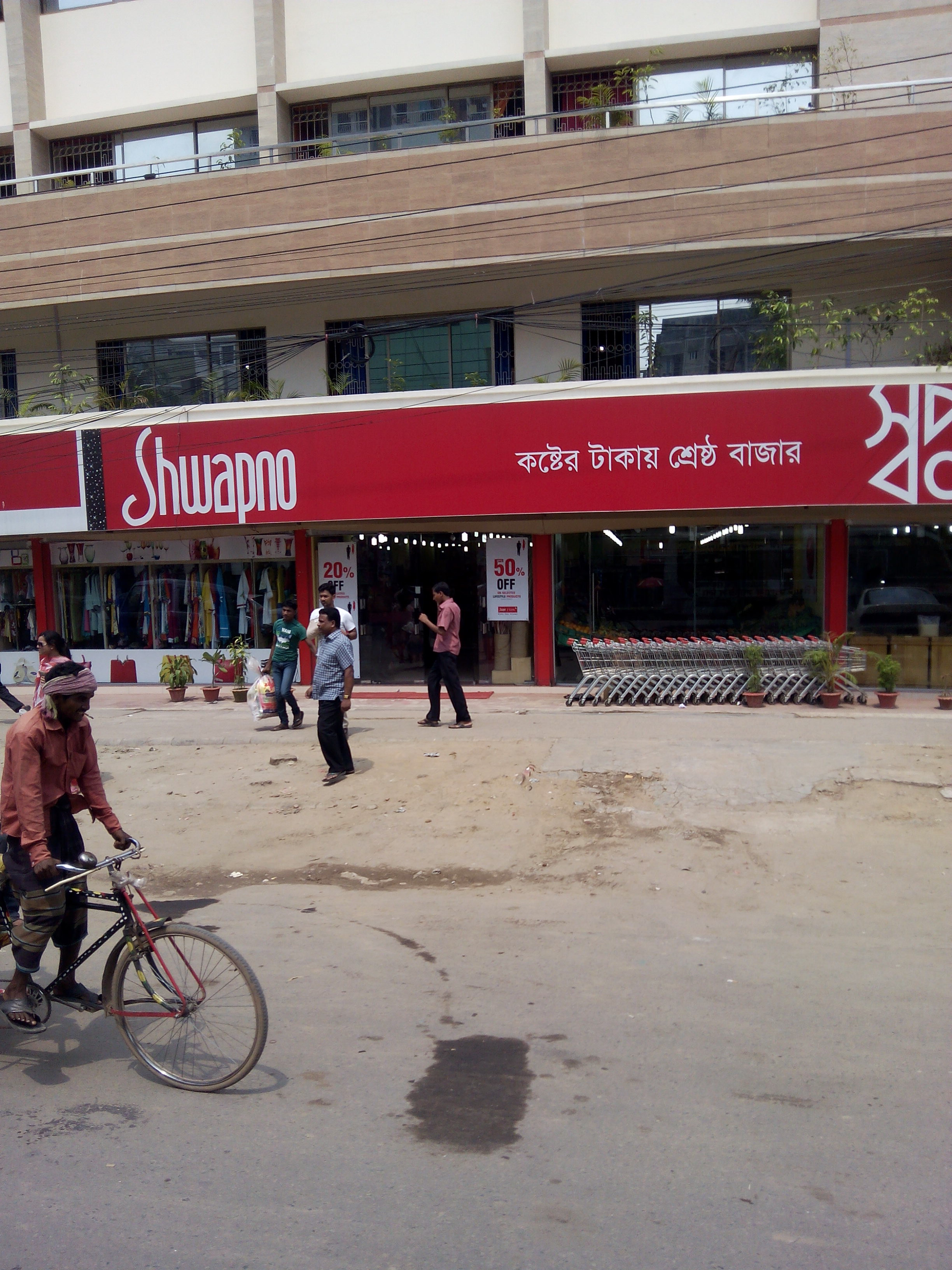
- An outlet of Shwapno in Dhaka
- Type: Subsidiary
- Industry: Retail; Supermarket
- Founded: 2008; 18 years ago
- Founder: ACI Limited
- Headquarters: Dhaka, Bangladesh
- Area served: Countrywide in Bangladesh
- Products: Grocery, Household items, Personal care products, and many more
- Services: Supermarket; E-commerce; Teleservice
- Revenue: ▲৳1,389 Crore (2022)
- Operating income: ▲৳94.9 Lakh (2021)
- Net income: ▲৳6 crore+ (2022)
- Number of employees: 4,300 (2021)
- Parent: ACI Limited
- Website: shwapno.com

Shwapno (Bengali: স্বপ্ন, romanized: Śôpno, pronounced [ʃɔpˈno], transl. Dream) is a Bangladeshi supermarket chain owned by ACI Logistics Limited, a subsidiary of ACI Limited. It was established in 2008 and has become the largest supermarket chain in Bangladesh, with the highest number of outlets and a 44% market share in the Super Shop sector in Bangladesh.

== History ==
Shwapno was founded in 2008 by ACI Limited. The company uses big data and the Internet of things (IoT) to track inventory, manage supply chains, and provide personalised recommendations to customers.

The first outlet of this company was located in Wari, Old Dhaka, named Fresh'n'Near. The outlets' sizes of Shwapno were from around 27 to 65 square meters in this year.

In May 2010, Shwapno planned to establish 500 outlets in 70 countries by 2015 but by October 2010, the company stopped this expansion.

By 2012, Shwapno had 30 outlets in Dhaka city, the highest number of outlets of any supermarket chain there.

In June 2016, Shwapno was fined for selling rotten meat and fish, as well as selling products at higher prices.

In 2017, the company claimed that it was the first South Asian retailer to operate in accordance with the GLOBALG.A.P (Good Agricultural Practices) certification standards. In April of this year, the company started online sales as an E-commerce in Bangladesh.

In May 2018, Shwapno faced penalties for the sale of expired food items, tampering with weights, and maintaining unclean storage conditions for food products.

In August 2018, Shwapno launched Shuddo, a chemical-free vegetable brand.

In July 2019, Shwapno outlet in Dhaka was fined by the Directorate of National Consumers' Right Protection (DNCRP) for selling items at higher prices and for not displaying the date of production or maximum selling price on the labels.

In April 2020, Foodpanda and Shwapno partnered to launch an on-demand grocery delivery service in Bangladesh.

In February 2022, Shwapno became the first member of GLOBALG.A.P in the retail chain of the South-East Asian zone.

In March 2023, Shwapno had around 300 outlets countrywide with 58 districts in Bangladesh and plans to expand its outlet by 10 times to 3000 within 2028.

In a report published on 23 April 2023, The Daily Star, one of Bangladesh's prominent daily newspapers stated, Swapno has lost in an around 1,600cr in 15 years, due to increasing cost.
