= Mimi Chocolate =

Brand of chocolate bar

- Packet of Mimi chocolate bar orange flavour
- Product type: Confectionery
- Current owner: Mimi Chocolate Ltd.
- Country: Bangladesh
- Introduced: 1965; 61 years ago
- Discontinued: 2018
- Markets: National

Mimi Chocolate was a Bangladeshi brand of chocolate bar and chewing gum manufactured by Mimi Chocolate Ltd. It was introduced in Bangladesh in 1965. The company's chocolate products were first available in the country, so Mimi Chocolate was the first chocolate brand in Bangladesh. It had monopoly market in chocolate bar industry of Bangladesh.

== History ==
It was established on 4046.856 square meter industrial plot. After the independence of Bangladesh, Bangladesh Freedom Fighter Welfare Trust acquired Mimi Chocolate Limited which was situated in Tejgaon Industrial Area. Mimi Chocolate was successful in business because in that time there was a few chocolate brand in Bangladesh. There was less chance to import foreign chocolate products. That's why for 18 years Mimi Chocolate was popular chocolate brand. In 1990s, Mimi used to sell chocolate bars and chewing gum with an annual value of at least Tk 6 crore.

== Product ==
As products, Mimi sold chocolate bars and chewing gum. The chocolate bars were packaged in brown paper.

There were two flavours of Mimi chocolate bar:

- Milk flavour
- Orange flavour

== Advertising ==
A TV commercial of Mimi Chocolate was broadcast in BTV, which was the only television of that time. The promotional activity of Mimi Chocolate was quite weak. They did not intensify their promotional activities because of less competitors.

== Discontinuation ==
17 years later, the company started to collapse due to many issues. The difference between the price of the product and its cost gradually decreases for its outdated machines. In 2000 its difference went to highest point. In 2009, Its operational activities were stopped but opened again. But it couldn’t cope up with competitors and solve its issues. In 2018, Mimi Chocolate Limited was closed permanently.

== See also ==
- List of chocolate bar brands
