= Pragoti =

Bangladeshi car manufacturer

Pragoti Industries Limited
- Type: State Run
- Industry: Automotive
- Founded: 1966; 60 years ago
- Headquarters: Agrabad Commercial Area, Chittagong, Bangladesh
- Key people: Md. Abul Khayer Sardar, MD
- Products: Car Assembling, Automotive Parts
- Net income: ▲US$9 million (2019)
- Number of employees: 350
- Parent: Bangladesh Steel and Engineering Corporation
- Website: pragotiindustries.gov.bd

Pragoti Industries Limited (PIL) is a Bangladeshi car assembling and car parts manufacturing company headquartered in Chittagong with a manufacturing plant in Barabkunda. Founded in 1966, it is the country's largest car assembling plant and it has assembled and marketed more than 50,000 vehicles such as cars, SUVs, buses, trucks, pickups, ambulances, tractors of multiple models by importing CKD (Complete Knocked Down) kits from overseas.

== History ==
=== 1960s ===
Present Pragoti Industries was established in 1966 as Ghandhara Industries by Habibullah Khan Khattak, a pasthun and a retired army Lieutenant General from Pakistan Army. He established Pragati (then Ghandhara Industries) with joint venture with General Motors. In late 60's Pragati rolled out Vauxhall Viva cars and Bedford trucks. Habibullah also set up a factory at Karachi, but Pragati or Ghandhara Industries was more advanced and larger. Gen Habibullah's son, Maj Ali Quli Khan flew out of Dhaka during end of independence of Bangladesh. Upon independence of Bangladesh, the government nationalised the company and renamed it Pragoti Industries.

=== 1970s ===
Progoti Industries continued assembling Vauxhall Viva cars, a luxurious sedan car of that time and showed in Asia 1972 Trade fair in with caption " Bangladesh produce quality".

=== 1980s ===
Things decline since 1980s and no more assembling were taking part only joining CKD for large vehicles.

=== 2010s ===
However, in 2010, Japanese car giant Mitsubishi Corporation led by Asia Regional Manager Kazuhide Ogata made a formal proposal to Bangladesh government to manufacture Mitsubishi Lancer Sedan and Mitsubishi Pajero Sport in Pragoti, which already has been assembling Mitsubishi Pajero Sport since last few years. Along with Pajero Sport, it also assembles Tata Motors buses and mini trucks, Ashok Leyland minibuses. Due to cheap labour cost, the company officials hoping to reduce the price of cars that will be built here are heavily comparing the same cars manufactured elsewhere.

On 12 May 2016 Pragoti industries Ltd (PIL) & Mahindra and Mahindra Ltd (M&M) India, carried out factory roll-out of Mahindra Scorpio S10 SUV & Scorpio Double Cab pick-up CKD vehicles in Bangladesh was done in presence of Mr. Imtiaz Chaudhary, Chairman, BSEC, MD & Country Manager M&M Mr. Pankaj Singh . These vehicles will be marketed in Bangladesh through PIL.

== See also ==
- Mahindra & Mahindra
- Rangs Group
- Bangladesh Machine Tools Factory
- List of companies of Bangladesh
