= BCIC College =

Bangladeshi college

- বিসিআইসি কলেজ
- Seal of BCIC College

Location
- Zoo Road, Mirpur, Dhaka - 1216, Bangladesh; Dhaka, Bangladesh; 23.8106°N 90.3485°E

Information
- Type: Higher Secondary school
- Motto: At the pinnacle of excellence in deep conviction (দীপ্ত প্রত্যয়ে উৎকর্ষের শিখরে)
- Established: January 1, 1991; 35 years ago
- Sister school: BCIC School
- School district: Dhaka
- Director: Mohammad Kamruzzaman
- Principal: Col Dr. Md Moksed Ali
- Gender: Male and Female
- Enrollment: 1000+
- Capacity: 1100
- Average class size: 60
- Language: Bangla
- Campuses: BCIC School Campus; BCIC Collage Campus
- Campus size: College: 5.16 acres (2.09 ha)
- Campus type: Urban
- Colors: Boys: White (Shirt); Navy Blue (Pant); Girls: White (Salwar); Navy Blue (Kameez)
- Sports: Football, basketball, cricket, volleyball, badminton, handball, table tennis
- Accreditation: Dhaka Education Board
- National ranking: 43rd (based on Board Exam Results)
- Affiliation: Bangladesh Chemical Industries Corporation
- Demonym: BCICian
- Website: bciccollege.edu.bd

Bangladesh Chemical Industries Corporation College, BCIC College, is a semi-public higher secondary educational institution in Dhaka, Bangladesh. It is situated at Mirpur near the National Zoo of Bangladesh. Bangladesh Chemical Industries Corporation operates the institution.

== History ==
BCIC College embarked on its educational journey with the initiation of its school section in 1983. Subsequently, the science, business studies, and humanities groups within the college section commenced their academic operations in 1991, 1996, and 1997, respectively. Originally established to cater to the higher education needs of the children of Bangladesh Chemical Industries Corporation employees, the institution extended its admission opportunities to external candidates over time.

While maintaining its commitment to the employee's children, the college introduced a quota system, allowing them to apply for scholarships or benefit from reduced monthly fees. Functioning as a charter school, BCIC College receives financial support from the government of Bangladesh, covering half of its operational expenses.

== Students ==
Every year BCIC College admits around 400 students in science, around 240 students in humanities and around 240 students in business studies group through online application. Currently, it consists of 20 sections for students in science, commerce and humanities terming each as "Groups". In science, female students are in groups S1 to S4, and male students are in groups S5 to S8. For humanities, females are in group H1,H2 and males are in group H3,H4. In business studies, female students are in groups C1 to C3, while male students are in groups C4 to C6.

== Co-curricular activities ==
BCIC College has many successes in co-curricular activities. The institution participates in various inter-school and inter-college competitions across the whole Dhaka city. The college has won prizes in different categories in the competitions of National Education Week, National drama Competition In NDC, EEE Day, 1st National Television Debate, Math Olympiad and Science project including Victory Flower. The institution consists 4 Houses which can be indicated in badge colors:

1. Shahjalal House 2. Karnaphuli House 3. Ashuganj House 4. Jamuna House. The houses plays against each other in the college's annual sports program. There is a captain and vice-captain for each house, as well as for the entire college.

House Name	Badge Color
Shahjalal House	Crimson
Jamuna House	Sky Blue
Karnaphuli House	Parrot Green
Ashuganj House	Red
