= Eastern Cables Limited =

Bangladesh state-owned telecom equipment supplier

- Traded as: DSE: ECABLES; CSE: ECABLES
- Founded: 1967; 58 years ago
- Headquarters: Chittagong, Bangladesh
- Area served: Bangladesh
- Key people: Shahidul Hoque Bhuia ndc (chairman); Md. Abul Kalam Azad (managing director)
- Parent: Bangladesh Steel and Engineering Corporation
- Website: www.easterncables.gov.bd

Eastern Cables Limited (Bengali: ইস্টার্ন কেবলস লিঃ) is a Bangladesh government owned telecom equipment and wire manufacturing company. Eastern Cables is the largest manufacturer of cables and conductors in Bangladesh. Md. Shahidul Hoque Bhuia ndc is the chairman and Md.Abul Kalam Azad is the managing director of Eastern Cables. It is a subsidiary of Bangladesh Steel and Engineering Corporation.

== History ==
Eastern Cables Limited was established in 1967 in Patenga, Chittagong and commercial production began on 1 March 1971. It was listed in the stock exchange in 1986. In 2008, Bangladesh governments attempts to privatize Atlas Bangladesh, Eastern Cables, National Tubes, and Usmania Glass Sheet Factory were stopped after employees of companies challenged the decision in court.

In May 2018, Dhaka Stock Exchange downgraded the Eastern Cables Limited company from "A" category shares to "Z" category shares for failure to hold regular Annual General Meeting. The same month BRB Cable Industries Limited, a private cable manufacture, bought 30 percent of the shares of Eastern Cable from the stock market despite attempts by the Ministry of Industries to stop the sale. The Ministry of Industries asked Bangladesh Securities and Exchange Commission to prevent BRB cables from taking a director seat in the company as they identified BRB cables as a competitor. The government of Bangladesh owns 51 percent of the share while the rest are in the capital market.

From 2018 to 2019, the earnings of Eastern Cable were down 229 percent.
