= BEXIMCO =

Bangladeshi multinational company

Bangladesh Export Import Company Limited
- Type: Public
- Traded as: DSE: BEXIMCO; CSE: BEXIMCO
- Industry: Conglomerate
- Founded: 1972; 54 years ago
- Founders: A. S. F. Rahman; Salman F Rahman
- Headquarters: Dhaka, Bangladesh
- Area served: Worldwide
- Key people: A. S. F. Rahman (Chairman); Salman F Rahman (Vice Chairman)
- Products: Diversified investments; Banking & finance; Pharmaceutical; Garment manufacturing; Clothing retail; Media; IT
- Revenue: ▲BD৳25.387 billion (US$304 million) (FY2018)
- Operating income: ▲BD৳7.085 billion (US$85 million) (FY2018)
- Net income: ▲BD৳1.259 billion (US$15 million) (FY2018)
- Total assets: ▲BD৳122.746 billion (US$1.47 billion) (FY2018)
- Total equity: ▲BD৳63.373 billion (US$757 million) (FY2018)
- Owner: A. S. F. Rahman; Salman F Rahman
- Number of employees: 70,000
- Subsidiaries: Beximco Pharma; Yellow; Independent Television
- Website: beximco.com bol-online.com beximcolpg.com

Bangladesh Export Import Company Limited (Bengali: বাংলাদেশ এক্সপোর্ট ইমপোর্ট কোম্পানি লিমিটেড), commonly known by its trade name BEXIMCO (Bengali: বেক্সিমকো), is a Bangladeshi multinational conglomerate holding company headquartered in Dhaka, Bangladesh. It was founded in the early 1970s.

BEXIMCO has diversified operations and investments across multiple industries, including textiles, pharmaceuticals, personal protective equipment (PPE), ceramics, real estate development, construction, trading, marine food, information and communication technologies (ICT), media, financial services, and energy. BEXIMCO's subsidiaries export products to 55 countries worldwide. It has retail outlets in South Asia and Eastern Europe. It was one of the largest private sector employers in Bangladesh, with over 70,000 people worldwide, until it laid off 30,000 employees (nearly 75% of its workforce) in December 2024 due to lack of orders and banking support. It also suffered a Tk 1.13 billion loss in the July–September 2024 quarter.

Beximco Pharma, the group's pharmaceutical producer, was the first Bangladeshi company to be listed on the London Stock Exchange.

== History ==
The company was founded by brothers A. S. F. Rahman and Salman F Rahman in 1972, right after the independence of Bangladesh. Their family was earlier engaged in the jute business. The jute factory was nationalized in the early 1970s. However, with free-market reforms in the late 1970s and 1980s, the family regained many of their businesses.

Since the early 1970s, BEXIMCO has been a pioneer in industrial and business sectors. Currently, it has operations and investments across a wide range of industries, including pharmaceuticals, ceramics, renewable energy, textiles, LPG, food & beverage, satellite-to-home television, PPE, media, ICT, real estate, financial services, and travel & tourism.

In 2005, Beximco Pharma became the first Bangladeshi company to be listed on the Alternative Investment Market of the London Stock Exchange. BEXIMCO also opened its first overseas retail outlet with the launch of the Yellow clothing brand in Karachi, Pakistan. Yellow has since expanded to several Bangladeshi and Pakistani cities. In 2009, Shinepukur Ceramics opened a showroom in Moscow, Russia. In 2010, the company acquired stakes in several major Bangladeshi businesses, including IFIC Bank and Unique Hotels and Resorts.

In October 2021, BEXIMCO, along with two other companies, Robi and Meghna Petroleum, donated 6.93cr to Labour Welfare Fund support to workers in the formal and informal sectors for accidental deaths, treatment of injuries, incurable diseases, and also for the higher education of their children.

In 2023, BEXIMCO Group inaugurated Teesta Solar Limited. However, the plant started supplying power to the national grid in December 2022. The plant has 520,000 solar panels at 600 acres of land at Tarapur Union. The plant has the capacity to produce 200MW of electricity. The plant is located on the bank of the Teesta River.

Its vice chairman, Salman F Rahman, was serving as a Private Sector Development Affairs Adviser to Prime Minister and Bangladesh Awami League President Sheikh Hasina, the former Prime Minister of Bangladesh, in the past and as Private Sector Industry and Investment Adviser at the moment. He's now currently arrested as they were attempting to flee by waterway from the Sadarghat area of the capital on Tuesday, 13 August 2024. They are currently charged as instigators of the murder of students during the student rising movement in Dhaka.

In the wake of political turmoil following the fall of the Awami League government in August 2024, Salman F Rahman, the founder of Beximco Pharmaceuticals and former private industry and investment adviser to former Prime Minister Sheikh Hasina, was imprisoned. The period of instability, marked by a student-led mass uprising in July and August 2024 led to significant financial difficulties for Beximco Group. On 5 September 2024, the High Court of Bangladesh directed the appointment of a receiver to oversee all institutions of Beximco Group. This decision was made to manage the company's financial issues and ensure the stability of its operations. This decision was upheld by the chamber judge of the Appellate Division on 1 October 2024, with a full hearing scheduled for 28 October 2024. During the hearing, the decision was deferred, and the case was adjourned until 11 November 2024. As the Supreme Court prepared to issue its decision on the receiver's appointment, Beximco Pharmaceuticals requested a temporary suspension of trading in its shares due to the prevailing uncertainty.

== Management ==
Salman F. Rahman served as the vice chairman of BEXIMCO Group until his arrest on 13 August 2024. He is currently under investigation for several allegations, including foreign currency smuggling, bank loan embezzlement, illegal wealth accumulation, and share market fraud. On 19 September 2024, the High Court of Bangladesh instructed the Central Bank to appoint a receiver to manage the company's operations and oversee all its assets.

The High Court of Bangladesh appointed Ruhul Amin, the executive director of Bangladesh Bank, as the receiver for Beximco Group. His role is to manage the company's operations and assets, ensuring stability and continuity during this period of financial difficulty. Bangladesh Bank Governor Ahsan H Mansur emphasized that the receivership is not meant to stall Beximco but to keep it operational. The central bank's approval came after several months of financial instability within the conglomerate, which led to unpaid wages and protests by workers. The High Court's order also includes recovering funds obtained by Salman F Rahman, the founder of Beximco Pharmaceuticals, from different banks and bringing the money back to Bangladesh.

Ruhul Amin's role as the receiver is to protect the interests of the company's employees and the country, ensuring proper management of all institutions under Beximco Group.

== Products ==
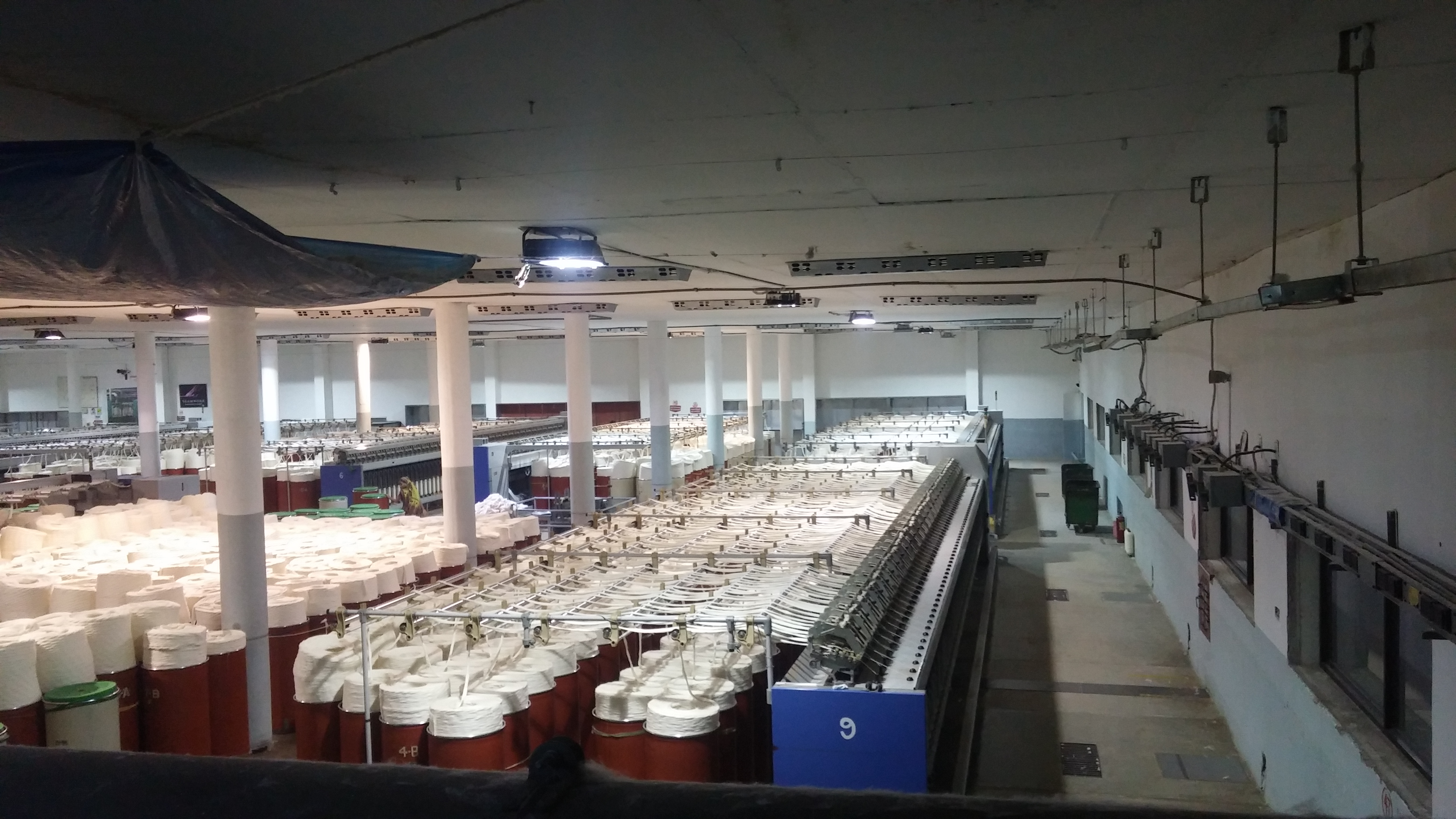
Beximco Industrial Park

- Banking - IFIC Bank
- Ceramic
- Construction
- Electric power generation
- Fashion
- Fisheries
- Food & beverage
- Hotels
- Information technology
- Media
- Petroleum products
- Pharmaceuticals
- PPE
- Private satellite television channel
- Real estate
- Renewable energy
- Sports team & franchise
- Textiles
- Travel & tourism

== Subsidiaries ==
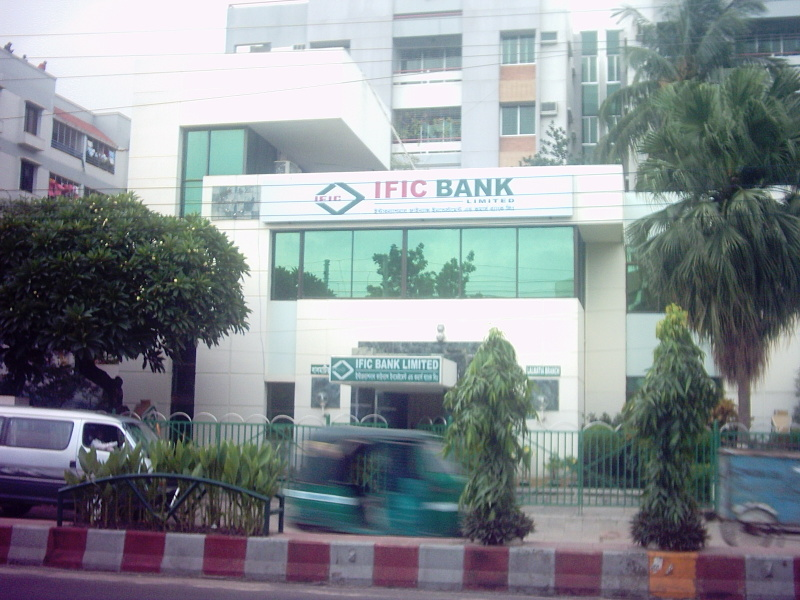
A branch of IFIC Bank. Beximco is the single largest stakeholder in the bank, which is one of Bangladesh's largest.

The conglomerate comprises four publicly traded and eight privately held companies.

- Bangladesh Export Import Co. Ltd. (public)
- Beximco Pharma (public)
- Beximco Computers Ltd.
- Beximco Engineering Ltd.
- Beximco Aviation Limited
- Beximco Petroleum Ltd.
- Beximco Power Company Ltd.
- Giga Tech Ltd.
- Independent Television
- Shinepukur Ceramics (public)
- Yellow
- IFIC Bank
- BEXTRADE
- Dhaka Dynamites (from 2015–2018)

=== Akash Digital TV ===
Akash Digital TV
- Native name: আকাশ ডিজিটাল টিভি
- Type: Subsidiary
- Industry: Satellite television
- Predecessor: RealVU
- Founded: 2016; 10 years ago (Original RealVU); 19 May 2019; 7 years ago (Akash DTH)
- Headquarters: Gulshan, Dhaka, Bangladesh
- Area served: Bangladesh
- Products: Direct broadcast satellite
- Owner: BEXIMCO
- Parent: Beximco Communications Limited
- Website: akashdth.com

Akash Digital TV, or Akash DTH, formally incorporated as RealVU DTH, is the sole direct broadcast satellite television provider to households in Bangladesh, operated by Beximco Communications Limited, and owned by parent company BEXIMCO. It broadcasts multichannel TV services via satellite Bangladesh-1. It also offers personal video recording (PVR) capabilities and HD support. Akash has a monopoly in areas where cable providers can't reach.

==== History ====
In 2014, the Bangladesh government gave license to operate digital service to RealVu (now Akash Digital TV or Akash DTH) and Bengal Digital.

RealVU DTH began broadcasting in 2016 on ABS-2 at 75 degrees east as a joint venture with GS group. The owner of the provider is BEXIMCO via Beximco Communications Limited. The early years of the company were unstable due to technical and financial difficulties. RealVU DTH failed to capture the market, and postponed its services within a years.

In 2017, GS group sold their share in Beximco Communications(holding company of RealVu and now Akash) but continued providing hardware and software for the service.

In 2019, they came back with a rebranded name, Akash DTH.

From 2019, Akash DTH has been providing television services to customers using Bangladesh-1 satellite. The company broadcasts more than 120 television stations from around the world, along with exclusive Bangladeshi channels. In 2021, Akash DTH started offering its customers the first PVR in Bangladesh. They also rebranded the name to Akash Digital TV.

In July 2024, Akash Digital TV partnered with Tata Play to launch Akash Go, a portable app for viewing on the go. In 2026, Akash Go OTT app was launched.

==== Financial situation ====
The company got a fee waiver of ৳111.56M due to losses from May 2019 to 2020 on grounds of financial losses despite having a monopoly in the DTH market in Bangladesh. But a spectrum charge waiver over the next five years was denied.

==== Marketing ====
Customers of analog cable system were switching to digital cable system such as Bengal Digital, Jadoo Digital and DTH system such as Akash DTH for its superior picture quality. While the market penetration remained low, the market share of Akash DTH was growing. Akash DTH used multiple types of marketing such as TV marketing, guerilla marketing, word of mouth and viral marketing.

== See also ==
- Dhaka Dynamites
- Shinepukur Cricket Club
- List of companies of Bangladesh
- Abahani LTD
