= Orion Pharma Ltd. =

- Type: Ltd
- Industry: Pharmaceutical
- Founded: 1965; 61 years ago
- Headquarters: Dhaka, Bangladesh
- Area served: Asia, Africa, Europe
- Website: orionpharmabd.com

Orion Pharma is a pharmaceuticals company in Bangladesh. It is part of the Orion group. It was founded in 1965.

== History ==
Before January 2011 Orion Pharmacy was called Orion laboratories. In 2013 Orion Pharma went public by floating its shares in the Dhaka Stock Exchange. It had submitted its IPO prospectus in 2011 to regulators. From 2016 Orion started to offer 20 medical scholarship as part of its corporate social responsibility. In February 2017 it borrowed 34 million dollar from the German BHF-Bank to finance expansion.
