= Eastern Tubes Limited =

Lighting manufacturer in Bangladesh

- Formation: 1964
- Headquarters: Dhaka, Bangladesh
- Region served: Bangladesh
- Official language: Bengali
- Website: Eastern Tubes Limited

Eastern Tubes Limited (Bengali: ইস্টার্ন টিউবস লিঃ) is a Bangladesh government owned lighting manufacturer.

== History ==
Eastern Tubes Limited was established on 23 October 1964 in Tejgaon Industrial Area, Dhaka. It received technical assistance from Toshiba Corporation of Japan. In 1970, it was a subsidiary of Latif Bawany Jute Mills. After the Independence of Bangladesh, the company was declared abandoned and nationalised by the Government of Bangladesh in 1972. It is owned and operated by Bangladesh Steel and Engineering Corporation under the Ministry of Industries.

The company enjoyed monopoly status in the fluorescent market till 1992, when the market was opened. The company failed to adapt to the free market and revenue declined.

In 2011, Eastern Tubes Limited announced plans to introduce the manufacturing fluorescent lamps. In 2020, Eastern Tubes Limited announced plans to build LED light bulbs with technical assistance from Harmanikom Limited, a South Korean company, at its Tejgaon facility.
