= Beximco Pharma =

Pharmaceutical company in Bangladesh

Beximco Pharmaceuticals Ltd
- Type: Limited
- Traded as: DSE: BXPHARMA
- Industry: Pharmaceutical
- Founded: 1980
- Headquarters: Dhanmondi, Dhaka, Bangladesh
- Key people: Iqbal Ahmed (Managing Director)
- Revenue: ▲ ৳3926.7 crore (US$320 million) (2023)
- Operating income: ▲ ৳691.2 crore (US$56 million) (2023)
- Net income: ▼ ৳461.4 crore (US$38 million) (2023)
- Number of employees: 4,523 (2019)
- Website: Official Website

Beximco Pharmaceuticals Ltd, also known as Beximco Pharma (stylised as BEXIMCO PHARMA) is a Bangladeshi multinational pharmaceutical company. It is a part of Bangladesh Export Import Company Limited (BEXIMCO).

== History ==
Beximco Pharma was founded in 1976 and started operations in 1980, manufacturing products under the licenses of Bayer AG of Germany and Upjohn Inc. of United States. Today, Beximco Pharma manufactures and markets its own branded generics for several diseases including AIDS, cancer, asthma, hypertension, and diabetes for both national and international markets. It was the first drug company from Bangladesh to sell its products in the US.

In May 2020, the company introduced the world's first generic remdesivir for COVID-19 treatment. Beximco Pharma became the first company to obtain production and marketing authorization for molnupiravir, the first and only specific oral anti-covid drug in Bangladesh along with Eskayef Pharmaceuticals. Beximco Pharma's branded generic version of molnupiravir is being marketed as Emorivir.

== Factories ==
Beximco Pharma manufacturing facilities are spread across a 20-acre (81,000 m^{2}) site located in Dhaka, Bangladesh. The facilities consist of a number of purpose-built plants, including a new Oral Solid Dosage (OSD) plant. The site includes manufacturing facilities as well as a research laboratory and a number of warehouses. The plant and machinery of the facilities were designed, produced and installed by partners from Germany, Switzerland, Sweden, Italy and the United Kingdom, amongst others.

== Exports ==
In August 2007, Beximco exported its medicines to the Philippines, the 5th country of the 10-member Association of South East Asian Nations (ASEAN) to import Beximco's drugs.
