= Gazi Wires Limited =

Bangladesh state owned wire company

- Formation: 1972
- Headquarters: Chittagong, Bangladesh
- Region served: Bangladesh
- Official language: Bengali
- Website: www.gaziwires.gov.bd

Gazi Wires Limited (Bengali: গাজী ওয়্যারস্ লিঃ) is a Bangladesh government owned company that manufactures wiring, for example copper wires. It is a subsidiary of Bangladesh Steel and Engineering Corporation. Md. Shahidul Hoque Bhuia ndc, chairman of Bangladesh Steel and Engineering Corporation, is the chairman of Gazi Wires. Eng Sabbir Awal is the managing director of Gazi Wires.

== History ==
Gazi Wires Limited was established in 1965 with technical assistance from Furukawa Electric company based in Japan. After the Independence of Bangladesh, Gazi Wires was nationalised in 1972 by the Government of Bangladesh. It was placed under the management of Bangladesh Steel and Engineering Corporation. Gazi wires produces various types of copper wires. The factory Gazi wires was heavily damaged by the 1991 Bangladesh cyclone and subsequent flooding.

In 2016, Gazi Wires Limited was awarded the National Productivity and Quality Excellence Award. In October 2018, the executive committee of the National Economic Council approved 689 million taka allotment for the mordernisation of Gazi Wires. From 2014 to 2020, Gazi Wires limited has turned profit for the government of Bangladesh. The Ministry of Industries, per instructions from the then Prime Minister Sheikh Hasina, asked all government agencies and organisations to purchase supplies from state-owned companies like Gazi Wires Limited.
