= Bangladesh Blade Factory Limited =

Bangladeshi government-owned manufacturing company

- Formation: 1985
- Headquarters: Dhaka, Bangladesh
- Region served: Bangladesh
- Official language: Bengali
- Website: www.bbfl.gov.bd

Bangladesh Blade Factory Limited (Bengali: বাংলাদেশ ব্লেড ফ্যাক্টরী লিঃ) is a Bangladesh government owned company, under the Bangladesh Steel and Engineering Corporation, that manufactures razor blades. Md. Touhiduzzaman is the managing director.

== History ==
In 1976, the Government of Bangladesh proposed an agreement with the proprietors of Wilkinson Sword, based in the United Kingdom, to establish a blade manufacturing factory in Bangladesh. In 1979, Bangladesh Steel and Engineering Corporation passed the agreement for approval to the Ministry of Industry. After approval from the Planning Commission the construction of the factory began in 1980. The factory started commercial production in 1985.

In the 1980s, the company had one of the biggest shares of the double edged safety blade market in Bangladesh. Its market share declined after 2000 when private companies entered the market. Since then production and revenue have declined for the company as well. In the 2013-2014 financial year it produced 76 million blades but that number declined to 47 million by 2019. The Centre for Policy Dialogue recommended that the government close down the factory due to the large number of private producers. They also recommended that the government turn the factory lot into an industrial park with Bangladesh Economic Zones Authority.

Bangladesh government announced plans to off load shares of the company on the Dhaka Stock Exchange in 2010. By 2011, there some difficulties in off loading the shares. In December 2018, Bangladesh government announced plans to modernize Bangladesh Blade Factory Limited.
