= Bangladesh Municipal Development Fund =

Funds local government in urban areas

- Formation: 2002
- Headquarters: Dhaka, Bangladesh
- Region served: Bangladesh
- Official language: Bengali
- Website: bmdf.portal.gov.bd

Bangladesh Municipal Development Fund is a Bangladesh government fund that provides funding for development and civil work to local government in urban areas of Bangladesh.

== History ==
Bangladesh Municipal Development Fund was established in March 2002 by the government of Bangladesh. Its purpose is to provide funding to local government in urban areas for infrastructure and civil work.
