= ACI Limited =

Advanced Chemical Industries is a Bangladeshi company

Advanced Chemical Industries (ACI)
- Company type: Public Limited
- Traded as: DSE: ACI; CSE: ACI
- Industry: Chemical substance Pharmaceutical industry Logistics automobile Food; Communication; Consumer goods Consumer electronics
- Founded: 24 January 1973; 53 years ago
- Headquarters: ACI Centre 245, Tejgaon Industrial Area, Dhaka-1208, Bangladesh. Dhaka, Bangladesh
- Key people: Anis Ud Dowla (Chairman); Arif Dowla (Managing Director)
- Revenue: ▲ ৳69.475 billion (US$570 million) (2020)
- Operating income: ▼ ৳(98.626) million (US$800,000) (2020)
- Net income: ▼ ৳(1.444) billion (US$12 million) (2020)
- Total assets: ▲ ৳61.563 billion (US$500 million) (2020)
- Number of employees: 10,233 (2023)
- Website: www.aci-bd.com

Advanced Chemical Industries, more commonly marketed and known as ACI (CSE: ACI, DSE: ACI), is a Bangladeshi conglomerate company, present in pharmaceuticals and chemical industry. Founded in 1973, the firm is headquartered in the thana of Tejgaon I/A in Dhaka.

Advanced Chemical Industries (ACI) Limited has four major business units.

- ACI Pharmaceuticals: It makes pharmaceuticals products.
- ACI Consumer Brands: It supplies consumers goods such as toiletries, home care goods, hygiene, electricals and consumer electronics, paints and cooking essentials such as salt, flour, rice, tea and edible oil.
- ACI Agribusinesses: It has business interests in agriculture, livestock, fisheries, farm mechanization, infrastructure development services and motorcycle.
- ACI Logistics Limited: is a retail chain operating through its 144 Shwapno outlets including 34 express outlets in Bangladesh.

== History ==
In 1968, Imperial Chemical Industries, a British multinational company established a branch in then-East Pakistan. After Bangladesh gained independence in 1971, the company was incorporated on 24 January 1973 as ICI Bangladesh Manufacturers Limited and also as Public Limited Company. On 5 May 1992, ICI divested its investment in Bangladesh to the management when its name was changed to Advanced Chemical Industries (ACI) Limited. The company sold its insect control, air care and toilet care brands to SC Johnson & Son in 2015. The company contributed taka 4,318 million to the national exchequer during FY 2019–2020 in the form of corporate tax, customs duty and value-added tax.

== Sister concerns ==
- ACI Formulations Limited
- ACI Salt Limited
- ACI Pure Flour Limited
- ACI Foods Limited
- ACI Agrolink Limited
- Creative Communication Limited
- Premiaflex Plastics Limited
- ACI Motors Limited (Yamaha)
- ACI Logistics Limited (Shwapno)
- ACI Edible Oils Limited
- ACI HealthCare Limited
- ACI Chemicals Limited
- INFOLYTX Bangladesh Limited
- ACI Biotech Limited
- ACI Marine and Riverine Technologies Limited
- ACI Renewable Energy

== List of joint venture companies ==
- Tetley ACI Bangladesh Limited (divested)
- Asian Consumer Care Private Limited (divested)
- ACI Godrej Agrovet Private Limited
- ACI CO-RO Bangladesh Ltd.
- Colgate-Palmolive ACI Bangladesh Pvt. Limited
- pladis ACI Bangladesh

== Associate company ==
- Stochastic Logic Limited

== See also ==
- List of companies of Bangladesh
