= Sadhana Aushadhalaya =

Pharmaceutical company in Bangladesh, India

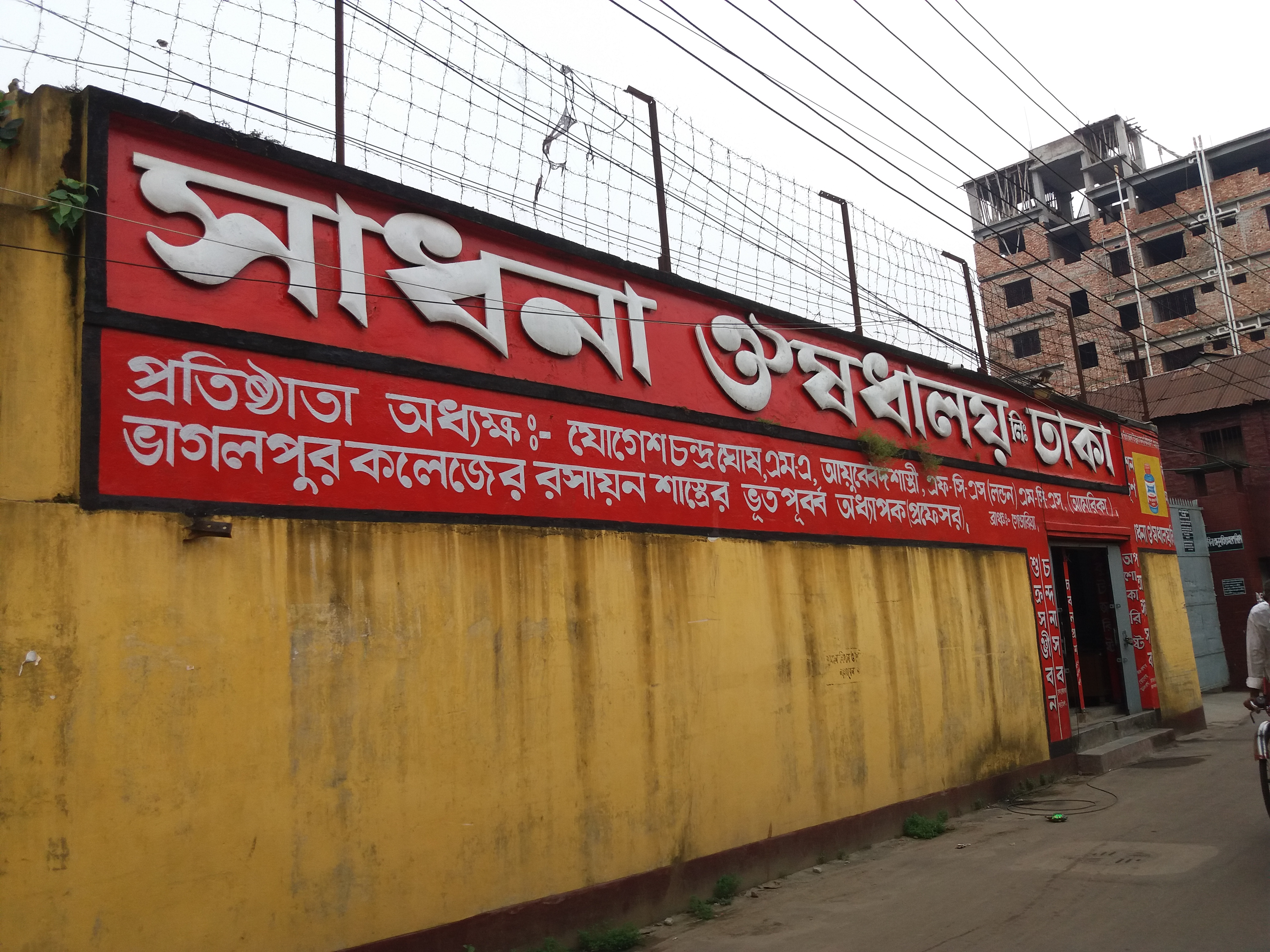
- Native name: সাধনা ঔষধালয়
- Industry: Alternative medicine
- Founded: 1914; 112 years ago in Dhaka
- Founder: Jogesh Chandra Ghosh
- Headquarters: Gendaria, Old Dhaka, Bangladesh
- Area served: Bangladesh, India

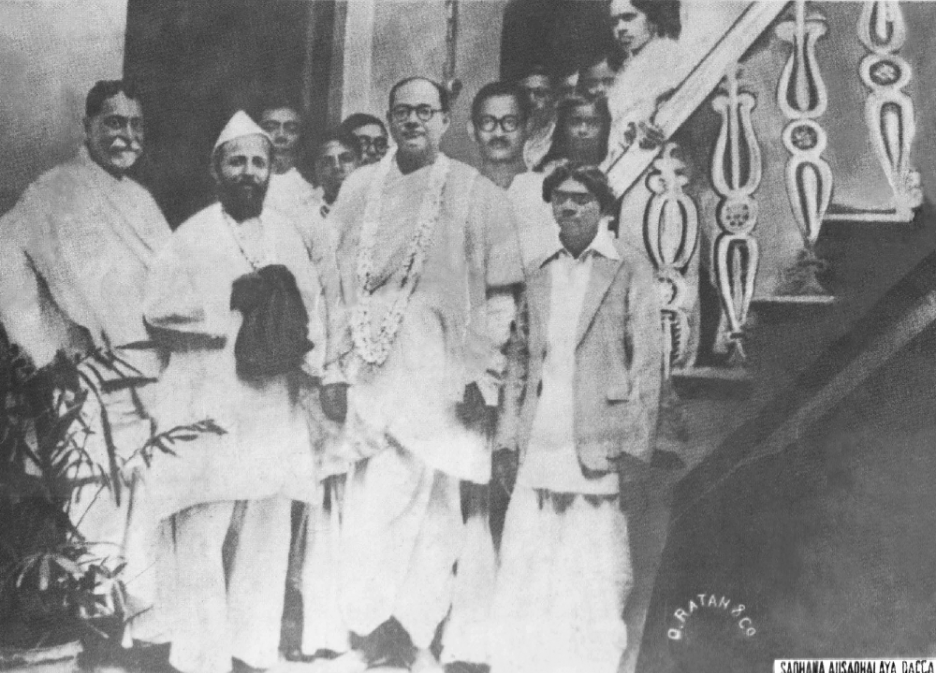
Prafulla Chandra Ray, Ashrafuddin Ahmad Chowdhury, Netaji Subhas Bose and poet Kazi Nazrul Islam at Sadhana Aushadhalaya (1924)

Sadhana Aushadhalaya Ltd. is an ayurvedic company in Bangladesh. Founded in 1914 by Jogesh Chandra Ghosh, it was the first laboratory for the manufacture of ayurvedic medicine in Bangladesh.

The headquarters of the company is located on two acres of land in Gendaria under Old Dhaka. It has 68 sales centers in Bangladesh and has branches in India. There were once about 450 types of drugs, but currently only 120 are prepared.
