= Essential Drugs Company =

- EDCL logo
- Website: https://edcl.gov.bd/

Essential Drugs Company is a state owned pharmaceutical company based in Dhaka, Bangladesh. It functions under the Ministry of Health & Family Welfare.

== History ==
The company was founded in 1962 as the Government Pharmaceuticals Laboratory under the national government of Pakistan. In 1979 the company was renamed to Pharmaceuticals Production Unit. Essential Drugs Company was established in 1983. It owns the Khulna Essential Latex Plant that manufactures latex condoms. The company started out initially as a procurement and distribution agency of the government. In order to save money, the company started to manufacture medical products. In August 2016, the company was asked by the government to produce and store water purifying tablets after flooding in Bangladesh.
