= Ghorasal Polash Urea Fertilizer Public Limited Company =

Company in Bangladesh

Ghorasal Polash urea Fertilizer Public Limited Company
- Type: Public Limited
- Industry: Fertilizer factory
- Founder: Bangladesh Chemical Industries Corporation
- Products: Urea fertilizer

Ghorasal Polash Fertilizer Public Limited Company is a fertilizer factory under BCIC which is located at Polash Upazila, Narsingdi. This is the largest fertilizer company in Bangladesh.

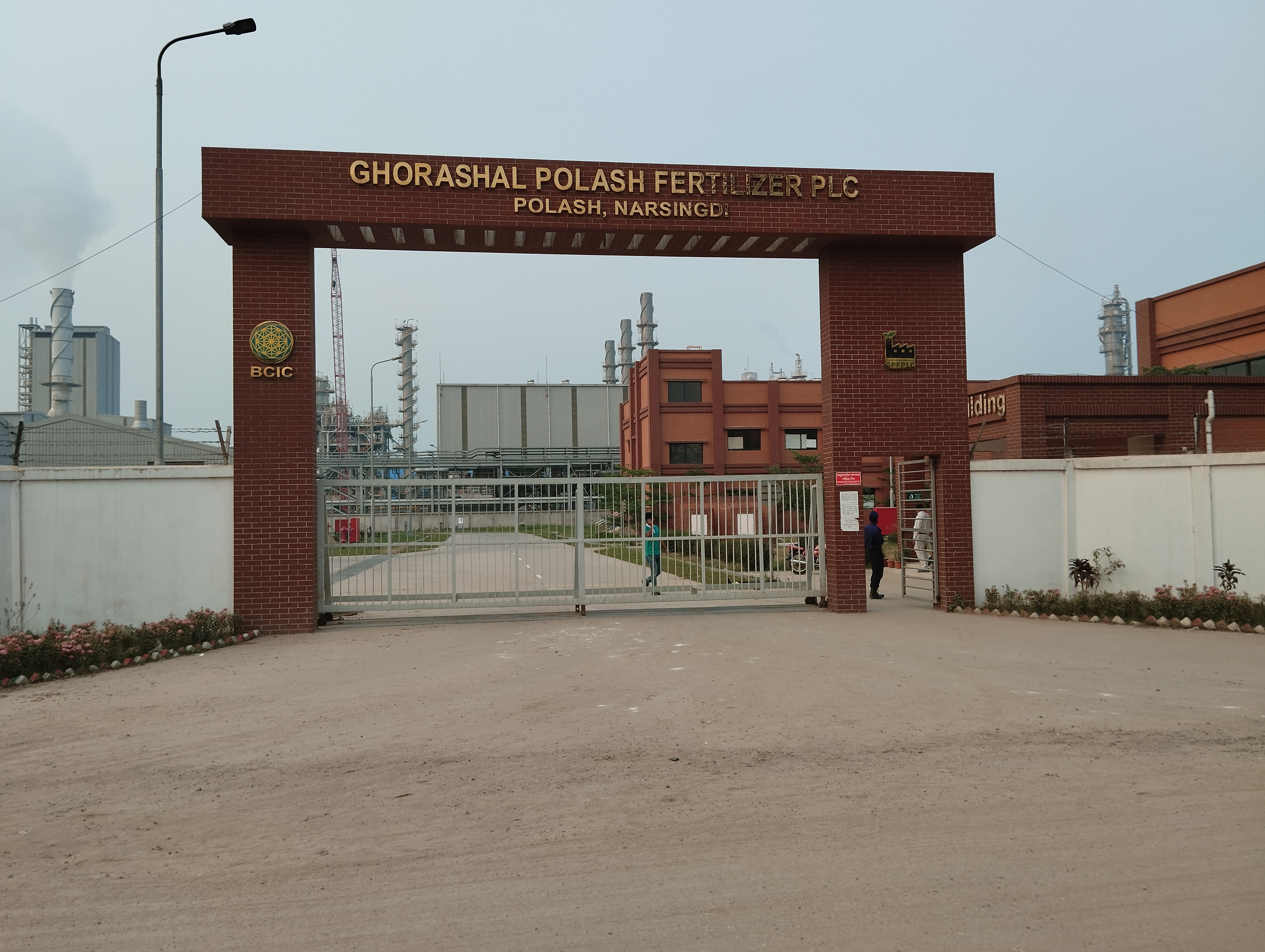
Ghorashal Polash Fertilizer PLC

== History ==
The establishment of GPFPLC was approved by the government in 2018. The factory was scheduled to go to the production in June, 2022. But it was delayed for financial and mechanical causes. Mitsubishi Heavy Industries Limited (MHI) and China National Chemical Engineering No 7 Construction Co Ltd (CC-7) worked together to construct the factory. PM Sheikh Hasina inaugurated the factory in November, 2023.

== Factory's Production ==
This factory's annual production is expected to be 9.24 lakh tons. At the same place there are two more fertilizer company which has the capacity of producing fertilizer 2.5 lakh tons annually.
