= Khulna Newsprint Mills Limited =

Bangladeshi government-owned company

- Formation: 1959
- Headquarters: Dhaka, Bangladesh
- Coordinates: 22.8553°N 89.5511°E
- Region served: Bangladesh
- Official language: Bengali

Khulna Newsprint Mills Limited (Bengali: খুলনা নিউজপ্রিন্ট মিলস লিমিটেড) was a Bangladesh government owned newsprint company and factory. As of 2001, it was the largest newsprint factory in Bangladesh.

== History ==
Khulna Newsprint Mills Limited was established in 1959 in Khalishpur Industrial Area, Khulna. The factory is located on a 87-acre site which includes housing for workers, officers, school, madrassah, and a mosque. Khulna Newsprint supplied cheaper papers than KarnaFuli Paper Mill, the largest papermill in Bangladesh. It was financed under the Colombo Plan by Export Credit Insurance Corporation, which later became Export Development Canada in 1969. Equipment at the factory was supplied by Canadian General Electric.

The Khulna Newsprint Mills Limited factory was closed down on 30 November 2002. It was closed due to following an increase in the cost of furnace oil. From 2002 to 2012, the Government of Bangladesh spent 100 million taka maintaining the factory and paying salaries. In 2005, 13 acre of the factory was leased to Bangladesh Small and Cottage Industries Corporation.

In 2015, the Government of Bangladesh announced plans to build a powerplant and a new paper mill at the site of the Khulna Newsprint Mills Limited. North West Power Generation Company Limited has been given the task to build the powerplant which will produce 750-800 megawatt. Bangladesh Chemical Industries Corporation, the holding company of Khulna Newsprint Mills Limited, will construct the papermill which will produce both newsprint and white paper.
