= Northern Electricity Supply =

Bangladesh owned power utility

Northern Electricity Supply PLC
- Company type: Government (state owned)
- Founded: 2005
- Headquarters: Hetem Khan, Rajshahi, Bangladesh
- Area served: Cities and Towns of Rajshahi Division and Rangpur Division
- Website: nesco.gov.bd

Northern Electricity Supply PLC (NESCO) is a state-owned utility located in Rajshahi, Bangladesh.

== History ==
North West Zone Power Distribution Company Limited was started its commercial operation in October 2016 by breaking up different distribution network of Bangladesh Power Development Board. It is responsible for the distribution of electricity in Rajshahi Division and Rangpur Division. The plan to create the company was formed in 2003 but was delayed by opposition from staff at Bangladesh Power Development Board. When the company was being formed some employees of Bangladesh Power Development Board vandalized the office of the chairman of the board.

Northern Electricity Supply Company Limited was established in August 2005. It was established and registered as a public limited company under the Companies Act, 1994. The company took over the North West Zone of Bangladesh Power Development Board which contained Rajshahi Division and Rangpur Division on 1 October 2016.
