= National Tubes Limited =

- Formation: 1964
- Headquarters: Dhaka, Bangladesh
- Region served: Bangladesh
- Official language: Bengali
- Website: ntl.gov.bd

National Tubes Limited (Bengali: ন্যাশনাল টিউবস লিঃ) is a Bangladesh government owned company that manufactures metal pipes. It was the first pipe manufacturing company in Bangladesh and the largest. Md. Shahidul Hoque Bhuia ndc is the chairperson, and Sa. M Ziaul Huq the managing director of the company.

== History ==
National Tubes Limited was established in Tongi Industrial Area in 1964 by Adamjee Group. After the Independence of Bangladesh, the company was nationalised in 1972. The government offloaded 49 percent of the shares in 1989 on Dhaka Stock Exchange, converting the company into a public limited company. The company had three units, established in 1964, 1980, and 1983. The first unit was decommissioned in 1993.

National Tubes Limited made 922 million taka profit in the 2019-2020 fiscal year. It is owned by Bangladesh Steel and Engineering Corporation. The company had received a major contract from Dhaka Mass Transit Company Limited for supplying Dhaka Metro Rail project. The company was one of the most traded on the Dhaka Stock Exchange.
