= Shinepukur Ceramics =

Subsidiary of Beximco

- Type: Public
- Traded as: DSE: SPCERAMICS; CSE: SPCERAMICS
- Industry: Ceramics manufacturing
- Founded: 1997
- Headquarters: Dhaka, Bangladesh
- Area served: Asia, Europe and Africa
- Products: Porcelain, Bone China and Ivory China tableware
- Parent: Beximco Ltd.
- Website: www.shinepukur.com

Shinepukur Ceramics is a ceramic manufacturing company based in Dhaka, Bangladesh.

Incorporated in 1997, Shinepukur Ceramics went into commercial production at the end of 1999. In 2005, it became a subsidiary of Beximco Group when the latter acquired 100% of its shares.

In 2011, Shinepukur Ceramics was awarded the National Export Trophy by the Export Promotion Bureau for its export performance during 2009-2010. It also won the "Dun and Bradstreet Corporate Award 2010" in the ceramics category from Dun & Bradstreet Rating Agency Bangladesh Limited.
