= Miracle Industries Limited =

Company In Bangladesh

- Formation: 1995
- Headquarters: Dhaka, Bangladesh
- Region served: Bangladesh
- Official language: Bengali
- Website: www.miracle.com.bd

Miracle Industries Limited (Bengali: মিরাকল ইন্ডাস্ট্রিজ লিমিটেড) is a Bangladesh government owned company that manufactures plastic packaging.

== History ==
Miracle Industries Limited was established in 1995 as a joint venture company by the state owned Bangladesh Chemical Industries Corporation. The company is listed in the Dhaka Stock Exchange. In 2005, the 11th annual general meeting Miracle Industries Limited announced 12.5 percent dividends for its shareholders. In November 2010, Bangladesh Securities and Exchange Commission temporarily halted trading of the company shares for unexpected price hike.

The company listed in Dhaka Stock Exchange and Chittagong Stock Exchange in 2000. In December 2019, Bangladesh Chemical Industries Corporation disputed financial filing of Miracle Industries Limited and asked Bangladesh Securities and Exchange Commission to investigate. Bangladesh Chemical Industries Corporation owns 20 percent of the shares. The same month, the factory was closed temporarily due to a shortage of working capital.

In October 2020, for directors of the company announced plans to sell their shares to Mehmood Equities Ltd.
