= Ashuganj Fertilizer and Chemical Company Limited =

- আশুগঞ্জ ফার্টিলাইজার অ্যান্ড কেমিক্যাল কোম্পানি লিমিটেড
- Formation: 1973
- Headquarters: Dhaka, Bangladesh
- Location: Ashuganj, Brahmanbaria, Bangladesh
- Region served: Bangladesh
- Official language: Bengali
- Website: Ashuganj Fertilizer and Chemical Company Limited

Ashuganj Fertilizer and Chemical Company Limited (AFCCL; Bengali: আশুগঞ্জ ফার্টিলাইজার ও কেমিক্যাল কোম্পানি লিমিটেড) is a Bangladesh government owned fertilizer company. It is under the Bangladesh Chemical Industries Corporation of the Ministry of Industries. Ashuganj Sar Karkhana College is college affiliated with the company.

== History ==
In 1973, construction began for Ashuganj Fertilizer and Chemical Industries and went into operations in December 1981. The same President of Bangladesh, Ziaur Rahman, was assassinated. The factory was renamed to Ashuganj Zia Fertiliser Factory, after President Ziaur Rahman. On 26 April 2010, the Awami League led government renamed it to Ashuganj Fertilizer and Chemical Company Limited removing Zia from the name. This move was celebrated by Awami League activists which criticised by Bangladesh Nationalist Party which was founded by Ziaur Rahman.

In September 2010, the factory was briefly closed due to mechanical problems at a cooling tower. The factory has a dedicated effluent treatment plant. It is one of four factories under the Bangladesh Chemical Industries Corporation to have an effluent treatment plant while 7 others do not possess any.

Production has declined at Ashuganj Fertilizer and Chemical Company Limited from 1600 ton per day to around 1100 ton due to machines losing productivity over time and lack of modernization. In 2010, over 100 million TK worth of Urea fertilizer was damaged due to improper storing at the factory. According to workers, every year significant amound of fertilizer in the factory get damaged or washed away by the rain due to improper storing.

=== Corruption ===
On 6 June 2007, the government terminated CBA officials at the factory after an investigation body found their involvement in the theft of 257 thousand polythene bags from the factory. The government also reduced the benefits of two officers at the factory following the investigation.

In 2014, the factory staff were investigated by Bangladesh Anti-Corruption Commission over irregularities in the recruitment of staff.
