= Karnaphuli Paper Mills =

Factory in Bangladesh

Karnaphuli Paper Mills Ltd.
- Type: Government-owned corporation
- Industry: Paper and forest products
- Founded: 1953
- Headquarters: Chandraghona, Bangladesh
- Parent: Bangladesh Chemical Industries Corporation

Karnaphuli Paper Mills, located in Chandraghona, Chittagong Division, Bangladesh, is a state-owned pulp and paper manufacturer established in 1951 by Pakistan Industrial Development Corporation (PIDC). The Dawoods took over from PIDC 1959. Following the Independence of Bangladesh, it was nationalised and came under the management of the Bangladesh Industrial Development Corporation.

Today, it operates as a subsidiary of the Bangladesh Chemical Industries Corporation and holds the distinction of being the largest paper production facility in the country. However, in 2016, the mill faced criticism for its lack of an effluent treatment facility.

== History ==
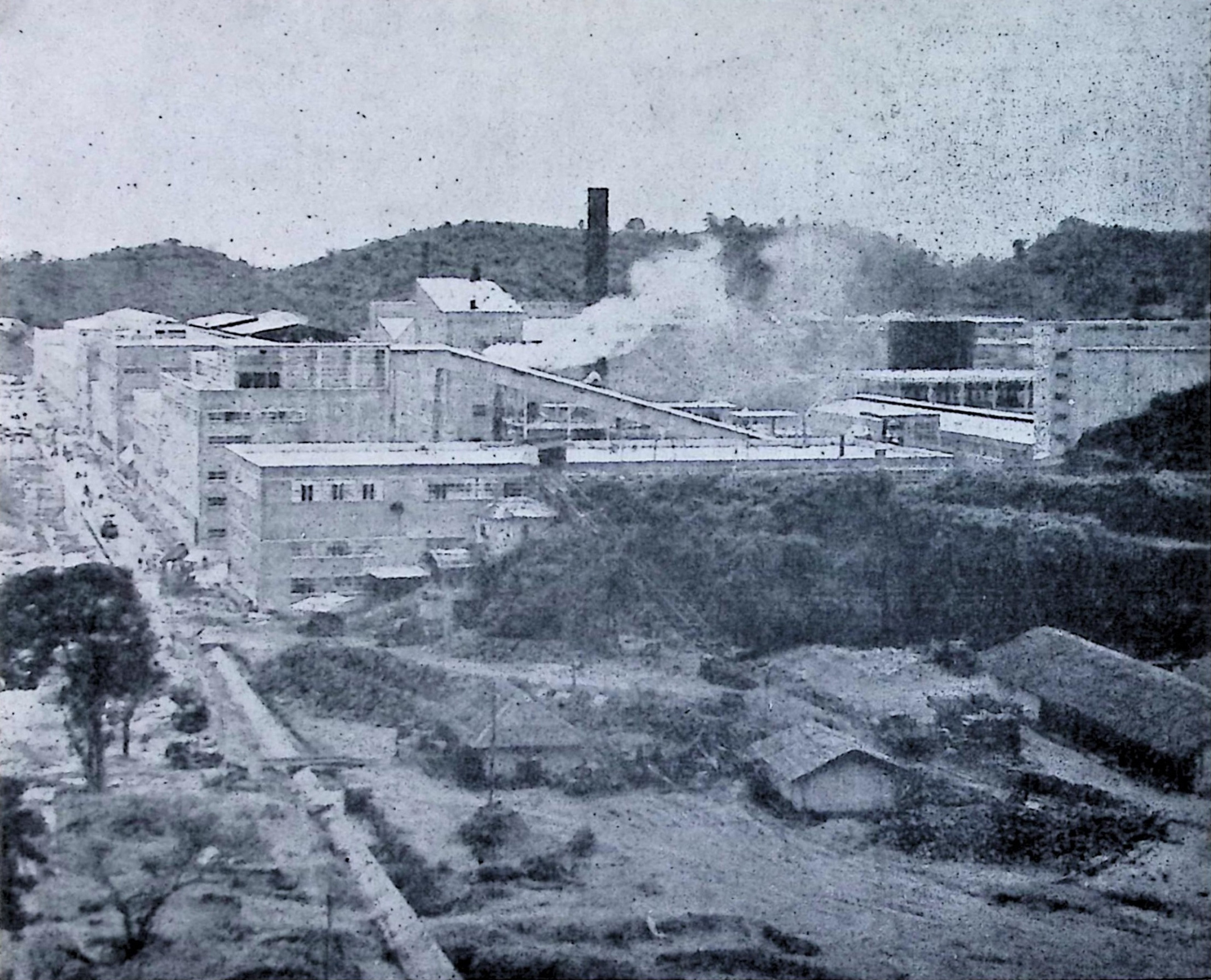
A general view of the Karnaphuli Paper Mills Ltd, East Pakistan (published in 1956)

The 1949 Industrial Conference recommended that a pulp and paper mill be set up in East Pakistan in an effort to make Pakistan self-sufficient in paper. In mid-February 1950, the government's Development Board approved the construction of the mill on the Karnafuli River. In 1954, there were violent riots between Non-Bengali and Bengali workers.

Chandragona, 26 miles upstream from Chittagong, was selected as the site because of ample availability of bamboo and water there, and ready transportation through Chittagong Port. The mill was designed to produce 30,000 tons of high quality paper annually. By January 1952, a water supply plant, power plant, and company housing had been built, and construction of the mill proper was underway. Karnaphuli Paper Mills began operating in 1953, run by the Pakistan Industrial Development Corporation, a government-owned corporation.

The Dawood Group took over the management from PIDC on 1 October 1959 and began expanding the mills' capacity to meet rising demand. After the Independence of Bangladesh the company was taken over by Bangladesh Industrial Development Corporation. As of 2016, it is the largest paper producing factory in Bangladesh and operates as a subsidiary of Bangladesh Chemical Industries Corporation. In 2016, it faced criticism for not having an effluent treatment facility.

== CEOs ==
- 1952–1953: Christian Kaijser
