= Bangladesh Insulator and Sanitaryware Factory Limited =

Government-owned manufacturing company

- Formation: 1976
- Headquarters: Dhaka, Bangladesh
- Region served: Bangladesh
- Official language: Bengali

Bangladesh Insulator and Sanitaryware Factory Limited (Bengali: বাংলাদেশ ইনসুলেটর এবং স্যানিটারিওয়্যার কারখানা লিমিটেড) is a Bangladesh government owned ceramics and sanitary ware manufacturing company. It manufactures items such as commode, basin, etc. It is sister concern of the state owned Bangladesh Chemical Industries Corporation and is classified as a statutory organization.

== History ==
Bangladesh Insulator and Sanitaryware Factory Limited was established in 1976 with technical support from M/s Prago Invest Corporation based in then Czechoslovakia. The factory in located at Mirpur Model Thana in Dhaka. The factory manufactures it products with White Clay from Netrokona District and Ball Clay from Sylhet District. In 1977 the factory started production of tiles. It is a profitable enterprise of the government of Bangladesh.

In 2018, a Ministry of Industries committee recommended that the government offload shares of the company in the stock market. The factory produces 340 million ton of products every year. It has been criticised for not doing enough to prevent pollution from the manufacturing process.
