= Triple Super Phosphate Complex Limited =

Government-owned fertilizer company in Bangladesh

- Trade name: TSP Complex Limited
- Industry: Phosphate fertilizer production
- Founded: 1974; 52 years ago
- Founder: East Pakistan Industrial Development Corporation
- Headquarters: Patenga, Chittagong
- Owner: Government of Bangladesh
- Parent: Bangladesh Chemical Industries Corporation

Triple Super Phosphate Complex Limited or TSP Complex Limited is a government owned fertilizer company in Bangladesh. It is under supervision of Bangladesh Chemical Industries Corporation (BCIC). It primarily produces phosphate fertilizers. The factory complex consists of 2 units of TSP fertilizer producing facility with installed capacity of 1,52,000 MT (Unit-1; 32,000 MT and Unit-2; 1,20,000 MT).

It was founded by East Pakistan Industrial Development Corporation (EPIDC) before the independence of Bangladesh and went into commercial production in 1974. Among the units TSP-II was commissioned earlier in September 1974 and TSP-I unit went into commercial production in April 1977. In the beginning it only produced Triple Super Phosphate (TSP) fertilizer and from 1990 is started producing Single superphosphate fertilizer also. The fertilizer complex is located Karnaphuli river bank at Patenga, Chittagong.
