= Bangladesh Pharmaceutical Society =

Research institute in Bangladesh

- Formation: 1972
- Headquarters: Dhaka, Bangladesh
- Region served: Bangladesh
- Official language: Bengali
- Website: www.bps-bd.org

Bangladesh Pharmaceutical Society is national professional society of pharmacists in Bangladesh. Mohammad Hassan Kawsar is the general secretary of the Bangladesh Pharmaceutical Society.

== History ==
Bangladesh Pharmaceutical Society was established in 1972 to advance the interests of the profession and work to implement the National Health Programme. Bangladesh Pharmaceutical Journal is the official journal of the society. It is affiliated with international organizations International Pharmaceutical Federation and Commonwealth Pharmaceutical Association.
