= Karnaphuli Fertilizer Company Limited =

Fertilizer Manufacturing Company in Bangladesh

- Type: International joint venture
- Industry: Fertilizer
- Founded: 1981; 45 years ago
- Products: Urea, Ammonia
- Website: www.kafcobd.com

Karnafuli Fertiliser Company or KAFCO is a joint venture multinational company located in Chittagong, Bangladesh that produces urea fertiliser from Natural Gas. It is located in Anwara upazila of Chittagong district by the side of the Karnafuli river occupying an area of 100.03 acres. Its shareholders include Government of Bangladesh, Bangladesh Chemical Industries Corporation (BCIC), and private sectors of Japan, Denmark and Netherlands. It is an export oriented factory and one of two major fertilizer factories in Bangladesh.

== History ==
Karnaphuli Fertilizer Company Limited was incorporated in July 1981. An agreement was signed by the Government of Bangladesh, Swedyards Development Cooperation, and Haldor Topsøe to establish the plant. International Finance Corporation agreed to finance the project and as it developed the shares of the Swedyard Development Cooperation (SDC - Sweden) and Cooperation were taken over by Haldor Topsøe. The project lacked momentum till the government of Japan agreed to finance it. Other investors included Bangladesh Chemical Industries Corporation, Overseas Economic Cooperation Fund of Japan, Chiyoda Corporation, Marubeni, Industrialisation Fund for Developing Countries, Stamicarbon, and Commonwealth Development Corporation. On 16 November 1994, construction of the plant was completed and operations started in December 1994.

== Shareholder ==
KAFCO is owned by 4 countries.

- Bangladesh
- Japan
- Denmark
- Netherlands

== Production ==
KAFCO produces about 1,500 metric tons of ammonia and 1,725 metric tons of urea per day.
