= Bangladesh Steel and Engineering Corporation =

Corporation owned by the Government of the People's Republic of Bangladesh

Bangladesh Steel and Engineering Corporation বাংলাদেশ ইস্পাত ও প্রকৌশল কর্পোরেশন
- Abbreviation: BSEC
- Formation: 1 July 1976
- Headquarters: Dhaka, Bangladesh
- Region served: Bangladesh
- Official language: Bengali
- Chairman: Abdul Khaleque
- Parent organization: Ministry of Industries
- Subsidiaries: Bangladesh Blade Factory Limited Eastern Cables Limited Eastern Tubes Limited Gazi Wires Limited General Electric Manufacturing Company Limited National Tubes Limited Atlas Bangladesh Limited
- Revenue: ▲US$960 million (2019)
- Website: bsec.gov.bd

Bangladesh Steel and Engineering Corporation (Bengali: বাংলাদেশ ইস্পাত ও প্রকৌশল কর্পোরেশন) or BSEC, is a government owned corporation in Bangladesh.

== History ==
Bangladesh Steel and Engineering Corporation was founded on 1 July 1976. It is in charge of Pragoti, which assembles Mahindra cars in Bangladesh. In 2016, it signed an agreement with Honda to assemble motorcycles in Bangladesh. It handed over its Dockyard and Engineering Works in Narayanganj and Chittagong Dry Dock Limited in Chattogram to Bangladesh Navy. Chittagong Dry Dock Limited that the BSEC formerly owned built a footbridge with six openings in Sylhet. It also owns GEMCO, a wire manufacturer, and National Tubes in Gazipur. Its headquarters is the BSEC building in Kawran Bazar, which also houses the headquarters of RTV, NTV and Amar Desh.

== See also ==
- Bangladesh Blade Factory Limited
- Bangladesh Machine Tools Factory
