= Jamuna Fertilizer Company Limited =

- Formation: 1991
- Headquarters: Dhaka, Bangladesh
- Region served: Bangladesh
- Official language: Bengali
- Website: Jamuna Fertilizer Company Limited

Jamuna Fertilizer Company Limited (Bengali: যমুনা সার কোম্পানি লিমিটেড) is a Bangladesh government owned fertilizer company based in Jamalpur District. It was under the Bangladesh Chemical Industries Corporation of the Ministry of Industries. Khan Md. Shahid Ullah is the managing director of Jamuna Fertilizer Company Limited. It is one of the largest fertilizer factories in Bangladesh.

== History ==
Jamuna Fertilizer Company Limited was established in 1991 with technical support from Mitsubishi Heavy Industries by Bangladesh Chemical Industries Corporation.

In January 2009, Jamuna Fertilizer Company reported production shortages due to inadequate supply of natural gas. It could produce only 1200 metric ton of urea fertilizer against a capacity of 1700 metric ton per day. The company is responsible for supply 20 districts in northern Bangladesh. The factory stopped production 11 times in 2010 due to low natural gas pressure and technical issues. The factory was closed from April to June 2011 due to shortage of gas supply. Production was troubled by uncertain gas supplies well into 2017. It is supplied natural gas by Titas Gas Transmission and Distribution Company.

On 11 November 2018, there was a fire at Jamuna Fertilizer Company Limited forcing production to close down. The government of Bangladesh imported fertilizer to meet domestic demands. About 570 million taka worth of that imported fertilizer were damaged in September 2019 after being improperly stored in the open.

On 23 January 2016, security guards caught a truck driver attempting to smuggle three tones of sulfuric acid from the factory.
