= Usmania Glass Sheet Factory Limited =

Company in Bangladesh

- Formation: 1959
- Headquarters: Dhaka, Bangladesh
- Region served: Bangladesh
- Official language: Bengali
- Website: www.ugsflbd.com

Usmania Glass Sheet Factory Limited (Bengali: উসমানিয়া গ্লাস শিট কারখানা লিমিটেড) is a Bangladesh government owned glass manufacturing company. The company is listed on the Dhaka Stock Exchange.

== History ==
Usmania Glass Sheet Factory Limited was established on 30 June 1959 in Kalurghat Industrial Area, Chittagong as a private limited company. On 27 October 1963, the company was turned into a public limited company. After the Independence of Bangladesh, the company was nationalised by the government of Bangladesh in 1972 through the Bangladesh Industrial Enterprises (Nationalization) order. It is under the Bangladesh Chemical Industries Corporation of the Ministry of Industries. The factory is situated in a 10-acre site and produces 20 million square feet of glass every year.

In 2019, the company announced plans to invest 3 billion taka to modernize its factory in Chittagong. The company had been producing glass using Fourcault process which is costlier than the Float glass process used by private manufacturers in Bangladesh. The company had to sell their products at below manufacturing costs and had been making a loss for the last 5 years. Bangladesh Chemical Industries Corporation owns 51 percent of the shares of the company, financial institutions own 9.93 percent, and the rest of the shares are on the stock exchange. The company shares on the Dhaka Stock Exchange were moved in Z category in 2019.

In June 2020, the factory was closed temporarily following the COVID-19 Pandemic in Bangladesh. On 7 August 2021, the factory resumed production.
