= Bangladesh Chemical Industries Corporation =

Bangladeshi state-owned chemical company

- বাংলাদেশ রাসায়নিক শিল্প কর্পোরেশন
- Seal of BCIC

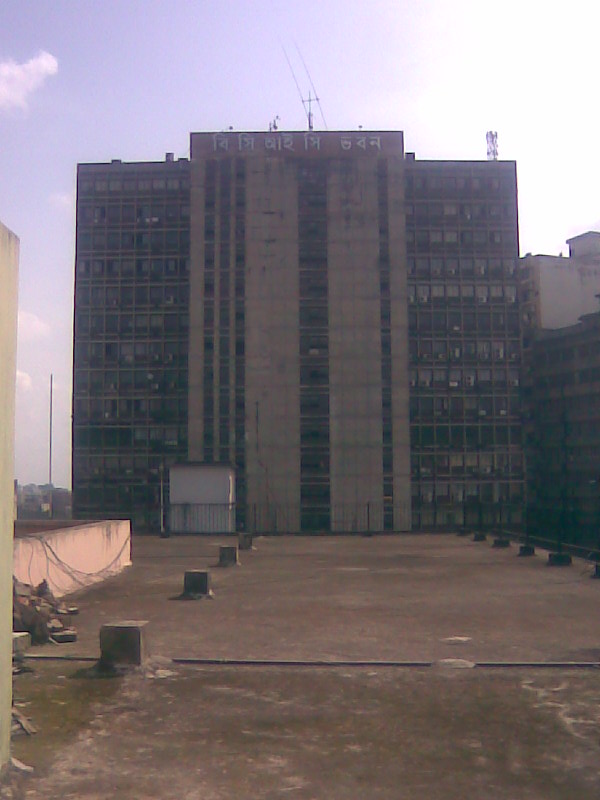
- BCIC building in Dhaka
- Formation: 1976
- Headquarters: Dhaka, Bangladesh
- Region served: Bangladesh
- Official language: Bengali
- Website: bcic.gov.bd

Bangladesh Chemical Industries Corporation (BCIC) is a government owned corporation in Bangladesh. It was establishted on 1st July, 1976 by a Presidential Order by merging Bangladesh Tanneries Corporation, Bangladesh Paper and Board Corporation, Bangladesh Chemical and Pharmacetucials Corporation.

== History ==
Bangladesh Chemical Industries Corporation was founded in 1976. It is in charge of Karnafuli Paper Mills, the largest Paper Mill in Bangladesh. It operates 12 factories in Bangladesh including Ashuganj Fertilizer and Chemical Company Limited in Brahmanbaria, DAP Fertilizer Company Limited in Chittagong and Polash Urea Fertiliser Factory in Palash, Narsingdi. The corporation has liabilities of 51.06 billion taka to state owned banks. BCIC College is run by the corporation. In 1982, it set up the first tiles factory in Bangladesh. It is subsidized by Bangladesh government. The Training Institute for Chemical Industries (TICI) is a sister concern of BCIC and is run by BCIC too. Chittagong Urea Fertilizer School and College falls under this corporation, as does Urea Sar Karkhana School & College.

== Corruption ==
Deputy-chief of personnel Momtaz Begum of BCIC was found involved in graft and nepotism after a probe by the Ministry of Industries. She was promoted despite the findings of the probe to chief of personnel. In March 2017, Mohammad Iqbal, the chairman of the BCIC, was transferred to Bangladesh Climate Change Trust, and was replaced by Additional Secretary Shah Md Aminul Haq. Iqbal refused to hand over his charge to Haq and has since been lobbying government officials to retain his job as of April 2017. On 17 May 2017, Harun-ar-Rashid, the chief of BCIC warehouse in Patuakhali disappeared along with 100 million taka worth fertilizer. BCIC had seen in the past, hundreds of thousands of fertilizer disappearing.

== See also ==
- Triple Super Phosphate Complex Limited
- Jamuna Fertilizer Company Limited
- Ashuganj Fertilizer and Chemical Company Limited
- Bangladesh Insulator and Sanitaryware Factory Limited
- Usmania Glass Sheet Factory Limited
- Khulna Hard Board Mills Limited
- Khulna Newsprint Mills Limited
- Miracle Industries Limited
- Ghorasal Polash Urea Fertilizer Public Limited Company
