= Coal mining in Bangladesh =

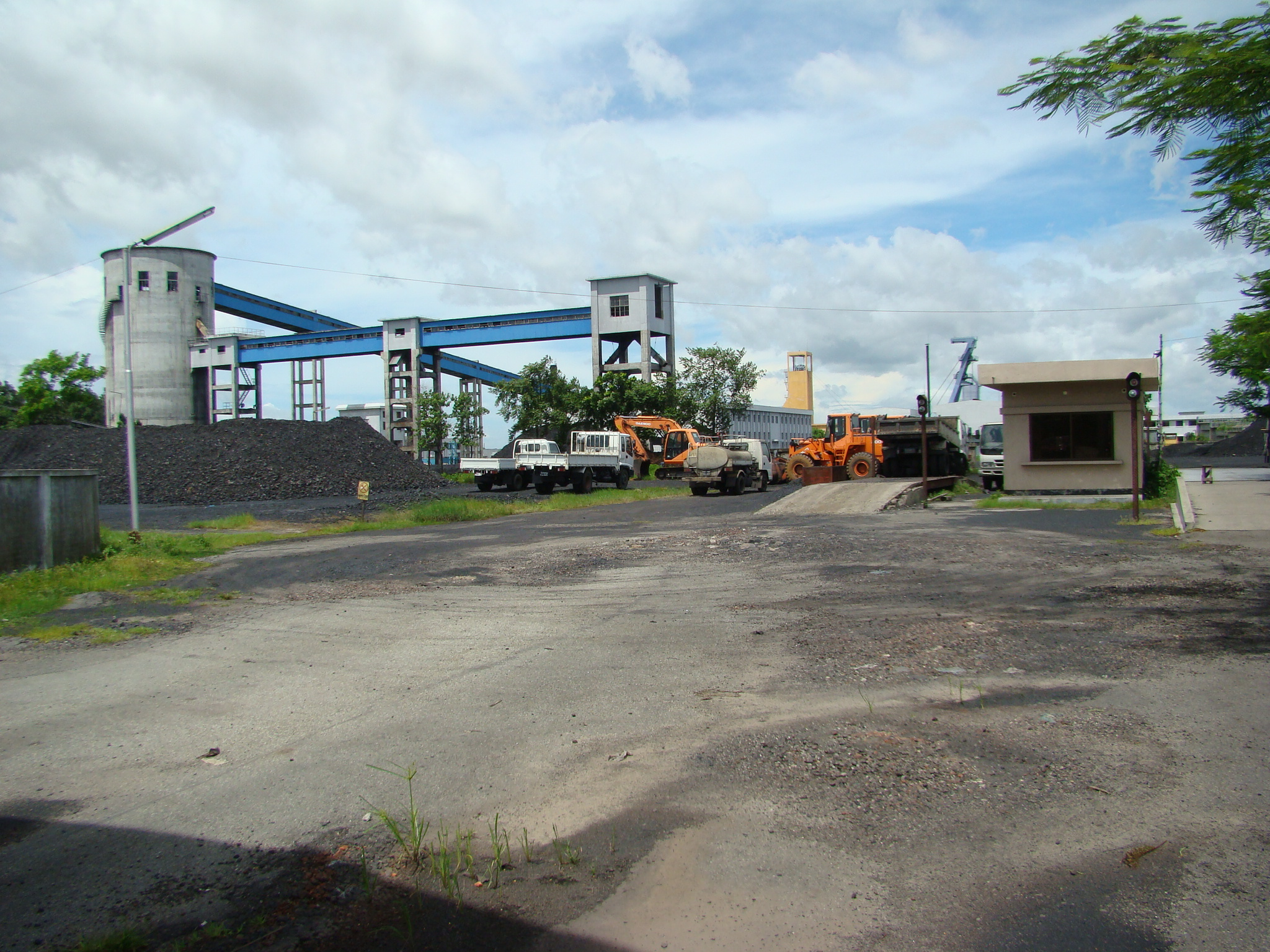
Barapukuria Coal Mine

Coal mining in Bangladesh started with the discovery of the first coal mine in Jamalganj in 1962. Mining in Bangladesh consists mainly of coal, granite, natural gas, and petroleum mining.

== History ==
In Pre-partition era of British India, coal from Garo hills of Meghalaya was transported and traded through East Bengal. Mining offices opened in Dhaka and trade was aided by British Rail network in India. In 1961 UN-Pak Mineral Survey Project started surveys in then East Pakistan (today Bangladesh) by Geological Survey of Pakistan. In 1962 the survey found 1.05 million tons of coal in Jamalganj, Sunamganj District. The next big discovery came in 1985 when Geological Survey of Bangladesh discovered coal in Dinajpur. In 1989 a coalfield was discovered in khalashpir, Rangpur District and another in 1995 in Dighipara by the Geological Survey of Bangladesh. Multinational BHP discovered Phulbari coalfield in 1997. Global Coal Management is waiting approval for the Phulbari coalfield. Bangladesh has an estimated 2 billion tonnes of coal in underground reserves in the Northwest region of the country. Bangladeshi coal reserves are underexplored because of concerns related to method, technology, and social consequences. Coal and limestone mined in Meghalaya was transported to Bangladesh, and helped the establishment of cement factories there. Coal accounts for two percent of the energy generation in Bangladesh. The government of Bangladesh has not established a unified coal policy. The Government of Bangladesh plans to increase power generation from coal to 50 percent from the present 2 percent by 2021.

=== Barapukuria coal mine ===
Barapukuria coal mine is run by the Barapukuria Coal Mining Company Limited. Barapukuria Coal Mining Company Limited is a subsidiary of the state owned Petrobangla. The mine is located in Dinajpur, this is the only active mine in Bangladesh. The locals near the mine have reported damages to their houses. The water bodies near the mine have dried up. In response the government has acquired lands near the mine.

In July 2018, it was revealed that the around 142 hundred thousand tons of coal, worth over BDT 227 billion, has been misappropriated by the officials of the Barapukuria Coal Mining Company Limited. The incident became popularly known as the Barapukuria coal scam.

== See also ==
- Climate change in Bangladesh
- Nonviolent movement opposing open pit mining in Bangladesh from 2006 - 2014
