= Begumganj Gas Field =

Natural gas field in Bangladesh

- Location within Bangladesh
- Country: Bangladesh
- Region: Noakhali
- Offshore/onshore: onshore
- Coordinates: 22.9878°N 91.1645°E
- Operator: Bangladesh Petroleum Exploration and Production Company Limited (BAPEX)

Field history
- Discovery: 1977
- Start of production: 2015

Begamganj Gas Field (Bengali: বেগমগঞ্জ গ্যাসক্ষেত্র) is a natural gas field located in Begumganj Upazila, Noakhali District, Bangladesh. The gas field was discovered in 1977 by Petrobangla, with an estimated 930 million cubic metres of recoverable natural gas.

Extraction of natural gas began in 2015, after a third well was drilled by Gazprom. As of 2024, Begumganj-3 was producing 84 million cubic metres of gas per year. It is under the control of BAPEX.

== History ==
=== Discovery ===
In 1976, state-run Petrobangla's exploration arm drilled a well in Begumganj Thana. The thana (sub-district) is in Noakhali District in eastern Bangladesh. Petrobangla announced the discovery of the Begumganj Gas Field in 1977. A second well was drilled before exploration wrapped up in 1978. The size of the field was estimated at 930 million cubic metres (32.7 billion cubic feet), which was too small to justify development at the time.

=== Development ===
In March 2006, three subsidiaries of Petrobangla proposed a joint venture to develop the field in two phases. Bangladesh Gas Fields Company Limited (BGFCL) and Sylhet Gas Fields Limited (SGFL) would each invest 1.5 billion Bangladeshi taka ($22 million in 2006). Bangladesh Petroleum Exploration and Production Company Limited (BAPEX), the owner of the field, would be the working partner. The first stage would have used half the investment to develop the field, then the other half for further exploration. They were, however, unable to obtain the tax breaks they argued were necessary to make the project viable. So in May 2010, Petrobangla abandoned the project. They said that because the field lay far from existing gas infrastructure, developing and connecting it to the network would be beyond their resources.

Meanwhile, in September 2009, Petrobangla solicited bids from foreign firms to drill multiple wells on a contract basis. These included another well in the Begumganj Gas Field. The contract was awarded to a Polish company, Poszukiwania Nastyi Gazu Krakow. The Poles backed out in 2011, however, saying they would be unable to do the work. Petrobangla turned to Gazprom, which signed a drilling deal in April 2012 that averaged Tk 1.54 billion ($19.5 million in 2012) per well.

Gazprom spudded in Begumganj-3 on 27 July 2013. Drilling ended in October at a depth of 3,565 metres. Petrobangla reported on 11 November that they had discovered new gas reserves at 2,900 metres. Production did not begin, however, because there was no gas transmission line and no available processing capacity at the site for the expected volume.

=== Production ===
A processing plant was built at the field, and a pipeline to the Bakhrabad Gas Field was laid. Production from Begumganj-3 commenced in March 2015. About 25 million cubic metres (0.88 billion cubic feet) of gas was extracted before the well was decommissioned in July 2016 due to gas flow drop. A workover in 2018 found commercially extractable gas at a depth of 1,926 to 1,941 metres. As of 2024, Begumganj-3 was producing 230,000 cubic metres (8 million cubic feet) of gas per day.

Begumganj-4 was drilled in 2024 near Wasekpur village of Sonaimuri Upazila, about 2.5 kilometres (1.6 mi) from the third well. It found gas structures in three layers, at 1,900 metres, 2,500 metres, and 3,081 metres.

== See also ==
- List of natural gas fields in Bangladesh
- Gas Transmission Company Limited
