= Bakhrabad Gas Distribution Company Limited =

Bakhrabad Gas Distribution Company Limited (BGDCL)
- Abbreviation: BGDCL
- Formation: 7 June 1980
- Type: SOE
- Legal status: Active
- Purpose: Gas distribution
- Headquarters: Chapapur, Cumilla , Bangladesh
- Region served: Cumilla
- Official language: Bengali
- Parent organization: Petrobangla
- Website: bgdcl.gov.bd

Bakhrabad Gas Distribution Company Limited is a government owned major gas company in Bangladesh. It is one of the gas distribution companies under Petrobangla and is headquartered in Chapapur, Cumilla .

== History ==
Bakhrabad Gas Distribution Company Limited was established on 7 June 1980 as Bakhrabad Gas Systems Limited with the responsibility to operate Bakhrabad Gas Field. The government on 31 May 1989 handed over the management of Bakhrabad Gas Field to Bangladesh Gas Fields Company Limited. On 2 September 2004 the government transferred Bakhrabad-Demra Transmission Pipelines' control from the company to Gas Transmission Company Limited. On 18 October 2004 the Bakhrabad-Chittagong Transmission Pipelines of the company were also placed under the Gas Transmission Company Limited. The various divisions of the company assets reduced the company functions to marketing and distribution only. The assets of the company in the Chittagong District and Chittagong Hill Tracts were given to Karnaphuli Gas Distribution Company Limited. Through reforms of Bakhrabad Gas Systems Limited and addition of assets in Brahmanbaria District of Titas Gas Transmission and Distribution Company, the Bakhrabad Gas Distribution Company Limited was formed.

The Bakhrabad Gas Distribution company's calls for raising the price of gas in 2016 were denied by Bangladesh Energy Regulatory Commission. According to a news report of the Dhaka Tribune, CNG stations in Comilla District were illegally selling 1.2 billion taka of gas with the help of corrupt staffs in the company. In the 2017-2018 fiscal year the company made 21.7 million taka.

== See also ==
- Bakhrabad Gas Adarsha Bidhalaya- a school operated by the company.
