= Kailashtilla Gas Field =

Natural gas field in Bangladesh

Kailashtila Gas Field
- Location within Bangladesh
- Country: Bangladesh
- Region: Sylhet
- Offshore/onshore: onshore
- Coordinates: 24.8667°N 92.0258°E
- Operator: Sylhet Gas Fields Limited

Field history
- Discovery: 1962
- Start of production: 1983

Kailashtilla Gas Field (Bengali: কৈলাসটিলা গ্যাসক্ষেত্র) is a natural gas field at Sylhet, Bangladesh. It was discovered in 1962 by Pakistan Shell Oil Company. It started producing gas in 1983. It is controlled by Sylhet Gas Fields Limited. This gas field is situated nearly 35 km away from Beanibazar Gas Field. In 2012, conducting a 3D seismic surveys, Bangladesh Petroleum Exploration and Production Company (BAPEX) found nearly 137 million barrels oil reserves in Kailashtilla and Haripur; of which 109 million barrels of oil reserves were discovered in Kailashtilla and the remaining 28 million barrels in Haripur. Oil was first discovered in Haripur field in the 1980s. According to BAPEX, the oil found in Kailashtila field is lighter and easily extractable, then that in Haripur.

== See also ==
- List of natural gas fields in Bangladesh
- Bangladesh Gas Fields Company Limited
- Gas Transmission Company Limited
