= Muqtadir Ali =

Bangladeshi military officer (died 2021)

Muqtadir Ali (died 2021) was a veteran of the Bangladesh Liberation War, a major of the Bangladesh Army, and a chairman of Petrobangla. Over several decades, he held senior leadership roles in Bangladesh's state-owned energy sector, including positions at Bangladesh Petroleum Corporation, Bangladesh Petroleum Exploration and Production Company Limited, Titas Gas, and Sylhet Gas Fields.

== Career ==
In 1971, Ali was studying at the East Pakistan University of Engineering and Technology (now Bangladesh University of Engineering and Technology) when the Bangladesh Liberation War began. He left for India to join the war effort and initially received intelligence training while attached to an Indian Army brigade. After this first phase of training, he was deployed inside Bangladesh to collect information on the movements and positions of Pakistani Armed Forces. He later underwent further military training at Loharband in the Silchar jungle area of Assam.

Following the completion of training, Ali was assigned to Baropunji Sub-Sector 4 under Sector 4, where he participated in patrols, operations in tea garden areas, and acts of sabotage, including the destruction of small bridges. He was later selected for the 2nd Bangladesh War Course (SS-2) and joined officer training at Murtee in November 1971. After receiving his commission, he was posted to the Minor Tigers (3rd East Bengal).

After the Independence of Bangladesh, Ali served in the Bangladesh Army, including postings with the Dashing Tigers (36 East Bengal Regiment) and 10 East Bengal Regiment, and as an adjutant at Mirzapur Cadet College. On 15 August 1975, then-Captain Ali became one of the early military officers to witness the aftermath of the assassination of Sheikh Mujibur Rahman and his family at their residence on Road 32, Dhanmondi. According to his later account, Ali and fellow officer Captain Jibon Kanai Das learned of the coup through a radio broadcast. Subsequently, they accompanied a senior officer on official duty through the city during the imposition of martial law. While returning via Mirpur Road, they encountered Major Bazlul Huda, one of the coup leaders, who invited them to enter the residence. Das described observing multiple bodies inside the premises, including those of Sheikh Mujibur Rahman, his family members, and staff, all of whom had been killed. They covered the bodies with bedsheets found on-site, stating that their actions were guided by military tradition and respect for the deceased.

Following his retirement from military service, he transitioned into the energy sector and held several key administrative positions. He served as managing director of the Bangladesh Petroleum Exploration and Production Company Limited (BAPEX) and later became chairman of Petrobangla. He replaced Jalal Ahmed at Petrobangla, who was transferred to the Ministry of Establishment. He also served as chairman of Bangladesh Petroleum Corporation and as managing director of both Titas Gas and Sylhet Gas Fields. In 2012, he was appointed as an additional secretary in the government of Bangladesh. He was the first coordinator of Bangladesh's LNG terminal initiative and later worked as a consultant to various energy companies.

== Death ==
Ali died on 22 August 2021 at the Combined Military Hospital in Dhaka, Bangladesh, after sustaining a head injury in an accidental fall at his home. He was buried with state honours at the Banani Military Graveyard.
