= Rashidpur Gas Field =

Natural gas field in Bangladesh

- Location within Bangladesh
- Country: Bangladesh
- Region: Habiganj
- Offshore/onshore: onshore
- Coordinates: 24.2952227°N 91.5867289°E
- Operator: Sylhet Gas Fields Limited (SGFL)
- Partner: Gazprom

Field history
- Discovery: 1960
- Start of production: 1993

Rashidpur Gas Field (Bengali: রশিদপুর গ্যাসক্ষেত্র) is a natural gas field located in Habiganj, Bangladesh. In 1960, Pakistan Shell Oil Company discovered it. In 1975, this gas field came under the control of the Government of Bangladesh. It is one of the sixth gasfields owned and operated by the state-owned company Sylhet Gas Fields Company Limited.

== Geography ==
A gas field was discovered for the first time in the hilly area namely Rashidpur of No.7 Bhadeshwar Union in Bahubal Upazila. Rashidpur gas field is located in Rashidpur of Bahubal upazila of Habiganj. It is situated between Moulvibazar and Habiganj in Sylhet Division. In the year 1990–91, a well was drilled and two plants were set up. A total of 8 wells have been drilled and linked up to meet the demand of gas by the North-South Pipeline. In 2015, Gazprom was assigned to drill Rashidpur gas fields along with Srikail and Bakhrabad.

== Production ==
In 1993, gas was started lifting by the 7 wells of Rashidpur gas field. In 2011, BAPEX, the state-owned organization of Bangladesh, conducted a three-dimensional seismic survey, and found the stock of about one trillion cubic feet of gas at the gas field. The gas was started lifting experimentally by the No.8 well. According to an estimation of 2015, the reserves of this gas field amounted to 5.2 TCF. It was reported that the production of octane would be produced in 2016. The production of the five wells of the Rashidpur gas field was 60 million cubic feet, but in 2019 it was reduced to 50 million cubic feet.

== See also ==
- List of natural gas fields in Bangladesh
- Bangladesh Gas Fields Company Limited
- Gas Transmission Company Limited
