= Barapukuria coal mine =

Coal mine in Bangladesh

Barapukuria Coal Mine
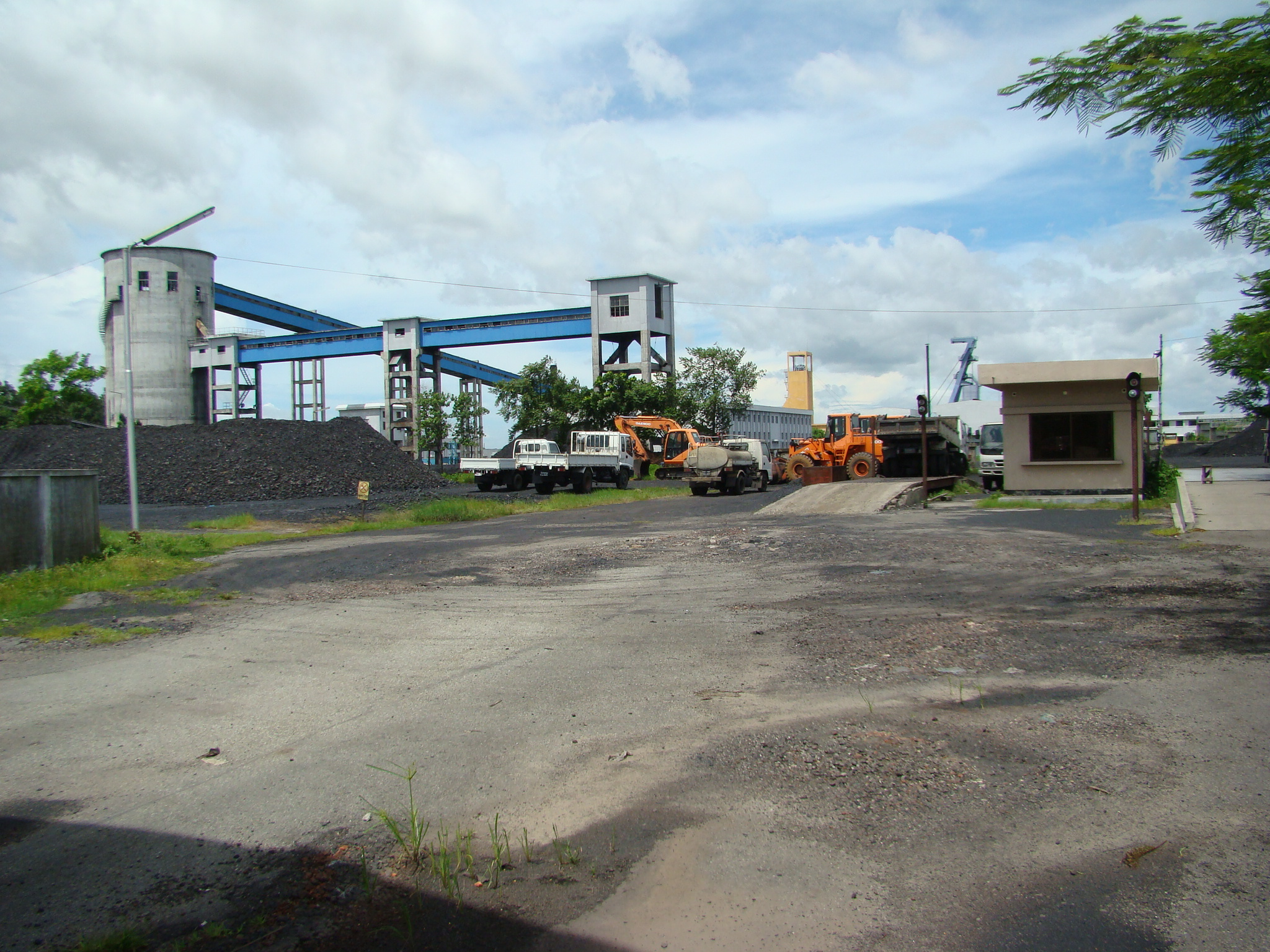
- Barapukuria Coal Mine, Bangladesh

- Location within Bangladesh
- Location: Chowhati, Parbatipur, Dinajpur, Bangladesh; 25°32′51.2″N 88°57′38.6″E
- Company: Barapukuria Coal Mining Company Limited, Petrobangla
- Website: http://bcmcl.org.bd/
- Acquired: 1997

Barapukuria Coal Mine is run by the Barapukuria Coal Mining Company Limited in Bangladesh. Barapukuria Coal Mining Company Limited is a subsidiary of the state owned Petrobangla. The mine is located at Parbatipur upazila in Dinajpur. This is the lone active coal mine in Bangladesh.

== History ==
In Pre-partition era of British India, coal from Garo hills of Meghalaya was transported and traded through East Bengal. Mining offices opened in Dhaka and trade was aided by British Rail network in India. In 1961 UN-Pak Mineral Survey Project started surveys in then East Pakistan (today Bangladesh) by Geological Survey of Pakistan. In 1962 the survey found 1.05 million ton of coal in Jamalganj, Sunamganj District. The next big discovery came in 1985 when Geological Survey of Bangladesh discovered coal in Dinajpur. In 1989 a coalfield was discovered in khalashpir, Rangpur District and another in 1995 in Dighipara by the Geological Survey of Bangladesh. Multinational BHP discovered Phulbari coalfield in 1997. Global Coal Management is waiting approval for the Phulbari coalfield. Bangladesh has an estimated 2 billion tonnes of coal in underground reserves in the Northwest region of the country.

== Adverse Impact ==
The locals near the mine have reported damages to their houses. The water bodies near the mine have dried up. In response the government has acquired lands near the mine.

== See also ==
- Coal mining in Bangladesh
- Barapukuria coal scam
- Barapukuria Power Station
