= Natural gas in Bangladesh =

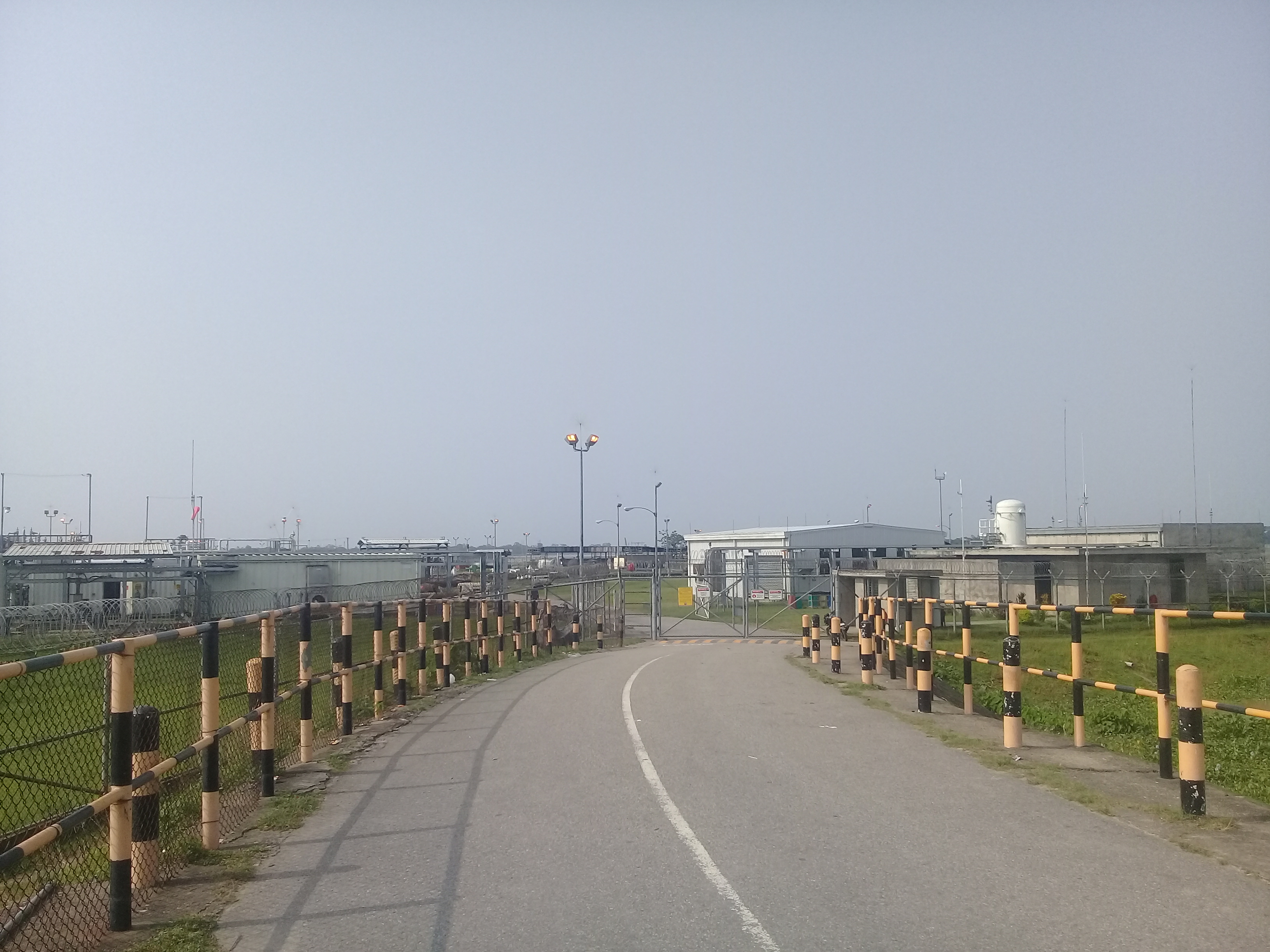
Bibiyana Gas Field

Gas export-import balance in Bangladesh

Gas supplies meet 56% of Bangladesh's energy demand. However, the country faces an acute energy crisis in meeting the demands of its vast and growing population. Bangladesh is a net importer of crude oil and petroleum products. The energy sector is dominated by state-owned companies, including Petrobangla and the Bangladesh Petroleum Corporation. Chevron, ConocoPhillips, Equinor, Gazprom and ONGC are major international companies engaged in Bangladesh's hydrocarbon industry, with Chevron's gas fields accounting for 50% of natural gas production.

Geologists believe the country's maritime exclusive economic zone holds one of the largest oil and gas reserves in the Asia-Pacific. Protectionism and a lack of technical capacity have impeded Bangladesh's potential to emerge as a major global hydrocarbon producer. Two LNG Terminal and a gas pipeline will be created to ease the gas shortage issues in Bangladesh.

The International Islamic Trade Finance Corp has signed a $1.4 billion agreement to cover Bangladesh's oil imports.

== History ==
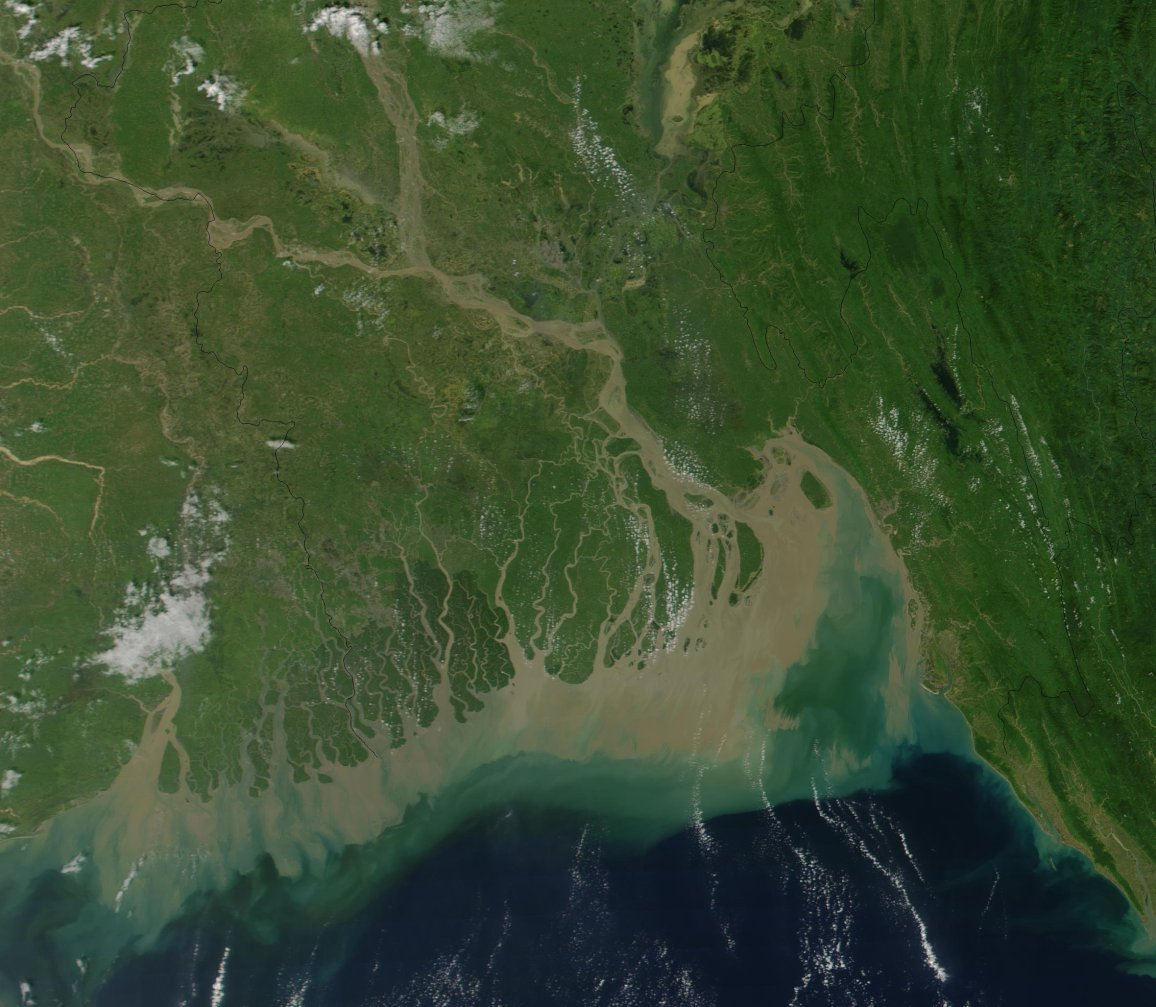
Eastern and southern Bangladesh, as well as the Bay of Bengal, are rich in gas deposits.

The Indo-Burma Petroleum Company drilled the first oil wells in Eastern Bengal between 1908 and 1914 in Chittagong District. The Burmah Oil Company discovered the first gas field in East Bengal in 1955. Industrial use of natural gas began in 1959. The Shell Oil Company and Pakistan Petroleum discovered seven major gas fields in the 1960s.

After the Bangladesh Liberation War, the first government of Bangladesh led by Sheikh Mujibur Rahman, with Dr. Kamal Hossain as Minister of Energy, enacted the Bangladesh Petroleum Act in 1974. The government welcomed many international oil companies to explore the country. It established Petrobangla as the national mineral resources company. During the 1980s, Petrobangla accelerated exploration activities, discovering nine major gas fields and establishing the country’s first commercial oil facility at Haripur in 1986. The Jalalabad, Maulvi Bazar, Bibiyana and Bangura-Lalmai gas fields were tapped in the 1990s by numerous multinational oil and gas companies, including Shell and Unocal. The energy giant Chevron acquired the assets of Unocal in Bangladesh in 2005.

=== Offshore exploration ===
In 1974 the government awarded seven shallow water offshore blocks on the continental shelf of Bangladesh to six international oil companies. However, these companies left Bangladesh in 1978 amid technical difficulties and political instability. Oil was their primary target and early exploration indicated that the area possessed gas rather than oil. The world petroleum scenario had since changed and interest in gas exploration increased among IOCs, despite challenges in offshore deep water exploration. In 1998, the Bangladeshi government awarded four shallow water blocks for to a new group of IOCs. Shell, Cairn Energy and Santos operated the offshore Sangu gas platform.

Since 2009, the Bangladeshi government has launched bidding rounds for awarding oil platform blocks. ConocoPhillips and Tullow Oil won the first round of bids. The victory of Bangladesh over Myanmar in securing maritime territory in the Bay of Bengal has increased the number of exploratory blocks in the Exclusive Economic Zone to 27.

According to Dhaka University geology professor Badrul Imam, Bangladesh is neither floating on gas nor about to run out of it, rather Bangladesh's gas fields are unexplored which could be a major source of local gas supply.

== Geography ==
The Bengal delta has a hydrocarbon-bearing sediment structure with rich mineral deposits. The northeastern Sylhet Division is the country's largest natural gas and crude oil producer, followed by Chittagong Division, Dhaka Division and Barisal Division; while dozens of offshore blocks lay in the Bay of Bengal. Natural gas from Bangladesh is renowned for being very pure with a composition of 95–99% methane and almost no sulphur.

== Industry ==
As of 2015, the natural gas reserves of Bangladesh is 14.16 trillion cubic feet. The country has an average daily natural gas production of around 2,700 million cubic feet. As of 2024, Bangladesh currently has 29 gas fields, with 20 of them in production. Petrobangla estimates that the proven reserves are at 28.79 trillion cubic feet (TCF). Out of which 20.33 TCF has been extracted until June 2023, leaving the reserve at 8.46 TCF.

The Bibiyana gas field in Habiganj District is the country's largest gas field. Oil production in 2013 was 4,500 bbl/d against a demand of 119,000 bbl/d. As of 4 January 2024, Chevron currently produces around 1,232 million cubic feet per day (mmcfd) of gas from Bibiyana gas field. It is around 60% of the total output from local gas fields. It is estimated that round 1 trillion cubic feet (tfc) of natural gas reserves may be found in this gas field. The downstream sector in Bangladesh remains relatively under-developed.

Petrobangla is the principal energy company in Bangladesh. Its subsidiary, the Bangladesh Petroleum Exploration Company (BAPEX), is responsible for exploration activities. International oil companies must sell natural gas to Petrobangla at a government-determined price and are restricted in their ability to sell natural gas to customers directly. The gas distribution network is dominated by the Titas Gas company, as well as regional companies in North Bengal and Sylhet. Due to the energy crisis in recent years, Bangladesh has planned to import gas from Qatar to meet demands in the short-term. The country's first LNG Terminal will be built in Matarbari, Cox's Bazar for imports and will be a floating facility. Bangladesh plans to build a permanent LNG Terminal on Maheshkhali Island in the future.

Compressed Natural Gas (CNG) is widely used by vehicles in Bangladesh.

The Eastern Refinery in Chittagong is the country's largest oil refinery. The Bangladesh Petroleum Corporation is the state-owned holding company which regulates the market for petroleum products through its subsidiaries: the Jamuna Oil Company which is the country's largest distributor and was established in 1964 as Pakistan National Oil Limited; the Padma Oil Company which was formerly known as Burmah Eastern Limited, a subsidiary of Burmah Oil until 1977; and Meghna Petroleum Limited.

== See also ==
- Climate change in Bangladesh
- Standard Oil Company
