= Sunetra Gas Field =

Natural gas field in Bangladesh

- Country: Bangladesh
- Region: Sunamganj-Netrokona
- Offshore/onshore: onshore
- Operator: BAPEX
- Partner: Gazprom

Field history
- Discovery: 2009

Sunetra Gas Field (Bengali: সুনেত্র গ্যাসক্ষেত্র) is a natural gas field located in Sunamganj-Netrokona, Bangladesh. It is controlled by Bangladesh Petroleum Exploration and Production Company Limited (BAPEX).

== Location ==
Sunetra gas field is located in Gabi village of Selbarsha union, Dharmapasha Upazila, Sunamganj district of Sylhet Division and Barhatta Upazila of Netrokona district of Mymensingh Division. It is located 59km south-west of Chhatak gas field and 69km north-west of Bibiyana gas field. BAPEX conducted a two-dimensional seismic surveys in a total of 259 km in Sunamganj-Netrokona district in the year 2009-2010 and identified this gas field. 'Sunetra', the gas field's name, is a combination of the names of the two towns (Sunamganj and Netrakona) where it is located.

== See also ==
- List of natural gas fields in Bangladesh
- Bangladesh Gas Fields Company Limited
- Gas Transmission Company Limited
