= Maddhapara Granite Mining Company Limited =

- Abbreviation: MGMCL
- Formation: 1998
- Type: Government Organization
- Headquarters: Dinajpur, Bangladesh
- Region served: Bangladesh
- Official language: Bengali
- Parent organization: Petrobangla
- Website: mgmcl.org.bd

Maddhapara Granite Mining Company Limited (Bengali: মধ্যপাড়া গ্রানাইট মাইনিং কোম্পানি লিমিটেড) is a Bangladesh government owned granite mining company owned by Petrobangla.

== History ==
The Geological Survey of Bangladesh discovered granite deposits in Dinajpur District in 1974. SNC-Lavalin carried out a feasibility study on the site, and Nippon Koei Co., Ltd. published a detailed study. The government of Bangladesh signed an agreement with the government of North Korea. Petrobangla gave a turnkey contract to M/S Korea South South Corporation Corporation of North Korea to develop the Maddhapara Granite Rock Mine Project site. The project became Maddhapara Granite Mining Company Limited on 4 August 1998. On 25 May 2007, the North Korean company handed over the project to Maddhapara Granite Mining Company Limited which started operating the mine from 27 May 2007.

By July 2010, the Maddhapara Granite Mining Company Limited had 930 million taka with 240 million lost in 2009 alone.

In September 2015, the company stopped mining due to a shortage of equipment leaving one thousand workers without work.

Maddhapara Granite Mining Company Limited signed an agreement with Germania-Trest Consortium to develop the site further on 14 February 2014. The contractor performance was unsatisfactory and the companies had to go to an international tribunal to settle their disputes. Germania-Trest Consortium is a joint venture between Germania Corporation Limited, a Bangladeshi company, and JSC TrestShakhtosPetsstroy, a Belarusian company. The tenure of the company was extended by one year in February 2020. The tender to appoint a new contractor was delayed by the COVID-19 pandemic in Bangladesh. The mine was closed for six months due to the pandemic in 2020. Delays over a new contract led to a significant slowdown in production in August 2021 leading to more than one thousand trucks waiting to take rocks from the mine.

The company made a profit for the first time since it was founded from the 2018-2019 fiscal year at 70 million taka. The rock production had exceeded all expectations in 2018. In 2019, Barapukuria Coal Mining Company Limited managing director MD Fazlur Rahman was made the managing director of Maddhapara Granite Mining Company Limited.

The company made a profit of 220 million taka the 2019-2020 fiscal year.

In March 2022, Maddhapara Granite Mining Company Limited stopped mining activities due to a shortage of ammonium nitrate explosives. Production resumed on 28 March and stopped again on 1 May due to the lack of explosives. The company is responsible for supplying mega projects of the government. The dealers of the company were charging a high price for the rocks than the rate set by the company.

== Board of directors ==
- Nazmul Ahsan
- Abul Khayer Md. Aminur Rahman
- Md Hafizur Rahman Chowdhury
- Ali Iqbal Md. Nurullah
- Abdul Baqee Khan Majlis
- H. M. Khalid Iftekher
- Abu Daud Mohammad Fariduzzaman
