= Feni Gas Field =

Natural gas field in Bangladesh

- Country: Bangladesh
- Region: Feni
- Offshore/onshore: onshore
- Operator: Niko

Field history
- Discovery: 1981

Feni Gas Field (Bengali: ফেনী গ্যাসক্ষেত্র) is a natural gas field at Feni, Bangladesh. It is a subsidiary of a Canadian multinational company, Niko Resources.

== Location ==
Feni gas field is located at Dhliya union of Sadar upazila of Feni district of Chittagong Division.

== Discovery ==
Petrobangla discovered the gas field in 1981.

== See also ==
- List of natural gas fields in Bangladesh
- Bangladesh Gas Fields Company Limited
- Gas Transmission Company Limited
