= Jalalabad Gas Field =

Natural gas field in Bangladesh

- Location within Bangladesh
- Country: Bangladesh
- Region: Sylhet
- Offshore/onshore: onshore
- Coordinates: 24.9259°N 91.9130°E
- Operator: Chevron

Field history
- Discovery: 1989

Jalalabad Gas Field (Bengali: জালালাবাদ গ্যাসক্ষেত্র) is a natural gas field at Sylhet, Bangladesh. It is operated by Chevron, a leading US multinational company in the oil and gas sector.

== Location ==
Jalalabad gas field is located in the Lakkartura tea estate area of Sylhet.

== Discovery ==
Jalalabad gas field was discovered by an international oil company, Symeter, in 1989.

== Excavations and wells ==
Gas is being extracted from the field through three wells, namely Block-14-A JB-6, JB-7 and JB-9.

== See also ==
- List of natural gas fields in Bangladesh
- Bangladesh Gas Fields Company Limited
- Gas Transmission Company Limited
