= Sangu Gas Field =

Abandoned natural gas field in Bangladesh

- Country: Bangladesh
- Region: Bay of Bengal
- Offshore/onshore: offshore

Field history
- Discovery: 1994
- Start of production: 1996
- Abandonment: 2014

Sangu Gas Field (Bengali: সাঙ্গু গ্যাসক্ষেত্র) is a natural gas field in Bangladesh. The only offshore gas field in Bangladesh, it is currently abandoned. This gas field was discovered in 1996 in the Bay of Bengal 50 km from the Bangladesh coast near Silimpur, Chittagong. Santos, an Australian multinational company, was in charge of operations at the gas field. Its production was closed in 2014. To store the imported LNG, the government of Bangladesh is planning to convert the offshore gas field into an underground storage, where 487.91 billion cubic feet of gas can be stored. Currently in Bangladesh, there are 22 onshore blocks and 26 offshore blocks. Among these offshore blocks, 11 are shallow blocks, and the other 15 are deep-sea blocks.

== Gas production ==
In 1998, British oil company Cairn Energy started producing gas from Sangu Gas Field. It initially produces about 50 million cubic feet of gas daily. Later it increased up to 180 million cubic feet a day. Production levels dropped to an average of 49 million daily in 2009, and 18 million cubic feet per day on average in 2011. It was declared abandoned when gas production dropped from two to three million cubic feet daily at the end of the 2013. According to Petrobangla, about 488 billion cubic feet of gas is produced from this gas field from 1998 to 2014.

== See also ==
- List of natural gas fields in Bangladesh
- Bangladesh Gas Fields Company Limited
- Gas Transmission Company Limited
