= Narsingdi Gas Field =

Natural gas field in Bangladesh

- Location within Bangladesh
- Country: Bangladesh
- Region: Narsingdi
- Offshore/onshore: onshore
- Coordinates: 24.0088°N 90.7956°E
- Operator: Bangladesh Gas Fields Company Limited

Field history
- Discovery: 1990

Narsingdi Gas Field (Bengali: নরসিংদী গ্যাসক্ষেত্র) is a natural gas field located in Narsingdi District, Bangladesh. It is under the control of state-owned Bangladesh Gas Fields Company Limited.

== Location ==
Narsingdi gas field is located in Shibpur Upazila of the Narsingdi District of Dhaka Division, which is about 45 kilometres (28 mi) northeast of the capital Dhaka. It is adjacent to the Dhaka-Sylhet Highway.

== Discovery ==
This gas field was discovered in 1990 by Petrobangla, a state-owned company with the mandate to explore and manage oil, natural gas and other mineral resources.

== Excavations and wells ==
From this gas field, gas is lifted from one of the wells in a vertical depth of 11,320 feet and another well at a depth of 10,778 feet, of which gas levels range from 10,440 to 10,446 feet and to 10,427 to 10,470 feet deep, respectively.

== See also ==
- List of natural gas fields in Bangladesh
- Gas Transmission Company Limited
