= Shahbazpur Gas Field =

Natural gas field in Bangladesh

- Location within Bangladesh
- Country: Bangladesh
- Region: Bhola District
- Offshore/onshore: onshore
- Coordinates: 22.465°N 90.755°E
- Operator: Bangladesh Petroleum Exploration and Production Company Limited (BAPEX)
- Partner: Gazprom

Field history
- Discovery: 1994
- Start of production: 1995
- Peak of production: 1 TCF

Production
- Current production of gas: 40×10^{6} cu ft/d (1.1×10^{6} m^{3}/d)

Shahbazpur Gas Field (Bengali: শাহবাজপুর গ্যাসক্ষেত্র) is a natural gas field located in Bhola District of Bangladesh. It is controlled by Bangladesh Petroleum Exploration and Production Company Limited (BAPEX).

== Geology ==
Shahbazpur gas field is located in Shahbazpur area of Borhanganj union of Borhanuddin Upazila. BAPEX, a state-owned company, discovered it in 1995. It is about 32 km north of the Bhola North-1 Gas Field.

Shahbazpur gas field is in the Bengal basin area. The geological name of the ground structure is called 'stratigraphic Structure'. Other gas fields in the country have been discovered in the Surma Basin, that is called 'anti-cline structures.

== Discovery ==
According to the report of the Geology and Geophysics Limited, the availability of gas in Bhola was first known in 1952. Later, Pakistan Shell Oil Company Conducted a Single 2D Seismic surveys. After the independence of Bangladesh, a real seismic survey of the face-2 was conducted between 1974 and 1975. According to BAPEX source, the Shahbazpur gas field was found by a two-dimensional seismic survey in Bhola in 1986. BOGMC conducted a seismic survey in Fase-3A in 1987. According to the survey report, the excavation was started at Shahbazpur-1 gas field in 1994.

Based on the gas obtained from the gas field, 35.5 MW rental power plant and a power plant with a capacity of 225 MW have been set up at Bhola's Borhanuddin. Besides, gas is supplied from this gas field to the residential line of Bhola through the Sundarban Gas Company.

== See also ==
- List of natural gas fields in Bangladesh
- Bangladesh Gas Fields Company Limited
- Gas Transmission Company Limited
