= Bhola North-1 Gas Field =

Natural gas field in Bangladesh

- Country: Bangladesh
- Region: Bhola
- Offshore/onshore: onshore
- Operator: BAPEX

Field history
- Discovery: 2018

Bhola North-1 Gas Field (Bengali: ভোলা উত্তর-১ গ্যাসক্ষেত্র) is a natural gas field located in Bhola, Bangladesh. It is controlled by Bangladesh Petroleum Exploration and Production Company Limited (BAPEX).

== Location ==
Bhola North-1 gas field is located at Bheduria in Bhola district, Barisal Division. It is located 32 km away from Shahbazpur gas field. The field is estimated to hold 600 billion cubic feet (bcf) of gas reserves.

== See also ==
- List of natural gas fields in Bangladesh
- Bangladesh Gas Fields Company Limited
- Gas Transmission Company Limited
