= List of natural gas fields in Bangladesh =

As of September 2025, there are 30 natural gas fields in Bangladesh. The first gas field was discovered at Haripur, Sylhet in 1955 and the last gas field was discovered in the 2017 at Bhola. Titas gas field is the largest natural gas field in Bangladesh. It was discovered by the Pakistan Shell Oil Company in Brahmanbaria in the 1962. The first gas transmission was started in 1957.

== List ==
Reserves of natural gas fields (in trillions of cubic feet)
No.	Name of gas field	Year	Location	Discovered by	Total	Extractable	Extracted	Remaining
1	Haripur	1955	Sylhet	Burmah Oil	0.444	0.266	0.158	0.108
2	Chhatak	1959	Sunamganj District	Burmah Oil	1.900	1.140	0.029	1.113
3	Rashidpur	1960	Habiganj District	Pakistan Shell Oil Company	2.242	1.309	0.080	1.227
4	Kailashtila	1962	Sylhet	Pakistan Shell Oil Company	3.657	2.529	0.108	2.421
5	Titas	1962	Brahmanbaria District	Pakistan Shell Oil Company	4.132	2.100	0.353	1.747
6	Habiganj	1963	Habiganj District	Pakistan Shell Oil Company	3.669	1.895	0.567	1.328
7	Semutang	1969	Khagrachhari District	OGDC	0.164	0.098		0.098
8	Bakhrabad	1969	Cumilla	Pakistan Shell Oil Company	1.432	0.867	0.501	0.366
9	Kutubdia	1977	Cox's Bazar	Union Oil	0.780	0.468		0.468
10	Begumganj	1977	Noakhali District	Petrobangla	0.025	0.014		0.014
11	Beanibazar	1981	Sylhet	Petrobangla	0.243	0.113		0.113
12	Feni	1981	Feni District	Petrobangla	0.132	0.080	0.036	0.044
13	Kamta	1981	Gazipur District	Petrobangla	0.325	0.195	0.021	0.174
14	Jalalabad	1989	Sylhet	Simiter	1.500	0.900		0.900
15	Kulaura	1989	Moulvibazar District	Petrobangla	0.350	0.210		0.210
16	Meghna	1990	Brahmanbaria District	Petrobangla	0.194	0.126	0.004	0.080
17	Narsingdi	1990	Narsingdi District	Petrobangla				
18	Shahbazpur	1995	Bhola	BAPEX	0.504	0.333		0.333
19	Sangu	1996	Chittagong	Cairn Energy	1.031	0.848		
20	Salda	1996	Brahmanbaria District	BAPEX	0.200	0.140		
21	Moulvibazar	1997	Moulvibazar District	UNICOL	0.147	0.110		0.110
22	Bibiyana	1998	Habiganj District	UNICOL	2.4	1.77	1.77	
23	Lalmai	2005	Cumilla	Tallo				
24	Bangora	2005	Cumilla	BAPEX	0.457			
25	Sundalpur	2011	Noakhali District	BAPEX				
26	Sunetra	2011	Sunamganj District, Netrokona District	BAPEX				
27	Srikail	2012	Cumilla	BAPEX				
28	Pabna	2017	Pabna District	BAPEX				
29	Bhola North-1	2017	Bhola District	BAPEX	5.109			
30	Zakiganj	2021	Sylhet	BAPEX	0.048			

== See also ==
- List of countries by natural gas production
- List of natural gas fields
