= Titas Gas Field =

Natural gas field located in Brahmanbaria, Bangladesh

- Location within Bangladesh
- Country: Bangladesh
- Region: Brahmanbaria
- Offshore/onshore: onshore
- Coordinates: 23.9167°N 90.95°E
- Operator: BGFCL

Field history
- Discovery: 1962
- Start of production: 1968

Production
- Current production of gas: 300×10^{6} cu ft/d (8.5×10^{6} m^{3}/d)
- Estimated gas in place: 4.13×10^{9} cu ft (117×10^{6} m^{3})

Titas Gas Field (Bengali: তিতাস গ্যাসক্ষেত্র) is a natural gas field located in Brahmanbaria, Bangladesh. The largest gas field in Bangladesh, around 300 million cubic feet of gas is being extracted from it daily. It is a subsidiary of Bangladesh Gas Fields Company Limited (BGFCL). The geo-structure of the gas field area is dome-shaped, with an area of about 64 square kilometers.

== History ==
It was discovered in 1962, and commercially started gas production from April 1968. On 20 November 1964, the gas field was established as Titus Gas Transmission and Distribution Company Limited. Located in Brahmanbaria, this gas field was discovered by Pakistan Shell Oil Company. It would be connected through a transmission pipeline to transport regassified LNG to Chittagong and Bakhrabad. In 2006, BGFCL first found gas seepages in the southeastern part of Titas gas field near Titas river. In 2019, a fire hampered gas supply for half an hour to the national grid.

== See also ==
- List of natural gas fields in Bangladesh
- Bangladesh Gas Fields Company Limited
- Gas Transmission Company Limited
