= Kutubdia Gas Field =

Natural gas field in Bangladesh

- Country: Bangladesh
- Region: Cox's Bazar
- Offshore/onshore: offshore
- Operator: BAPEX

Field history
- Discovery: 1977

Kutubdia Gas Field (Bengali: কুতুবদিয়া গ্যাসক্ষেত্র) is a natural gas field located in the Bay of Bengal of Cox's Bazar, Bangladesh. It is controlled by Bangladesh Petroleum Exploration and Production Company Limited (BAPEX).

== Production ==
It is a miniature gas field as estimated. According to calculations, the total gas reserves in this gas field are 780 billion cubic feet (BCF). No gas is currently being extracted from this gas field; because of the scarcity of its stock, it has not been brought into production.

== See also ==
- List of natural gas fields in Bangladesh
- Bangladesh Gas Fields Company Limited
- Gas Transmission Company Limited
