= Habiganj Gas Field =

Natural gas field in Bangladesh

- Location within Bangladesh
- Country: Bangladesh
- Region: Habiganj
- Offshore/onshore: onshore
- Coordinates: 24.14°N 91.22°E
- Operator: Bangladesh Gas Fields Company Limited

Field history
- Discovery: 1963

Habiganj Gas Field (Bengali: হবিগঞ্জ গ্যাসক্ষেত্র) is a natural gas field located in Habiganj district of Bangladesh. It is controlled by the state-owned Bangladesh Gas Fields Company Limited.

== Location ==
Habiganj gas field is located in Madhabpur upazila, Habiganj district, Sylhet Division, which is about 100 km northeast of the capital Dhaka. It covers an area that is 11 km long and 4.5 km wide.

== Discovery ==
Pakistan Shell Oil Company discovered the gas field in 1963.

== Excavations and wells ==
From this gas field, ten wells ranging from a depth of 5,100 feet to 11,500 feet were excavated vertically, and another at a depth of 11,552 feet, excavated in a perpendicular way, of which gas was extracted at different times, which are situated 4,357 to 9,910 feet under the ground.

== Stock and extraction ==
Habiganj is one of the largest gas fields in the country. According to Petrobangla's estimation, the total reserves of gas extracted is 2,787 billion cubic feet (BCF). The gas has been extracted since 1968, but the presence of excessive water had hampered gas production from four Habiganj wells. Currently, an average of 225 million cubic feet of gas is extracted daily. As of mid-2019, the gas field has only 345.5 billion cubic feet of gas remaining.

== See also ==
- List of natural gas fields in Bangladesh
- Gas Transmission Company Limited
