= A. B. M. Abdul Fattah =

Bangladeshi civil servant

A. B. M. Abdul Fattah (Bengali: এ বি এম আবদুল ফাত্তাহ্), full name Abul Bashar Mohammed Abdul Fattah, is a Bangladesh civil servant and former chairman of Petrobangla.

== Career ==
Fattah joined the Bangladesh Civil Service in 1989 as an administration cadre.

In September 2005, Fattah raided restaurants in Uttara and fined them for producing food in unhygienic conditions.

In 2007, as magistrate of Dhaka Metropolitan, Fattah ordered the confiscation of the properties of Sheikh Rehana, sister of former Prime Minister Sheikh Hasina. In October 2007, he issued an arrest warrant against her. Sheikh Fazlul Karim Selim gave a confession statement to him in which he claimed to have shared extorted money with Sheikh Hasina.

Fattah served as the secretary of Bangladesh Atomic Energy Commission. During his term, he officially visited Australia, Mongolia, and Austria twice for training purposes.

In 2015, Fattah was the project director of the Bangladesh Economic Zones Authority.

In 2019, Fattah represented Bangladesh at the United Nations Economic and Social Commission for Asia and the Pacific.

Fattah was an additional secretary at the Energy and Mineral Resources Division. On 13 January 2020, he was appointed Chairman of Petrobangla. On 12 October 2020, Fattah was promoted to secretary along with SM Harun-ur-Rashid, Director General of Bangladesh Television, and Ram Chandra Das, Chairman of Bangladesh Tourism Corporation. He presided over the signing of an agreement between Petrobangla and Jalalabad Gas Transmission and Distribution System Limited in July 2020. He signed an agreement to pay suppliers through HSBC Bank. He signed an agreement with Gazprom on behalf of Petrobangla to develop gas exploration in Bangladesh along with Bangladesh Petroleum Exploration and Production Company Limited. Fattah and Md. Anisur Rahman, Secretary of Energy, briefed the media on the plan to disconnect all illegal gas connections in September 2020 following orders by Nasrul Hamid to do so in two months.

In June 2021, Fattah signed an agreement to import LNG from Indian Oil Corporation Limited, a state-owned Indian oil company. Fattah refused to talk to the media about the deal. Fattah chaired the 34th Annual General Meeting of Petrobangla in November 2021. He was replaced by Nazmul Ahsan as chairman of Petrobangla in December 2021.
