= Abul Bashar (disambiguation) =

Abul Bashar (Bengali: আবুল বশর) is a Bengali given name and alias of Arabic origin. It may refer to:

- Abul Bashar Mohammed Abdul Fattah, civil servant and former chairman of Petrobangla
- Abul Bashar Mohammed Khurshid Alam, surgeon and chief of the Directorate General of Health Services
- Abul Bashar Murshidabadi (born 1951), novelist
- Mohammed Abul Bashar Shaikh (born 1986), first-class cricketer
- Abul Basar Akand, politician
- Abul Basar Sikder, politician

== See also ==
- Abu al-Qasim
