= Meghna Gas Field =

Natural gas field in Bangladesh

- Location within Bangladesh
- Country: Bangladesh
- Region: Brahmanbaria
- Offshore/onshore: onshore
- Coordinates: 23.8383°N 90.7886°E
- Operator: Bangladesh Gas Fields Company Limited

Field history
- Discovery: 1990

Meghna Gas Field (Bengali: মেঘনা গ্যাসক্ষেত্র) is a natural gas field located in Brahmanbaria District of Bangladesh. It is under the control of Bangladesh Gas Fields Company Limited. Petrobangla discovered the gas field in 1990.

== Location ==
Meghna gas field is located in Bancharampur Upazila, Brahmanbaria district, Chittagong Division, which is about 40 km northeast of Dhaka. It is located on the Meghna floodplain north of the Bakhrabad gas field.

== Excavations and wells ==
From here, the gas is extracted through a well depth of 10,079 feet excavated vertically, which long-strings are 9,912 to 9,948 feet, and the short-strings are 9,744 to 9,761 feet underground.

== Stock and production ==
It is a medium-ranged gas field. According to Petrobangla's estimation, the total reserves of gas extracted from the field is 101 billion cubic feet (BCF). From 1997, gas was started extracting at a rate of 20 million cubic feet per day, but due to excessive water production, gas production was halted from 10 August 2007; however, on an average 12 million cubic feet of gas is being extracted at a daily-basis by tth short-strings.

At present, the gas field has only 31.3 billion cubic feet of gas remaining.

== See also ==
- List of natural gas fields in Bangladesh
- Bangladesh Gas Fields Company Limited
- Gas Transmission Company Limited
