= Barapukuria Coal Mining Company Limited =

Bangladeshi coal mining company

- Abbreviation: BCMCL
- Formation: 1998
- Purpose: Coal
- Headquarters: Dhaka, Bangladesh
- Region served: Bangladesh
- Official language: Bengali
- Website: bcmcl.org.bd

Barapukuria Coal Mining Company Limited (Bengali: বড়পুকুরিয়া কোল মাইনিং কোম্পানী লিমিটেড) is a Bangladesh government owned coal mining company. Engineer Md. Kamruzzaman Khan is the managing director of the company. Nazmul Ahsan is the chairman of the board of directors of the company.

== History ==
In 1985, the Geological Survey of Bangladesh discovered Barapukuria coal mine in Dinajpur District. Wardell Armstrong carried out a feasibility study on the mine. The site was developed through a turnkey project by China National Machinery Import and Export Corporation for Barapukuria Coal Mining Company Limited. Barapukuria coal mine has about 390 million ton deposit.

Barapukuria Coal Mining Company Limited was established in August 1998 and started production in 2005. The coal from the station is used to power the Barapukuria Power Station. In October 2006, production stopped due to fund shortage. On 27 February 2008, the Anti-Corruption Commission filed a corruption case against former Prime Minister Khaleda Zia and 15 others including 10 former government ministers over awarding the contract to the China National Machinery Import and Export Corporation instead of the lowest bidder Shandong Ludi Consortium.

In 2006, China National Machinery Import and Export Corporation and Hosaf Group attracted criticism over their management of the mine.

The company stopped production in February 2009 due to protests by locals whose house had been damaged by mining. The company had operated a loss every year since production began in 2005 to 2009. In April 2009, Albert Banes Davis, a British consultant of the company died inside the mine. By January 2009, more than 4 square kilometer of the land surrounding the mine had subsided. The company did not have a fund for compensating the impact people. Over 81 homes in five villages near the mine were damaged. Since production began they paid 2.4 million in damages until 2009. A meeting led by Tawfiq-e-Elahi Chowdhury started to plan out a compensation plan for the locals. In August 2018, the powerplant shutdown due to the failure of Barapukuria Coal Mining Company Limited to supply enough coal. The miners also went on a strike over retrenchment. The workers resolved their despite after talking with the company officials. Mostafizur Rahman Fizar, State Minister of the forests and environment, visited the site and told the locals that they will receive fair compensation for the damage due to the mine. The company resumed coal production on 8 March 2009. The ambassador of China to Bangladesh, Zheng Qingdian, visited Prime Minister Sheikh Hasina and expressed concerns about labor unrest at the mine on 5 May 2009. Following the meeting the government deployed 120 personnel of Bangladesh Army to prevent labor unrest and provided security to the mine and Chinese China National Machinery Import and Export Corporation officials. On 23 May 2009, the locals signed a compensation deal with the mining company. In November 2009, the Ministry of Finance allocated 3 billion taka for the rehabilitation of those whose homes were damaged due to the mine. On 11 September 2009, the workers at the mine went on strike led by the president of Barapukuria Coalmine Workers' Union Md Rabiul Islam but 300 Chinese workers at the mine continued working. One miner was killed and another 19 were trapped following a collapse at the mine on 11 May 2010. On 27 March 2010, workers of the Chinese contractor of the mine went on strike demanding a raise and burned an effigy of Mostafizur Rahman Fizar. In July 2010, the locals laid seize to the mine over damage to their property. The Power Division considered raising the price of coal in 2011.

The company raised coal prices in 2012. In July 2012, clashes broke out between locals seeking compensation and the police. On 13 June 2013, the workers at the mine went on an indefinite strike.

The company reduced the price of coal in June 2016.

In July 2017, the company stopped selling coal despite strong demand and having inventory.

On 17 July 2018, a director of Bangladesh Power Development Board, the largest customer of the company, visited the coal mine to determine if it could a source for coals in new powerplants. The director found three thousand ton of coal instead of the 147 thousand ton that was supposed to be in the coal yard. Barapukuria Coal Mining Company Limited filed a case with the Parbatipur Police Station regarding the missing coal against 19 including for managing director Habib Uddin Ahmed at the directive of Nasrul Hamid, State Minister of Power, Energy, and Mineral Resource. Habib Uddin Ahmed was removed from the post of managing director and made an officer on special duty. Anti Corruption Commission deputy director, Abu Hena Ashiqur Rahman, also filed a case over the missing coal against officials of the company including four former managing director of the coal mining company. The commission had launched their own probe and interrogated current and former employees of the coal company. It interrogated former managing director of the company, Khorshedul Hasan. Petrobangla formed an investigative committee on 28 August 2018. The former managing director of the company, Habib Uddin Ahmed, reported the day before the committee was formed that the missing coal was the result of system loss. In September 2019, a Petrobangla investigation reported that the missing coal was the result of system loss and accounted for 1.42 percent of total production. All the former managing directors of the company were detained and sent to jail over the missing coal.

In May 2018, Miners and villagers jointly raised their demands for the company at a joint press conference calling for compensation for the victims of land subsided and raise wages and facilities of the workers. On 15 May miners and villagers clashed with company officials and Bangladesh Police leaving 10 injured. In March 2019, the company stopped coal production due to its failure to pay it's Chinese subcontractors.

On 18 July 2019, managing director of the Barapukuria Coal Mining Company Limited, MD Fazlur Rahman, was transferred to Maddhapara Granite Mining Company Limited and was declared unwanted by the employees of the Barapukuria Coal Mining Company Limited.

On 14 January 2021, 22 accused of the Barapukuria Coal Mining Company Limited over the missing coal case were denied bail. The company announced further expansion in the northern area of the mines. Bangladesh High Court allowed the trial proceedings to begin in the case on 8 February 2022 filed against former officials of the Barapukuria Coal Mining Company Limited with the Parbatipur Police Station. On 29 April 2022, the workers demonstrated demanding payment of arrears.

== Board of directors ==
- Nazmul Ahsan
- Dr. Badrul Imam
- SK Akter Hossain
- A. K. M. Benjamin Riazi
- Ali Mohd. Al-Mamun
- Nizam Uddin Ahmed
- Md. Kamruzzaman Khan
