= Abul Hasanat =

Abul Hasanat, also spelt Abul Hasnat, is a given name and alias of Arabic origin. It may refer to:

- Abul Hasanat Abdullah Naqshbandi (1872–1964), South Indian Islamic scholar
- Abul Hasnat Muhammad Qamaruzzaman (1926–1975), first Home Minister of Bangladesh
- Abul Hasanat Abdullah (born 1944), second Chief Whip of the Bangladesh Parliament
- Abul Hasnat Muhammad Abdul Hai (died 2010), Bangladeshi parliamentarian
- Abul Hasnat Sardar (1940–2022), barrister and first Mayor of Dhaka, Bangladesh
- Abul Hasnat Mahmud al Zaman (1945–2020), Bangladeshi journalist, writer and editor
- Abul Hasnat Khan (1946–2021), Marxist member of the West Bengal Legislative Assembly
- Dr. Abul Hasnat Hajipuri (1955–2019), physician and former member of the West Bengal Legislative Assembly
- Abul Hasnat Muhammad Khairuzzaman Liton (born 1959), tenth Mayor of Rajshahi, Bangladesh
- Abul Hasnat Mohammad Khairul Bashar (born 1970), major general of the Bangladesh Army
- Abul Hasnat Jangipuri, member of the West Bengal Legislative Assembly
- Abul Hasnat Chandpuri, Bangladeshi educationist and former MP
- Abul Hasnat Chowdhury, Bangladeshi parliamentarian
- Abul Hasnat Zulqarnain, Pakistani jurist

== See also ==
- Abul Bashar (disambiguation)
