= Bangora Gas Field =

Natural gas field in Bangladesh

Bangara Gas Field
- Location within Bangladesh
- Country: Bangladesh
- Region: Cumilla
- Offshore/onshore: onshore
- Operator: BAPEX

Field history
- Discovery: 1996

Bangara Gas Field (Bengali: বাঙ্গরা গ্যাসক্ষেত্র) is a natural gas field located in Cumilla, Bangladesh. It is controlled by the state-owned Bangladesh Petroleum Exploration and Production Company Limited (BAPEX).

== Location ==
Bangara Gas Field is located at 23.7107°N 90.9841°E, in Bangara Upazila, Cumilla District, Chattogram Division. It is located about 7 kilometres (4.3 mi) away from the Srikail gas field. These two fields cover an area of 140 square kilometres (54 sq mi).

== See also ==
- List of natural gas fields in Bangladesh
- Bangladesh Gas Fields Company Limited
- Gas Transmission Company Limited
