= Beanibazar Gas Field =

Natural gas field in Bangladesh

- Location within Bangladesh
- Country: Bangladesh
- Region: Sylhet
- Offshore/onshore: onshore
- Coordinates: 24.7971°N 92.1670°E
- Operator: Sylhet Gas Fields Limited

Field history
- Discovery: 1981

Beanibazar Gas Field (Bengali: বিয়ানীবাজার গ্যাসক্ষেত্র) is a natural gas field at Sylhet, Bangladesh. The gas field was found in 1981 and has two wells. The extraction started in 1991 and was closed in 2014. It was resumed in 2016 but again closed down. It is controlled by Sylhet Gas Fields Limited.

== Location ==
Beanibazar Gas Field is located at Jalup Mouza (Location-1) of Mollapur Union and Suptala village (Location-2) of the municipality of Beanibazar Upazila of Sylhet.

== See also ==
- List of natural gas fields in Bangladesh
- Bangladesh Gas Fields Company Limited
- Gas Transmission Company Limited
