= Fyaz Hussain Khan =

Bangladeshi geologist

Fyaz Hussain Khan (1924–1991) was a Bangladesh geologist.

== Early life ==
Khan was born on 10 February 1924 in Kolkata, West Bengal, British India. He was educated in The Calcutta Madrasa. He completed his B.A. and M.A. in geology from the Presidency College, Kolkata.

== Career ==
In 1946 he joined the Geological Survey of India. He started his PhD program at the University of London in 1947 on a scholarship and finished his PhD in structural and field geology. His PhD thesis was on Red Sandstone Formation in County Kerry, Ireland. In 1950 he joined the Geological Survey of Pakistan as its senior geologist. He work on the mineral resources of Bangladesh and created plans for their development. He was deputised to the East Pakistan Industrial Development Corporation. After Bangladesh became an independent country he was made the chairman of Bangladesh Mineral Exploration and Development Corporation. He served in the Mineral Division as its secretary. Khan taught in the Geology Department of the University of Dhaka. In 1975 he retired from government service. From 1976 to 1977 he served as the President of Bangladesh Geological Society. He was a fellow in the Geological Society of London. He wrote a number of papers and books on the geography of Bangladesh.

== Death ==
Khan died on 3 September 1991.
