= Jalal Ahmed =

Jalal Ahmed may refer to:

- Jalal Ahmad, Bangladeshi architect
- Jalal Ahmed (politician), Bangladeshi politician
- Jalal Ahmed (bureaucrat), Bangladeshi civil servant
