= TMSS =

TMSS may refer to:

- Two-Micron Sky Survey, an infrared astronomical survey and catalog
- Taiwanese Modern Spelling System, the basis for the Modern Literal Taiwanese orthography
- Trademark Security System, a copyright protection mechanism used by Sega that was subject of the 1992 Sega v. Accolade court case
- Thengamara Mohila Sabuj Sangha, third largest non-governmental organisation (NGO) in Bangladesh
