= Md. Nurul Amin =

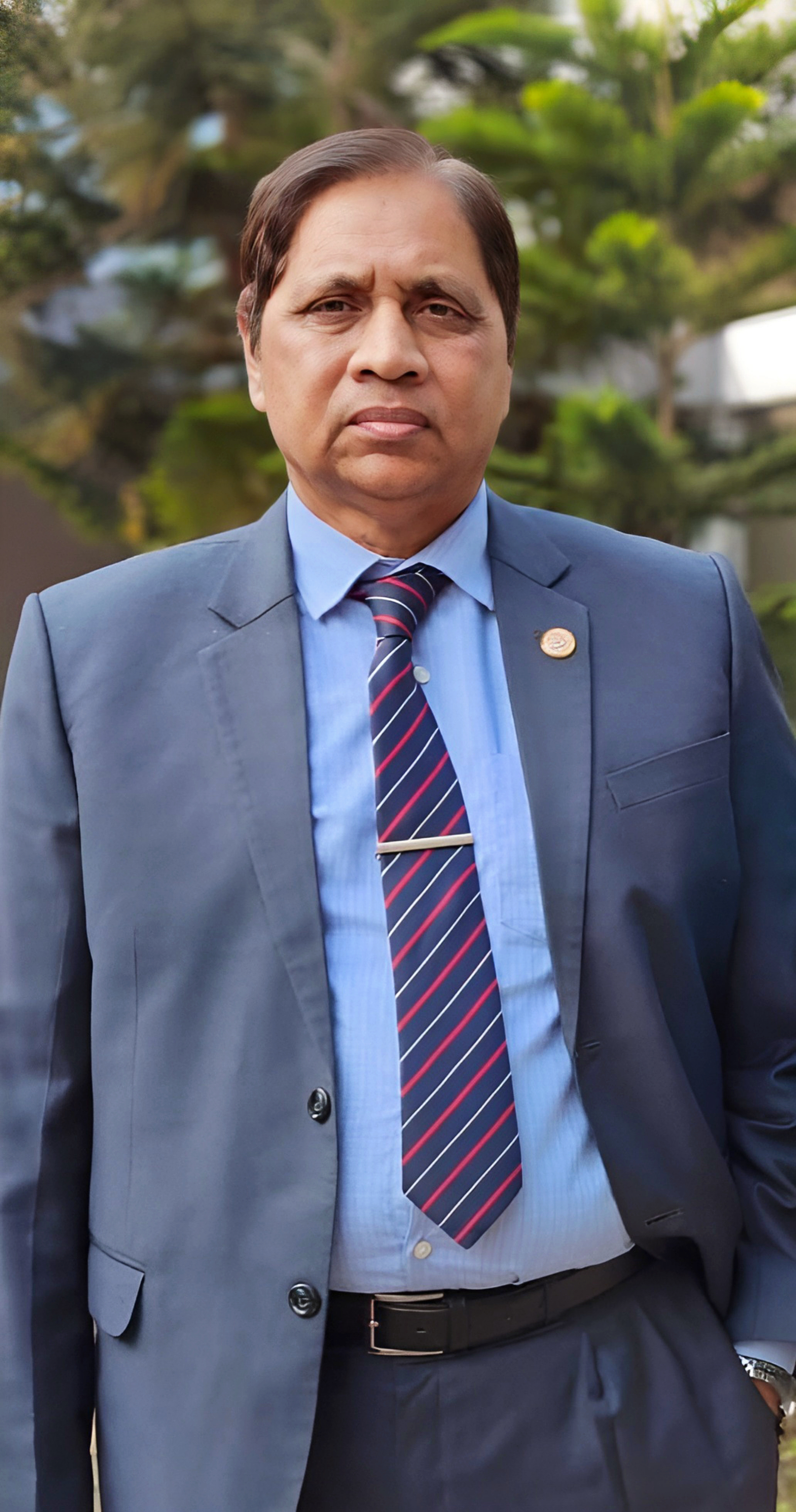

Chairman Bangladesh Energy Regulatory Commission
- In office 22 March 2023 – 20 August 2024
- Prime Minister: Muhammad Yunus; Sheikh Hasina
- Preceded by: Md. Abdul Jalil
- Succeeded by: Jalal Ahmed

Senior Secretary Planning Division
- In office 5 February 2019 – 3 June 2020
- Minister: M. Abdul Mannan
- Preceded by: Md. Ziaul Islam
- Succeeded by: Md. Asadul Islam

Personal details
- Born: 10 June 1961 (age 65) Faridganj Upazila, Chandpur District, East Pakistan (present day Bangladesh)
- Children: 3
- Education: University of Dhaka
- Occupation: Government official

Md. Nurul Amin is a retired government official who is the former Chairman of the Bangladesh Energy Regulatory Commission. Prior to joining, he served as the Chairman of Karmasangsthan Bank. He also served as the Senior Secretary of Ministry of Planning as well as the Secretary of Ministry of Chittagong Hill Tracts Affairs.

== Early life ==
Nurul Amin was born on 10 June 1961 in Aitpara, Paschim Subidpur Union, Faridganj Upazila, Chandpur District, East Pakistan, Pakistan. He did his master's degree from the University of Dhaka in management.

== Career ==
Nurul Amin joined the BCS Administration Cadre in the 1984 batch and started his career as an Assistant Commissioner on 21 January 1986, in the office of the Divisional Commissioner's office Dhaka. Initially, he served as an Assistant Commissioner and a First-Class Magistrate in the office of the Deputy Commissioner's office, Dhaka. Subsequently, he took on various roles in the field administration, including Assistant Commissioner (Land) in the Sadarpur Upazila of Faridpur District, Upazila Magistrate in the Rajoir Upazila of Madaripur District, Land Revenue Officer in the Jhalokati District, and Upazila Nirbahi Officer in the Louhajang Upazila of Munshiganj District and Ramganj Upazila of Lakshmipur District.

Subsequently, Nurul Amin took on responsibilities as the Secretary of the District Councils in Manikganj, Netrokona, Mymensingh, and Kishoreganj, as the Additional Deputy Commissioner in Faridpur District, as the Director (Training) in the Directorate of Primary Education, and as the Project Director of the "Flood-Affected School Construction Project." On 16 March 2009, he was posted as the Deputy Commissioner and District Magistrate in Netrokona and later in Jashore district. During his tenure as the DC of Netrokona, he was the president of Birishiri Upajatiya Cultural Academy in Netrokona. He was promoted to the position of Joint Secretary and joined the Ministry of Religious Affairs. Later, he assumed the highest position in field administration as the Divisional Commissioner in the Barisal Division. During his tenure as Divisional Commissioner, he was promoted to the position of Additional Secretary and took on the responsibility as the Managing Director of the Prime Minister's Education Assistance Trust in March 2014. Subsequently, in March 2018, he served as the Secretary of the Ministry of Chittagong Hill Tracts Affairs and the Ministry of Planning, and was promoted to the rank of Senior Secretary. After a long career, he retired on 9 June 2020.

Nurul Amin was appointed chairman of Karmasangsthan Bank in April 2022.

On 22 March 2023, Nurul Amin was appointed chairman of the Bangladesh Energy Regulatory Commission in the rank of a judge of Appellate Division of the Supreme Court of Bangladesh, responsible for regulating the prices of fuel and electricity, for a three-year term.

On 20 August 2024, after the fall of the Awami League government due to the student–people uprising, he resigned in the face of protests from officials and employees.
