= Barapukuria coal scam =

2018 scandal in Bangladesh

Barapukuria coal scam is a sensational corruption scandal of Bangladesh concerning the misappropriation of around 1.42 hundred thousand tons of coal, worth over BDT 227 billion by officials of Barapukuria Coal Mining Company Limited (BCMCL) from the coal mine of Barapukuria, Dinajpur District, in northern Bangladesh.

The scandal was revealed in July 2018 when a board member of Bangladesh Power Development Board went to visit the coal mine and found no fresh coal whereas according to the document there should have been around 142 hundred thousand tons of coal reserved. The matter came in light when a Bangladeshi English-language daily reported the incident.

Petrobangla, the parent organization of the BCMCL, promptly suspended a few officials in this connection while the Anti-Corruption Commission started an inquiry to trace the corruption.

Barapukuria's coal-fired power plant suspended its operation due to the shortage of coal as an immediate effect of this corruption.

== Background ==
The Geological Survey of Bangladesh, an autonomous body, discovered the presence of a coalmine at Barapukuria area of the Parbatipur upazila of Dinajpur district. The government then invited UK based M/S Wardell Armstrong and China-based China National Machinery Import and Export Corporation to conduct a detailed study on the feasibility of mining in the area.

Both organizations confirmed the presence of high-quality bituminous coal in the mine. As a result, to extract coal from the mine, Petrobangla undertook Barapukuria Coal Mine Development project and to ensure proper implementation of the project and smooth functioning of the mine operation, Barapukuria Coal Mining Company Limited was formed and registered as a company on 4 August 1998.

The coal mine was inaugurated in 2001, and a thermal power plant run by coal was built and commissioned in 2006. According to the documents, till June 2018, the coal mine has extracted 10.17 million tons of coal.

== Revelation of the corruption ==
On 16 July 2018, Abu Sayeed, a board member of Bangladesh Power Development Board, went to Barapukuria in an official visit where he cross checked the documents of mining and supplying from the coal mine since 2001.

The official documents of the mine say at least 10.17 million tons of coal were extracted from the mine, around 6.69 million of which were supplied to the power plant, 3.32 million tons to various industries and 12,000 tons was used for the project's own needs. That adds up to around 10.02 million tons.

The official documents revealed that around 0.15 million tons are missing.

Mr. Sayeed reported the misappropriation to Petrobangla, a government-owned autonomous organization that supervises mines in Bangladesh. Petrobangla, in an immediate response to this, withdrew the managing director Habib Uddin Ahmed and general manager Abul Kashem Prodhania of BCMCL. The organization suspended Abu Taher Md. Nur-Uz Zaman Chowdhury, general manager (mine operation), and Khaledul Islam, deputy general manager (store) for negligence.

Bangladesh's prominent English-language daily The Daily Star reported the incident of coal misappropriation and suspension of officials on its 21 July 2018 edition. This brought the issue to the public eye and garnered national attention.

== Criticism ==
The misappropriation of such a huge amount of coal drew flak from all quarters.

The state minister of Power, Energy and Mineral Resources, Mr. Nasrul Hamid MP alleged that the "entire Barapukuria mine staff" were involved in this corruption.

Barrister Moudud Ahmed, a national standing committee member of Bangladesh's largest opposition party, the Bangladesh Nationalist Party, branded the disappearance of a huge amount of coal from Barapukuria as the ‘biggest scandal’ of the Awami League government.

The Transparency International Bangladesh (TIB) along with the Bangladesh Environmental Lawyers Association (BELA) asked for the formation of a neutral and acceptable committee to investigate the scam and to ensure punishment of the culprits.

== Response ==
On 23 July 2018, Bangladesh's corruption watchdog Anti-Corruption Commission declared the beginning of an investigation into the corruption. The commission also issued a letter to the emigration police asking them not to allow the four suspended officials of the mine to leave the country until the investigation is completed.

A case was filed in relation with coal scam against 19 officials including Habib Uddin Ahmed, former managing director of Barapukuria Coal Mining Company Limited by the coalmine's Manager (administration) Anisur Rahman on 25 July.

The Petrobangla initiated inquiry was said to have found the involvement of four former high-ranking officials of the minefield. The four officials included incumbent Managing Director Habib Uddin Ahmed, former managing director SM Nurul Aurangajeb, Md Kamruzzaman, who is also a former managing director, and Md Aminuzzaman, another former managing director.

However, the claim was refuted and according to a high official of Petrobanlga, no one was named in the probe report.

== Aftermath ==
The probe is still ongoing.

The Anti-Corruption Commission interrogated the former managing director (MD) of Barapukuria Coal Mining Company Limited (BCMCL) SM Nurul Aurangzeb over the ‘disappearance of coal’ from Barapukuria coal mine.

One of those accused, Md Abul Quashem Pradhania, however, blamed “system loss” for the disappearance of coal from the mine. He explained, “coal extracted from a mine is usually wet and it gets thinner as it dries up over time.”

Bangladesh Power Development Board, due to an acute shortage of coal, shut down the Barapukuria thermal power plant in Dinajpur on 22 July. The sudden shut down resulted in irregular electricity supply to the northern region of Bangladesh that include Rangpur, Panchagarh, Nilphamari, Lalmonirhat, Kurigram, Gaibandha, Dinajpur and Thakurgaon districts.

While awaiting to resume the operation, the government of Bangladesh has sought trade with other countries to fill their need for coal.
