= Energy Security Fund =

- Formation: 2015
- Headquarters: Dhaka, Bangladesh
- Region served: Bangladesh
- Official language: Bengali

Energy Security Fund is a Bangladesh government fund that was formed to fund gas exploration and extraction projects in Bangladesh. It is funded through a fee on domestic gas bills.

== History ==
Energy Security Fund was established in September 2015 by Energy and Mineral Resources Division of the Ministry of Power, Energy and Mineral Resources. It is managed by Petrobangla. Its creation was approved by Bangladesh Energy Regulatory Commission. The fund had over 70 billion taka in 2017.
