= Mezbahuddin Ahmed =

Mezbahuddin Ahmed may refer to:

- Masbah Ahmmed (born 1995), Bangladeshi sprinter
- Mezbahuddin Ahmed (geologist) (1920–2002), Bangladeshi educationalist and geologist
