= Kutubdia (disambiguation) =

Kutubdia may also refer to:

- Kutubdia Upazila, a upazila of Cox’s Bazar District.
- Kutubdia Dwip, an island in Bay of Bengal.
- Kutubdia Gas Field, a gas field in Bangladesh.
- Kutubdia Beach, a sea beach in Cox's Bazar District.
