= Thengamara Mohila Sabuj Sangha =

Bangladeshi nonprofit organisation

- Formation: 1964
- Type: NGO
- Headquarters: Dhaka, Bangladesh
- Region served: Bangladesh
- Official language: Bengali
- Executive Director: Hosne-Ara Begum
- Website: tmss-bd.org

Thengamara Mohila Sabuj Sangha (Bengali: ঠেঙ্গামারা মহিলা সবুজ সংঘ), TMSS, is a Bangladeshi non-profit that works for the advancement of women in Northern Bangladesh. It is the third largest non-governmental organisation (NGO) in Bangladesh.

Gulnahar Parveen is chairwoman of the Thengamara Mohila Sabuj Sangha. It is based in Bogura while headquartered in Dhaka. It operates Rafatullah Community Hospital in Bogra District. It is a sister organization of the Palli Karma Sahayak Foundation.

== History ==
Thengamara Mohila Sabuj Sangha was established in 1964 by female beggars. The beggars were organized by Jomela Bewa and Fatema Bewa of Thengamara Village in Bogra District. The organization was formed following the advice of social welfare officer Abdul Mazid. Women started saving with the organization which spread to six villages after the Independence of Bangladesh.

Hosne Ara Begum, a trans woman, took over and reformed the organization in 1980. She received the Begum Rokeya Padak in 2007.

By 1999, Thengamara Mohila Sabuj Sangha had developed operations in 342 unions in 88 Upazila of 17 Districts provided services to 3.2 million families.

In October 2009, Pashchimanchal Gas Company Limited ordered TMSS CNG Limited and TMSS CNG Refuelling Station, subsidiaries of Thengamara Mohila Sabuj Sangha, pay more for gas for illegally selling electricity produced using the gas meant for the fuel station.

Japan provided a grant of 7 million BDT to Thengamara Mohila Sabuj Sangha in May 2020. It signed an agreement with bKash to provide microfinancing through the mobil wallet service. It established Momo Inn in Bogra as a luxury hotel.

The Daily Star wrote that the Sangha was illegally dumping toxic waste on Korotoa River. It was illegally extracting sand from the Korotoa river due to which its pumps were seized by the Bogura District Administration. Eastern Bank Limited helped raise 1.2 billion BDT for the Thengamara Mohila Sabuj Sangha through issuing bonds.

In March 2023, it was fined one million BDT for illegally blocking Korotoa river by constructing a road.
