= Pashchimanchal Gas Company Limited =

Pashchimanchal Gas Company Limited (PGCL)
- Formation: 29 November 1999
- Headquarters: Nalka,Sirajganj
- Region served: Rajshahi and Rangpur division
- Official language: Bengali
- Parent organization: Petrobangla
- Website: www.pgcl.org.bd

Pashchimanchal Gas Company Limited (Bengali: পশ্চিমাঞ্চল গ্যাস কোম্পানী লিমিটেড) is a Bangladesh government owned natural gas company responsible for supplying natural gas in the north-western part of Bangladesh.

== History ==
Pashchimanchal Gas Company Limited was established on 29 November 1999 under Petrobangla. The company would distribute natural gas in Rajshahi Division.

In May 2008, the manager of Pashchimanchal Gas Company Limited, Kazi Nowfel Anwar, bought a car with company money and registered it in his name. When the matter came to light the car burned down inside the company garage and the insurance company refused to pay due to the suspicious circumstances of the fire. In 2009, private power generation company GBB Power Limited was declared a defaulter for not paying the bills of the gas company. The company defaulted again next year.

In 2013, Pashchimanchal Gas Company Limited installed a gas distribution network in Rajshahi by digging up the roads but did not repair the road which left them in a state of disrepair. The city received gas connection in 2012.

Pashchimanchal Gas Company Limited, under managing director Abdul Mannan Patwary, asked for 2.58 billion taka from the government to establish a gas pipeline from Rajshahi to Saidpur. It would be a 150 kilometer pipeline at a cost of 13.59 billion taka and is expected to be completed in December 2023.

Pashchimanchal Gas Company Limited asked for a raise to the price of gas leading Bangladesh Energy Regulatory Commission to hold a three-day public hearing at the Bangladesh Institute of Administration and Management auditorium. Petrobangla which supplies Pashchimanchal Gas Company Limited and five other gas distributors in Bangladesh also wanted to raise the price of bulk gas. The Ministry of Finance had been pressuring state owned companies to raise their revenue. The companies sought to more than double the gas prices. On 1 May 2022, Pashchimanchal Gas Company Limited stopped natural gas supply in Rajshahi Division for two weeks. Last month gas supplies were shut down during Eid in Bogra due to repair work by Gas Transmission Company Limited.
