= Mezbahuddin Ahmed (geologist) =

Mesbahuddin Ahmed was a Bangladeshi educationalist and geologist.

== Early life ==
Ahmed was born on 8 September 1920 in Dibrugarh, Assam, British India. In 1941, he graduated from high school. He received a B.Sc. degree in geology from the Presidency University, Kolkata in 1943. He completed his master's in geology from the Presidency University, Kolkata in 1945. In 1948, he completed a master's in economics from Columbia University.

== Career ==
Ahmed served in the Geological Survey of Pakistan. After the Bangladesh Liberation war and the Independence of Bangladesh, he joined the Geological Survey of Bangladesh. He served as the head of the planning and implementation cell in the Ministry of Power, Energy and Mineral Resources. In 1982, he retired from government service and joined the private sector as a consultant. He was as a consultant in the 2nd gas development project of the World Bank in Bangladesh. He worked at the National Oceanographic And Maritime Institute. He was the founding vice-president of Bangladesh Geological Society. He served two terms as the president of Bangladesh Geological Society.

== Death ==
Ahmed died on 28 September 2002 in Dhaka, Bangladesh.
