= Srikail Gas Field =

Natural gas field in Bangladesh

- Location within Bangladesh
- Country: Bangladesh
- Region: Comilla
- Offshore/onshore: onshore
- Coordinates: 23.7387°N 90.9918°E
- Operator: BAPEX

Field history
- Discovery: 2012

Production
- Current production of gas: 41×10^{6}–44×10^{6} cu ft/d (1.2×10^{6}–1.2×10^{6} m^{3}/d)

Srikail Gas Field (Bengali: শ্রীকাইল গ্যাসক্ষেত্র) is a natural gas field located in Comilla, Bangladesh. It is controlled by Bangladesh Petroleum Exploration and Production Company Limited (BAPEX).

== Location ==
Srikail gas field is located in Srikail village of Shrikail union, Muradnagar Upazila, Comilla district, Chittagong Division. It is 7 km (4.3 mi) away from the Bangura gas field and lies in the same landscape, and these two fielde are spread over an area of 140 km^{2}.

== Production ==
BAPEX announced the discovery of the Srikail gas field in 2004, but the service could not continue due to faulty excavation; later in 2012, the well was excavated again. From May 5, to June 30, 2012, the gas was found at a depth of 3,218 meters.

It is a medium-sized gas field. According to BAPEX, the field holds 300 billion cubic feet (BCF) of gas reserves. Currently, the gas field is producing 41-44 million cubic feet of gas per day from its two wells and providing it to the national grid.

== See also ==
- List of natural gas fields in Bangladesh
- Bangladesh Gas Fields Company Limited
- Gas Transmission Company Limited
