= Bibiyana Gas Field =

Natural gas field in Bangladesh

- Country: Bangladesh
- Region: Habiganj
- Offshore/onshore: onshore
- Operator: Chevron (Bangladesh)

Field history
- Discovery: 1981

Bibiyana Gas Field (Bengali: বিবিয়ানা গ্যাসক্ষেত্র, Sylheti: ꠛꠤꠛꠤꠁꠀꠘꠣ ꠉ꠆ꠁꠀꠡꠇꠡꠦꠔꠞꠣ) is a natural gas field discovered in 1981 in Habiganj, Bangladesh. It is a subsidiary of Chevron (Bangladesh), a leading US multinational company in the oil and gas sector.

== Location ==
24.66607°N 91.59722°E

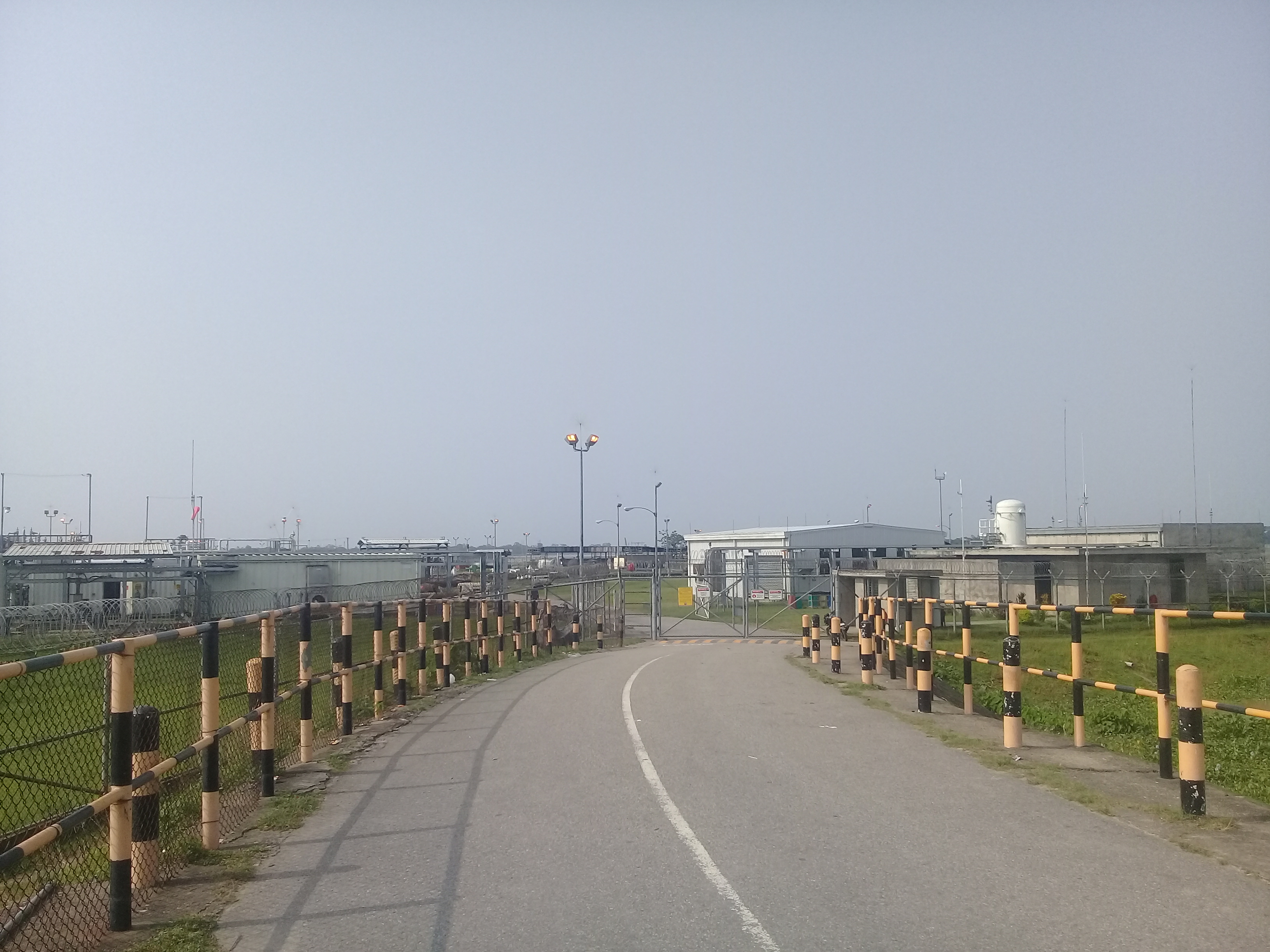
Bibiyana Gas Field,

Bibiyana gas field is located in Kasba, Dighalba Union of Nabiganj Upazila of Habiganj District in Sylhet Division.

== See also ==
- List of natural gas fields in Bangladesh
- Bangladesh Gas Fields Company Limited
- Gas Transmission Company Limited
