= Jalal Ahmed (bureaucrat) =

Chairman of BERC

- জালাল আহমেদ

Chairman Bangladesh Energy Regulatory Commission
- Incumbent
- Assumed office 24 August 2024
- President: Mohammed Shahabuddin
- Prime Minister: Tarique Rahman: Muhammad Yunus (acting)
- Preceded by: Md. Nurul Amin

Personal details
- Born: 3 January 1961 (age 65) Habiganj District, East Pakistan
- Education: University of Dhaka
- Occupation: Civil servant

Jalal Ahmed is a Bangladeshi civil servant who has served the government of Bangladesh for over 36 years as a member of the Bangladesh Civil Service (Administration). Throughout his extensive career, he has held several key positions in the energy and finance sectors.

== Early life ==
Jalal Ahmed graduated with a degree in public administration from the University of Dhaka, where he also completed his post-graduation. He joined the Bangladesh Civil Service (BCS) in 1982 as part of the BCS Administration cadre.

== Career ==
Ahmed served as assistant commissioner, upazila magistrate, and upazila nirbahi officer (UNO) in Banshkhali. He also held the role of metropolitan magistrate in Chittagong and additional deputy commissioner (ADC) of Noakhali. Notably, he was appointed deputy commissioner and district magistrate in Thakurgaon and Faridpur districts. He was joint secretary in the Energy Division with additional responsibilities as project director of the Hydrocarbon Unit and director general of the Geological Survey of Bangladesh. In 2004, prior to the separation of the judiciary from the executive branch, he served as chief metropolitan magistrate (CMM) of Dhaka.

In 2007, Ahmed was appointed as the chairman of Bangladesh Oil, Gas & Minerals Corporation (Petrobangla). He served in this capacity until April 2009. Following a brief period, he was appointed as the vice chairman (CEO) of the Export Promotion Bureau (EPB) in 2010–11.

From 2012 to 2017, Ahmed served as an additional secretary of the Finance Division. In 2018–19, he was the executive project director of the Skills for Employment Investment Program (SEIP).

After retiring from the civil service, Ahmed transitioned to the private sector, assuming the role of senior executive director at Ha-meem Group, one of Bangladesh's leading garment exporters. Additionally, in 2023, he was appointed as an adjunct faculty member in the Department of Public Administration at the University of Dhaka.

In 2024, Ahmed was appointed chairman of the Bangladesh Energy Regulatory Commission (BERC). His appointment came at a time when significant changes were made to BERC's regulatory authority, with the government restoring the commission's full power.
