= Jibon Kanai Das =

Bangladeshi army general

- Born: 12 February 1950 (age 76); Dinajpur District, East Pakistan, Pakistan
- Children: 2
- Military career
- Allegiance: Bangladesh
- Branch: Bangladesh Army
- Service years: 1971 – 2003
- Rank: Major General
- Units: East Bengal Regiment; Army Service Corps
- Commands: Commandant of National Defence College; Commandant, School of Infantry and Tactics; Regional Commander, Northeastern Regional Command, BDR; Director General, Training Directorate, Armed Forces Division; Commander of 7th Battalion, BDR

Jibon Kanai Das is a retired major general of the Bangladesh Army and a veteran of the Bangladesh Liberation War.

== Career ==
In 1971, during the Bangladesh Liberation War, Das was commissioned into the Bangladesh Army under the Bangladesh War Courses.

On 15 August 1975, then-Captain Das, serving as officer commanding of the Bulk Inspection Unit in Dhaka Cantonment, became one of the early military officers to witness the aftermath of the assassination of Sheikh Mujibur Rahman and his family at their residence on Road 32, Dhanmondi. According to his later account, Das and fellow officer Captain Muqtadir Ali learned of the coup through a radio broadcast. Subsequently, they accompanied a senior officer on official duty through the city during the imposition of martial law. While returning via Mirpur Road, they encountered Major Bazlul Huda, one of the coup leaders, who invited them to enter the residence. Das described observing multiple bodies inside the premises, including those of Sheikh Mujibur Rahman, his family members, and staff, all of whom had been killed. He and his colleague covered the bodies with bedsheets found on-site, stating that their actions were guided by military tradition and respect for the deceased. His testimony, later published, has been cited as a firsthand account of the site's condition in the immediate aftermath of the events of 15 August 1975.

Das was promoted to major in 1980 and served as a battalion staff officer in the East Bengal Regiment. He attended the Staff College as a major from 1982 to 1984. From 1984 to 1986, he was an adjutant in BMA Bhatiary. From 1986 to 1987, he again served as a company commander in the East Bengal Regiment. Das was promoted to lieutenant colonel in 1987 and served for a time in the Armed Forces Division, Training Division and then as the commanding officer of the 21st Battalion of the BDR in Khulna from 1989 to 1991. From 1991 to 1993, he served as the commanding officer of the 7th Battalion of the BDR in Khagrachhari and also undertook the Armed Forces War Course in the NDC. From 1993 to 1995, he served as an instructor in the Defence Services Staff College. He was promoted to colonel in 1995 and made the commandant of the 12th Battalion of the BDR in Rangamati. From 1997 to 1998 he served in the Armed Forces Division, when he was promoted to brigadier. As a brigadier, he served as the DG of the Training Division of the Armed Forces Division from 1998 to 1999. In 1999 he was made regional commander in the BDR until 2001. From 2001 to 2003, he served as the commandant of the School of Infantry & Tactics, Sylhet. In 2002 he was promoted to major general and became the commandant of the National Defence College. On 3 May 2002, Harris Chowdhury, political secretary to Prime Minister Khaleda Zia, issued a white paper that accused a number of ministers of the previous Awami League government, civil servants, and army officers of corruption, including Das.

From 29 January 2008 to 27 April 2008, Das was the director general of the Bangladesh Institute of International and Strategic Studies. He was a member of the Gulshan Sarbajanin Puja Udjapan Parishad, and president of the Jashomadhav Temple Management Committee. He served as the president of the Bangladesh War Courses Foundation. He is an adviser of the Bangladesh Senior Citizen Welfare Society and the chief executive officer of the Forum for the Rights of the Elderly Bangladesh. He is the president of the Baridhara DOHS Puja Committee.
