= Bangladesh Geological Society =

Scientific organisation

- Formation: March 1972
- Headquarters: Dhaka, Bangladesh
- Region served: Bangladesh
- Official language: Bengali
- Website: Bangladesh Geological Society

Bangladesh Geological Society is a non-government national geographic society in Bangladesh and is located in Dhaka, Bangladesh. It is a non-profit organisation.

== History ==
Bangladesh Geological Society was established in March 1972 soon after the Independence of Bangladesh in 1971. The society publishes the Bangladesh Journal of Geology twice every year. The society has four types of membership which are associate, honorary, life, and ordinary. The club is administered by a president, three vice presidents, and an eleven-member executive council. Fyaz Hussain Khan was the president of the society from 1976 to 1977. Mezbahuddin Ahmed was the founding vice-president of the Society.
