= Jalalabad Gas Transmission and Distribution System Limited =

State-owned gas distribution company

- Formation: 1 December 1986
- Type: SOE
- Purpose: Gas transmission and distribution
- Headquarters: Sylhet, Bangladesh
- Region served: Sylhet division
- Official language: Bengali
- Parent organization: Petrobangla
- Website: jgtdsl.gov.bd

Jalalabad Gas Transmission and Distribution System Limited (Bengali: জালালাবাদ গ্যাস ট্রান্সমিসন এ্যান্ড ডিস্ট্রিবিউশন সিস্টেম লিমিটেড) is a Bangladeshi state-owned gas transmission and distribution company in Sylhet Division. Jalalabad Gas operates under the Ministry of Power, Energy and Mineral Resources and Petrobangla. Jalalabad Gas was incorporated as a mutual fund company under the Companies Act on 1 December 1986.

== History ==
With the completion of Hobigonj Tea Valley Project, a Program on Sylhet Town Gas Supply Project was initiated by Petrobangla. On the merger of the two projects in 1977, formal gas distribution in Sylhet town started in 1978. With the implementation of Sylhet Tea Estate Gas Supply Project-1, Sunamgonj Town Gas Supply Project, Kailashtilla-Chhatak Pipeline Project and Chhatak Town Gas Supply Project, the Gas Supply network recorded a significant expansion in the region.

To meet the growing demand, Jalalabad Gas Transmission and Distribution System Limited was formed on December 1, 1986, under the Company Act with an authorized capital of Tk.150 crores. The objective was to help improve the socio-economic condition of the people of Sylhet region.

The company has been playing an important role since its inception in reducing dependency on imported fuel, saving of foreign currency and maintenance of ecological balance through construction of pipeline, installation and maintenance of related facilities to ensure uninterrupted transmission and distribution of gas throughout the franchise area.

== Mission and Vission ==
Vission:

Efficient and secure transmission and distribution of natural gas in the Jalalabad Gas Affiliated Area.

Mission:

Providing better services to the respected customers, ensuring efficient use of natural gas and also ensuring good governance in gas marketing.
