= Barapukuria Power Station =

Power station in Bangladesh

Coordinates: 25.5541°N 88.9494°E

Barapukuria Power Station is located near Durgapur, Dinajpur, Bangladesh. It consists of two 125-megawatt units and one 275 MW unit. This coal-fired power station was commissioned in 2006, and is operated by the Bangladesh Power Development Board (BPDB).

There are three units of the plant, operated by BPDB, which can generate a combined 525 megawatts of electricity. Two units are capable of generating 250 MW power together and third unit can generate 275 MW power which is synchronised with national from late December 2017.

The power plan was shut down after the discovery of Barapukuria coal scam on 22 July 2018, due to acute shortage of coal. Before the shut down of the plant it had been supplying around 380 MW power to the national grid on an average.

When the power plant shutdown in first time, the people of eight northern districts of Rangpur and Dinajpur regions suffered most lacking of electricity. After the consideration of their suffering, BPDB decided to restart one of its units for five days from August 20 to lessen public suffering. On 28 August in 2018; the plant shut down again.

On 14 September 2018, the coal plant started to produce electricity again.

== See also ==
- Electricity sector in Bangladesh
- List of power stations in Bangladesh
