= Abul Basar Sikder =

Bangladeshi politician

- আবুল বাসার সিকদার

Member of the Bangladesh Parliament for Jessore-13
- In office 18 February 1979 – 12 February 1982
- Preceded by: Khandaker Abdul Hafeez
- Succeeded by: Seats abolished

Personal details
- Born: 26 March 1926 (age 100) Mulasree, Kalia thana, British India
- Party: Bangladesh Nationalist Party

Abul Basar Sikder is a Bangladeshi politician. He is a member of the Bangladesh Nationalist Party. He was elected a member of parliament from Jessore-13 in 1979 Bangladeshi general election.

== Biography ==
Abul Basar Sikder was born on 26 March 1926 in Mulasree village of what is now Kalia Upazila, Narail District, Bangladesh.

Abul Basar Sikder was elected a Member of Parliament from Jessore-13 constituency as a Bangladesh Nationalist Party candidate in the 1979 Bangladeshi general election.
