= Karnaphuli Gas Distribution Company Limited =

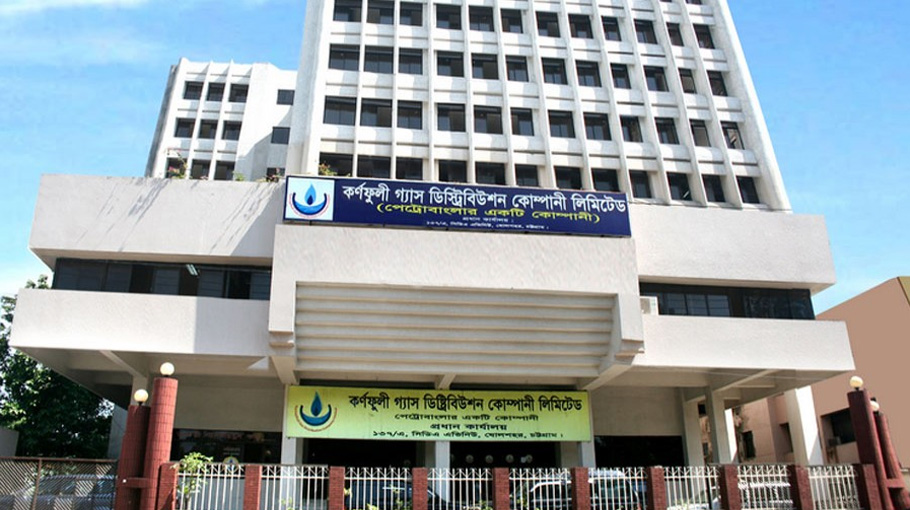
- KGDCL Head Office Image
- Abbreviation: KGDCL
- Formation: 2010
- Type: SOE
- Legal status: Company
- Purpose: Gas distribution
- Headquarters: Chattogram, Bangladesh
- Location: 137/A, CDA Avenue, Sholashahar, Chittagong, Bangladesh
- Region served: Chattogram division
- Official language: Bengali
- Main organ: Board
- Parent organization: Petrobangla
- Website: kgdcl.gov.bd]

Karnaphuli Gas Distribution Company Limited (Bengali: কর্ণফুলী গ্যাস ডিস্ট্রিবিউশন কোম্পানী লিমিটেড) is a Bangladesh government-owned major gas distribution company that is responsible for distributing gas in Chittagong District and the Chittagong Hill Tracts. It has authorized capital of one thousand crore taka. As of 2022, it employed 410 staff and served 0.59 million domestic, 2884 commercial, and 1447 industrial customers.

== History ==
Karnaphuli Gas Distribution Company Limited was established on 8 February 2010 by the government of Bangladesh as a joint stock company. Its starting authorized capital was 30 million taka, which is now 10,000 million taka. It started its revenue collection from July 2010. In 2018, the company bought the first liquefied natural gas shipment in Bangladesh from Qatar for adding it to its distribution network for Chittagong City.
