= Abul Hasnat (writer and editor) =

Abul Hasnat (1945 – November 1, 2020) was a Bangladeshi journalist, writer and literary editor. He was the former vice president of the cultural organization Chhayanaut and director of Bengal Publications. He is best known for his editorship of Kali o Kolom magazine, a pioneering literary monthly in Bangladesh.

Before Kali o Kalam, he was literary editor at Dainik Sangbad newspaper for more than two decades. Besides Kali o Kalam, he also edited the visual arts magazine Shilpo o Shilpi.

His published works include poetry collections such as জ্যোৎস্না ও দুর্বিপাক, কোনো একদিন ভুবনডাঙায়, ভুবনডাঙার মেঘ and নধর কালো বেড়াল. He also published essays on Bengali cultural figures such as the writer Manik Bandopadhyay and the artists Jainul Abedin and Quamrul Hassan. As a writer of children's books, he published ইস্টিমার সিটি দিয়ে যায়, টুকু ও সমুদ্রের গল্প (Tuku and the Sea), যুদ্ধদিনের ধূসর দুপুরে, রানুর দুঃখ-ভালোবাসা etc. Tuku and the Sea won the Agrani Bank Children's Literature Award in 1982.

He often wrote under the pseudonym Mahmud al Zaman.
