= GCM Resources =

British coal mining company

GCM Resources plc
- Type: Public company
- Industry: Coal mining
- Founded: 1998?
- Headquarters: London, United Kingdom
- Key people: Leslie chow Chief Executive (London)
- Website: www.gcmplc.com

GCM Resources plc (AIM: GCM), formerly Asia Energy and Global Coal Management, is a mining company quoted in the London Alternative Investment Market. Its major asset and goal is to exploit open cast coal mining opportunities in the Phulbari region of Dinajpur District, Bangladesh.

== Company overview ==
GCM Resources plc (formerly Asia Energy plc) was incorporated in London in September 2003 and acquired 100% of Asia Energy Corporation Pty Ltd, which held the licences to explore and mine the Phulbari Coal Project in the Dinajpur district of Bangladesh.

Asia Energy Corporation Pty Ltd entered the coal mining scenario in 1998 by buying the mining contract originally awarded to the international coal giant, BHP, on 20 August 1994. BHP Billiton Mitsubishi Alliance (BMA) is Australia's largest coal producer and a leader in the international coal industry. BHP claims it sold its rights for strip mining at Phulbari because the coal is deeper than 130 meters (it is at 151 meters depth).

Asia Energy must pay Deepgreen Minerals Corporation $1 per tonne of ore sold. Deepgreen ceased to be listed when it merged with Cambrian Mining in 2004.

Opponents in Bangladesh and an alliance of groups in London have protested the plans for open-pit mining in the Phulbari region, because of adverse environmental and social effects. They estimate 120,000 people may be displaced, including the local Shantal indigenous group. Protesters have said such a mine would endanger an important food-producing region, as well as the quality of the water supply depended on by tens of thousands of people. There were major protests in Bangladesh in 2006, with an estimated total of 70,000 people involved over weeks.

== 2006 Phulbari incident ==
On 30 August 2006 six protesters were shot dead, allegedly by paramilitary forces, and 300 were injured when a crowd of 30,000 people stormed the local offices of Asia Energy. Further unrest occurred the days after the shootings, when widespread half-day strikes were organised across the country, and another 20 people were injured. The Bangladesh government banned further protests at the mine site.

Gary Lye, chief executive of Asia Energy Corporation (Bangladesh) Pty Ltd, was quoted as saying, "It is up to the authorities to determine exactly what happened, but it would appear that the unforgivable events and the needless loss of life and suffering that took place yesterday in Phulbari are entirely the fault of the organisers (of the protest)". Asia Energy had its right to mine in Bangladesh withdrawn. Asia Energy said that fewer people would be displaced and they would be compensated. Spokesmen noted the benefits of the $1.1bn (£700m) project. The government closed the mine at the time because of the violent protests.

A 2009 leaked US diplomatic cable showed that American diplomats pressured the Bangladeshi government to reopen the Phulbari Coal Project with GCM. As of late 2010, there was still potential to proceed with the project.

== Suspension of trading ==
On news of the withdrawal of mining rights, shares in Asia Energy crashed, falling from 284p to 117.5p in a single day. The company requested trading be suspended, on 31 August 2006, saying "Asia Energy plc ("the Company") became aware this morning of press reports quoting a junior minister in Bangladesh stating that the Bangladesh Government is cancelling all existing agreements with Asia Energy. The Company had not received any communication from the Government to this effect. In view of this, the shares of Asia Energy were suspended from trading on the AIM Market at 08:40 hrs (BST) this morning." The company resumed trading on the London AIM on 6 October 2006, saying "The Company has received no notification from the Government of Bangladesh of any changes to the terms of the Company's contract and the Directors do not believe that there are any grounds for the contract to be terminated." After its first full day back, the shares stood at 95p, compared to 665p on 11 October 2005.

== Name change ==
On 11 January 2007 Asia Energy changed its name to Global Coal Management plc while maintaining that it was "fully committed to the Phulbari Coal Project in Bangladesh". The AIM-listed company has subsequently changed its name to GCM Resources plc, and has invested in coal and uranium projects in other countries.

== Environmental impact ==
The open-pit mining method proposed for Phulbari requires the mine area to be completely dewatered so that the hollow of the mine does not get immersed in water. Large pumps are required to suck out underground water around the mine constantly. GCM's solution is to distribute the water pumped out among the farmers, but in Bangladesh, the problem of arsenic contamination is severe. According to GCM, topsoil will be removed and preserved once the mining operation begins in a particular block. Topsoil will be brought back and spread on the top of the area filled in. There are questions regarding when the land would become cultivable again.

== Discussions ==
GCM and the United States have tried to encourage the government of Bangladesh to take up the Phulbari Coal Project again. At the same time, activists have continued to organise against the mine. In October 2010, protesters conducted a week-long march from Phulbari to Dhaka in Bangladesh against the project. In December 2010, an alliance of groups protested in London outside at a meeting of GCR company officials and stockholders.

It is believed in 2024, GCM RESOURCES is currently being discussed at the highest possible levels within Bangladeshi government. And may be a significant discussion with Hasina's visit to China this month. With Power China's involvement with the whole project.
