= Bakhrabad Gas Field =

Natural gas field in Bangladesh

- Location within Bangladesh
- Country: Bangladesh
- Region: Comilla
- Offshore/onshore: onshore
- Coordinates: 23°38′8″N 90°52′14″E
- Operator: BGFCL

Field history
- Discovery: 1968
- Start of production: 1981

Production
- Current production of gas: 15×10^{6} cu ft/d (420×10^{3} m^{3}/d)

Bakhrabad Gas Field (Bengali: বাখরাবাদ গ্যাসক্ষেত্র) is a natural gas field located in Comilla, Bangladesh. It was discovered in 1968 by the then Pakistan Shell Oil Company, and started gas production in 1981. Wells were drilled at depths between 1968 and 2838 meters from the surface. Gas production was 930 thousand cubic metres (33 million cubic feet) per day at that time. As of 2019, the production in Bakharabad Gas Field has declined, producing only 420 thousand m^{3} (15 million ft^{3}) of gas per day. It is a subsidiary of Bangladesh Gas Fields Company Limited (BGFCL).

== See also ==
- List of natural gas fields in Bangladesh
- Bangladesh Gas Fields Company Limited
- Gas Transmission Company Limited
