= Khalashpir =

Coordinates: 25.4079°N 89.2068°E

Khalashpir is a populated area in Pirganj Upazila, Rangpur District, Bangladesh. The area is notable for Khalashirpir Hat, a bazaar. It also has one of the five known coal reserves of Bangladesh.
