= Bangladesh Energy Regulatory Commission =

Energy Regulatory Bodies of Bangladesh

- বাংলাদেশ এনার্জি রেগুলেটরী কমিশন
- Logo of Bangladesh Energy Regulatory Commission
- Abbreviation: BERC
- Formation: 2003
- Type: Independent statutory state Quasi-judicial body
- Headquarters: Dhaka, Bangladesh
- Region served: Bangladesh
- Chairman: Jalal Ahmed
- Website: www.berc.org.bd

The Bangladesh Energy Regulatory Commission (BERC) is an autonomous independent statutory state Quasi-judicial body established in 2003 to regulate the energy sector in Bangladesh, including electricity, gas, and petroleum. BERC is tasked with setting tariffs, issuing licenses, and resolving disputes within the industry to ensure transparency, protect consumer rights, and maintain fair pricing. It is located in Dhaka, Bangladesh.

== History ==
The commission was created in 2003 and is responsible for the setting of gas, petroleum oil and electricity prices in Bangladesh. As the regulator, it also arbitrates disputes in the energy industry. Its approval is needed for any changes in the price of electricity, gas and petroleum oil. The Energy Security Fund is under this agency.

However, over the years government interventions have significantly reduced BERC's authority, especially regarding energy pricing. Amendments to the BERC Act allowed the government to bypass the commission's procedures and directly set energy prices. This shift had raised concerns about the transparency and independence of the regulatory process, as BERC's ability to conduct public hearings and ensure fair practices had been curtailed.

In August 2024, the government issued a gazette officially revoking its executive authority to raise power and gas prices without a public hearing by BERC. The reversal of this authority is seen as a move to strengthen regulatory oversight and restore the commission's role in protecting consumer interests by involving the public in the decision-making process.

== Commission ==
Sl	Designation	Name
1.	Chairman	Jalal Ahmed
2.	Member- Admin	Md Abdur Razzak
3.	Member- Gas	Md Mizanur Rahman
4.	Member- Petroleum	Syeda Sultana Razia
5.	Member- Electricity	Brig. General Md Shahid Sarwar (Retd.)

== Controversy ==
On 26 November 2024, Md Gias Uddin Joarder was appointed member- electricity by an office order from an adviser of Interim government Muhammad Fouzul Kabir Khan. There were allegations of corruption against him in Anti Corruption Commission. Anti Corruption Commission is doing enquiry of the corruption case of Md Gias Uddin Joarder, later he has resigned against the backdrop of Al Jazeera Investigates reports on his alleged involvement in corruption.
