= Nazmul Ahsan =

Bangladeshi politician

Nazmul Ahsan is a Bangladesh civil servant and former secretary to the Ministry of Water Resources of the Bangladesh government.

== Early life ==
Nazmul Ahsan completed his undergraduate and master's in physics from the University of Dhaka.

== Career ==
Nazmul Ahsan joined the Bangladesh Civil Service on 25 April 1994 as an administration cadre in the 13th batch.

He served as the deputy commissioner of Khulna District and Satkhira District.

In 2013, Nazmul Ahsan served as a deputy secretary in the Ministry of Power, Energy and Mineral Resources.

On 6 December 2021, Nazmul Ahsan was appointed chairman of Petrobangla replacing ABM Abdul Fattah. He previously served as a director of administration of Petrobangla. He was an additional secretary at the Energy and Mineral Resources Division. He was part of a government meeting established to ensure uninterrupted electric supply during the 2022 Ramadan. In April 2022, he inaugurated a Mujib corner, named after former President Mujibur Rahman, at the Petrobangla headquarters in Karwan Bazar. On 11 December 2022, Nazmul Ahsan was appointed the secretary to the Ministry of Water Resources. He served as the secretary upto 17 August 2025 before going into his retirement.
