= Nonviolent movement opposing open pit mining in Bangladesh =

The indigenous people of Phulbari, Bangladesh, fought against the use of open-pit mining from August 26, 2006, to February 6, 2014. Open pit mining would displace thousands of people, as well as destroy farmland, and divert water sources for use in the mining process.

== Overview ==
BHP, an Australian mining company, discovered coal in Phulbari between 1994 and 1997. Upon discovering that the depth of the coal deposits would result in destructive mining activity, BHP sold its right to mine to London based Asia Energy Corporation. Asia Energy Corporation proposed an open pit mine project, and estimated that it would take thirty-six years to mine the deposit. The Bangladesh Department of Environment approved the open pit mine project by granting it "Environmental Clearance for Mining" on September 11, 2005.

== Nonviolent methods ==
On August 26, 2006, 50,000 people marched to demonstrate opposition to the proposed mining project. A paramilitary organization named the Bangladesh Rifles opened fire on protestors, and killed five people. Protestors held demonstrative funerals for the five activists who were shot and killed during the protest. Furthermore, the protestors responded to the paramilitary violence on August 28, 2006, by organizing a national strike that managed to close offices, educational institutions and roads in the Dinajpur district.

On October 20, 2011, eighty international organizations wrote letters to the remaining investors of the open pit mining project. They asked that investors withdraw their investments by explaining the human rights violations and environmental risks linked to the project. A movement leader and activist, Samina Luthfa, taunted the director of the mining project by giving him an "eviction notice", suggesting that the company should leave Bangladesh immediately.

== Movement leaders and allies ==
Leaders of the movement include Professor Anu Muhammad, "Mr. Nuruzuman" (who was publicly tortured by the Bangladesh military in February 2007), SMA Khaleque, Aminul Bablu, Joy Prakash Gupta, Shikder Sarker, Syed Saiful Islam Jewel, Murtoza Sharker Manik and Samina Luthfa.

Jatiya Gana Front was a prominent allied organization for the movement. Its members held a rally and march in Bangladesh. The organization published a statement addressed to the government stating that any progress for the open pit mining project would be interfered with.

London Mining Network was an allied organization that targeted the funders of the mining project. Their goal was to convince the funders of the mining project to revoke their funding.

Independent human rights experts within the United Nations allied with the movement. On February 28, 2012, they advised against the Bangladesh government commencing the open pit mining because of the human rights violations involved with the project. Later that year, on November 9, the National Committee put pressure on the government to expel the mining companies from Bangladesh.

== Success ==
On February 6, 2014, a meeting was held in Bangladesh with the Power and Energy Ministry's officials. In the meeting, the Prime Minister of Bangladesh, Sheikh Hasina, states that it is in the country's best interest to stop coal extraction for the time being. She claimed that the extraction should be halted until technology for mining has improved. Hasina recognized that food security and protecting the farmers' land is in Bangladesh's best interest. Open pit mining in Phulbari has stopped for now. Further mining development is being prevented by the campaigners' threat of action against the project.
