= Titas Gas =

Largest gas distribution company in Bangladesh

Titas Gas Transmission and Distribution PLC
- logo of Titas Gas

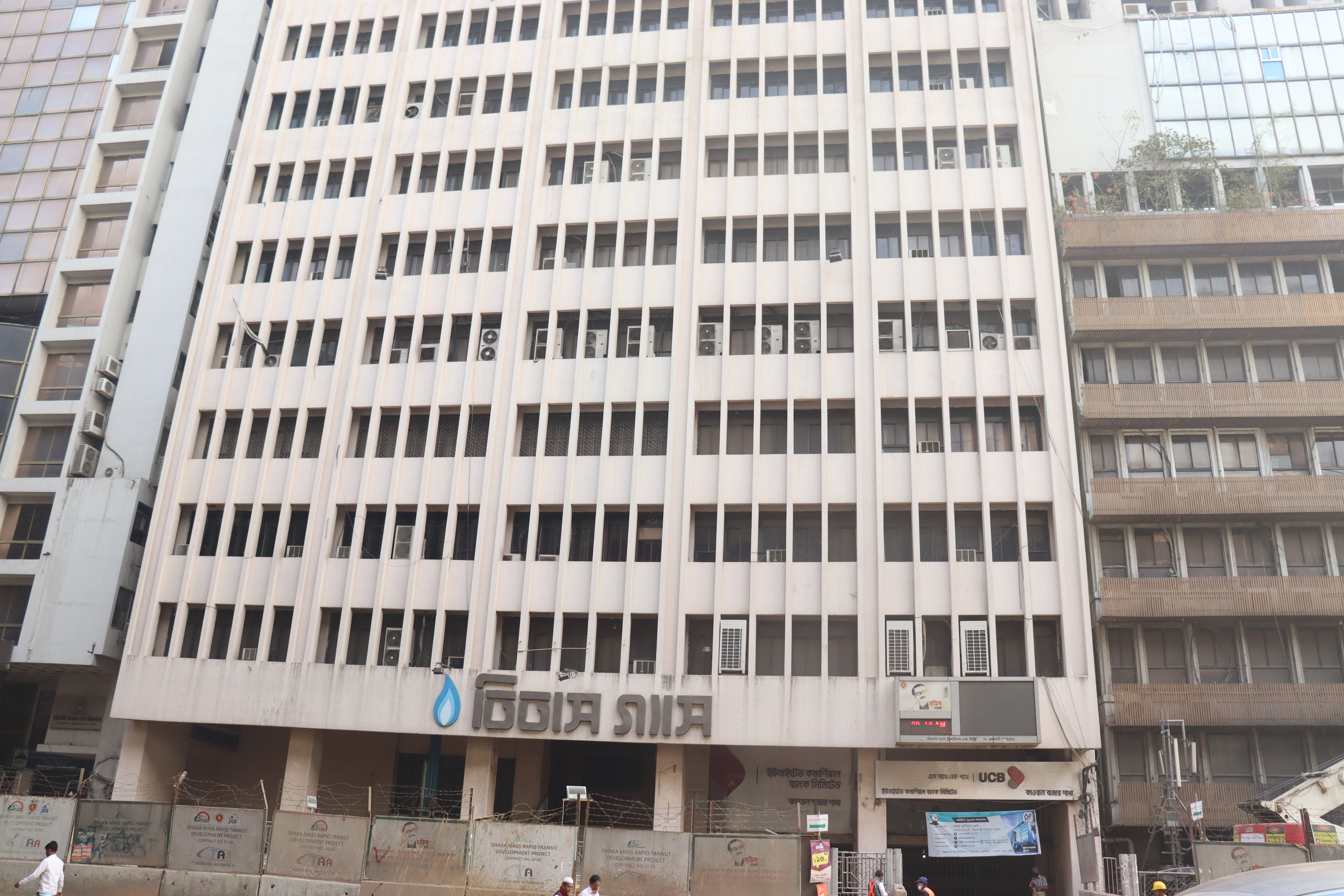
- Abbreviation: TGTD PLC
- Formation: 1964
- Type: SOE
- Legal status: Active
- Purpose: Gas transmission and distribution
- Headquarters: Dhaka, Bangladesh
- Region served: Dhaka and Mymensingh divisions
- Official language: Bengali
- Managing Director: Shahnewaz Parvez
- Parent organization: Petrobangla
- Website: Titas Gas

The Titas Gas Transmission and Distribution PLC (Bengali: তিতাস গ্যাস Titas Gas) is the state-owned natural gas distributor in Bangladesh, with an 80% market share. As of 2020, it employed 2,100 staff and served 2.8 million domestic customers, 12,000 commercial customers, and 5,300 industrial customers. It is responsible for gas distribution in Dhaka and Mymensingh.

== History ==
Titas Gas Transmission and Distribution PLC was established on 20 November 1964 following the discovery of gas in Titas in 1962 in the then East Pakistan. On 28 April 1968, commercial activities started with the supply of gas to Siddhirganj Thermal Power Station through the Titas-Demra gas pipeline. The pipeline was constructed by East Pakistan Industrial Development Corporation. On 9 June 2008, the company was listed on the Dhaka Stock Exchange and on 19 June 2008 it was listed on the Chittagong Stock Exchange.

== Location of the field ==
The Gas field is located some 100 km away to the direction of northern-east from capital city of Bangladesh, Dhaka. It lies at the outskirts of Brahmanbaria town. This field was discovered by Pakistan Shell Oil Company in 1962. The structure is an elongate north–south asymmetrical anticline measuring about 19x10 square km with a vertical closure of 500 m. As per latest official re-estimation, total recoverable gas reserve of Titas gas field is 4,740 billion cubic feet (134 km3). Commercial gas production from this field was commenced in 1968 and till 31 August 2006 total 2,581.162 billion cubic feet (7.30904×1010 m3) gas has been produced. The wells are spread (surface location) at 6 (six) different locations stretched over about 8 km distance. At present maximum 475 million cubic feet (13,500,000 m3) of gas is produced daily from 16 wells of this field and processing through 5 nos. glycol dehydration and 6 nos. Low Temperature Separation (LTS) type process plants and supplied to the transmission pipelines of Titas Gas Transmission & Distribution PLC (TGTD PLC) and Gas Transmission Company Ltd. (GTCL). Condensate produced (540 bbl per day on an average) with gas as by-product is fractionated into MS (Petrol) and HSD(Diesel) through two fractionation plants.
