= Bangladesh Petroleum Exploration and Production Company Limited =

Government-owned oil company

- বাংলাদেশ পেট্রোলিয়াম এক্সপ্লোরেশন এন্ড প্রোডাকশন কোম্পানী লিমিটেড
- Abbreviation: BAPEX
- Formation: 1989
- Headquarters: Dhaka, Bangladesh
- Region served: Bangladesh
- Official language: Bengali
- Parent organization: Petrobangla
- Website: www.bapex.com.bd

Bangladesh Petroleum Exploration and Production Company Limited (BAPEX) is a Bangladesh government owned company responsible for petroleum exploration and production.

== History ==
Bangladesh Petroleum Exploration and Production Company Limited was formed in 1989 by the government of Bangladesh out of the Exploration Directorate of Petrobangla. In October 2017, Bangladesh Petroleum Exploration and Production Company Limited discovered gas in Bhola, Shahbazpur Gas Field. In March 2020, it discovered Srikail Gas Field in Comilla District.
