= Sylhet Gas Fields Limited =

Government owned gas company

- Formation: 8 May 1980
- Headquarters: Haripur, Jaintapur Upazilla Sylhet, Bangladesh
- Region served: Bangladesh
- Official language: Bengali
- Parent organization: Petrobangla

Sylhet Gas Fields Limited (Bengali: সিলেট গ্যাস ফিল্ডস লিমিটেড) is a government owned major gas company in Bangladesh. It is under Petrobangla and is headquartered in Haripur, Jaintapur, Sylhet District.

== History ==
Sylhet Gas Fields Limited traces its origins to gas fields in Haripur, Jaintapur, in Sylhet District discovered by Pakistan Petroleum in 1955. In 1960, the Sylhet gas fields starting producing gas to supply the Chhatak Cement Factory. On 8 May 1982, the Sylhet Gas Fields Limited was incorporated by the government of Bangladesh. On 23 December 1986, the company discovered the first oil field in Bangladesh at Well No. 7 in Haripur. The company is responsible for 5 gas fields in Sylhet division. On 1 August 2009, the company launched a condensate fractionation plant.

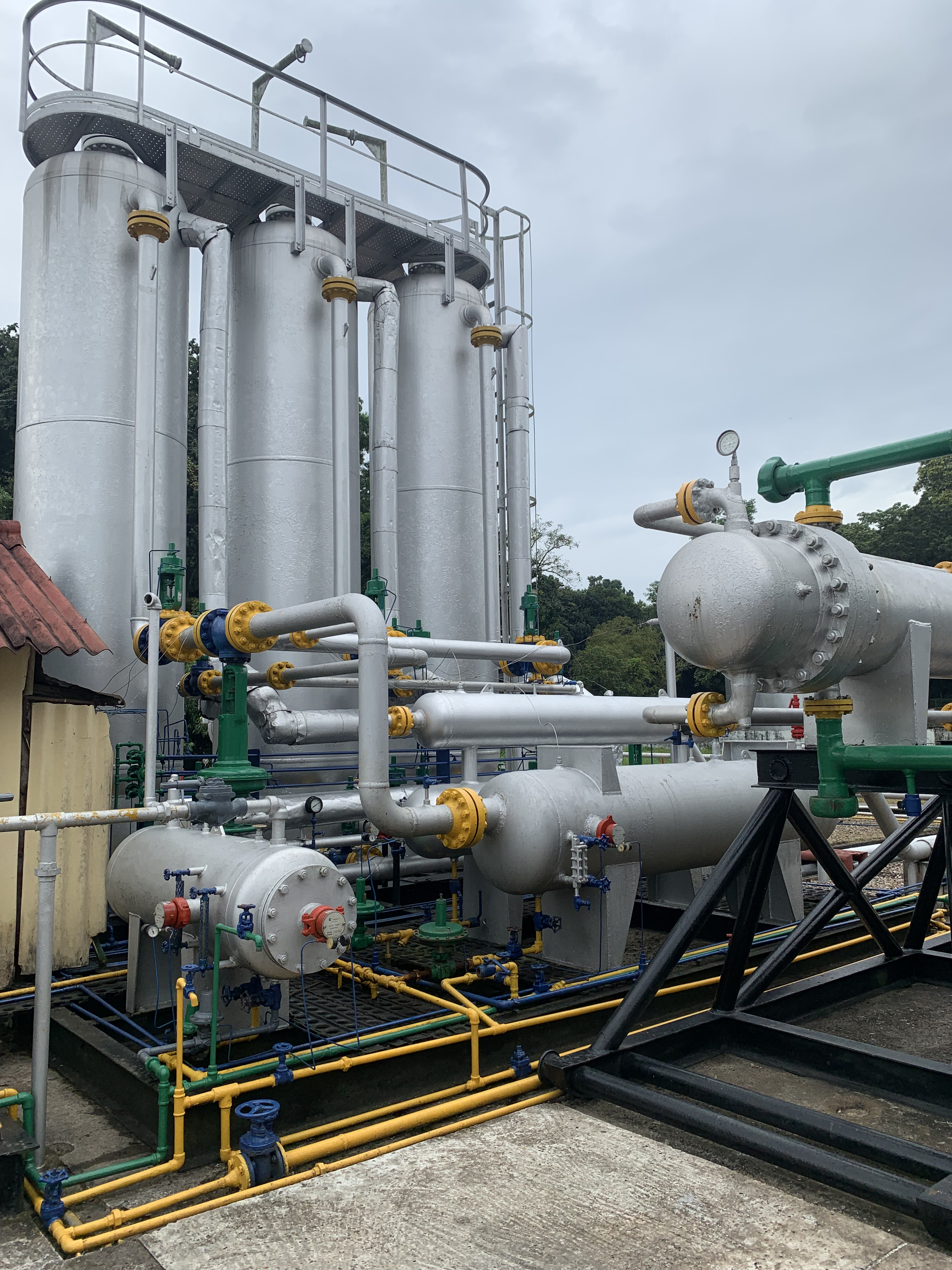
Gas tanks at Sylhet Gas Fields Limited

The company signed an agreement with PT Istana Karang Laut of Indonesia and Energypac Power Generation Ltd to further develop its condensate plant in August 2017. Sylhet Gas Fields Limited is going to establish catalytic reforming unit in Rashidpur area very soon. After completion of this project, the company will fulfil the total demand of Octane completely in Bangladesh.
