= Geological Survey of Bangladesh =

- Formation: 1971
- Type: Governmental
- Headquarters: Segunbagicha, Dhaka, Bangladesh
- Region served: Bangladesh
- Official language: Bengali
- Director General: Md. Abdul Mannan
- Parent organization: Ministry of Power, Energy and Mineral Resources
- Website: www.gsb.gov.bd

Geological Survey of Bangladesh (GSB, Bengali: বাংলাদেশ ভূতাত্ত্বিক জরিপ অধিদপ্তর) is an national organization working in Geological activities in Bangladesh and is located in Segunbagicha, Dhaka, Bangladesh. The incumbent Director General of Geological Survey of Bangladesh is Md. Abdul Mannan.

== History ==
The Geological Survey of Bangladesh was founded in 1971 immediately after the Independence of Bangladesh. The organization was formed out of the remnants of Geological Survey of Pakistan in East Pakistan. The Geological Survey of Pakistan traces its origins to the Geological Survey of India which was founded in 1836. The agency is run by the Energy and Mineral Resources Division of Ministry of Power, Energy and Mineral Resources. It has discovered a number of mines in Bangladesh.

== Branches and Divisions ==
=== Administrative Branches ===
- Operation and Co-ordination Branch
- Publication and Training Branch
- Planning and Implementation Branch

=== Geological Exploration and Application Division ===
- Economic Geology and Resource Assesment Branch
- Environmental Geology and Natural Hazard Assessment Branch
- Urban and Engineering Geology Branch
- Gravity and Magnetic Survey Branch
- Seismic and Geo-electrical Survey Branch
- Geophysical Data Analysis, Logging and Equipment Maintenance Branch
- Drilling Branch

=== Geological Mapping and Geo-laboratories Division ===
- Geological Mapping and Quaternary Geology Branch
- Coastal and Marine Geology Branch
- Remote Sensing and GIS Branch
- Petrology and Mineralogy Branch
- Stratigraphy and Biostratigraphy Branch
- Geochemistry and Water Resources Branch
- Analytical Chemistry Branch
