= Bangladesh Gas Fields Company Limited =

Bangladeshi gas field company

- Abbreviation: BGFCL
- Formation: 1976
- Headquarters: Brahmanbaria, Bangladesh
- Region served: Bangladesh
- Official language: Bengali
- Owner: Government of Bangladesh
- Key people: Abul Mansur Md Faizullah
- Parent organization: Petrobangla
- Subsidiaries: Titas Gas Field, Habiganj Gas Field, Bakhrabad Gas Field, Narsingdi Gas Field, Meghna Gas Field, Kamta Gas Field, Sangu Gas Fields
- Revenue: US$450 million (2016)
- Staff: 1390 (2016)
- Website: Bangladesh Gas Fields Company Limited

Bangladesh Gas Fields Company Limited (Bengali: বাংলাদেশ গ্যাস ফিল্ডস কোম্পানী লিমিটেড), abbreviated as BGFCL, is a major gas fields company that the Bangladesh government owns through Petrobangla. The BGFCL owns Titas Gas Field, Habiganj Gas Field, Bakhrabad Gas Field, Narsingdi Gas Field, Meghna Gas Field, Kamta Gas Field, and Sangu Gas Field.

== History ==
The BGFCL traces its origins to the operations of Shell Oil Company in Bangladesh. On 7 August 1975, the Government of Bangladesh bought the gas fields owned by Shell Oil Company. On 12 September 1975, the BGFCL was established to take over the operations of the gas fields. It currently produces 725 million standard cubic feet of gas daily in Bangladesh. The wells of BGFCL and Sylhet Gas Field Limited, the other state-owned gas field company, are outdated and narrow which has hampered production.
