= Gas Transmission Company Limited =

Gas Transmission Company Limited (GTCL)
- Company type: Government-owned corporation
- Industry: Natural gas transport
- Founded: December 14, 1993 in Dhaka, Bangladesh
- Headquarters: Dhaka, Bangladesh
- Area served: Bangladesh
- Services: Natural Gas Transmission
- Owner: Government of Bangladesh
- Parent: Petrobangla
- Website: www.gtcl.org.bd

Gas Transmission Company Limited is a government-owned company responsible for transmission of natural gas all over Bangladesh. The company operates under the direct supervision of Bangladesh Oil, Gas & Mineral Corporation (Petrobangla).

== History ==
Gas Transmission Company Limited was established on 14 December 1993 under the Companies Act of 1993, as a public limited company with an authorized capital of Tk.100 billion of 100,00,000.00 shares of Tk.1000 each. The company was formed with the objective of establishing a balanced and reliable national gas transmission network with effective and unified control to ensure transportation of required gas for meeting the increasing gas demand in the country. Its formation was recommended by Coopers and Lybrand Associates (today known as PricewaterhouseCoopers) who was hired by the Department for International Development. GTCL commenced its formal operation through convening the first meeting of the board of Directors on 23 January 1994 and subsequently started its commercial business from March 1994.
