= Petrobangla =

National Gas corporation of Bangladesh

Bangladesh Oil, Gas & Mineral Corporation (Petrobangla)
- Seal of Petrobangla

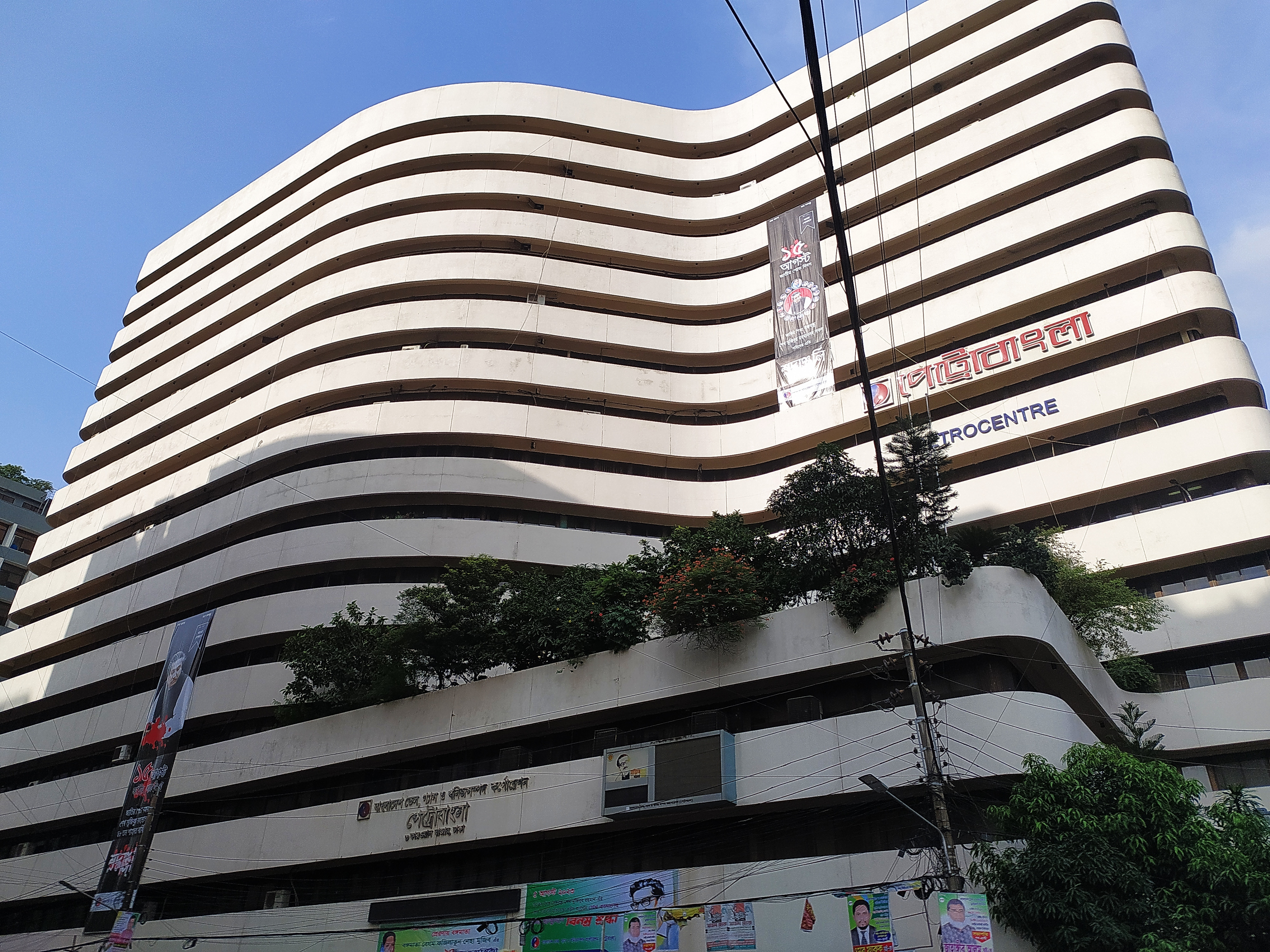
- Petrobangla Building
- Type: Public
- Industry: Oil, Gas and mineral exploration and distribution Industry
- Predecessor: Bangladesh Oil, Gas and Mineral Corporation
- Founded: 26 March 1972
- Headquarters: Kawran Bazar, Dhaka, Bangladesh
- Area served: Bangladesh
- Key people: Md. Abdul Mannan (Chairman)
- Products: Oil and gas Minerals
- Revenue: ▲$ 112.1 billion (2016)
- Operating income: ($ 900 million (2016))
- Total assets: ▲$ 118.6 billion (2016)
- Subsidiaries: BAPEX
- Website: www.petrobangla.org.bd

Bangladesh Oil, Gas & Mineral Corporation (Petrobangla; Bengali: পেট্রোবাংলা) is a government-owned oil, gas and mineral exploration and distribution corporation of Bangladesh. It has the mandate to explore, produce, transport, manage and sell oil, natural gas and other mineral resources. It also concludes production-sharing agreements with international oil companies for the exploration and development of oil, gas and mineral resources in Bangladesh.

== History ==
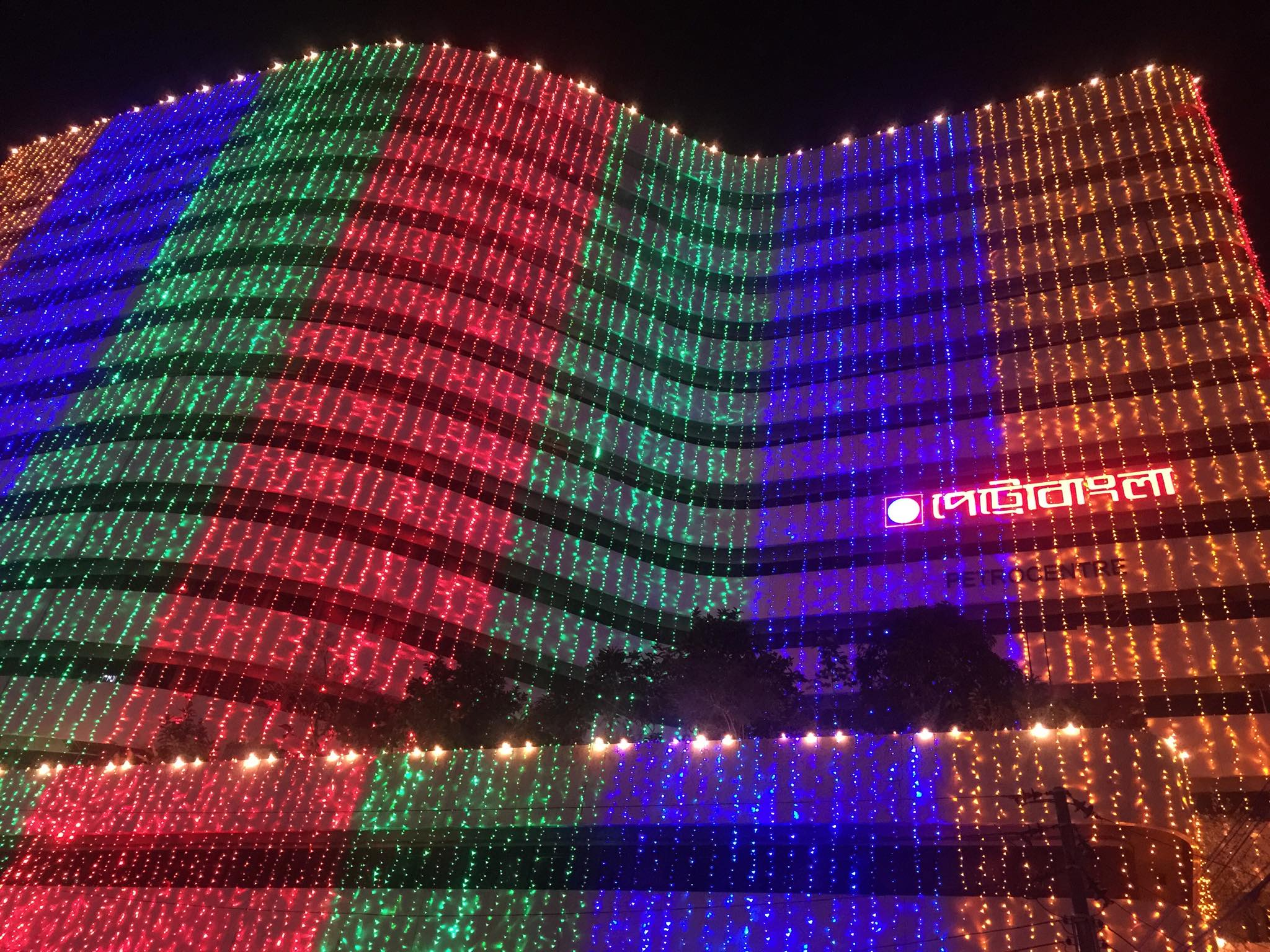
Victory Day celebration by PetroBangla

Petrobangla was established in 1974 (under Ordinance-21, dated 11 April 1985) through the merger of two government organizations — the Bangladesh Oil & Gas Corporation (BOGC) and the Bangladesh Mineral Exploration and Development Corporation (BMEDC) — forming the Bangladesh Oil, Gas and Mineral Corporation (BOGMC). To import liquefied natural gas, Petrobangla signed an agreement with Gunvor Singapore in 2018. In September 2019, QatarEnergy LNG delivered the first cargo of liquefied natural gas from a Q-Flex vessel to Petrobangla's Floating Storage and Regasification Unit off Bangladesh. In January 2020, Petrobangla and Russia's Gazprom signed a Memorandum of Understanding for strategic cooperation.

The group's current chairman is Md Abdul Mannan. A previous chairman was Nazmul Ahsan, appointed in December 2021, replacing Abdul Fattah who was appointed in January 2020.

== Gas distribution companies ==
- Bakhrabad Gas Distribution Company Limited
- Jalalabad Gas Transmission and Distribution System Limited
- Karnaphuli Gas Distribution Company Limited
- Pashchimanchal Gas Company Limited
- Sundarban Gas Company Limited
- Titas Gas Transmission and Distribution Company Limited

== Coal Production company ==
- Barapukuria Coal Mining Company Limited

== Gas Transmission Companies ==
- Gas Transmission Company Limited
