= Port of Chittagong =

Major port in Bangladesh

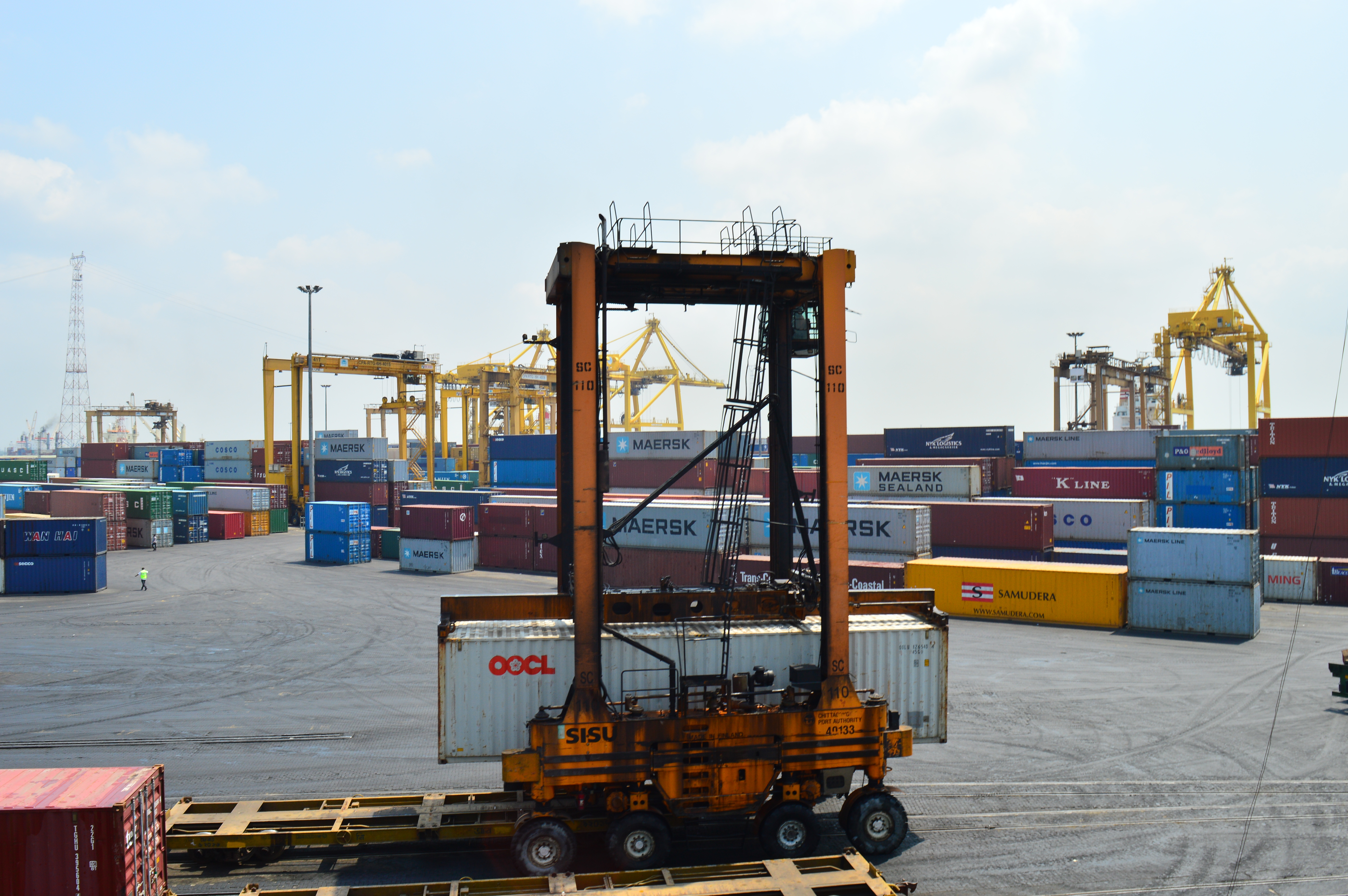
- Container handling in the Port of Chittagong
- Interactive map of Port of Chittagong
- Location within Bangladesh

Location
- Country: Bangladesh
- Location: Chattogram, Chattogram Division
- Coordinates: 22.313°N 91.800°E
- UN/LOCODE: BDCXB

Details
- Opened: Before 2nd century CE (historical); 1887 (modern)
- Operated by: Chittagong Port Authority
- Owned by: Government of Bangladesh
- Type of Harbor: Artificial / Natural
- No. of berths: 19
- Employees: 7246
- Chairman: Rear Admiral S M Moniruzzaman

Statistics
- Annual cargo tonnage: 100M (2019–20)
- Annual container volume: 3.097M TEUs (2020–21)
- Website cpa.gov.bd

The Port of Chittagong (Bengali: চট্টগ্রাম বন্দর) is the main seaport of Bangladesh. Located in Bangladesh's port city of Chattogram, and on the banks of the Karnaphuli River. The port handles over 70 percent of Bangladesh's export-import trade, and has been used by India, Nepal and Bhutan for transshipment. According to Lloyd's, it ranked as the 58th busiest container port in the world in 2019. The port has a recorded history dating back to ancient Roman accounts. It is the busiest container port on the Bay of Bengal.

Congestion is a major challenge in Chittagong port. The port had a congestion rate of 84.3 hours between January and July in 2017.

== History ==
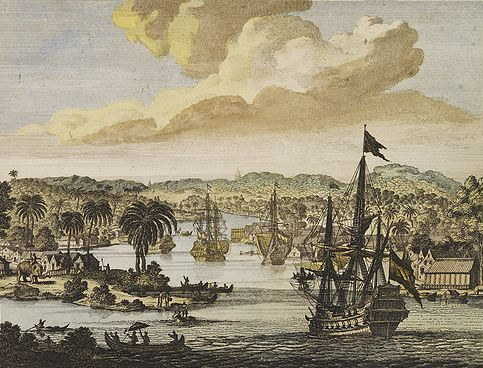
Dutch ships visiting Chittagong during the Mughal period in 1702

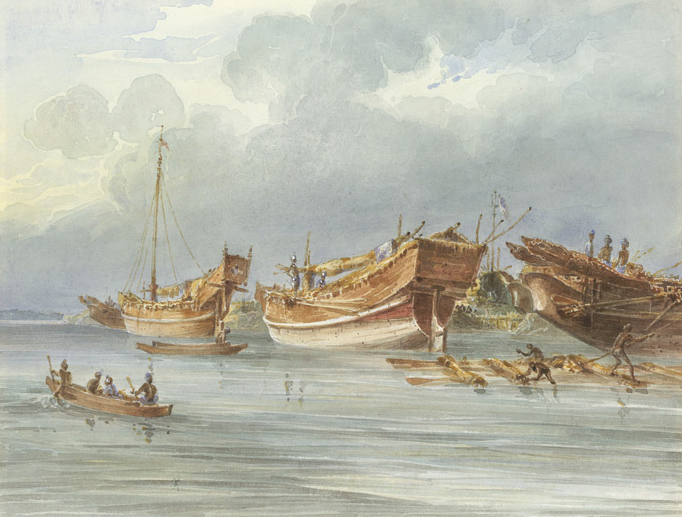
Ships moored off Chittagong in the late 1820s.

In the 2nd century, Chittagong harbor appeared on Ptolemy's map, drawn by the Greco-Roman cartographer Claudius Ptolemy. The map mentions the harbor as one of the finest in the Eastern world.

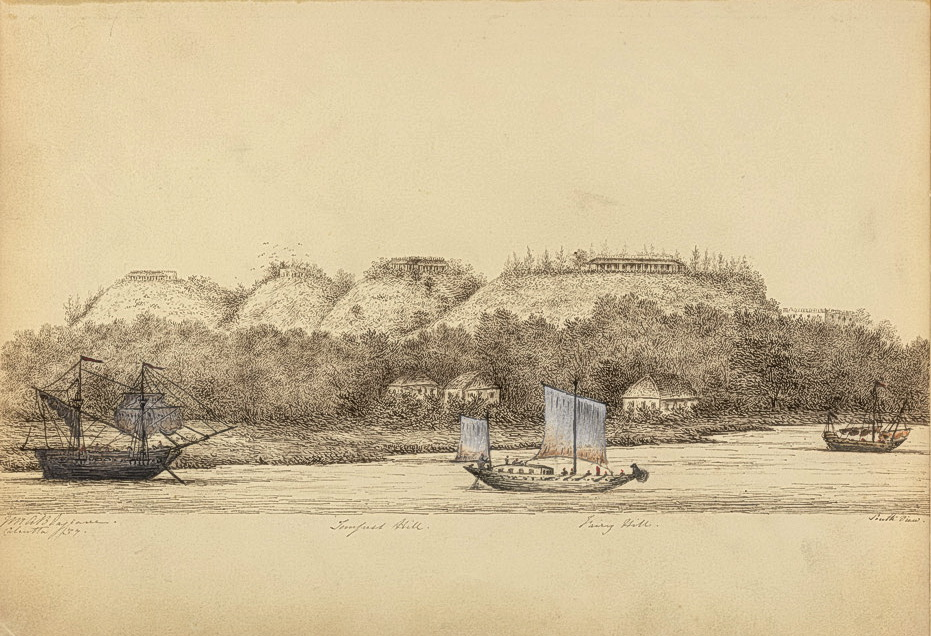
Chittagong harbour, 1800s

Arab traders frequented Chittagong since the 9th century. In 1154, Al-Idrisi noted that merchants from Baghdad and Basra regularly travelled to Chittagong. Arab traders played an important role in spreading Islam in the region. The port appears in the travelogues of Chinese explorers Xuanzang and Ma Huan. The Moroccan explorer Ibn Battuta and the Venetian traveler Niccolo De Conti visited the port in the 14th century. The historical port had ship trade with Africa, Europe, China and Southeast Asia.

The Portuguese settlement in Chittagong centered on the port in the 16th and 17th centuries. After the Portuguese were expelled, Chittagong came under the rule of the Mughal Empire and was named Islamabad. It became an important shipbuilding center, catering to the Mughal and Ottoman navies. After the rise of British dominance in Bengal following the Battle of Plassey and Battle of Buxar, the Nawab of Bengal ceded the port to the British East India Company in 1772.

=== Modern ===
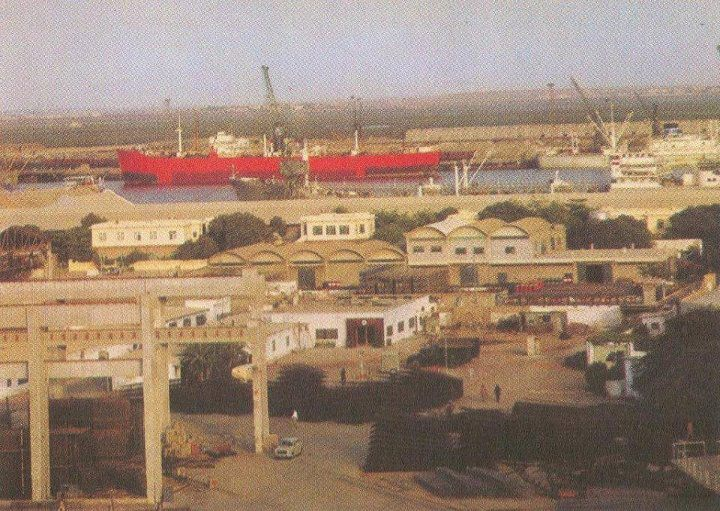
Chittagong port in 1960

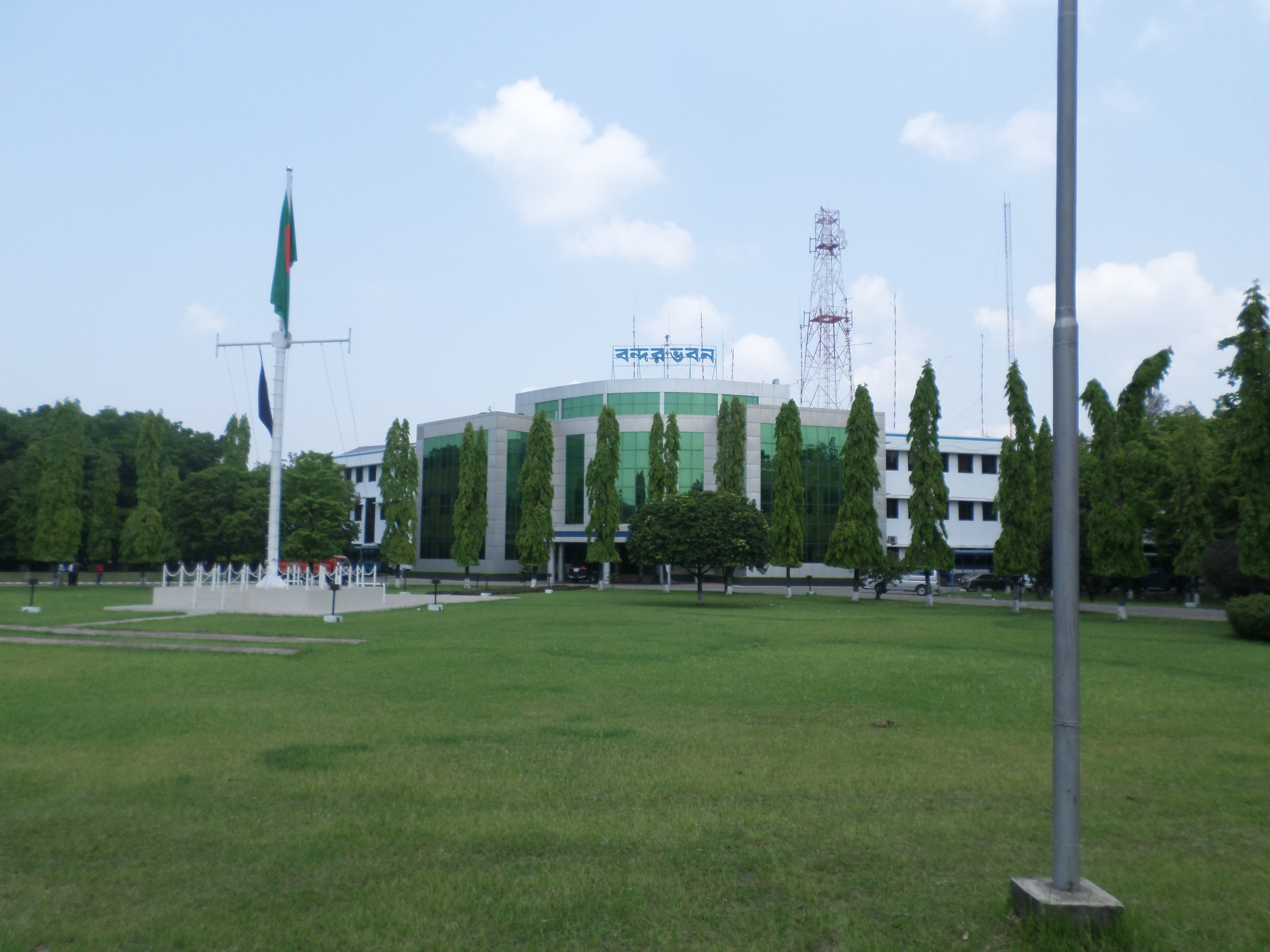
Chittagong Port Authority Administrative Building

The modern Chittagong port was organized in 1887 under the Port Commissioners Act in the British Indian Empire. The port began formal operations under a commissioner in 1888. Its busiest trade links were with British Burma, including the ports of Akyab and Rangoon; and other Bengali ports, including Calcutta, Dhaka and Narayanganj. In the year 1889–90 the port handled exports totalling 125,000 tons. The Strand Road was built beside the harbour. Between 1905 and 1911, Chittagong was the chief seaport of Eastern Bengal and Assam. It was made the terminus of the Assam Bengal Railway. Hence, the port's hinterland included all of colonial Assam (modern Northeast India). Trade between British India and British Burma rapidly increased in the early 20th century. The Bay of Bengal became one of the busiest shipping hubs in the world, rivaling the traffic of ports on the Atlantic. In 1928, the British government declared Chittagong as a "Major Port" of British India. Chittagong was important for the petroleum industry that developed in Assam and Burma. It was used for jute and rice trading. During World War II, Chittagong port was used by Allied Forces in the Burma Campaign.

After the partition of British India, the governor general of the Dominion of Pakistan, Muhammad Ali Jinnah, visited Chittagong and stressed its importance and future potential. The Chittagong Port Trust was formed in East Pakistan in 1960. 100 employees of the Chittagong Port were killed during the Bangladesh Liberation War in 1971. The Soviet Pacific Fleet was tasked with mine clearing and salvage operations in the port after the war. The port has benefited from the growth of heavy industry and logistics in the Chittagong Metropolitan Area in the years following independence. Trade unionism was strong in the late 1990s.

A major expansion took place with the construction of the New Mooring Terminal in the first decade of the 21st century.

On 29 June 2025, the port was closed due to a strike by National Board of Revenue employees protesting against plans to split the agency. The port reopened the next day following negotiations between the strikers and the finance ministry.

== Management ==
The Chittagong Port Authority is responsible for the port's management.

== Facilities ==
=== Berths ===
| Type of berth | Quantity of berths | Notes |
|---|---|---|
| General cargo berths | 6 | |
| Container berths | 14 | |
| Dolphin Oil Jetty | 3 | For handling crude and product oil vessels of up to 186 meters |
| Grain Silo Jetty | 1 | Vessels up to 186 meters |
| Cement Clinker Jetty | 1 | Cement Clinker Jetty |
| TSP | 1 | Vessel up to 175.25 meters |
| Chittagong Urea Fertilizer Jetty | 1 | Vessels up to 176 meters and can be loaded up to maximum draft of 8.5 meters |
| KAFCO Urea Jetty | 1 | Vessel having LOA of 186 meters will be allowed to take berth at KAFCO (Urea) |
| KAFCO Ammonia Jetty | 1 | Vessel having LOA up to 186 meters at KAFCO (Ammonia) jetties can be loaded up to a maximum draft of 9.2 meters. |
| Dry Dock Jetties | 3 | |
| River Mooring No. 3 | 1 | Vessels up to 182.9 LOA and 7.76 meters draft for edible oil and POL in bulk |
| River Mooring No. 8 | 1 | Vessels up to 186 meters and 8 meters draft for vegetable oil carrier |
| River Mooring No. 9 | 1 | Vessels up to 186 meters and 6 meters draft for repair of vessel / laying off. |
| River Mooring No. 10 | 1 | Vessels up to 145 meters LOA and 7.5 meters draft for repair of vessel / laying off. |
| UTTJ (United Tank Terminal Jetty) | 1 | Commissioning for loading and unloading operation of oil tanker/vessel since July' 2020. |

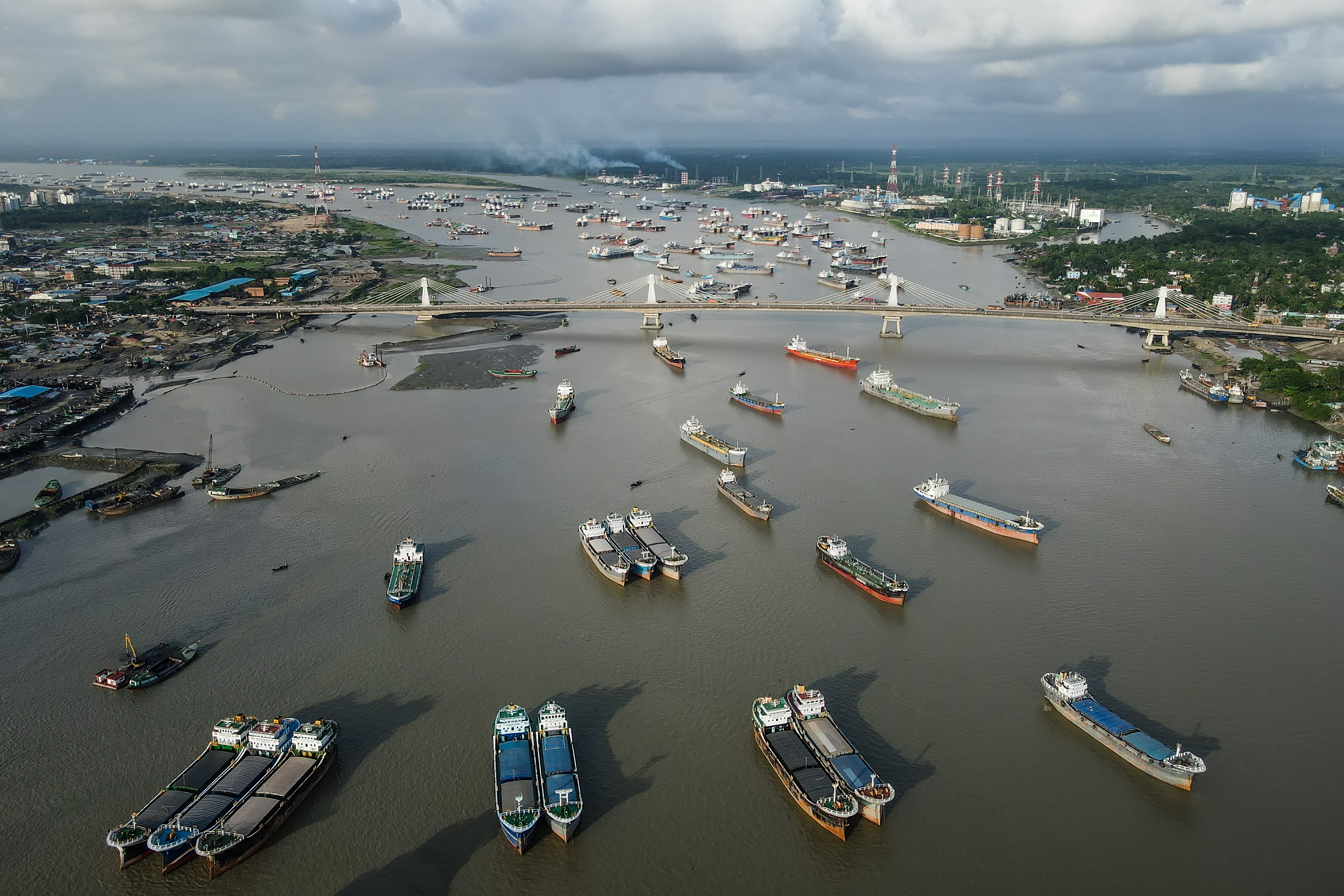
Industries along the port on the Karnaphuli River

=== Container terminals ===
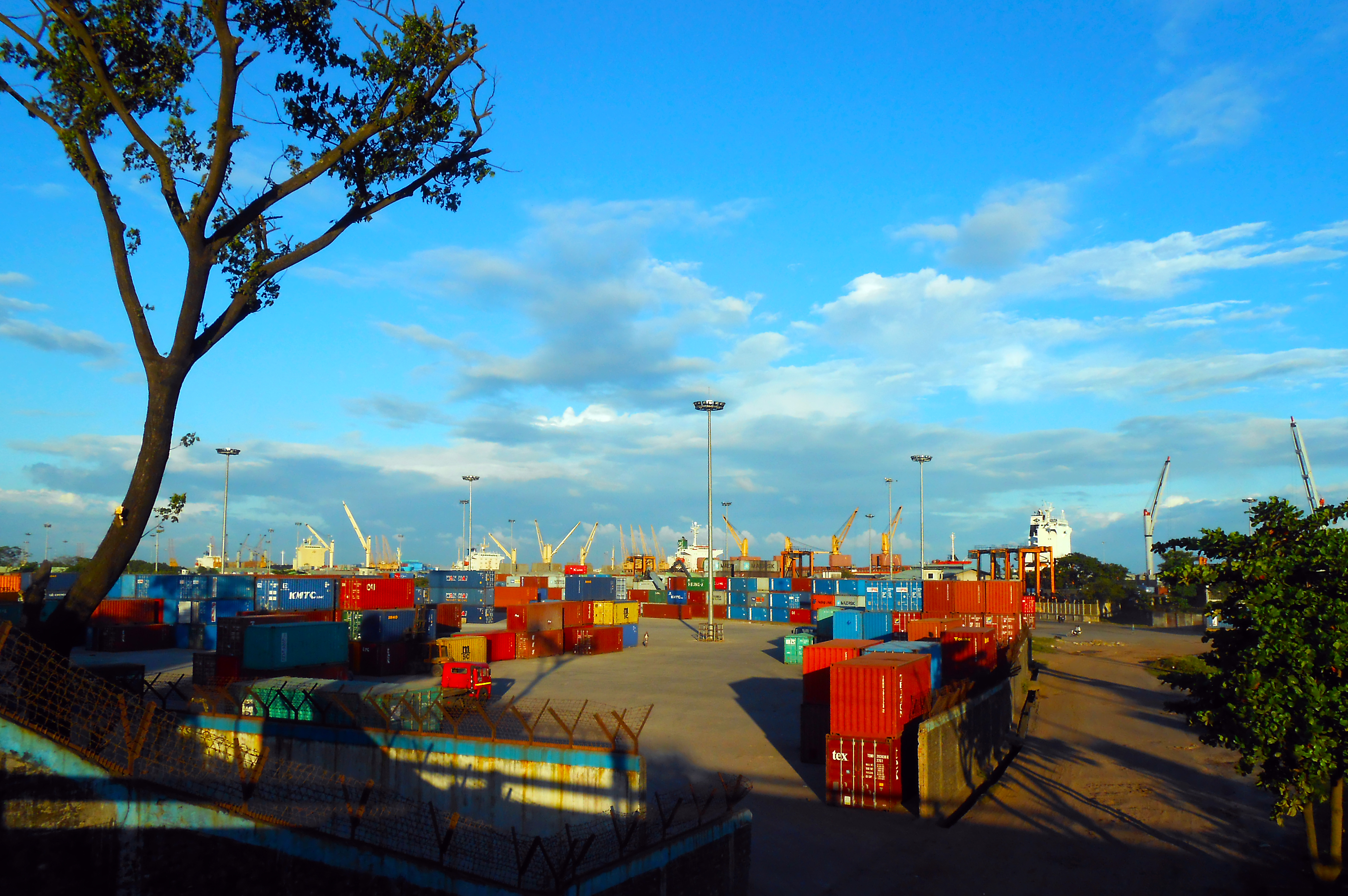
Many private container terminals like this one have been set up near the port

The port features several container terminal facilities, most of which are owned by private companies.

==== Port terminals ====
There are four operational terminal facilities within the port that handle containers and other cargo:

- General Cargo Berth (GCB)
- New Mooring Container Terminal (NCT)
- Chittagong Container Terminal (CCT)
- Patenga Container Terminal (PCT)

==== Off-Docks (Private Inland Container Depots and Container Freight Stations) ====
- KDS Logistics Terminal
- Orient Overseas Container Line (OOCL) Terminal
- Summit Alliance Container Terminal
- Vertex Off Dock Logistic Terminal
- QNS Container Terminal
- Shafi Motors Terminal
- K & T Logistic Terminal
- Esack Brothers Terminal
- Chittagong Container Transportation Company Limited Terminal
- Port Link Logistic Terminal
- M/s. Incontrade Terminal
- M/s. Golden Container Terminal
- M/s. Saber Ahmed Timber Terminal
- M/s. Eastern Logistics Terminal
- B. M. Container Terminal
- Nemsan Container Terminal

=== Industrial terminals ===
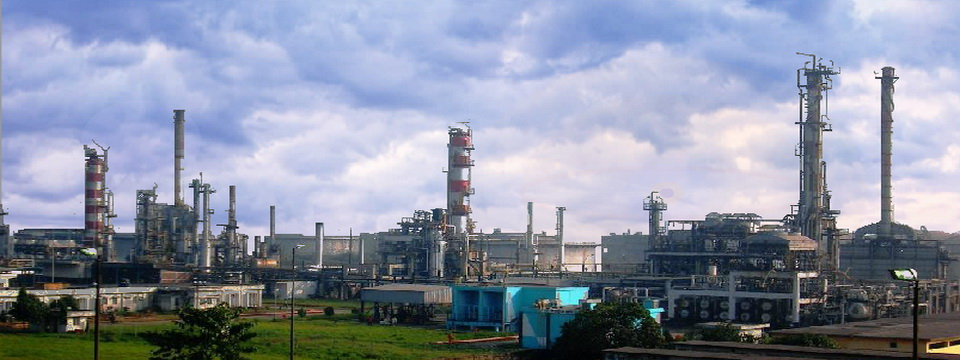
The Eastern Refinery

- Eastern Refinery Terminal
- Karnaphuli Fertilizer Company Limited (KAFCO) Terminal
- Jamuna Oil Company Terminal
- Padma Oil Company Terminal
- Meghna Petroleum Limited Terminal
- Omera Fuels Limited Terminal

== Security ==
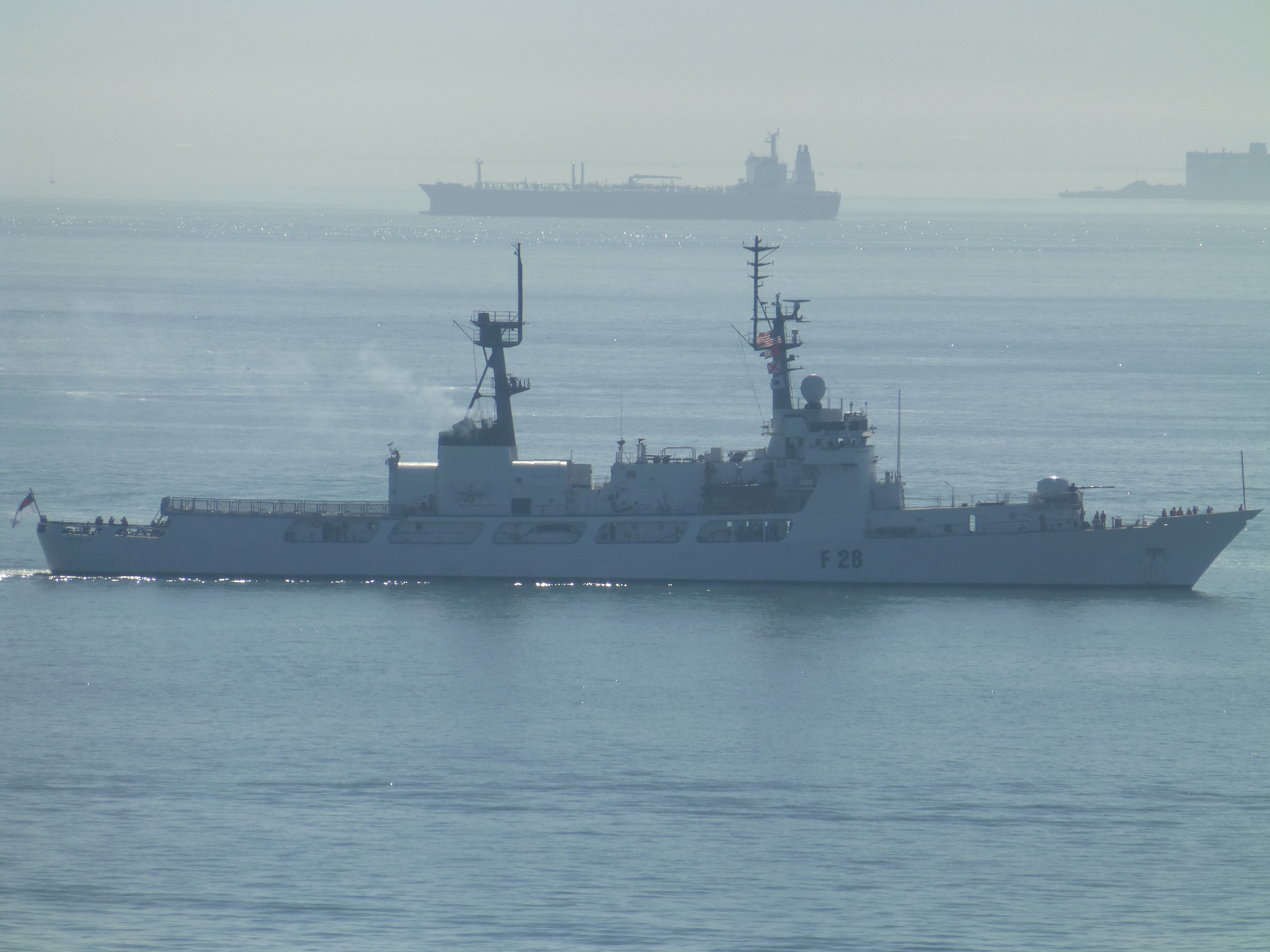
The BNS Somudra Joy is one of two cutters used by the Bangladesh Navy to patrol waters off the port

The Bangladesh Coast Guard is responsible for security in the vicinity of the port.

=== Naval and air base ===
The Bangladesh Navy's largest naval base, the BNS Issa Khan, and the Bangladesh Naval Academy are located in Chittagong port. The port is the home base of most of the Bangladesh Navy fleet, including its submarine fleet. The Chittagong Naval Area often hosts joint exercises with the navies of other countries, as well as visiting foreign naval vessels. A missile launch pad is located near the port. The Bangladesh Air Force maintains its BAF Zahurul Haq Air Base near the port. In addition, the Bangladesh Navy operates an airborne maritime surveillance wing.

=== Piracy ===
The year 2000 had the highest number of piracy attacks in the recorded history of Chittagong. Many of the raids resulted in the theft of mooring lines and zinc anode and other movable ship equipments. In 2005 it had the highest pirate attacks in a port area in the world. The government of Bangladesh has increased Navy and Coast Guard presence in the area. According to ICC International Maritime Bureau (IMB) 2019 Piracy and Armed Robbery Against Ships Report, incidents in Bangladesh have fallen significantly over the past few years because of the effort of Bangladesh Authorities. There was no incident of piracy or armed robbery in 2019.

== Disasters ==
On the night of Saturday 4 June 2022 at the BM Inland Container Depot (a Dutch-Bangladesh joint venture) fire broke out following explosions in a container full of hydrogen peroxide. The fire continued to spread and the explosions, which shattered the windows of nearby buildings, were felt as far as 4 kilometres (2.5 miles) away. At least 9 firefighters from Bangladesh fire service and civil defense were reported dead; the total death toll reached 49 by the end of the following day.

== See also ==
List of Ports in Bangladesh
