= List of oil and gas companies of Bangladesh =

Company of Bangladesh

This is a list of notable oil and gas companies of Bangladesh.

== B ==
- Bangladesh Petroleum Corporation

== G ==
- Gas Transmission Company Limited

== J ==
- Jamuna Oil Company

== M ==
- Meghna Petroleum Limited

== P ==
- Padma Oil Company
- Petrobangla

== T ==
- Titas Gas
