= Eastern Lubricants Blenders Limited =

Bangladeshi organization

- Abbreviation: ELBL
- Formation: 1963
- Type: Government-owned limited company
- Headquarters: Dhaka, Bangladesh
- Region served: Bangladesh
- Official language: Bengali
- Key people: A. B. M. Azad (Chairperson); Mohammad Shahidul Alam (Managing Director); Abu Mohammad Saifuddin (Secretary)
- Parent organization: Bangladesh Petroleum Corporation
- Website: elbl.portal.gov.bd

Eastern Lubricants Blenders Limited (Bengali: ইস্টার্ন লুব্রিকেন্ট ব্লেন্ডার লিমিটেড) is a subsidiary of the government-owned Bangladesh Petroleum Corporation. This organization is listed on the Dhaka Stock Exchange in 1976 and traded as EASTRNLUB.

== History ==
The company had officially started operations in 1960. Eastern Lubricants Blenders Limited started production in 1963 as the East Pakistan Lubricants Blenders Limited in Chittagong; it was owned by Burmah Oil Company. By 1969, it was one of three lubricant companies in East Pakistan.

Since the Independence of Bangladesh in 1971, Eastern Lubricants Blenders Limited had a monopoly position till the early 2000s when other lubricant companies where allowed to operate in the market. 12 percent of the shares of the Eastern Lubricants Blenders Limited are listed on the stock exchange.

In 1977, the Eastern Lubricants Blenders Limited became a subsidiary of Bangladesh Petroleum Corporation.

In 2004, the company declared 25 percent dividends.

In 2009, the company shares were moved from A category to B category.

In 2015, Eastern Lubricants Blenders Limited became the official distributors of GS Yuasa International, a Japanese company, in Bangladesh.

Eastern Lubricants Blenders Limited signed an agreement in July 2019 to sell bitumen to Bangladesh Petroleum Corporation.

The company's profit increased in 2021 due to a decline in global oil prices. It sells oil to its three sister companies, Jamuna Oil, Meghna Petroleum, and Padma Oil. It signed an agreement with KB Petrochemicals Limited, a joint venture of Sena Kalyan Sangstha. In February 2026, the government removed the chairman of the Eastern Lubricants Blenders Limited, A. H. M. Nurul Islam.
