= Energy in Bangladesh =

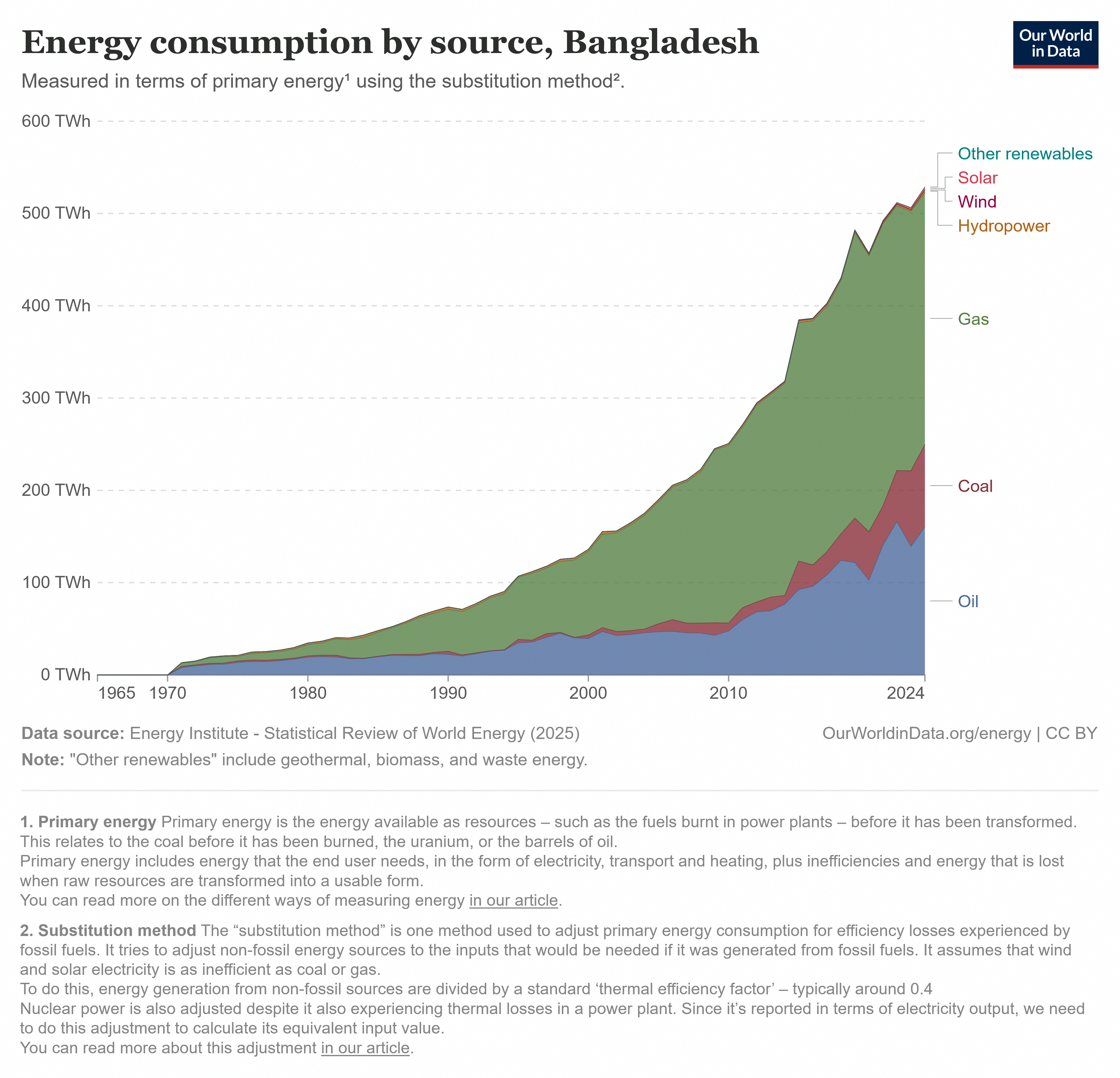
Energy consumption by source, Bangladesh

Energy in Bangladesh describes energy and electricity production, consumption and import in Bangladesh. Bangladesh is an emerging economy with a fast-growing energy consumption. Fossil fuels account for 98.9% of the country's energy consumption. Dwindling natural gas production has forced the country to become increasingly reliant on imported energy, exposing it to price fluctuations in the international market. Investment into nuclear energy and renewable energy production is aiming to mitigate this.

The country is an import dependent energy market.

== Overview ==
Energy calculation method was changed in 2026 resulting in changing values. Energy mix of Bangladesh (in TWh):

Year	Gas	Oil	Coal	Hydro	Solar	Wind	Nuclear	Other renewables (including geothermal and biomass)
1971	3.667125	8.135291	1.0869898	0.48611107	0	0	0	0
1972	3.667125	9.919018	1.0869863	0.48611107	0	0	0	0
1973	5.880875	11.208105	1.41251	0.9194444	0	0	0	0
1974	7.112875	11.659565	1.2555631	0.67499995	0	0	0	0
1975	4.956875	13.631796	1.4531918	1.2111111	0	0	0	0
1976	7.2476254	14.748876	1.4357585	1.3722222	0	0	0	0
1977	8.1235	14.522806	1.4997001	1.2138889	0	0	0	0
1978	8.614375	15.460121	1.4531918	1.4055555	0	0	0	0
1979	9.865625	17.112337	1.081183	1.6305555	0	0	0	0
1980	12.291124	19.291002	1.4443297	1.6194444	0	0	0	0
1981	13.613856	19.89294	1.4847789	1.736111	0	0	0	0
1982	17.674847	19.62132	1.7986726	1.4527777	0	0	0	0
1983	19.667187	17.547495	1.0179855	1.8388888	0	0	0	0
1984	22.700663	17.682053	0.40738726	2.4916666	0	0	0	0
1985	25.780474	19.738766	0.56964904	2.0527778	0	0	0	0
1986	29.07015	21.275486	0.86029434	1.2499999	0	0	0	0
1987	34.155926	20.945486	1.3543715	1.4361111	0	0	0	0
1988	40.201077	20.984262	1.3950651	1.875	0	0	0	0
1989	42.49867	22.941954	1.4531918	2.5555556	0	0	0	0
1990	45.742012	22.227821	3.272589	2.4555554	0	0	0	0
1991	47.107487	20.622862	1.0463046	2.3277776	0	0	0	0
1992	51.370163	23.004263	0.98236287	2.211111	0	0	0	0
1993	57.50253	25.769167	0.36620545	1.6888888	0	0	0	0
1994	60.985718	26.85683	0.34295708	2.3527777	0	0	0	0
1995	67.42334	34.853485	3.7317994	1.0333333	0	0	0	0
1996	72.36467	35.606483	2.0461009	2.0527778	0	0	0	0
1997	71.13274	40.876934	3.7550595	1.9972221	0	0	0	0
1998	76.86446	45.055756	1.0811714	2.4027777	0	0	0	0
1999	83.80357	40.18385	0.53477067	2.3138888	0	0	0	0
2000	90.581894	39.487724	3.8364346	2.0805554	2.77778E-05	0	0	0.13109374
2001	101.43209	47.166737	4.0689416	2.743094	3.8674E-05	0	0	0.10375
2002	106.71138	42.876194	4.249137	2.052055	0.000180822	0	0	0.21687499
2003	114.7843	43.893665	4.0631266	2.0408719	0.002316076	0	0	0.18828125
2004	123.40232	45.732254	4.0689416	2.0298104	0.005186992	0	0	0.1265
2005	132.63358	46.99634	8.347995	2.0134408	0.009145161	0	0	0.11234375
2006	143.63368	47.271736	12.68387	2.0026739	0.014526738	0.004278075	0	0.140625
2007	153.36371	45.713196	10.351397	1.9920213	0.02406117	0.004255319	0	0.17384374
2008	163.7642	45.39375	10.896066	2.5065963	0.04014248	0.007651715	0	0.17290625
2009	187.46739	42.925915	13.61483	1.0944881	0.06588976	0.013385827	0	0.084875
2010	192.53728	47.633118	8.675767	1.8984374	0.115375	0.01328125	0	0.0663125
2011	195.82149	60.019775	12.915543	2.2590673	0.3203083	0.013212436	0	0.10925001
2012	213.3628	68.356895	10.657114	2.0025773	0.40200254	0.01314433	0	0.076937504
2013	219.52786	69.63952	14.760409	1.8628612	0.4969207	0.012994885	0	0.11781251
2014	230.2227	76.66483	9.351047	1.4413574	0.58906615	0.012928752	0	0.14125
2015	258.54062	92.68446	30.633013	2.2737885	0.6732152	0.012863291	0	0.09315625
2016	264.50946	96.11049	23.035818	2.2226949	0.552598	0.012766331	0	0.07321875
2017	265.92673	108.25354	25.117134	2.5738204	0.72881997	0.0127025	0	0.13571875
2018	274.29	124.19397	28.568832	2.1527638	0.78353983	0.012639303	0	0.09665625
2019	309.3438	121.87268	48.06491	2.0373545	0.9258168	0.012576732	0	0.1093125
2020	299.15314	102.776375	52.346832	1.7300512	1.1331061	0.012580051	0	0.109718755
2021	306.08908	140.56749	42.310978	1.6794761	1.5090765	0.012514778	0	0.09996875
2022	286.87222	166.14375	55.396626	1.9042422	1.5928854	0.012484029	0	0.03653125
2023	281.25888	139.36922	81.77186	1.6672456	2.2563024	0.04044522	0	0.03653125
2024	273.2437	160.46597	89.218735	2.4239051	3.0936098	0.23703243	0	0.036631335
2025	273.76	169.10	117.68	0.88	1.61	0.06	0	0.04

Following independence in 1971, the country's energy was primarily derived from oil, gas, coal and hydropower in decreasing order of importance. People in rural areas were mostly dependent on dry leaves and woods for cooking and using kerosene lamp or flashlight at night. The country was energy poor with lack of energy affecting every part of the economy.

As the country suffered through mismanagement, corruption, and lack of a coherent energy policy, the country continued to be dependent upon expensive imported oil. This was somewhat alleviated as the countries abundant gas fields were surveyed, explored and drilled, which presented its own challenges.

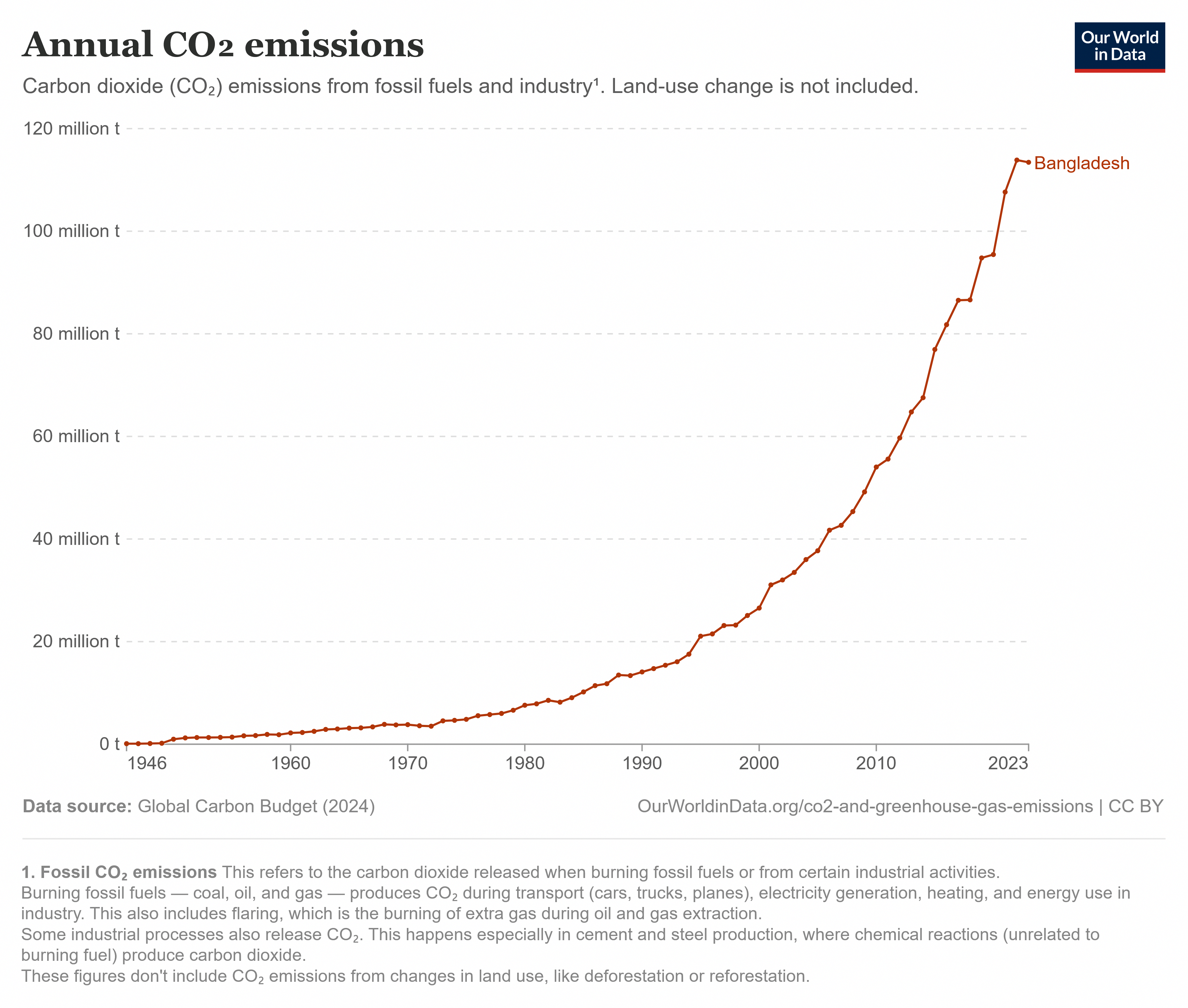
CO2 emissions Bangladesh

The energy demand in Bangladesh is increasing rapidly with increase in GDP. However, initiatives taken to quickly raise capacity without public procurement process has led to rapid increase in both electricity cost and subsidies.

Dwindling gas reserves, a slow uptake in adopting solar and wind energy, volatility in price of the fossil fuel in global market presents contemporary challenges for the energy sector of the country. Slow construction, opaque contracts, and expensive initial investment is hampering new power generation projects such as Rooppur Nuclear Power Plant.

=== 2020s ===
In 2022, following Russian invasion of Ukraine, Bangladesh entered a prolonged depression due to rising fuel import cost. This rapidly inflated cost of a dollar from 89 BDT in the exchange market to 123 BDT in 2026 in several bursts, hurting Bangladesh's GDP growth after years of progress. Electricity production fell for the first time, other than in 2020 due to covid pandemic, in the countries history. In addition, the foreign reserve dwindled dramatically.

In 2026, the US-Israel invasion of Iran triggered another energy crisis. This time fuel was rationed and long lines formed outside petrol stations. Rolling blackout became common occurrence. Gas prices for households were raised sharply. A refinery in Chattogram shut down due to lack of crude import.

== Fossil fuel ==
=== Gas ===
Gas Balance in Bangladesh till 2025

Natural gas in Bangladesh is the most important energy source from an energy security standpoint. Bangladesh is a natural gas rich countries with its gas basins containing nearly pure methane gas with other gases in lower proportion. Since, 2018 Bangladesh has been facing reduction in production of natural gas. Lack of state investment in exploration and drilling of new gas field is now causing Bangladesh's industrial plants to grind to a halt. Bangladesh is now critically dependent upon imported gas from west Asia, such as Qatar for its agricultural raw material, manufacturing industries, combined power plants, transportation and residential cooking.

=== Oil ===
Bangladesh only has a single oil refinery called Eastern Refinery Limited in Chattogram.

=== Coal ===
Coal is another important raw material for energy production in power plants. The largest coal mining operation in Bangladesh is Barapukuria coal mine. Ultra critical thermal power plants utilize coal for sovereign energy generation. A scandal related to coal mining and misappropriation was uncovered in 2018.

== Other energy sources ==
=== Biomass ===
Biomass such as straw, firewood, leaves, wood chip, dung are still used in rural areas as heat sources in cooking. Use of biomass for cooking is a major source of indoor air pollution and death in Bangladesh. Most Bangladeshi household do not have proper ventilation. In South Asia, Maldives 99% of the population has access to clean cooking compared to 23% in Bangladesh as of 2022.

== Electricity ==
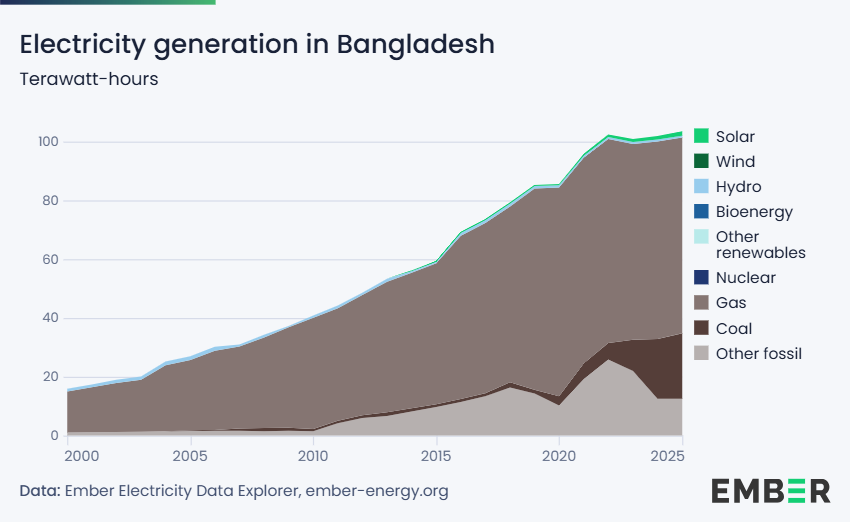
Electricity generation in Bangladesh in terawatt-hours

The electricity sector in Bangladesh operates using a single national grid, managed by the state-owned Power Grid Company of Bangladesh (PGCB), with an installed capacity of 25,700 MW as of June 2022. Bangladesh's energy sector is not up to the mark. However, per capita energy consumption in Bangladesh is considered higher than the production. Electricity was introduced to the country on 7 December 1901.

Electricity is the major source of power for most of the country's economic activities. Bangladesh's total installed electricity generation capacity (including captive power) is 27,840 MW, while the maximum production ever attained was 16,477 MW. It was 15,351 megawatts (MW) as of January 2017 and 20,000 megawatts in 2018.

The largest energy consumers in Bangladesh are industries and the residential sector, followed by the commercial and agricultural sectors.

Bangladesh will need an estimated 34,000 MW of power by 2030 to sustain its economic growth of over 7 percent.

Problems in Bangladesh's electric power sector include high system losses, delays in completion of new plants, low plant efficiency, erratic power supply, electricity theft, blackouts, and shortages of funds for power plant maintenance. Overall, the country's generation plants have been unable to meet system demand over the past decade.

On the 2nd of November, 2014, electricity was restored after a day-long nationwide blackout. A transmission line from India had failed, which "led to a cascade of failures throughout the national power grid," and criticism of "old grid infrastructure and poor management." However, in a recent root-cause analysis report the investigating team has clarified that the fault was actually due to internal lack of coordination and poor health of transmission and distribution infrastructure that caused the blackout.

On 4 October 2022, 70–80% of the country's 168 million residence were hit with blackouts and only 45% of residences were restored with power by nightfall. There was a shortage of natural gas because of the 2021–present global energy crisis where 77 natural gas power plants had insufficient fuel to meet demand. The electricity sector in Bangladesh is heavily reliant on natural gas. The government stopped buying spot price liquefied natural gas in June 2022; they were importing 30% of their LNG on the spot market this year down from 40% last year. They are still importing LNG on futures exchange markets. (Full article...)

== Renewable energy ==
According to the Bangladesh's Power Sector Master Plan 2016 (PSMP–2016), the country has the potential to generate a combined 3.6 GW of electricity from renewable energy sources. Another research has estimated that the potential from wind power alone stands at 20 GW.

The government of Bangladesh has approved the construction by private developers of 19 on-grid solar parks, with would have cumulative generation capacity of 1070 MW.

Bangladesh has planned to produce 10% of total power generation by 2020 from renewable energy sources like wind, waste, and solar energy. The country plans to increase its renewable energy share to 17% by 2041 under its Intended Nationally Determined Contribution (INDC) commitment to reduce greenhouse gas emissions by 5% until 2030.

The country's prospect of geothermal energy extraction has also been discussed by researchers. Studies carried out by geologists suggested geothermal resources in northwest and southeast region.

== See also ==
- Electricity sector in Bangladesh
- Energy law
- List of oil and gas companies of Bangladesh
