= MJL Bangladesh Limited =

Company in Bangladesh

MJL Bangladesh PLC
- Type: Public
- Traded as: DSE: MJLBD
- Industry: Fuel & Power
- Founded: 1998 in Dhaka, Bangladesh
- Headquarters: Mobil House, Gulshan Avenue, Dhaka, Bangladesh
- Area served: Bangladesh
- Key people: Azam J Chowdhury (Managing Director)
- Products: Lube oil; Oil products; Petrochemicals
- Revenue: ▲US$250 million (2019)
- Net income: ▲US$14 million (2019)
- Subsidiaries: Omera Petroleum Limited; Omera LPG; Omera Cylinders Limited; MJL & AKT Petroleum Company Limited
- Website: mjlbl.com

MJL Bangladesh PLC (Bengali: এমজেএল বাংলাদেশ লিমিটেড) (DSE: MJLBD, CSE: MJLBD) widely known as Mobil Bangladesh, formerly known as Mobil Jamuna Lubricants Limited, is a company that is jointly owned by Jamuna Oil Company, a subsidiary of government-owned Bangladesh Petroleum Corporation and EC Securities Limited, a subsidiary of East Coast Group. Azam J Chowdhury is the managing director of the MJL Bangladesh Limited. M. Mukul Hossain is the chief executive officer of the company. It markets products of ExxonMobil as the strategic alliance partner of the company in Bangladesh.

== History ==
MJL Bangladesh Limited was established as Mobil Jamuna Lubricants Limited in 1998 by Jamuna Oil Company, a subsidiary of the state owned Bangladesh Petroleum Corporation and Mobil Corporation. The company was founded at the initiative of Mobil. In 2003, a Lube Oil Blending Plant was established by the company; which was the first lube oil factory in Bangladesh. The base oil to blend lubricant products in the factory comes directly from ExxonMobil. ExxonMobil disinvested from the company in 2003 that made EC Securities Limited the largest shareholder of the company.

In 2010, MJL Bangladesh Limited entered into the stock market by issuing IPO worth 4.60 billion taka on Dhaka Stock Exchange; setting a record for the second largest IPO in Bangladesh.

In 2013, MJL Bangladesh Limited signed an agreement with AKT Petroleum Ltd to launch a joint venture in Myanmar to market Mobil branded lubricant's in the country. The company owns Omera LPG which sells liquefied petroleum gas for domestic consumption. In 2017, the company gave 45 percent cash dividend to its shareholders. It's profit in 2017 was 1.9 billion taka. In 2018, profits rose by 14 percent for the company.

In 2020, sales of the company declined for the first time in three years.

== Subsidiaries ==
=== Omera Petroleum Limited ===
Omera Petroleum Limited is a subsidiary of MJL Bangladesh Limited. Omera Petroleum Limited manufactures and distributes liquefied petroleum gas (LPG) in Bangladesh.

=== Omera Cylinders Limited ===
Omera Cylinders Limited manufactures cylinders and works as a backward integration company.

=== MJL & AKT Petroleum Company Limited ===
MJL & AKT Petroleum Company Limited is a joint venture between MJL Bangladesh Limited and AKT Petroleum Limited that markets Mobil lubricants in Myanmar.
