= Standard Asiatic Oil Company Limited =

Standard Asiatic Oil, Bangladesh, Government-Owned

- Formation: 1965
- Headquarters: Chittagong, Bangladesh
- Official language: Bengali
- Parent organization: Bangladesh Petroleum Corporation
- Website: saocl.gov.bd

Standard Asiatic Oil Company Limited (Bengali: স্ট্যান্ডার্ড এশিয়াটিক অয়েল কোম্পানী লিমিটেড) is a Bangladeshi government owned oil company under Bangladesh Petroleum Corporation. The company sells several grade lubricant, bitumen, diesel oil, furnace Oil, and LP gas.

== History ==
Standard Asiatic Oil Company Limited was established in 1965 as a joint venture of Asiatic Industries Limited and Esso.

After the Independence of Bangladesh in 1972, Esso left the company and their shares were taken over by the government of Bangladesh. The shares of Esso given to Bangladesh Petroleum Corporation, under the Ministry of Power, Energy and Mineral Resources, which now owns 50 per cent of Standard Asiatic Oil Company Limited.

Only Standard Asiatic Oil and Eastern Refinery Limited store oil condensate in Bangladesh.
