= Patenga Container Terminal =

Port cargo facility in Chittagong, Bangladesh

The Patenga Container Terminal (PCT) is a container handling facility at the Port of Chittagong in Bangladesh. It is the country’s first foreign-operated terminal.

The terminal sits between Chittagong Dry Dock and Chittagong Boat Club, near the estuary of the Karnaphuli River. PCT occupies 32 acres of land. It features three 200-metre container jetties and one 220-metre dolphin oil jetty. Due to height restrictions owing to aircraft operations at the Shah Amanat International Airport and a Bangladesh Air Force facility nearby, one of the three container jetties cannot host gantry cranes and the crane height at the other two is limited to 42 feet. The terminal has four ship-to-shore (STS) cranes and 14 rubber-tyred gantry (RTG) cranes. The terminal was originally designed to handle 450,000–500,000 TEUs annually. It is operated by RSGT Bangladesh, a subsidiary of the Red Sea Gateway Terminal International (RSGTI).

The Concession Agreement Signing Ceremony with RSGTI in 2023

== History ==
The 2015 ADB-funded Strategic Master Plan for Chittagong Port report recommended developing a new Multi-Purpose Terminal (MPT). The final report recommended that parts of General Cargo Berth (GCB) be transitioned into Karnaphuli Container Terminal (KCT 1) for operations under Public–private partnership (PPP), while planning the new Bay Container Terminal (BCT) on the coast of Patenga to meet the longer-term demand at the port. The report indicated that the location of BCT would make it a more technically feasible and preferable option than Patenga Container Terminal (PCT) at the considered site given the geographic constraints. The height restriction due to its proximity to the airport nearby was also reflected in a later 2016 report by Japan International Cooperation Agency.

As Bangladesh commissioned a detailed feasibility study for BCT, in April 2017 the Chittagong Port Authority (CPA) started its work on PCT to cope with the near-term growth of containers and other cargo at the port, and it planned for a 2019 completion. The construction was approved by the government in June 2017 and the implementation deadline was extended three times. The Bangladesh Army was involved with the project through a delegated procurement basis.

2018 photo depicting ongoing construction work

In July 2019, Bangladesh's Ministry of Shipping signed a memorandum of understanding (MoU) with RSGT. On 3 March 2021, Cabinet Committee on Economic Affairs (CCEA) formally approved the project to "equip, operate and maintain" the terminal in principle. On 28 October 2021, PPPA reportedly signed an MoU with Saudi Arabia's Ministry of Investment and on 23 February 2022, in its government-to-government (G2G) meeting with Bangladesh, the Saudi government nominated the RSGT for a PPA. At the time, there remained competing proposals from other operators and one interested operator was reportedly awaiting a response on their proposal from the Bangladesh government. In August 2022, Bangladesh's Public-Private Partnership Authority (PPPA) entered into a Transaction Advisory Services Agreement with International Finance Corporation (IFC) for operator selection.

After its completion in June 2022, the terminal saw its first trial run in November 2022 but was not made operational due to the delayed operator recruitment. On 11 March 2023, the Ministry of Shipping signed a framework agreement with RSGT. However, on 6 December 2023, CPA signed the final concession agreement with RSGTI, a company registered in the United Kingdom on 7 June 2022. The agreement was concluded under a G2G-PPP arrangement for a 22-year term.

In July 2023, months before the final agreement, RSGTI emerged as the proposed operator in place of its sister concern, RSGT. The technical and financial proposals sought by CPA pursuant to the G2G arrangement with Saudi Arabia were initially submitted under the name of RSGTI. This had created some confusion on Bangladesh's end. The Saudi government then notified Bangladesh that it had nominated RSGTI in place of RSGT and proposals were submitted for a second time on 29 October 2023. In November 2023, the CPA chairman said, "Both the RSGT and the RSGTI are owned by the Saudi government and have almost the same shareholders". A report from December 2023 quoted a PPPA official stating that Bangladesh's G2G policy required full ownership by the country involved and while 35% of RSGT's stake was China-owned, the newly-formed RSGTI fully belonged to Saudi Arabia. The 2023 Annual Report of SISCO Holding, which indirectly holds a stake in RSGTI through its investment vehicle Red Sea Ports Development International Limited (RSPDI), highlighted the PCT deal as its "first steps" towards RSGT’s international expansion strategy.

Following the change in government, in October 2024, a number of allegations surrounding the terminal were voiced, including the use of political influence, with ex-officials involved with the project calling the RSGTI deal a compromise of national interest citing the underutilisation of terminal capacity and limited return on investment for Bangladesh. It was reported that while PPP projects were typically reserved for "greenfield" sites, this project involved a "greyfield" site where CPA had already completed the terminal's construction. The Business Standard quoted a former CPA official questioning the final signing with RSGTI despite the preceding MoU with RSGT. The coverage further cited a former IFC official who alleged a conflict of interest because of IFC's plan to invest in BCT.

== Operations ==
The terminal formally commenced operations on 10 June 2024 through commercial shipments of export containers. After two trial import shipments, the port’s regular import cargo handling was due to start by April 2025. Routine import operations began in May 2025 after the operator installed the required scanners. A CPA official attributed the delay in initiating import handling to the operator needing several permissions from the National Board of Revenue, including the use of scanners. In 2025, the terminal reportedly handled 154,564 TEUs of containers which was less than half of its annual capacity.

In early September 2025, the operator stated that installation of equipment would enable them to handle 500,000-600,000 TEUs annually. In the same month, widespread delays and mounting disruptions were reported in its operation. Its acquisition of 14 rubber-tyred gantry (RTG) cranes manufactured by the Chinese company GENMA for $26 million was expected to arrive by October 2025. The terminal operator also reported that its $30 million purchase of four custom ship-to-shore (STS) cranes from Chinese firm SANY Marine Heavy Industry was scheduled for deployment in early 2026. Designed to accommodate the height restrictions, the STS cranes can lift up to 40 tonnes in single-container operations, 45 tonnes in twin-lift mode and 60 tonnes for specialised cargo. These STS cranes can concurrently service two vessels while allowing two cranes on each vessel. They arrived on 19 June 2026 and their operations were scheduled to begin in mid-July after the cranes were installed and commissioned at the jetty by the supplier.

Meanwhile, in January 2026, The Business Standard reported findings from a post-completion evaluation by the Implementation Monitoring and Evaluation Division (IMED) and highlighted the terminal's underperformance and operational weaknesses, including delays and a number of other irregularities.

The terminal's full-scale operations were inaugurated on 14 July 2026. As of 18 June 2026, the company reported cumulatively handling approximately 351,000 TEUs of containers since its operations began in June 2024.

In October 2026, the terminal operator reported a new vessel-handling productivity record and cited a peak hourly rate of handling 122 TEUs when operating on the vessel MV AMOUREUX of CMA CGM, surpassing the previous record it had set in September. It achieved this through handling 1,524 containers (equivalent to 2,571 TEUs), over 21 hours of operations. The previous productivity record from September was linked to MV WANEN, another gearless CMA CGM vessel which was operated using the terminal's STS cranes. A company official stated that container vessels at the Chittagong port had traditionally averaged around 48 TEUs per hour. However, this figure represented average handling productivity (sustained container throughput) as opposed to the peak hourly productivity recorded for individual vessels.
