= Strand Road =

Strand Road may refer to:

- Johnston Road, a major road in Wan Chai on the Hong Kong Island of Hong Kong
- Strand Road, Kolkata, a thoroughfare in the Indian city of Kolkata (Calcutta)
- Strand Road, Yangon, a major road in downtown Yangon, Myanmar
- Strand Road, Chittagong, a major commercial street in downtown Chittagong, Bangladesh
- Strand Road, the main thoroughfare through Sandymount, Dublin, Ireland
