= Omera LPG =

Liquefied petroleum gas (LPG) brand incorporated in Bangladesh

- Brand Insignia of Omera LPG
- Type: Limited
- Industry: Petroleum Industry
- Headquarters: Dhaka, Bangladesh
- Products: Bottled Liquid Petroleum Gas
- Website: omeralpg.com

Omera LPG is a liquefied petroleum gas (LPG) brand incorporated in Bangladesh that has been developed and owned by Omera Petroleum Limited, a subsidiary of MJL Bangladesh Limited. Omera LPG is engaged in importing, storing, bottling, and distributing LPG in residential, commercial, and industrial sectors.

== History ==
Natural gas dominated as the primary fuel source in the early decades of Bangladesh. The first hydrocarbon exploration in East Bengal took place in 1911 and the first gas reserve was discovered in 1955. The use of natural gas in industrial sectors began in East Bengal in 1955. In 1968, the piped Natural Gas connection was introduced to households of East Pakistan.

In response to the demand for alternative fuel and the growth of the market, Omera Petroleum Limited, a subsidiary of MJL Bangladesh Limited. has launched Omera LPG in the market on March 31, 2015.

Market analysis conducted by LightCastle Partners in 2019 concluded that Bashundhara Group led the LPG market in Bangladesh with a 24% share, while Omera was the second-largest provider, with a 20% market share.

Omera LPG, in partnership with Caritas Internationalis, distributed LPG cylinders among 12,000 refugee households to promote clean and reliable energy source for cooking and heating activities. The project was also taken envisioning to environmental situation development and improved air quality.

Omera LPG has also been seen to take measurements against the COVID-19 Pandemic situation by endorsing PPE to the National Central Jail of Bangladesh.

== Association ==
=== Omera Cylinder Limited ===
Omera Cylinder Limited is a manufacturer of steel LPG cylinders in Bangladesh. It was established in 2015.

=== Omera Gas One Limited ===
Omera Gas One Limited (OGL) signed agreements in 2020 with Meghna Petroleum Limited (MPL), Jamuna Oil Company Limited (JOCL) and Padma Oil Company Limited (POCL) - three oil distribution giants of Bangladesh - to distribute LPG to their gas stations and facilitate conversion of vehicles to LPG there.

== Products and operations. ==
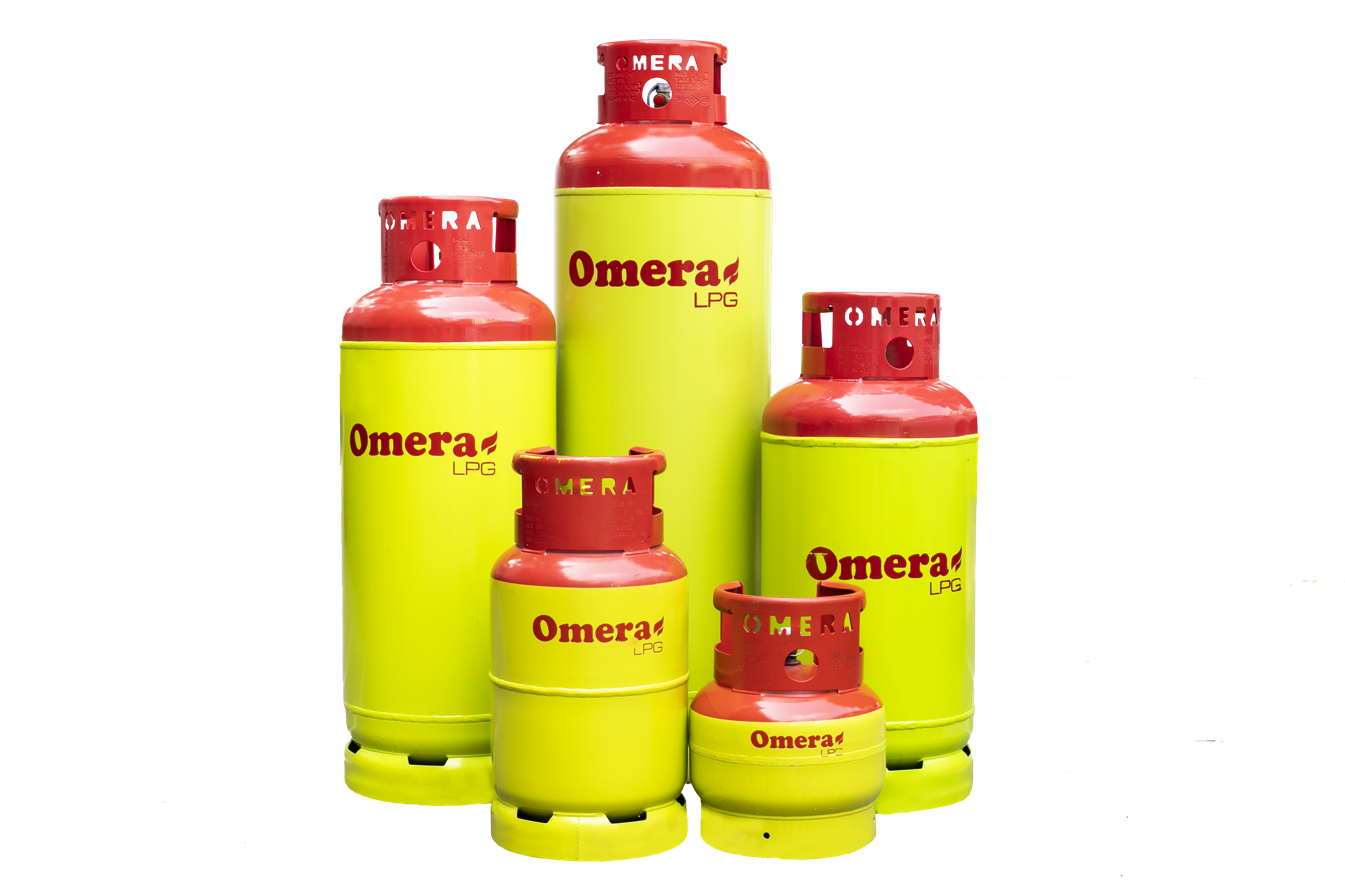
Cylinders of Omera LPG, with iconic color and logo branded on it.

The scale of operations of Omera has been expanded from national to global in 2020, by Omera Cylinders Ltd. exporting cylinders in African Regions.

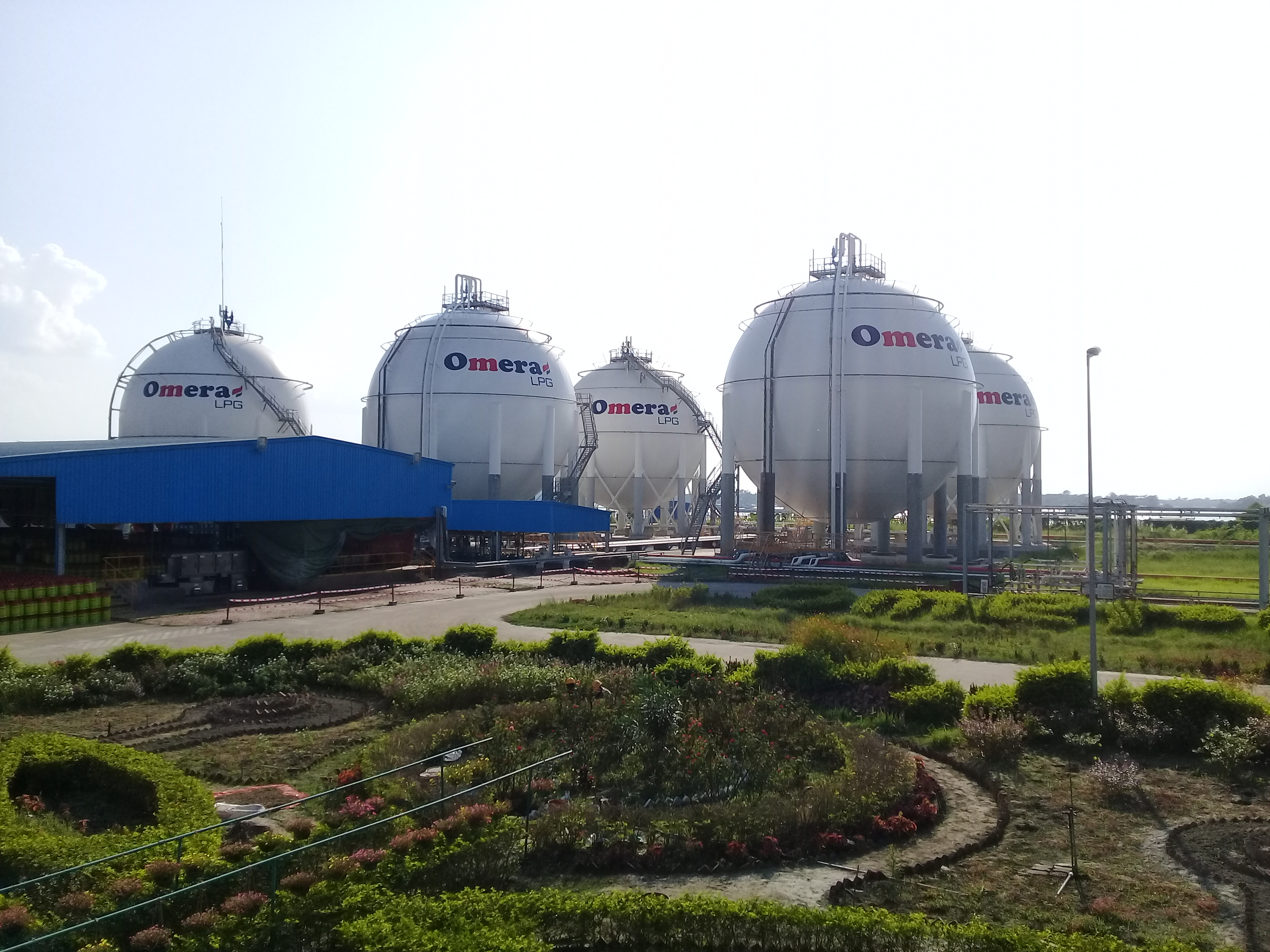
A view of LPG storage of Omera located in Mongla Industrial Area, Bangladesh.

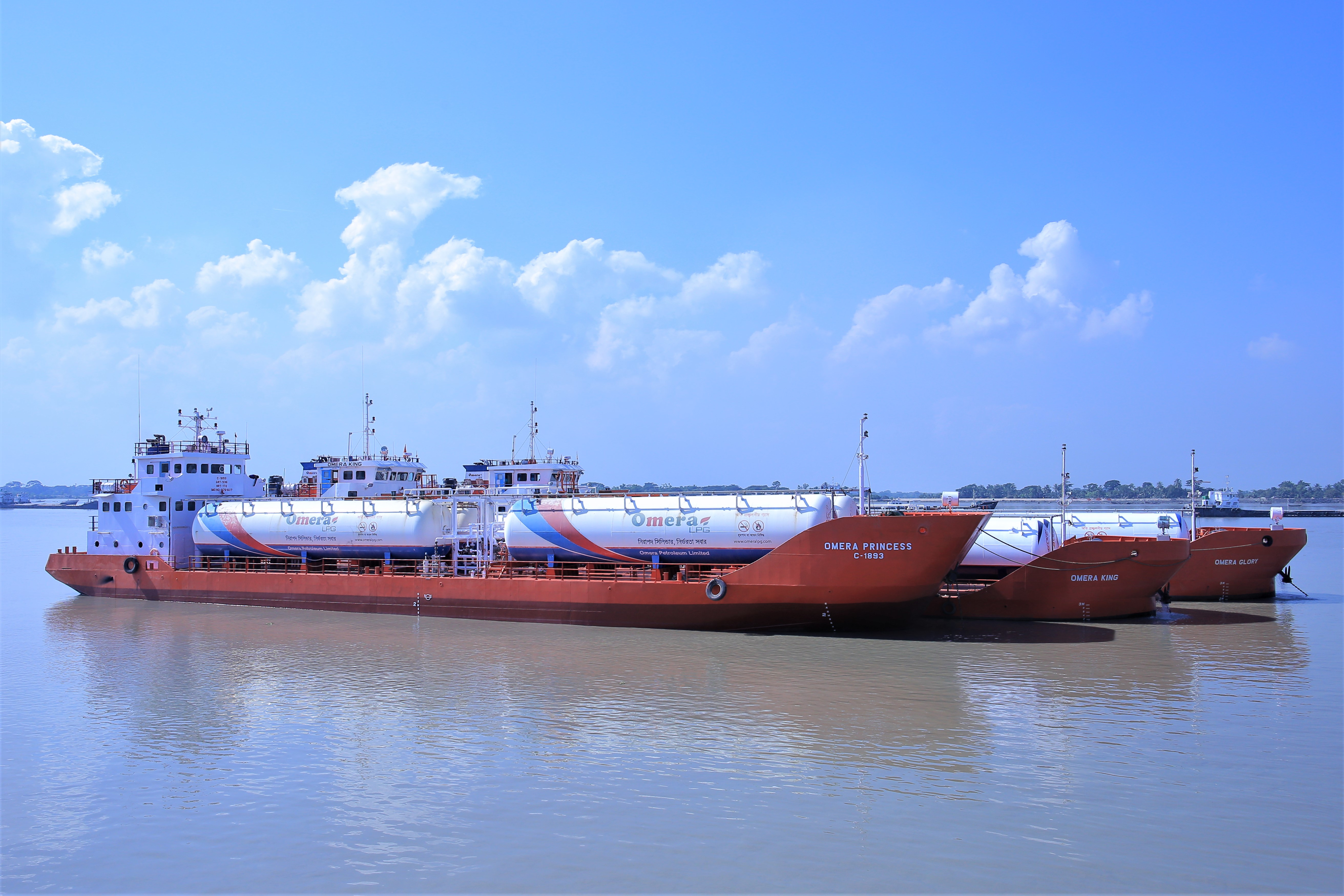
Omera pioneered utilizing waterway facilities of Bangladesh for LPG distribution through its barges. The photos are of Omera Princess (left), Omera King (middle) and Omera Glory (right), all three built by Radiant Shipyard Limited of Narayanganj.
