= Shamim Iskander =

Bangladeshi businessman and flight engineer

Shamim Iskander is a Bangladeshi businessman, retired flight engineer of Biman Bangladesh Airlines, and brother of former prime minister Khaleda Zia.

== Biography ==
Iskander served as an flight engineer of Biman Bangladesh Airlines Limited. In July 2008, The Daily Star report alleged that he had accumulated substantial wealth during the Bangladesh Nationalist Party-led alliance government through commissions connected to aircraft leasing, maintenance contracts, and procurement activities involving Biman Bangladesh Airlines. Reports also stated that the Anti-Corruption Commission was investigating allegations against him. According to former and current airline officials cited in those reports, he was viewed as an influential figure in administrative and commercial matters at Biman during the Bangladesh Nationalist Party rule. Former official of the Prime Minister's Office, A. H. M. Nurul Islam, alleged he was a frequent visitor to the Prime Minister's Office. The allegations were part of wider scrutiny of corruption claims involving public under the Fakhruddin Ahmed Caretaker government rule during the 2006–2008 Bangladesh political crisis. Central Intelligence Cell of the National Board of Revenue sought information on his and his family members bank accounts. His car was seized by Dinajpur police.

In 2007, the Anti-Corruption Commission requested asset declarations from Iskander. Authorities later alleged that information had been concealed in response to the notice, leading to a case being filed at Ramna Police Station in 2008. In July 2008, he was arrested in connection with the asset concealment case after appearing at House No. 6, Shaheed Moinul Road in Dhaka Cantonment when he went to visit Arafat Rahman Koko. He was later produced before the Chief Metropolitan Magistrate Court in Dhaka, where his bail request was not accepted, and he was sent to jail custody by Magistrate A. M. Zulfiquer Hayat. His wife was granted bail. The case had been filed by the Anti-Corruption Commission against him and his wife over allegations of concealing wealth information in statements submitted to the commission. Khandaker Delwar Hossain, General Secretary of the Bangladesh Nationalist Party, alleged Iskander was detained to put pressure on his sister, former Prime Minister Khaleda Zia.

In January 2015, Iskander travelled to Malaysia with other family members following the death of his nephew, Arafat Rahman Koko. The family members went to arrange the return of the body to Bangladesh. In June 2018, he submitted an application to the Ministry of Home Affairs requesting permission for medical treatment of his sister, Khaleda Zia, at United Hospital. In the letter, he stated that he would bear the expenses of the treatment.

In 2016, the High Court rejected an application by Iskander seeking dismissal of the corruption case. He subsequently appealed to the Appellate Division of the Supreme Court. In March 2025, a Dhaka court exempted Iskander and his wife, Kaniz Fatema, from charges in the case after hearing applications from both the defence and prosecution.

In February 2018, he visited Khaleda Zia at the Old Dhaka Central Jail following her imprisonment. He was accompanied by other family members, including his wife Kaniz Fatema, their son Ovik, and Khaleda Zia's sister Selina Rahman. In August 2019, he visited Khaleda Zia at Bangabandhu Sheikh Mujib Medical University during Eid along with other relatives. In March 2020, following the government's decision to temporarily release Khaleda Zia from prison under conditions, he expressed appreciation for the decision. Khaleda Zia returned to her Gulshan residence Feroza Bhaban after spending 776 days in custody and receiving hospital treatment. She was escorted to the house by family members, including Iskander and his wife Kaniz Fatema. The property was reportedly taken on lease from Tanveer Islam, the younger son of retired major and former Bangladesh Nationalist Party state minister Mohammad Quamrul Islam.

In November 2021, he submitted another application to the Ministry of Home Affairs seeking government approval to allow Khaleda Zia to travel abroad for advanced medical treatment. The application requested assistance either through court bail or special permission from the government. In September 2022, he filed a petition seeking an extension of the prison suspension of Khaleda Zia. He also asked Bangladesh Nationalist Party activists to exclude Khaleda Zia from political activities.

== Personal life ==
Islander is married to Kaniz Fatema. They live in Gulshan. Their sons are Ovik Iskandar, Fayek Iskander and Fasbir Iskander. His sisters are former Prime Minister of Bangladesh Khaleda Zia, and Selima Islam. His brother was retired major and member of parliament Sayeed Iskander.
