= Azam J. Chowdhury =

Bangladeshi businessman

- আজম জে. চৌধুরী
- Born: Azam Jahangir Chowdhury; 31 October 1954 (age 71); Moulvibazar, Sylhet, East Pakistan (now Bangladesh)
- Education: Dhaka University
- Occupation: Businessman

Azam J. Chowdhury is a Bangladeshi businessman. He is the managing director of MJL Bangladesh Limited and Chairperson of East Coast Group, The Consolidated Tea & Lands Company Bangladesh Limited, and former chairperson of Prime Bank Limited.

== Early life ==
Chowdhury spent his childhood in Kulaura Upazila. He completed his Secondary School Certificate (SSC) from Navin Chandra High School, Kulaura, and later studied at MC College, Sylhet. He subsequently obtained his bachelor's and master's degrees in English literature from the University of Dhaka.

== Career ==
Chowdhury worked for a businessman in Motijheel where he made connections in the business world and soon launched his own oil trading company.

Chowdhury's business boomed after the government opened the oil industry to private investors. He became the official distributor of Exxon Mobil Corporation in Bangladesh. From 2001 to 2005, Chowdhury worked as the Chairperson of Green Delta Insurance Company Limited. He is a Director of the Central Depository Bangladesh Limited.

In 2003, Chowdhury became the main shareholder of MJL Bangladesh Ltd after Exon disinvested from the company.

Chowdhury was the managing director of Greenways Industries (BD) Limited, which was awarded land by Rajdhani Unnayan Kartripakkha during Bangladesh Nationalist Party government. It was one of 30 plots that were handed over to politicians and businessmen linked to Bangladesh Nationalist Party.

On 13 June 2007, Chowdhury filed an extortion case against Sheikh Selim and former Prime Minister Sheikh Hasina with Gulshan Police Station. After investigation police included the name of Sheikh Rehana. An arrest warrant was issued against Sheikh Rehana who was then in the United States. Chowdhury was missing for three days before he filed the case. On 25 January 2008, he contradicted his initial statement to the police and claimed that his case was only against Sheikh Selim. In September 2008, Sheikh Hasina and Sheikh Selim secured bail in the case from Bangladesh High Court. On 15 December 2008, he announced his intention to withdraw the case and called the case a misunderstanding. In May 2009, the case was officially withdrawn.

On 8 June 2009, Chowdhury was re-elected chairperson of Prime Bank Limited.

In 2010, Chowdhury announced his intention to buy a crude oil tanker.

In 2013, Chowdhury's company, MJL Bangladesh Ltd, formed a joint venture company in Myanmar with Aung Kyun Thar (AKT) Co. He is the chairperson of Consolidated Tea and Lands Company Bangladesh. He bought Artisan Ceramics from Mahmudur Rahman through Consolidated Tea and Lands Company Bangladesh, makers of Finlay tea, for one billion taka.

Chowdhury sits on the Advisory Council of Government of the People's Republic of Bangladesh on Power, Energy and Mineral Resources. He was re-elected chairperson of Prime Bank Limited in 2018.

In 2019, Chowdhury was awarded the businessperson of the year jointly by DHL and The Daily Star. On 19 December 2019, he was re-elected as the president of Bangladesh Association of Publicly Listed Companies. He is a director of Omera Petroleum.

Chowdhury served as the Chairperson of Prime Bank till June 2020. He was succeeded by his son, Tanjil Chowdhury. He donated one thousand Personal Protective Equipment to Bangladesh Jail. In December 2020, he was elected vice-president of the LPG Operators Association of Bangladesh.
