= Prime Bank (Bangladesh) =

Private commercial bank in Bangladesh

- Type: Public limited company
- Traded as: DSE: PRIMEBANK; CSE: PRIMEBANK
- Industry: Banking
- Founded: 1995; 31 years ago in Dhaka, Bangladesh
- Headquarters: Dhaka, Bangladesh
- Key people: Tanjil Chowdhury (Chairman); Md. Shahadat Hossain (Vice Chairman); Nazma Haque (Vice Chairman); Hassan O Rashid (CEO & MD)
- Revenue: ▲BDT 23,837 million (2024)
- Net income: ▲BDT 7,445.76 million (2024)
- Total assets: ▲BDT 548,118.45 million (2024)
- Number of employees: 2,968 employees, which included 710 female employees
- Website: www.primebank.com.bd

Prime Bank PLC. is a Public limited commercial bank in Bangladesh with its headquarters in Dhaka. With 149 branches and 153 ATMs, the bank operates in corporate, consumer, MSME, and sustainable banking. Tanjil Chowdhury, managing director of East Coast Group, is chairman of Prime Bank.

== History ==
Prime Bank was established and commenced operations on 17 April 1995. Islamic Banking operations of Prime Bank Limited started in 1995 with the opening of Islamic banking branch at Dilkusha, Dhaka. The operations of the Islamic banking are supervised by Prime Bank Shari’ah Supervisory Committee. It was incorporated under the Companies Act of 1994. The founders of the bank include Azam J Chowdhury, chairman of East Coast Group. Mizanur Rahman Bhuiyan, charman of Meghna Group (not MGI) was a founding director and chairman of the bank in 2003-2004 period.

The Bank is traded at the Dhaka Stock Exchange and Chittagong Stock Exchange. The bank donated 2 million taka for the Wari-Bateshwar archeological site excavation in May 2008. In February 2009, Bangladesh Bank issued a show cause notice to former top management of the bank, former chairman Salimul Haq and former managing director M Shahjahan Bhuiyan, for irregular transactions during the 2001-2006 Bangladesh Nationalist Party government rule.

Prime Bank is the title sponsor of the 2013 edition of Bangladesh Premier League cricket tournament. They are also the owners of Prime Bank Cricket Club. In July 2014, the Anti-Corruption Commission sued eleven staff members of the bank who had embezzled 926.5 million taka from customers using forged papers.

Azam J Chowdhury was reelected chairman of the bank in June 2018.

In 2020, Prime Bank launched women banking facilities called Neera. This banking includes products that help unbanked women achieve financial freedom and independence. Prime Bank has a countrywide programme to drive financial literacy among the unbanked women of the society.

In October 2021, the bank received 30 million dollar funding from British International Investment.

Prime Bank issued 6 billion taka in bonds in October 2022. During April–June quarter saw the bank's earning increase by 42 per cent.

On 22nd July, following the plane crash at Milestone College at Diabari, Prime Bank pledged to donate BDT 5 crore to help those affected by the tragedy.

== Subsidiaries ==
- Prime Exchange Co. Pte (Singapore) Ltd
- PBL Finance (Hong Kong) Limited
- Prime Bank Foundation
- Prime Bank Securities Limited
- Prime Bank Investment Limited
