= O R Nizam Road =

Coordinates: 22.3606°N 91.8284°E

O R Nizam Road is a major road which crosses the Asian Highway in Chattogram, Bangladesh. The road has been named after Obaidur Rahman Nizam (1902–1970), who was popularly known as O R Nizam. He was the Mayor of Chattogram City for almost 15 years. At the time the position was called Vice Chairman of the Chattogram Municipality, an elected position. The road begins from Zakir Hussain Road and ends at Panchalaish Police Station. It hosts mainly shops, clinics and residential buildings. It passes close to the Chattogram Medical College and other important buildings such as mosques, and schools.There are numerous coaching centres such as RACON Cadet Coaching, Boost up private cadet batch, Sanguine etc

== See also ==
- Strand Road, Chittagong
