= A. H. M. Nurul Islam =

Bangladeshi civil servant

AHM Nurul Islam is a former Bangladeshi civil servant and former secretary to the Prime Minister's Office of Bangladesh during the government of Prime Minister Khaleda Zia. He served as the chairperson at Eastern Lubricants Blenders Limited. He was the chairperson of the Gas Transmission Company Limited.

== Early life ==
Islam was born on 12 August 1950 in Dewan Nagar, Hathazari Upazila, Chittagong District, East Pakistan, Pakistan. He completed his bachelor's in political science and master's in public administration at the University of Dhaka. He completed a postgraduate diploma at the University of Birmingham.

== Career ==
Islam, as the Deputy Commissioner of Feni in 1995, carried out beautification work around Vijay Singh Dighi, a historic lake near Feni town. In August 2003, he was appointed as an additional secretary to Prime Minister Khaleda Zia after being promoted. He was previously serving as her Private Secretary.

In June 2004, the Bangladesh Nationalist Party government placed Islam into compulsory retirement following allegations that he was involved in activities considered conspiratorial against the ruling administration. The government claimed an internal inquiry cited suspicions regarding his conduct and possible links to political unrest surrounding opposition movements at the time.

In June 2004, the Bureau of Anti-Corruption filed a case against Islam and three employees of the Prime Minister's Office under the Official Secrets Act, alleging that classified government information had been copied and removed without authorization. Investigators claimed that digital files and photocopied documents containing summaries of official matters were recovered during the inquiry. He denied the allegations, stating that he had not participated in any conspiracy against the government and that he was being targeted by vested interests. He also argued that storing files on compact discs was consistent with government efforts toward e-governance.

In February 2007, Islam gave an interview to The Daily Star in which he discussed corruption, the politicization of the administration, and decision-making within the government of former Prime Minister Khaleda Zia. Drawing on his experience in the Prime Minister's Office, he alleged that influential political figures and associates interfered in public administration, appointments, and procurement decisions during the period. In the same interview, he said that his compulsory retirement in 2004 followed disagreements over administrative procedures and his objections to decisions he considered improper. He further alleged that Tareque Rahman exercised informal influence over certain government matters during the Bangladesh Nationalist Party-led administration, particularly in relation to procurement decisions and complaints received by the Prime Minister's Office. He had also previously claimed that Arafat Rahman Koko, son of Prime Minister Khaleda Zia, lobbied for the approval of contracts, including the management of the Dhaka Inland Container Depot, and used political influence in state-related commercial decisions. He also brought allegations against Shamim Iskander, the brother of Prime Minister Khaleda Zia.

After the fall of the Sheikh Hasina-led Awami League government, Islam was appointed administrator of UDDIPAN, chairperson of Gas Transmission Company Limited and Eastern Lubricants Blenders Limited in 2024 and 2025.

In May 2009, the Bangladesh High Court declared Islam's compulsory retirement unlawful after he filed a writ petition. The court held that although the government may retire employees in the public interest, the order against Islam had been used to place him under undue pressure. The verdict was delivered by a bench comprising Justices A. B. M. Khairul Haque and Mohammad Mamtaj Uddin Ahmed.

In April 2025, Islam served as the administrator of UDDIPAN, a Bangladeshi non-governmental organization. In that capacity, he stated that the organization was preparing legal action against former chairman Mihir Kanti Majumder, brother of Banaj Kumar Majumder, over allegations of financial mismanagement, corruption, and embezzlement. He also said that relevant authorities, including the government and the Anti-Corruption Commission, had been informed of suspected irregularities and possible money laundering linked to the case. He was the chairperson of the Gas Transmission Company Limited.

The Bangladesh Nationalist Party government removed Islam from the post of chairperson at Eastern Lubricants Blenders Limited, a state-owned corporation.
