= Padma Oil Company =

Oil PLC, Bangladesh

Padma Oil Company Limited Bengali: পদ্মা অয়েল কোম্পানী লিমিটেড
- Company type: Registrar with joint stock company as a Public limited company under Company Act 1913
- Industry: Petroleum
- Predecessor: Burmah Oil Company
- Founded: April 27, 1965; 60 years ago
- Headquarters: Strand Road, Chittagong, Bangladesh
- Area served: National
- Products: Marketing of Petroleum product, Lubricant, Grease, Bitumen, Liquefied petroleum gas & Manufacturing & Marketing of Agrochemical
- Revenue: US$2.06 billion (2019)
- Number of employees: 1172 (2019)
- Parent: Bangladesh Petroleum Corporation
- Website: pocl.gov.bd

The Padma Oil Company Limited (Bengali: পদ্মা অয়েল কোম্পানী লিমিটেড) formerly known as Burmah Eastern Limited, is a subsidiary of Bangladesh Petroleum Corporation (BPC), a statutory organization of the government under the Ministry of Power, Energy, and Mineral Resources. It is registered with the joint-stock company as a public limited company under the Company Act 1913. The company's head office is located on Strand Road in Chittagong, officially known as Chattogram. It is one of three state owned oil distribution companies in Bangladesh with the others being Jamuna Oil Company and Meghna Petroleum Limited.

== History ==
Padma Oil Company Limited (POCL) is the largest and oldest oil company in Bangladesh, with its ancestor companies dating back to British-India's colonial period. Its ancestral enterprise, Burmah Oil Company, formerly Rangoon Oil Company in the British Empire, was established in the middle of the nineteenth century. In 1874, the Rangoon Oil Company was registered as a joint-stock company in Scotland. In 1885, the Rangoon Oil Company was reconstituted and reformed as Burmah Oil Company. Burmah Oil Company established its Maheshkhali oil installation plant at Chittagong in the year 1903. In 1914, Burmah Oil Company drilled a well at Sitakunda, Chittagong. Six years later, in the year 1920, M/s Bullock Brothers, a major distributor of Burmah Oil Company, established their trading office at Strand Road, Sadarghat, Chittagong, which was taken over by Burmah Oil Company in 1929 to become their main office.

Before the partition of the sub-continent in 1947, two oil marketing companies, Burmah Oil Company (BOC) and Burmah Shell Oil Storage and Distribution Company (BSOC), operated in Bangladesh. Burmah Shell established an aviation depot at Tejgaon Airport in the year 1948. In 1965, Burmah Shell transferred their share from BOC, and a new company called Burmah Eastern Limited was formed. After the Bangladesh Liberation War, Burmah Eastern Limited became a subsidiary of Bangladesh Petroleum Corporation (BPC) in 1977. In 1985, BOC transferred its entire property in Bangladesh (including Burmah Eastern Limited) in favor of BPC. As per terms of the transfer of BOC's whole share to BPC, Burmah Eastern Limited was required to change its name to Padma Oil Company Limited after the Padma River in 1988. Today, the company is one of the largest distributors of petroleum products in Bangladesh and is listed on the Dhaka Stock Exchange and the Chittagong Stock Exchange.

Eastern Lubricants Blenders Limited operates on land leased from Padma Oil Company and many of the staff are deputed from Padma Oil.

In April 2012, the Anti Corruption Commission sued three senior executives at the Padma Oil Company on charges of embezzlement from the company.

In July 2013, the Anti Corruption Commission sued the Managing Director of Padma Oil Company, Abul Khayer, and 91 other employees for illegally hiring staff at the company.

The Anti Corruption Commission arrested the former Managing Director of Padma Oil Company, Md Abul Khair, on allegations of embezzling 30 million taka from the company. The case was filed in April 2017 over embezzlement that took place in 1995-1996. In December 2017, Padma Oil Company announced it will not sell jet fuel to Bangladesh Biman, a state owned airlines, fuel on credit as it was owed 16 billion taka by Biman.

In 2020, Padma Oil declared 125 percent cash dividends on its shares. In November 2021, Padma Oil Limited sought money to construct a 12 storey liaison building at Paribagh, Shahbagh Thana, Dhaka. Energy and Mineral Resources Division increased the price of fuel in Bangladesh to pay for this and other projects, including the ongoing construction of a new headquarters in Chittagong and a jet fuel pipeline to the airport in Dhaka. The Consumer Association of Bangladesh deemed the project costly and unnecessary.

Padma Oil signed an agreement with Bashundhara LPG and Petromax LPG to sell their LPG in its gas stations. It has similar agreements with Beximco LPG Unit-1 and Energypac Power Generation Limited. In November 2021, a ship exploded at the depot of Padma Oil Company in Sugandha River in Jhalokati District killing one and injuring seven others. Five of the injured died in the hospital which raised the death toll to six. On 11 November 2021, Padma Oil increased the price of jet fuel for the 11th time in around 13 months.

== Operation and distribution ==
POCL has a vast depot network to ensure an adequate supply of fuels and agrochemicals throughout the country. The central installation of the company is situated at Gupthakhal, Patenga, and Chittagong. To ensure uninterrupted fuel supply, POCL has 17 oil depots (Godenail, Daulatpur, Bhaghabari, Chandpur, Parbatipur, Natore, Rajshahi Rail Siding, Jhalakati, Barisal Barge, Sylhet, Srimangal, Brahmanbaria, Ashuganj, Bhairab Bazar Barge, Rangpur, Kurmitola Aviation, and Chattogram Airport Depot) in and all over Bangladesh.

== See also ==
- Myanmar Oil and Gas Enterprise
- Meghna Petroleum Limited
