= East Coast Group =

Bangladeshi conglomerate

- Formation: 1977
- Headquarters: Dhaka, Bangladesh
- Official language: Bengali
- Website: www.ecg.com.bd

East Coast Group (Bengali: পূর্ব উপকূল গ্রুপ) is a Bangladeshi diversified conglomerate based in Dhaka. Azam J. Chowdhury is the chairperson of the company. In 2019, it had 30 subsidiaries and US$4 billion in assets. Tanjil Chowdhury, chairman of Prime Bank Limited, is the managing director of East Coast Group.

== History ==
East Coast Group started in 1977 as East Coast Trading Private Limited as an oil trading company. it was founded by Azam J Chowdhury. Chowdhury had also designed the logo of the company.

In 1980, East Coast Group founded Bangladesh Trade Syndicate Limited as a representative of TNT Express.

East Coast Group founded East Coast Shipping Lines Limited as their shipping wing in 1982.

East Coast Group founded EC Securities Limited in 1997 to invest in the stock market. In 1998, East Coast Group founded EC Distribution Limited.

East Coast Group founded Radiant Alliance Limited in October 2010. On 1 November 2010, East Coast Group founded Parkesine Products Limited. It announced plans to four container ships and one oil tanker ship.

East Coast Group founded ASP Crew Management 25 November 2011. Dilruba Chowdhury, director of East Coast Group, is the chairperson of Green Delta Insurance. MJL Bangladesh Limited opened a joint venture with AKT Petroleum Ltd in Myanmar, the first Bangladeshi joint venture in Myanmar.

In November 2015, East Coast Group founded EC Aviation Limited which operates FLY EC. It founded Omera Logistics Limited in December 2015.

In 2019, Azam J. Chowdhury was awarded businessman of the year by The Daily Star and DHL.

Its subsidiary, EC Organic Products Limited, launched halal olive oil products in Bangladesh. It purchased a second oil tanker for MJL Bangladesh Limited. It operates an offshore investment firm, MJL (S) PTE, in Singapore.

== Businesses ==
- East Coast Trading Private Limited
- East Coast Shipping Lines Limited
- EC Distribution Limited
- EC Securities Limited
- EC Bulk Carriers (operates MV OMERA I and MT OMERA QUEEN)
- EC Aviation Limited
- ASP Crew Management
- Bangladesh Trade Syndicate Limited
- MJL Bangladesh Limited
- Omera Fuels Limited
- Omera Petroleum Limited
- Omera Cylinders Limited manufactures natural gas cylinders in Bangladesh.
- Omera Logistics Limited
- CleanFuel Filling Station, filling station chain.
- Parkesine Products Limited
- Radiant Alliance Limited
- Nordic Woods Limited, a joint venture with Solor Treimpregnering A/S (55 percent) of Norway.
- Omera Renewable Energy
