= General Cargo Berth =

Port facility in Chittagong, Bangladesh

General Cargo Berth (GCB) is a port facility in the Port of Chittagong in Bangladesh. It is the port's oldest terminal. Despite not being a dedicated container terminal, in 2025 it handled about 36% of the port's total container traffic.

GCB is managed by the Chittagong Port Authority. It is the only terminal at the port used for both container vessels and bulk and break-bulk cargo. The terminal started off with six jetties in 1954 and six more were rebuilt in 1979. Six jetties handle container traffic, while the remaining six handle general cargo unloading and handling.

The jetties are operated by separate contractors under the tender-based contracts introduced in 2010, following a trial run that began in 2007.

In September 2026, six of the operators reported concerns about cargo distribution, reporting that the cargo volumes allocated to them were close to 40% below their indicative tender volumes. They questioned the allocation of container vessels among GCB, New Mooring Container Terminal (NCT) and Chattogram Container Terminal (CCT).
