= Meghna Petroleum Limited =

Bangladesh petroleum company

Meghna Petroleum PLC
- Formation: 27 December 1977
- Headquarters: Chittagong, Bangladesh
- Region served: Bangladesh
- Official language: Bengali
- Parent organization: Bangladesh Petroleum Corporation
- Website: mpl.gov.bd

Meghna Petroleum PLC is a Bangladesh petroleum company owned by Bangladesh Petroleum Corporation, a state owned corporation. Mir Saifullah-Al-Khaled is the managing director of Meghna Petroleum Limited. Md. Anisur Rahman, Senior Secretary at the Energy and Mineral Resources Division is the chairman of the Board of Directors of Meghna Petroleum PLC. It is one of three major petroleum corporations owned by the Government of Bangladesh along with Padma Oil Company and Jamuna Oil Company.

== History ==
Meghna Petroleum Limited was established on 27 December 1977 through the acquisition of the assess of Meghna Petroleum Marketing Company Limited and Padma Petroleum Limited. Meghna Petroleum Marketing Company Limited was created from the assets of ESSO Eastern Inc, which was established in 1962 and Padma Petroleum Limited was created from Dawood Petroleum Limited, which was established in 1968.

Meghna Petroleum was made a subsidiary of Bangladesh Petroleum Corporation.

In 1985, Meghna Petroleum became the only official distributor of BP lubricants in Bangladesh.

In 2004, Meghna Petroleum Limited commissioned a jetty, which was constructed by Gammon India Limited, in Chittagong.

Meghna Petroleum Limited was listed on the Dhaka Stock Exchange on 14 November and on the Chittagong Stock Exchange on 2 December 2007 and off loaded on 14 January 2008. It became the official distributor of Visco 3000 in Bangladesh.

In August 2019, Meghna Petroleum Limited signed an agreement with BM Energy (BD) Limited to sell their LPG at Meghna owned gas stations.

In September 2020, Meghna Petroleum Limited signed an agreement with Beximco LPG unit-1 Limited to sell their LPG at Meghna owned gas stations. It has similar agreements with Omera Gas One, Unitex LP Gas, and Bashundhara LP Gas. Meghna Petroleum Limited declared 150 percent cash dividend in December 2020. It had 13.45 billion taka in surplus funds.

Meghna Petroleum Limited was recognized as a top tax payer by the National Board of Revenue in February 2021. In September 2021, Meghna Petroleum Limited signed an agreement with Delta LPG Limited to sell Delta LPG at gas stations owned by Meghna Petroleum. Meghna donated 19.5 million taka to Bangladesh Labour Welfare Foundation in October 2021. A ship collided with the jetty of Meghna Petroleum and caused 160 million in damages. In November 2021, Meghna Petroleum Limited sought money to construct a 19-storey liaison building at Chittagong. Energy and Mineral Resources Division increased the price of fuel in Bangladesh to pay for this and other projects. The Consumer Association of Bangladesh deemed the project costly and unnecessary.

In January 2022, Institute of Cost and Management Accountants of Bangladesh awarded Meghna Petroleum Limited third prize in the Oil, Gas & Energy Category of the Best Corporate Award 2020.
