= Strand Road, Chittagong =

Important commercial road in Agrabad, Bangladesh

Coordinates: 22.3237199°N 91.8207136°E

Strand Road (Bengali: স্ট্র্যান্ড রোড) is an important commercial road in downtown Agrabad, Chattogram, Bangladesh. It is located alongside docks of the Port of Chattogram. The road was developed under British rule in the 19th century.

== See also ==
- Agrabad, the central business district of Chittagong located beside Strand Road
- O R Nizam Road
