= Bangladesh Petroleum Corporation =

Bangladesh government agency for petroleum and oil products

Bangladesh Petroleum Corp.
- বাংলাদেশ পেট্রোলিয়াম কর্পোরেশন
- Abbreviation: BPC
- Formation: 1976; 50 years ago
- Headquarters: Chittagong, Bangladesh
- Region served: Bangladesh
- Official language: Bengali
- Chairman (Secretary to Government): Amin Ul Ahsan
- Parent organization: Energy and Mineral Resource Division, People's Republic of Government of Bangladesh
- Website: bpc.gov.bd

Bangladesh Petroleum Corporation (Bengali: বাংলাদেশ পেট্রোলিয়াম কর্পোরেশন) (BPC) is a government agency in Bangladesh to import, distribute and market oil and petroleum products. Amin-Ul-Ahsan is the chairperson of Bangladesh Petroleum Corporation.

== History ==
Founded in 1976 by Presidential Ordinance to import and distribute crude oil, fuel, lubricating oil, and petroleum products in Bangladesh. It is managed by the Ministry of Power, Energy and Mineral Resources.

Bangladesh Petroleum Corporation had an annual import level of as much as 29 million barrels as of 2009.

The 2017 Economic Survey found Bangladesh Petroleum Corporation to be the most profitable state-owned enterprises. It made more than 90 billion taka in the 2015-16 fiscal year. Bangladesh Petroleum Corporation decided not to sell oil to Biman Bangladesh, the state owned airlines, on credit for because the airlines outstanding due had crossed 16 billion taka in December 2017.

Bangladesh is setting sail on a transformative path to directly offload imported petroleum oil from deep-sea vessels. The objective of this ambitious undertaking is to elevate the country's energy management system, fostering economic efficiency, sustainability, and environmental consciousness. As a crucial part of this initiative, an impressive 120-kilometer pipeline has been established, linking the SPM (Single Point Mooring) project to the Eastern Refinery Limited (EFL), ensuring the efficient treatment of crude oil.

On 20 February 2018, Bangladesh Petroleum Corporation sought permission from the government to set the oil prices using a new formula that will automatically adjust the prices with the price on the international market. The company feared the low price on domestic market might lead to losses for the company and encourage the smuggling of oil in the border areas with India.

In 2020, the Government of Bangladesh changed the law to require state owned enterprises to deposit surplus or idle funds to the national treasury. Bangladesh Petroleum Corporation deposited 50 billion taka to the national treasury. Bangladesh Petroleum Corporation decided to use private oil tanks to store oil as its own tanks were near full capacity in 2020. This was the result of a 60 percent decline in sales following the lockdown during the COVID-19 pandemic in Bangladesh.

== Companies ==
- Eastern Refinery Limited
- Padma Oil Company Limited
- Jamuna Oil Company Limited
- Meghna Oil Company Limited
- Eastern Lubricants Blenders Limited
- Standard Asiatic Oil Company Limited
- LP Gas Limited
- Asphaltic Bitumen Plant
