= Eastern Refinery Limited =

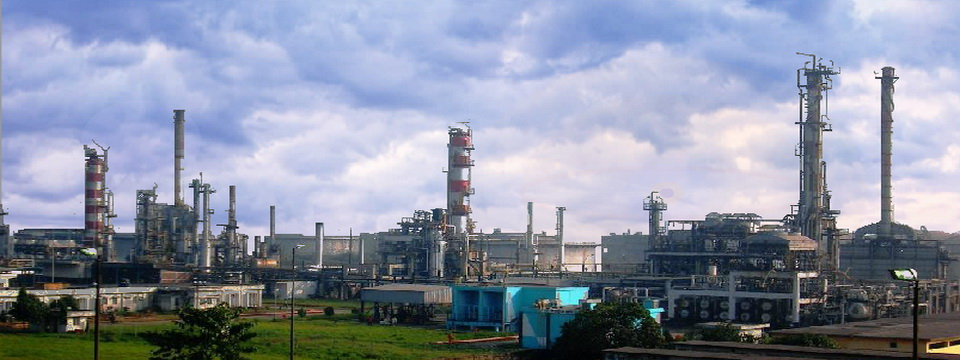
- Refinery overview
- Interactive map of the Eastern Refinery Limited area

General information
- Type: Oil refinery
- Location: North Patenga, Chittagong, Bangladesh
- Coordinates: 22.2672°N 91.8010°E
- Elevation: 12 m (39 ft)
- Completed: 1963
- Owner: Bangladesh Petroleum Corporation

Eastern Refinery Public Limited Company (ERPLC), is a state-owned oil refinery in Bangladesh. ERPLC, a subsidiary of Bangladesh Petroleum Corporation, supplies around 40% of the country's current petroleum products demand and thus maintains stability in the petroleum, oil, and lubricants (POL) products market of the country. ERPLC sometimes becomes the only fallback system available to avoid product crises in the face of disruption of products' imports.

ERPLC, as a profitable company in the public sector, contributes substantially to the national exchequer in the form of dividend, taxes, VAT etc.

== History ==
Eastern Refinery was incorporated under the Indian Companies Act 1913 as a public limited company in 1963 with 35% EPIDC's (East Pakistan Industrial Development Corporation) shares, 30% shares held by Burmah Oil Company and the rest 35% by private entrepreneurs. From November 1985, Bangladesh Petroleum Corporation (BPC) became the 100% share holder of the company.

== Refining facilities ==
Refinery first went on-stream with three processing units:

1. Crude distillation Unit
2. Catalytic reforming Unit
3. Hydrodesulfurization Unit

New process units added to the original configuration:

1. Asphaltic bitumen plant (Commissioned in December 1980)
2. Long residue visbreaker Unit (Commissioned in December 1994)
3. Hydrodesulfurization unit revamped to mild hydrocracking (MHC) unit, commissioned in December 1994);
4. MHC unit converted to NGC (Natural gas condensate) unit, commissioned in November 2007 by ERL engineers

== See also ==
- Supermajors
