= Jamuna Oil Company =

Jamuna Oil PLC (JOPLC)

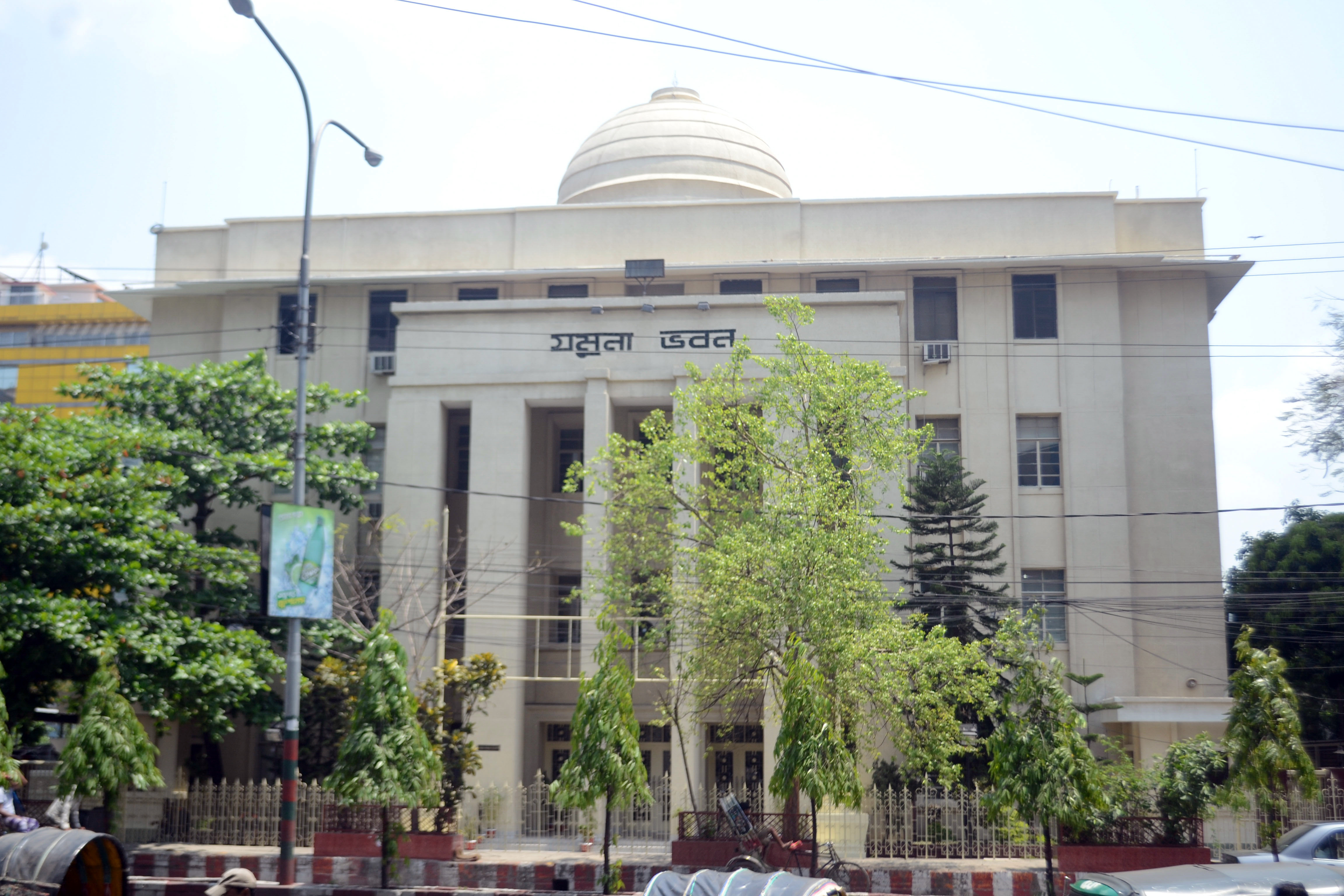
- Type: Public
- Traded as: DSE: JAMUNAOIL
- Industry: Petroleum
- Founded: 1964
- Headquarters: Chittagong, Bangladesh
- Area served: National
- Products: Oil; Petrol; Octane; Diesel; Kerosene
- Revenue: ▲BDT 489.4 million (2011)
- Operating income: ▲BDT 179.3 million (2011)
- Net income: ▲BDT 128.7 million (2011)
- Number of employees: 591 (2005)
- Website: jamunaoil.gov.bd

Jamuna Oil PLC (JOPLC) (estd. as Pakistan National Oil in 1964; renamed as Bangladesh National Oil in 1972) (DSE:JOCL) is a subsidiary of the Bangladesh Petroleum Corporation that nationally markets octane, petrol, diesel, kerosene, furnace oil, bitumen and lubricants in Bangladesh. In 1975, it was renamed Jamuna Oil Company (JOCL) after the river Jamuna. In accordance with Section 11(7) of the Companies Act, 1994 (Act No. 18), with the approval of the Registrar of Joint Stock Companies and Firms, the name of the company has been changed from “Jamuna Oil Company Limited (JOCL)” to “Jamuna Oil PLC. (JOPLC.)” with effect from 02 April 2026.

It is headquartered in Chittagong, Bangladesh.

== Organization and structure ==
Jamuna Oil is managed by a Board of Directors, a team of 8 executives, all of them are nominated by the Government of Bangladesh.

The board is responsible for over all decisions and top policy making body of the company. Managing Director, the Chief Executive of the company is appointed by Bangladesh Petroleum Corporation in addition to approval by the Government.
