= Yunus ministry =

Interim government of Bangladesh from 2024 to 2026

- 24th Council of Ministers and 9th Council of Advisers of the People's Republic of Bangladesh
- 8 August 2024 – 17 February 2026
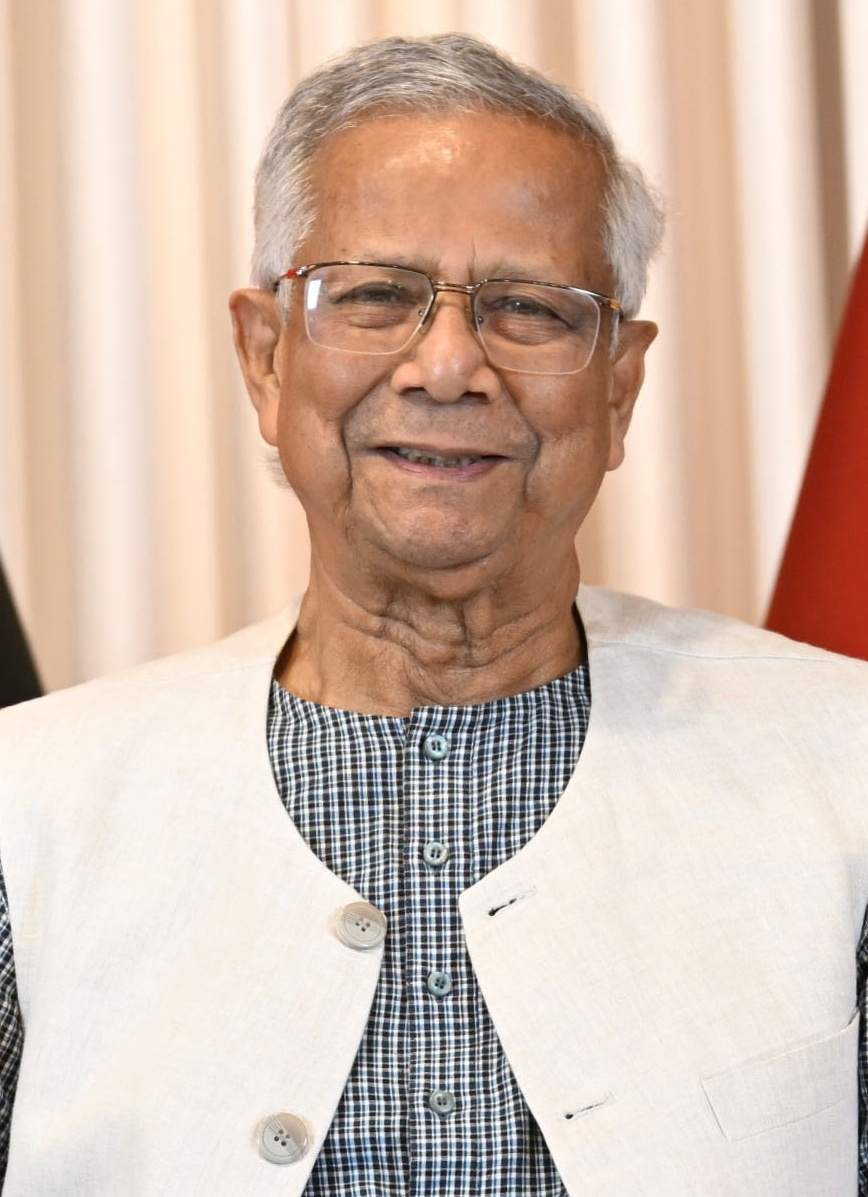
- Muhammad Yunus; Hon'ble Chief Adviser of Bangladesh
- Date formed: 8 August 2024
- Date dissolved: 17 February 2026

People and organisations
- President: Mohammed Shahabuddin
- Chief Adviser: Muhammad Yunus
- No. of ministers: 1 Chief Adviser; 20 Cabinet advisers 8 Special positions under the chief adviser's office 5 Special assistants under the Minister of State
- Total no. of members: 40 (including Chief Adviser)

History
- Outgoing election: 2026
- Legislature terms: 1 year, 193 days
- Budget: 2025 Budget
- Predecessor: Hasina V
- Successor: Tarique

An interim government led by Muhammad Yunus was formed on 8 August 2024 in Bangladesh, following the Resignation of Sheikh Hasina on 5 August 2024 amid nationwide protests against the government. Following the dissolution of the 12th Jatiya Sangsad on 6 August 2024, the interim cabinet was in office until a new Prime Minister was appointed after a snap general election. The government, like the previous non-caretaker government interim administrations (in 1975 and 1990), is extra-constitutional. However, Appellate Division, Supreme Court of Bangladesh affirmed the legality of the stopgap government on 9 August 2024, stating that the doctrine of necessity created an urgent need to manage state affairs and address the constitutional vacuum, similar to previous cases. The main pledge of his ministry was to forge consensus about and implement fundamental reforms that are required to hold a free and fair general election and constitutional referendum on the July Charter alongside the election on 12 February 2026.

President Mohammed Shahabuddin administered the oath of office to Yunus and his council of advisers at Bangabhaban on 8 August 2024. The cabinet consists of 1 Chief Adviser, 20 Advisers, 8 Special positions under the Chief Adviser's office and 5 Special assistants to the Chief Adviser under the Minister of State. The Jamuna State Guest House was served as the official residence of the Chief Adviser.

== Background ==
On 5 August 2024, Prime Minister of Bangladesh Sheikh Hasina resigned and went on an exile to India amidst a nationwide uprising. Initially focused on issues such as quota reforms, the movement gradually intensified following reports of violence and mass casualties. This was later referred to as the July Uprising, culminated in calls for Sheikh Hasina and her cabinet to step down. The movement was widely perceived as pro-democratic in nature.

Following her resignation, Chief of Army Staff General Waker-uz-Zaman and President Mohammed Shahabuddin announced the formation of an interim government. The president initiated discussions with political leaders across the country and dissolved the parliament on 6 August 2024. The Students Against Discrimination, lead organisation of the uprising, proposed economist and Nobel laureate Muhammad Yunus, who was then residing in Paris, to head the interim government. Yunus accepted the proposal, and the interim government was finalized on 7 August 2024.

== Dissolution ==
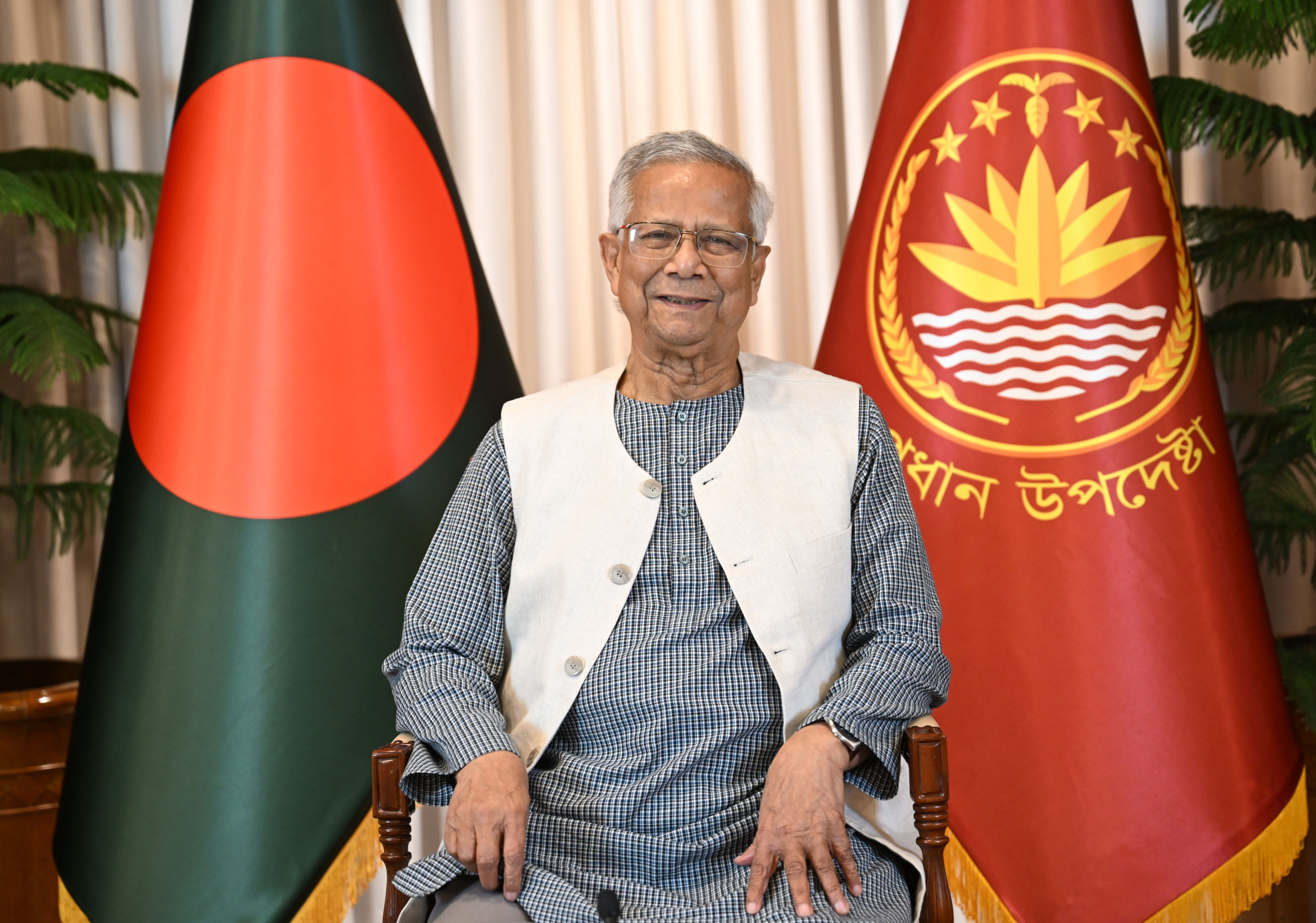
Muhammad Yunus giving his farewell speech as the Chief Advisor of Bangladesh on 16 February 2026.

On 17 February 2026, followed by the landslide victory of the Bangladesh Nationalist Party (BNP) lead alliance in the 12th national election, Tarique Rahman took oath as Prime Minister along with a new cabinet marking the end of the Interim government of Muhammad Yunus.

== Formation and timeline ==
=== 8 August 2024 ===
- Muhammad Yunus was appointed by the President Mohammed Shahabuddin as the Chief Adviser to the interim government of Bangladesh.
- 16 individuals were also appointed as advisers to the interim government by the President:
  1. Salehuddin Ahmed
  2. Asif Nazrul
  3. Adilur Rahman Khan
  4. A. F. Hassan Ariff
  5. Md. Touhid Hossain
  6. Rizwana Hasan
  7. Sharmeen Murshid
  8. Faruk-e-Azam
  9. M Sakhawat Hussain
  10. Supradip Chakma
  11. Bidhan Ranjan Roy Poddar
  12. A F M Khalid Hossain
  13. Farida Akhter
  14. Nurjahan Begum
  15. Nahid Islam
  16. Asif Mahmud
- Yunus was sworn in by the President at the Bangabhaban. Along with him, 13 of the 16 appointed advisers also took the oath, also administered by the President. It was announced that the remaining three advisers—Supradip Chakma, Bidhan Ranjan Roy, and Faruk-e-Azam would take their oaths at a later time. The oath ceremony was attended by national and international guests, including several ambassadors and the chiefs of the Bangladesh Armed Forces—the Chief of Army Staff, the Chief of Naval Staff, and the Chief of Air Staff. Senior political figures from various political parties (except the Awami League) were also present, alongside many other distinguished guests.

=== 9 August 2024 ===
- The distribution of ministries and divisions was made public. A total of 27 ministries and divisions were assigned to Chief Adviser Muhammad Yunus. One ministry was assigned to each of the other 13 advisers.

=== 11 August 2024 ===
- Supradip Chakma and Bidhan Ranjan Roy were sworn in as advisers by the President.
- Following their appointment, the responsibility for ministries and divisions was redistributed among Muhammad Yunus, Supradip Chakma and Bidhan Ranjan Roy. One ministry was allocated to each of the two advisers, resulting in 25 ministries and divisions being managed by the Chief Adviser.

=== 13 August 2024 ===
- Faruk-e-Azam, was sworn in as adviser.
- Following his appointment, a redistribution of ministries and divisions was carried out between Yunus and Faruk. Faruk was assigned a ministry, resulting in 24 ministries and divisions being managed by the Chief Adviser.
- Shafiqul Alam, a seasoned journalist and Bangladesh Bureau Chief of Agence France-Presse was appointed as Press Secretary to the Chief Adviser with status of a Secretary.

=== 14 August 2024 ===
- Lamiya Morshed, executive director of Yunus Centre and Grameen Healthcare Trust, was appointed as Principal Coordinator for Sustainable Development Goals (SDGs) Affairs with the status of a Senior Secretary.

=== 16 August 2024 ===
- Additional four Advisers—Wahiduddin Mahmud, Ali Imam Majumder, Muhammad Fouzul Kabir Khan, and Jahangir Alam Chowdhury were appointed by President Mohammed Shahabuddin and were sworn in on the same day.
- Following their appointment, a redistribution of ministries and divisions was carried out between the Chief Adviser and all the Advisers. A total of 10 ministries and divisions were taken charge of by the Chief Adviser. Responsibilities for one ministry each were assigned to many of the other advisers, while some advisers were assigned multiple ministries.
- Ali Imam Majumder was appointed as Special Assistant to the Chief Adviser, a role equivalent to an adviser. In the official document, his role is described as being "Attached to the Office of the Chief Adviser".

=== 22 August 2024 ===
- Abdul Hafiz was appointed as Special Assistant to the Chief Adviser on Defense and National Integration, a role equivalent to an adviser.

=== 27 August 2024 ===
- A redistribution of ministries and divisions was carried out between Chief Adviser and four other advisers, resulting in 6 ministries and divisions being managed by the Chief Adviser.

=== 28 August 2024 ===
- Mahfuj Alam, a Liaison Committee Coordinator of Students Against Discrimination was appointed as Special Assistant to the Chief Adviser with the status of a secretary.

=== 4 September 2024 ===
- Lutfey Siddiqi was appointed as Special Envoy on International Affairs, a role equivalent to an adviser.

=== 10 November 2024 ===
- Mahfuj Alam, Sheikh Bashir Uddin and Mostofa Sarwar Farooki were appointed and sworn in as Advisers by President Mohammed Shahabuddin at Bangabhaban.
- Following their appointment a redistribution of ministries and division was carried out, resulting in four ministries and divisions under the Chief Adviser.
- Former Inspector General of Police Khoda Baksh Chowdhury, Vice-Chancellor of Bangladesh Medical University Md Sayedur Rahman and M Aminul Islam were appointed as Special Assistant to the Interim government with the status of Minister of State. They were also given Executive Power over Ministry of Home Affairs, Ministry of Health and Family Welfare and Ministry of Education respectively.

=== 19 November 2024 ===
- Khalilur Rahman, a former UN official and current member of board of trustees of East West University was appointed as High Representative to the Chief Adviser on Rohingya Issues and Priority Affairs.

=== 21 November 2024 ===
- President Mohammed Shahabuddin, appointed AMM Nasir Uddin, a former Secretary as the Chief Election Commissioner and four other Election Commissioners.

=== 20 December 2024 ===
- Adviser A. F. Hassan Ariff dies while being in office.
- Ministry of Land and Ministry of Civil Aviation and Tourism, the two ministries under Adviser A. F. Hassan Ariff are shifted to Chief Adviser Muhammad Yunus.

=== 20 January 2025 ===
- Ali Imam Majumder was given the responsibility of Ministry of Land as additional duty.

=== 6 February 2025 ===
- Monir Haidar, a journalist was appointed as Special Assistant to the Chief Adviser on Consensus Building with the status equivalent to a Senior Secretary.

=== 17 February 2025 ===
- President Mohammed Shahabuddin amended Rules of Business to include Matters relating to July Mass Uprising under the Ministry of Liberation War Affairs.

=== 18 February 2025 ===
- Shafiqul Alam, Press Secretary to the Chief Adviser, got promoted to the status of Senior Secretary.

=== 25 February 2025 ===
- Nahid Islam resigned as Adviser to join new political party.
- Ministry of Information and Broadcasting and Ministry of Posts, Telecommunications and Information Technology, the two ministries under Adviser Nahid Islam are shifted to Chief Adviser Muhammad Yunus.

=== 26 February 2025 ===
- Mahfuj Alam was shifted from Special Assistant to the Chief Adviser, a role equivalent to an adviser to Adviser of Ministry of Information and Broadcasting.

=== 5 March 2025 ===
- Chowdhury Rafiqul Abrar was appointed and sworn in as Adviser by President Mohammed Shahabuddin at Bangabhaban.
- Chowdhury Rafiqul Abrar was assigned as Adviser of Ministry of Education, a ministry previously managed by Wahiduddin Mahmud.
- Sheikh Moin Uddin and Faiz Ahmad Taiyeb were appointed as Special Assistant with the status Minister of State of and were assigned to Ministry of Road Transport and Bridges and Ministry of Posts, Telecommunications and Information Technology respectively.

=== 10 March 2025 ===
- M Aminul Islam resigned as Special Assistant (with the status of Minister of State) for Ministry of Education.
- Anisuzzaman Chowdhury appointed as Special Assistant (with the status of Minister of State) for Ministry of Finance.

=== 7 April 2025 ===
- Ashik Chowdhury, Executive Chairman of Bangladesh Investment Development Authority and Bangladesh Economic Zones Authority was granted the status of Minister of State.

=== 9 April 2025 ===
- Khalilur Rahman, High Representative to the Chief Adviser on Rohingya Issue and Priority Matters was assigned as National Security Adviser and High Representative on Rohingya Issue.

=== 15 April 2025 ===
- Sheikh Bashir Uddin was assigned to the Ministry of Civil Aviation and Tourism.

=== 20 April 2025 ===
- Mohammad Sufiur Rahman appointed as Special Assistant (with the status of Minister of State) for Ministry of Foreign Affairs.

=== 14 July 2025 ===
- Sheikh Moin Uddin was given the responsibility of Ministry of Railways as additional duty.

=== 13 November 2025 ===
- Ali Riaz a political scientist and Head of Constitutional Reform Commission appointed as Special Assistant to the Chief Adviser, with the status equivalent to an Adviser.

=== 10 December 2025 ===
- Asif Mahmud and Mahfuj Alam resigns from the ministry.
- Ministry of Youth and Sports, Ministry of Local Government, Rural Development and Co-operatives and Ministry of Information and Broadcasting the three ministries under Adviser Asif Mahmud and Mahfuj Alam are shifted to Chief Adviser Muhammad Yunus.

=== 11 December 2025 ===
- A redistribution of ministries and divisions was carried out between Chief Adviser and three other advisers, resulting in 5 ministries and divisions being managed by the Chief Adviser.

=== 24 December 2025 ===
- Khoda Baksh Chowdhury resigned as Special Assistant (with the status of Minister of State) for Ministry of Home Affairs.

=== 30 December 2025 ===
- Md Sayedur Rahman, the Special Assistant for the Ministry of Health and Family Welfare resigns.

=== 1 January 2026 ===
- Md Sayedur Rahman, rejoins as Special Assistant for the Ministry of Health and Family Welfare.

=== 12 February 2026 ===
- 13th Parliamentary Election and National Referendum is held.

=== 13 February 2026 ===
- Election Commission publishes the results of the 13th Parliamentary Election in a Bangladesh Gazette. Bangladesh Nationalist Party wins 209 seats and moves to form the government. The results of the National Referendum are published in a separate gazette, with the “Yes” vote winning.

=== 16 February 2026 ===
- Muhammad Yunus addresses the nation for the last time as Chief Adviser of Bangladesh.

=== 17 February 2026 ===
- Tarique Rahman takes oath as the Prime Minister of Bangladesh marking the end of the Interim government led by Muhammad Yunus.

== Members ==
The following is the list of members of the interim government:

=== Final members ===
Role/Portfolio	Name	Date of Appointment	Date of Termination	Career Highlights
Head of Interim Government
Chief Adviser and also in-charge of: Chief Adviser's Office; Cabinet Division; Armed Forces Division; Ministry of Defence; Ministry of Posts, Telecommunications and Information Technology; Ministry of Public Administration	Muhammad Yunus	8 August 2024	17 February 2026	Founder of Grameen Bank; Pioneer of microcredit and microfinance; Nobel Peace Prize laureate (2006) for efforts to create economic and social development
Special Positions under the Chief Adviser's Office
Press Secretary to the Chief Adviser (Status equivalent to Senior Secretary)	Shafiqul Alam	13 August 2024	17 February 2026	Journalist; Bangladesh Bureau Chief, Agence France-Presse (AFP)
Principal Coordinator for Sustainable Development Goals (SDGs) Affairs (Status equivalent to Senior Secretary)	Lamiya Morshed	14 August 2024	17 February 2026	Executive Director, Yunus Centre and Grameen Healthcare Trust
Special Assistant to the Chief Adviser on Defence and National Solidarity Development (Status equivalent to an Adviser)	Abdul Hafiz	27 August 2024	17 February 2026	Retired Lieutenant general of Bangladesh Army
Special Envoy on International Affairs to the Chief Adviser (Status equivalent to an Adviser)	Lutfey Siddiqi	4 September 2024	17 February 2026	Professor in Practice, London School of Economics and Political Science; Adjunct Professor, National University of Singapore
National Security Adviser and High Representative to the Chief Adviser on Rohingya Issue (Status equivalent to an Adviser)	Khalilur Rahman	19 November 2024	17 February 2026	Former Head of Economic, Social and Development Affairs of Executive Office of the Secretary-General of the United Nations; Member, Board of Trustees, East West University
Special Assistant to the Chief Adviser on Consensus Building (Status equivalent to a Senior Secretary)	Monir Haidar	6 February 2025	17 February 2026	Journalist
Executive Chairman of Bangladesh Investment Development Authority, Bangladesh Economic Zones Authority and Moheshkhali Integrated Development Authority Chief Executive Officer, Public–Private Partnership Authority (Status equivalent to a Minister of State)	Ashik Chowdhury	7 April 2025	17 February 2026	Chartered Financial Analyst
Special Assistant to the Chief Adviser Chief Coordinator of Public Awareness Campaign on the 13th National Parliament Election and Referendum (Status equivalent to an Adviser)	Ali Riaz	13 November 2025	17 February 2026	Political scientist and Writer; Distinguished Professor, Department of Politics and Government, Illinois State University; Head of Constitutional Reform Commission; Vice Chairperson of National Consensus Commission
Advisers to the Interim Government
Ministry of Housing and Public Works; Ministry of Industries; Ministry of Local Government, Rural Development and Co-operatives	Adilur Rahman Khan	8 August 2024	17 February 2026	Former Deputy Attorney General of Bangladesh; Founder of Odhikar
Ministry of Expatriates Welfare and Overseas Employment; Ministry of Law, Justice and Parliamentary Affairs; Ministry of Youth and Sports	Asif Nazrul	8 August 2024	17 February 2026	Professor, Department of Law, University of Dhaka
Ministry of Religious Affairs	A F M Khalid Hossain	8 August 2024	17 February 2026	Professor & Naib-e-Ameer of Hefazat-e-Islam Bangladesh
Ministry of Fisheries and Livestock	Farida Akhter	8 August 2024	17 February 2026	Founding Executive of UBINIG
Ministry of Foreign Affairs	Md. Touhid Hossain	8 August 2024	17 February 2026	Former Foreign Secretary of Bangladesh
Ministry of Labour and Employment; Ministry of Shipping	M. Sakhawat Hussain	8 August 2024	17 February 2026	Retired Brigadier general of Bangladesh Army; Former Election Commissioner of Bangladesh
Ministry of Health and Family Welfare	Nurjahan Begum	8 August 2024	17 February 2026	Former Acting Managing Director of Grameen Bank
Ministry of Environment, Forest and Climate Change; Ministry of Information and Broadcasting; Ministry of Water Resources	Rizwana Hasan	8 August 2024	17 February 2026	Chief Executive, Bangladesh Environmental Lawyers Association
Ministry of Finance; Ministry of Science and Technology	Salehuddin Ahmed	8 August 2024	17 February 2026	Former Governor of Bangladesh Bank
Ministry of Social Welfare; Ministry of Women and Children Affairs	Sharmeen Murshid	8 August 2024	17 February 2026	Chief Executive Officer, Brotee
Ministry of Primary and Mass Education	Bidhan Ranjan Roy Poddar	11 August 2024	17 February 2026	Former Director-cum-Professor of National Institute of Mental Health and Hospital
Ministry of Chittagong Hill Tracts Affairs	Supradip Chakma	11 August 2024	17 February 2026	Chairman, Chittagong Hill Tracts Development Board
Ministry of Disaster Management and Relief; Ministry of Liberation War Affairs	Faruk-e-Azam	13 August 2024	17 February 2026	Bangladesh Liberation War veteran and Bir Protik awardee
Ministry of Food; Ministry of Land	Ali Imam Majumder	16 August 2024	17 February 2026	Former Cabinet Secretary
Ministry of Agriculture; Ministry of Home Affairs	Jahangir Alam Chowdhury	16 August 2024	17 February 2026	Retired Lieutenant general of Bangladesh Army; Former Director General of Border Guard Bangladesh
Ministry of Power, Energy and Mineral Resources; Ministry of Railways; Ministry of Road Transport and Bridges	Muhammad Fouzul Kabir Khan	16 August 2024	17 February 2026	Former Secretary of Power Division
Ministry of Planning	Wahiduddin Mahmud	16 August 2024	17 February 2026	Economist, Member of the United Nations Committee for Development Policy; Former Adviser in the 1996 Caretaker government
Ministry of Cultural Affairs	Mostofa Sarwar Farooki	10 November 2024	17 February 2026	Filmmaker
Ministry of Civil Aviation and Tourism; Ministry of Commerce; Ministry of Textiles and Jute	Sheikh Bashir Uddin	10 November 2024	17 February 2026	Managing Director, Akij-Bashir Group
Ministry of Education	Chowdhury Rafiqul Abrar	5 March 2025	17 February 2026	President, Odhikar; Former professor of Department of International Relations, University of Dhaka
Special Assistants to the Chief Adviser under the Minister of State
Ministry of Health and Family Welfare	Md Sayedur Rahman	10 November 2024	17 February 2026	Former Vice-Chancellor, Bangladesh Medical University
Ministry of Railways; Ministry of Road Transport and Bridges	Sheikh Moin Uddin	5 March 2025	17 February 2026	Civil Engineer
Ministry of Posts, Telecommunications and Information Technology	Faiz Ahmad Taiyeb	5 March 2025	17 February 2026	Telecommunication Engineer
Ministry of Finance	Anisuzzaman Chowdhury	10 March 2025	17 February 2026	Economist and Policy Analyst; Visiting professor, Western Sydney University
Ministry of Foreign Affairs	Mohammad Sufiur Rahman	20 April 2025	17 February 2026	Former Permanent Representative of Bangladesh to the United Nations Office in Geneva.; Former Ambassador of Bangladesh to Switzerland

=== Member who died in office ===
Name	Position	Date of Appointment in Interim Government	Portfolio	Date of Appointment	Date of Termination	Career Highlights
A. F. Hassan Ariff	Adviser	8 August 2024	Ministry of Local Government, Rural Development and Co-operatives	9 August 2024	10 November 2024	Former Attorney General of Bangladesh; Former Adviser in the 2007 Caretaker Government
A. F. Hassan Ariff	Adviser	8 August 2024	Ministry of Land	27 August 2024	20 December 2024	Former Attorney General of Bangladesh; Former Adviser in the 2007 Caretaker Government
A. F. Hassan Ariff	Adviser	8 August 2024	Ministry of Civil Aviation and Tourism	10 November 2024	20 December 2024	Former Attorney General of Bangladesh; Former Adviser in the 2007 Caretaker Government

=== Members who resigned ===
Name	Position	Status	Date of Appointment in Interim government	Portfolio	Date of Appointment	Date of Termination	Career Highlights	Reason
Nahid Islam	Adviser		8 August 2024	Ministry of Posts, Telecommunications and Information Technology	9 August 2024	25 February 2025	Key Coordinator of the Students Against Discrimination	To join National Citizen Party
Nahid Islam	Adviser		8 August 2024	Ministry of Information and Broadcasting	16 August 2024	25 February 2025	Key Coordinator of the Students Against Discrimination	To join National Citizen Party
M Aminul Islam	Special Assistant	Minister of State	10 November 2024	Ministry of Education	10 November 2024	10 March 2025	Former Vice-Chancellor of Shahjalal University of Science and Technology; Former Pro Vice-Chancellor of National University, Bangladesh; Former President of Federation of Bangladesh University Teacher's Association.	Unknown
Asif Mahmud	Adviser		8 August 2024	Ministry of Labour and Employment	16 August 2024	10 November 2024	Key Coordinator of the Students Against Discrimination	Unknown
Asif Mahmud	Adviser		8 August 2024	Ministry of Local Government, Rural Development and Co-operatives	10 November 2024	10 December 2025	Key Coordinator of the Students Against Discrimination	Unknown
Asif Mahmud	Adviser		8 August 2024	Ministry of Youth and Sports	9 August 2024	10 December 2025	Key Coordinator of the Students Against Discrimination	Unknown
Mahfuj Alam	Special Assistant to the Chief Adviser	Secretary (till 10 November 2024) Adviser (from 10 November 2024)	28 August 2024	N/A	28 August 2024	26 February 2025	Liaison Committee Coordinator of Students Against Discrimination	Unknown
Mahfuj Alam	Special Assistant to the Chief Adviser	Secretary (till 10 November 2024) Adviser (from 10 November 2024)	10 November 2024	N/A	28 August 2024	26 February 2025	Liaison Committee Coordinator of Students Against Discrimination	Unknown
Mahfuj Alam	Adviser		10 November 2024	Ministry of Information and Broadcasting	26 February 2025	10 December 2025	Liaison Committee Coordinator of Students Against Discrimination	Unknown
Khoda Baksh Chowdhury	Special Assistant	Minister of State	10 November 2024	Ministry of Home Affairs	10 November 2024	24 December 2025	Former Inspector General of Police, Bangladesh Police	Due to failing to control the deteriorating law and order situation.

== Ministry and Adviser / Special assistant Distribution ==
Portfolio	Adviser	Date of Appointment	Date of Termination
Armed Forces Division	Muhammad Yunus	9 August 2024	17 February 2026
Cabinet Division	Muhammad Yunus	9 August 2024	17 February 2026
Ministry of Agriculture	Muhammad Yunus	9 August 2024	16 August 2024
Ministry of Agriculture	Jahangir Alam Chowdhury	16 August 2024	17 February 2026
Ministry of Chittagong Hill Tracts Affairs	Muhammad Yunus	9 August 2024	11 August 2024
Ministry of Chittagong Hill Tracts Affairs	Supradip Chakma	11 August 2024	17 February 2026
Ministry of Civil Aviation and Tourism	Muhammad Yunus	9 August 2024	10 November 2024
Ministry of Civil Aviation and Tourism	A. F. Hassan Ariff	10 November 2024	20 December 2024 (Died in Office)
Ministry of Civil Aviation and Tourism	Muhammad Yunus	20 December 2024	15 April 2025
Ministry of Civil Aviation and Tourism	Sheikh Bashir Uddin	15 April 2025	17 February 2026
Ministry of Commerce	Muhammad Yunus	9 August 2024	16 August 2024
Ministry of Commerce	Salehuddin Ahmed	16 August 2024	10 November 2024
Ministry of Commerce	Sheikh Bashir Uddin	10 November 2024	17 February 2026
Ministry of Cultural Affairs	Muhammad Yunus	9 August 2024	16 August 2024
Ministry of Cultural Affairs	Asif Nazrul	16 August 2024	10 November 2024
Ministry of Cultural Affairs	Mostofa Sarwar Farooki	10 November 2024	17 February 2026
Ministry of Defence	Muhammad Yunus	9 August 2024	17 February 2026
Ministry of Disaster Management and Relief	Muhammad Yunus	9 August 2024	16 August 2024
Ministry of Disaster Management and Relief	Faruk-e-Azam	16 August 2024	17 February 2026
Ministry of Education	Muhammad Yunus	9 August 2024	16 August 2024
Ministry of Education	Wahiduddin Mahmud	16 August 2024	5 March 2025
Ministry of Education	Chowdhury Rafiqul Abrar	5 March 2025	17 February 2026
Ministry of Environment, Forest and Climate Change	Rizwana Hasan	9 August 2024	17 February 2026
Ministry of Expatriates Welfare and Overseas Employment	Muhammad Yunus	9 August 2024	16 August 2024
Ministry of Expatriates Welfare and Overseas Employment	Asif Nazrul	16 August 2024	17 February 2026
Ministry of Finance	Salehuddin Ahmed	9 August 2024	17 February 2026
Ministry of Fisheries and Livestock	Farida Akhter	9 August 2024	17 February 2026
Ministry of Food	Muhammad Yunus	9 August 2024	10 November 2024
Ministry of Food	Ali Imam Majumder	10 November 2024	17 February 2026
Ministry of Foreign Affairs	Md. Touhid Hossain	9 August 2024	17 February 2026
Ministry of Health and Family Welfare	Nurjahan Begum	9 August 2024	17 February 2026
Ministry of Home Affairs	M Sakhawat Hussain	9 August 2024	16 August 2024
Ministry of Home Affairs	Jahangir Alam Chowdhury	16 August 2024	17 February 2026
Ministry of Housing and Public Works	Muhammad Yunus	9 August 2024	16 August 2024
Ministry of Housing and Public Works	Adilur Rahman Khan	16 August 2024	17 February 2026
Ministry of Industries	Adilur Rahman Khan	9 August 2024	17 February 2026
Ministry of Information and Broadcasting	Muhammad Yunus	9 August 2024	16 August 2024
Ministry of Information and Broadcasting	Nahid Islam	16 August 2024	25 February 2025 (Resigned)
Ministry of Information and Broadcasting	Muhammad Yunus	25 February 2025	26 February 2025
Ministry of Information and Broadcasting	Mahfuj Alam	26 February 2025	10 December 2025 (Resigned)
Ministry of Information and Broadcasting	Muhammad Yunus	10 December 2025	11 December 2025
Ministry of Information and Broadcasting	Rizwana Hasan	11 December 2025	17 February 2026
Ministry of Labour & Employment	Muhammad Yunus	9 August 2024	16 August 2024
Ministry of Labour & Employment	Asif Mahmud	16 August 2024	10 November 2024
Ministry of Labour & Employment	M Sakhawat Hussain	10 November 2024	17 February 2026
Ministry of Land	Muhammad Yunus	9 August 2024	27 August 2024
Ministry of Land	A. F. Hassan Ariff	27 August 2024	20 December 2024 (Died in Office)
Ministry of Land	Muhammad Yunus	20 December 2024	20 January 2025
Ministry of Land	Ali Imam Majumder	20 January 2025	17 February 2026
Ministry of Law, Justice and Parliamentary Affairs	Asif Nazrul	9 August 2024	17 February 2026
Ministry of Liberation War Affairs	Muhammad Yunus	9 August 2024	13 August 2024
Ministry of Liberation War Affairs	Faruk-e-Azam	13 August 2024	17 February 2026
Ministry of Local Government, Rural Development and Co-operatives	A. F. Hassan Ariff	9 August 2024	10 November 2024
Ministry of Local Government, Rural Development and Co-operatives	Asif Mahmud	10 November 2024	10 December 2025 (Resigned)
Ministry of Local Government, Rural Development and Co-operatives	Muhammad Yunus	10 December 2025	11 December 2025
Ministry of Local Government, Rural Development and Co-operatives	Adilur Rahman Khan	11 December 2025	17 February 2026
Ministry of Planning	Salehuddin Ahmed	9 August 2024	16 August 2024
Ministry of Planning	Wahiduddin Mahmud	16 August 2024	17 February 2026
Ministry of Posts, Telecommunications and Information Technology	Nahid Islam	9 August 2024	25 February 2025 (Resigned)
Ministry of Posts, Telecommunications and Information Technology	Muhammad Yunus	25 February 2025	17 February 2026
Ministry of Power, Energy and Mineral Resources	Muhammad Yunus	9 August 2024	16 August 2024
Ministry of Power, Energy and Mineral Resources	Muhammad Fouzul Kabir Khan	16 August 2024	17 February 2026
Ministry of Primary and Mass Education	Muhammad Yunus	9 August 2024	11 August 2024
Ministry of Primary and Mass Education	Bidhan Ranjan Roy	11 August 2024	17 February 2026
Ministry of Public Administration	Muhammad Yunus	9 August 2024	17 February 2026
Ministry of Railways	Muhammad Yunus	9 August 2024	16 August 2024
Ministry of Railways	Muhammad Fouzul Kabir Khan	16 August 2024	17 February 2026
Ministry of Religious Affairs	A F M Khalid Hossain	9 August 2024	17 February 2026
Ministry of Road Transport and Bridges	Muhammad Yunus	9 August 2024	16 August 2024
Ministry of Road Transport and Bridges	Muhammad Fouzul Kabir Khan	16 August 2024	17 February 2026
Ministry of Science and Technology	Muhammad Yunus	9 August 2024	27 August 2024
Ministry of Science and Technology	Salehuddin Ahmed	27 August 2024	17 February 2026
Ministry of Shipping	Muhammad Yunus	9 August 2024	27 August 2024
Ministry of Shipping	M Sakhawat Hussain	27 August 2024	17 February 2026
Ministry of Social Welfare	Sharmeen Murshid	9 August 2024	17 February 2026
Ministry of Textiles and Jute	Muhammad Yunus	9 August 2024	16 August 2024
Ministry of Textiles and Jute	M Sakhawat Hussain	16 August 2024	10 November 2024
Ministry of Textiles and Jute	Sheikh Bashir Uddin	10 November 2024	17 February 2026
Ministry of Water Resources	Muhammad Yunus	9 August 2024	16 August 2024
Ministry of Water Resources	Rizwana Hasan	16 August 2024	17 February 2026
Ministry of Women and Children Affairs	Muhammad Yunus	9 August 2024	27 August 2024
Ministry of Women and Children Affairs	Sharmeen Murshid	27 August 2024	17 February 2026
Ministry of Youth and Sports	Asif Mahmud	9 August 2024	10 December 2025 (Resigned)
Ministry of Youth and Sports	Muhammad Yunus	10 December 2025	11 December 2025
Ministry of Youth and Sports	Asif Nazrul	11 December 2025	17 February 2026

=== Ministry and Special Assistant (with status of Minister of State) Distribution ===
Ministry	Special Assistant	Date of Appointment	Date of Termination
Ministry of Education	M Aminul Islam	10 November 2024	10 March 2025 (Resigned)
Ministry of Finance	Anisuzzaman Chowdhury	10 March 2025	17 February 2026
Ministry of Foreign Affairs	Mohammad Sufiur Rahman	20 April 2025	17 February 2026
Ministry of Health and Family Welfare	Md Sayedur Rahman	10 November 2024	30 December 2025 (Resigned)
Ministry of Health and Family Welfare	Md Sayedur Rahman	1 January 2026	17 February 2026
Ministry of Home Affairs	Khoda Baksh Chowdhury	10 November 2024	24 December 2025 (Resigned)
Ministry of Posts, Telecommunications and Information Technology	Faiz Ahmad Taiyeb	5 March 2025	17 February 2026
Ministry of Railways	Sheikh Moin Uddin	14 July 2025	17 February 2026
Ministry of Road Transport and Bridges	Sheikh Moin Uddin	5 March 2025	17 February 2026

== Reform commissions ==
The ministry has formed eleven reform commissions to reform perceived important areas of the government. The Head of Commission will have a status of a Justice of Appellate Division of the Supreme Court of Bangladesh.

The details of the head of commission and members are as follows.

Name	Position	Career Highlights
Public Administration Reform Commission
Abdul Muyeed Chowdhury	Head of Commission	Chairman, Biman Bangladesh Airlines Former Adviser of Latifur Rahman Caretaker Government
Mohammad Tareque	Member	Former Secretary
Muhammad Ayub Mia	Member	Former Secretary
Muhammad Mokhlesur Rahman	Member-Secretary	Senior Secretary, Ministry of Public Administration
Muhammad Hafizur Rahman	Member	Former Additional Secretary
Rezwan Khayer	Member	Former Additional Secretary
A. K. A. Firoz Ahmad	Member	Former Chairman, Department of Public Administration, University of Dhaka
Syeda Shahina Subhan	Member	Former Director of Centre for Medical Education
Firoz Ahmed	Member	Former Director General of Office of the Comptroller and Auditor General
Khandakar Mohammad Aminur Rahman	Member	Former Member of National Board of Revenue
Mehedi Hasan	Member	Student Representative, Jagannath University
Anti Corruption Commission Reform Commission
Iftekharuzzaman	Head of Commission	Executive Director, Transparency International Bangladesh
Ahmed Ataul Hakim	Member	Former Comptroller and Auditor General of Bangladesh
Mobasser Monem	Member	Professor, Department of Public Administration, University of Dhaka
Mushtaq Khan	Member	Professor, Department of Economics, SOAS University of London
Mahdin Chowdhury	Member	Bar-at-Law
Mahbubur Rahman	Member	Professor, Department of Law, University of Dhaka
Farzana Sharmin	Member	Advocate, Supreme Court of Bangladesh
Mubashshir Munim	Member	Student Representative, North South University
Judicial Reform Commission
Shah Abu Nayeem Mominur Rahman	Head of Commission	Former Justice, Appellate Division, Supreme Court of Bangladesh
Md. Emdadul Haque Azad	Member	Retired Justice, High Court Division, Supreme Court of Bangladesh Former District and Sessions Judge
Farid Ahmed Shibli	Member	Justice, High Court Division, Supreme Court of Bangladesh Former District and Sessions Judge
Sayed Aminul Islam	Member	Former District and Sessions Judge Former Registrar, Supreme Court of Bangladesh
Masdar Hossain	Member	Former District and Sessions Judge Plaintiff in the case of Masdar Hossain v. State
Tanim Hossain Shawon	Member	Barrister-at-law and Senior Advocate, Supreme Court of Bangladesh
Kazi Mahfuzul Haq Shupon	Member	Associate Professor, Department of Law, University of Dhaka
Arman Hossain	Member	Student Representative, University of Dhaka
Police Reform Commission
Safar Raj Hossain	Head of Commission	Former Secretary
Abu Momtaz Saad Uddin Ahmed	Member-Secretary	Additional Secretary, Public Security Division, Ministry of Home Affairs
Muhammad Iqbal	Member	Former Additional Secretary Former Director General, Department of Narcotics Control
Muhammad Harun Chowdhury	Member	Former Divisional Commissioner and Additional Secretary
Sheikh Md. Sajjad Ali	Member	Police Commissioner, Dhaka Metropolitan Police, Bangladesh Police Former Additional Inspector General of Bangladesh Police
Md. Rafiqul Hasan	Member	Joint Secretary (Drafting), Legislative & Parliamentary Affairs Division, Ministry of Law, Justice and Parliamentary Affairs
Md. Golam Rosul	Member	Deputy Inspector General of Bangladesh Police Chief of Special Branch, Bangladesh Police
Mohammad Ashfaqul Alam	Member	Deputy Inspector General of Bangladesh Police Commandant, Police Training Centre, Tangail
Shanaz Huda	Member	Professor, Department of Law, University of Dhaka
A. S. M. Nasiruddin Elan	Member	Human rights activist
Mohammad Jarif Rahman	Member	Researcher and Student Representative
Electoral System Reform Commission
Badiul Alam Majumdar	Head of Commission	Editor, Shushashoner Jonno Nagorik Election and Local Government Expert
Tofail Ahmed	Member	Former Professor and Chairman of Department of Public Administration, University of Chittagong Educator, Local Government and Election Expert
Jesmin Tuli	Member	Former Additional Secretary, Bangladesh Election Commission Electoral System, Voter Registration and National Identity Card Expert
Md. Abdul Alam	Member	Election Expert
Zahed Ur Rahman	Member	Political Expert and Opinion Maker
Mir Nadia Nivin	Member	Governance and Institutional Reform Expert
Muhammed Sadek Ferdous	Member	Electronic Voting and Blockchain Expert
Sadiq Al Arman	Member	Student Representative, East West University
Constitutional Reform Commission
Ali Riaz	Head of Commission	Political scientist and Writer
Sumaiya Khair	Member	Professor, Department of Law, University of Dhaka
Imran Siddique	Member	Bar-at-Law
Muhammad Ekramul Haque	Member	Professor, Department of Law, University of Dhaka
Sharif Bhuiyan	Member	Senior Advocate, Supreme Court of Bangladesh
M Moin Alam Firozi	Member	Bar-at-Law
Firoz Ahmed	Member	Writer
Md. Mostain Billah	Member	Writer and Human rights activist
Mahfuj Alam	Member	Student Representative (7 October 2024 - 10 November 2024)
Saleh Uddin Sifat	Member	Student Representative
Labor Reform Commission
Syed Sultan Uddin Ahmed	Head of Commission	Executive Director, Bangladesh Institute of Labour Studies
Mahfuzul Haq	Member	Former Secretary of Ministry of Labour and Employment and Ministry of Environment, Forest and Climate Change
Zakir Hossain	Member	Professor, Institute of Bangladesh Studies, University of Rajshahi
Tapan Dutta	Member	President, Chattogram Divisional Committee, Bangladesh Trade Union Centre
A. K. M. Nasir	Member	Advocate and Former President of Bangladesh Labour Court Bar Association
M Kamran T Rahman	Member	Former President of Bangladesh Employer's Federation
N/A	Member	Student Representative
Women's Affairs Reform Commission
Shirin Parvin Haque	Head of Commission	Founding Member, Naripokkho
Maheen Sultan	Member	Senior Fellow, BRAC Institute of Governance and Development
Sara Hossain	Member	Honorary Executive Director, Bangladesh Legal Aid and Services Trust
Fawzia Karim Firoze	Member	Senior Advocate, Supreme Court of Bangladesh and President, Foundation for Law & Development
Kalpona Akter	Member	President, Bangladesh Garment and Industrial Workers Federation
Halida Hanum Akhter	Member	Women Health Expert
Sumaiya Islam	Member	Executive Director, Bangladesh Nari Sramik Kendra
Nirupa Dewan	Member	Former Member, National Human Rights Commission of Bangladesh
Ferdousi Sultana	Member	Former Senior Social Development Adviser, Asian Development Bank
Nishita Jaman Niha	Member	Student Representative
Local Government Reform Commission
Tofail Ahmed	Head of Commission	Former Professor and Charman of Department of Public Administration, University of Chittagong Educator, Local Government and Election Expert
Ferdous Arfina Osman	Member	Professor, Department of Public Administration, University of Dhaka Former Chairman of Department of Public Administration, University of Dhaka
A. M. M. Nasir Uddin	Member	Former Secretary
Abdur Rahman	Member	Advocate, Supreme Court of Bangladesh
Mahfuz Kabir	Member	Director, BISS
Masuda Khan Shefali	Member	Executive Director, Nari Uddug Kendra
Md. Tarikul Islam	Member	Professor, Department of Government and Politics, Jahangirnagar University
N/A	Member	Student Representative
Mass Media Reform Commission
Kamal Ahmed	Head of Commission	Journalist
Gitiara Nasreen	Member	Professor, Department of Mass Communication and Journalism, University of Dhaka
Samsul Haque Jahid	Member	Editor, The Financial Express and Representative, Editor's Council
Aktar Hossain Khan	Member	Secretary, Newspaper Owners' Association of Bangladesh
	Member	Representative, Association of Television Channel Owners (ATCO)
Syed Abdal Ahmed	Member	Former General Secretary of Jatiya Press Club
Fahim Ahmed	Member	Chief Executive Officer, Jamuna Television and Trustee, Broadcast Journalist Center
Jimi Amir	Member	Journalist and Convenor, Media Support Network
Mustafa Sabuj	Member	Bogra District Representative, The Daily Star
Titu Dutta Gupta	Member	Deputy Editor, The Business Standard
Abdullah Al Mamun	Member	Student Representative
Health Sector Reform Commission
AK Azad Khan	Head of Commission	President, Diabetic Association of Bangladesh
Mohammad Zakir Hossain	Member	Professor, Department of Public Health and Informatics, Bangladesh Medical University
Liaquat Ali	Member	Chairman, Pothikrit Foundation
Saiba Aktar	Member	Gynecologist
Naila Zaman Khan	Member	Professor, Department of Pediatric Neuroscience, Dhaka Shishu Hospital
M. M. Reza	Member	Former Secretary
Mojaherul Haque	Member	Former Regional Adviser, South East Asia Region, World Health Organization
Ajharul Islam	Member	ICDDR,B
Syed Md Akram Hussain	Member	Senior Consultant Clinical Oncology & Radiotherapy, Square Cancer Centre, Square Hospital
Syed Atikul Haque	Member	Chief Consultant, Green Life Center for Rheumatic Care and Research
Ahmed Ehsanur Rahman	Member	Scientist, Department of Child and Maternal Health, ICDDR,B
Umayer Afif	Member	Student Representative

== Councils, committees, and commissions ==
The Interim government led by Muhammad Yunus formed several new councils, committees, and commissions, and reformed existing ones to manage various areas of the government. The councils, committees, and commissions consists of Chief Adviser, several advisers and government officials. The details about the committees are as follows.

Name	Role in Government	Position in Committee
Executive Committee of the National Economic Council
Muhammad Yunus	Chief Adviser	Chairperson
Salehuddin Ahmed	Adviser, Ministry of Finance and Ministry of Science and Technology	Alternate Chairperson
Wahiduddin Mahmud	Adviser, Ministry of Planning	Member
Asif Nazrul	Adviser, Ministry of Expatriates Welfare and Overseas Employment and Ministry of Law, Justice and Parliamentary Affairs	Member
Md. Touhid Hossain	Adviser, Ministry of Foreign Affairs	Member
Jahangir Alam Chowdhury	Adviser, Ministry of Agriculture and Ministry of Home Affairs	Member
Adilur Rahman Khan	Adviser, Ministry of Housing and Public Works and Ministry of Industries	Member
Ali Imam Majumder	Adviser, Ministry of Food and Ministry of Land	Member
Muhammad Fouzul Kabir Khan	Adviser, Ministry of Power, Energy and Mineral Resources, Ministry of Railways and Ministry of Road Transport and Bridges	Member
Rizwana Hasan	Adviser, Ministry of Environment, Forest and Climate Change and Ministry of Water Resources	Member
Mahfuj Alam	Adviser, Ministry of Information and Broadcasting	Member
Asif Mahmud	Adviser, Ministry of Local Government, Rural Development and Co-operatives and Ministry of Youth and Sports	Member
N/A	Advisor Of Concerned Ministry	Member
Advisory Council Committee on Financial Affairs
Salehuddin Ahmed	Adviser, Ministry of Finance and Ministry of Science and Technology	Convener
Wahiduddin Mahmud	Adviser, Ministry of Planning	Member
Asif Nazrul	Adviser, Ministry of Expatriates Welfare and Overseas Employment and Ministry of Law, Justice and Parliamentary Affairs	Member
Md. Touhid Hossain	Adviser, Ministry of Foreign Affairs	Member
Jahangir Alam Chowdhury	Adviser, Ministry of Agriculture and Ministry of Home Affairs	Member
Adilur Rahman Khan	Adviser, Ministry of Housing and Public Works and Ministry of Industries	Member
Ali Imam Majumder	Adviser, Ministry of Food and Ministry of Land	Member
Muhammad Fouzul Kabir Khan	Adviser, Ministry of Power, Energy and Mineral Resources, Ministry of Railways and Ministry of Road Transport and Bridges	Member
Rizwana Hasan	Adviser, Ministry of Environment, Forest and Climate Change and Ministry of Water Resources	Member
Mahfuj Alam	Adviser, Ministry of Information and Broadcasting	Member
N/A	Advisor Of Concerned Ministry	Member
Advisory Council Committee on Government Procurement
Salehuddin Ahmed	Adviser, Ministry of Finance and Ministry of Science and Technology	Convener
Wahiduddin Mahmud	Adviser, Ministry of Planning	Member
Asif Nazrul	Adviser, Ministry of Expatriates Welfare and Overseas Employment and Ministry of Law, Justice and Parliamentary Affairs	Member
Jahangir Alam Chowdhury	Adviser, Ministry of Agriculture and Ministry of Home Affairs	Member
Adilur Rahman Khan	Adviser, Ministry of Housing and Public Works and Ministry of Industries	Member
Ali Imam Majumder	Adviser, Ministry of Food and Ministry of Land	Member
Muhammad Fouzul Kabir Khan	Adviser, Ministry of Power, Energy and Mineral Resources, Ministry of Railways and Ministry of Road Transport and Bridges	Member
Rizwana Hasan	Adviser, Ministry of Environment, Forest and Climate Change and Ministry of Water Resources	Member
Asif Mahmud	Adviser, Ministry of Local Government, Rural Development and Co-operatives and Ministry of Youth and Sports	Member
Nurjahan Begum	Adviser, Ministry of Health and Family Welfare	Member
N/A	Advisor Of Concerned Ministry	Member
Advisory Council Committee on Law and Order
Jahangir Alam Chowdhury	Adviser, Ministry of Agriculture and Ministry of Home Affairs	Convener
Asif Nazrul	Adviser, Ministry of Expatriates Welfare and Overseas Employment and Ministry of Law, Justice and Parliamentary Affairs	Member
Adilur Rahman Khan	Adviser, Ministry of Housing and Public Works and Ministry of Industries	Member
Ali Imam Majumder	Adviser, Ministry of Food and Ministry of Land	Member
Muhammad Fouzul Kabir Khan	Adviser, Ministry of Power, Energy and Mineral Resources, Ministry of Railways and Ministry of Road Transport and Bridges	Member
Mahfuj Alam	Adviser, Ministry of Information and Broadcasting	Member
Asif Mahmud	Adviser, Ministry of Local Government, Rural Development and Co-operatives and Ministry of Youth and Sports	Member
Sharmeen Murshid	Adviser, Ministry of Social Welfare and Ministry of Women and Children Affairs	Member
A F M Khalid Hossain	Adviser, Ministry of Religious Affairs	Member
Supradip Chakma	Adviser, Ministry of Chittagong Hill Tracts Affairs	Member
N/A	Advisor Of Concerned Ministry	Member
Advisory Council Committee for formulating the legal framework for the naming of Government funded State Institutions/Establishments
Asif Nazrul	Adviser, Ministry of Expatriates Welfare and Overseas Employment and Ministry of Law, Justice and Parliamentary Affairs	Convener
Adilur Rahman Khan	Adviser, Ministry of Housing and Public Works and Ministry of Industries	Member
Rizwana Hasan	Adviser, Ministry of Environment, Forest and Climate Change and Ministry of Water Resources	Member
Food Planning and Monitoring Committee
Salehuddin Ahmed	Adviser, Ministry of Finance and Ministry of Science and Technology	Chairperson
Jahangir Alam Chowdhury	Adviser, Ministry of Agriculture and Ministry of Home Affairs	Member
Adilur Rahman Khan	Adviser, Ministry of Housing and Public Works and Ministry of Industries	Member
Ali Imam Majumder	Adviser, Ministry of Food and Ministry of Land	Member
Asif Mahmud	Adviser, Ministry of Local Government, Rural Development and Co-operatives and Ministry of Youth and Sports	Member
Faruk-e-Azam	Adviser, Ministry of Disaster Management and Relief and Ministry of Liberation War Affairs	Member
Nurjahan Begum	Adviser, Ministry of Health and Family Welfare	Member
Farida Akhter	Adviser, Ministry of Fisheries and Livestock	Member
Sheikh Bashir Uddin	Adviser, Ministry of Commerce and Ministry of Textiles and Jute	Member
Sheikh Abdur Rashid	Cabinet Secretary	Member
Md. Tofazzul Hasan	Secretary, Ministry of Fisheries and Livestock	Member
Mumtaz Ahmed	Secretary, Ministry of Women and Children Affairs	Member
Md. Obaidur Rahman	Secretary, Ministry of Industries	Member
Aliya Akhter	Secretary, Statistics and Informatics Division	Member
Md. Mustafizur Rahman	Secretary, Ministry of Disaster Management and Relief	Member
Dr. Mohammad Emdadullah Mian	Secretary, Ministry of Agriculture	Member
Khairuzzaman Mozumder	Secretary, Finance Division	Member
Md Abdur Rahman Khan	Secretary, Internal Resources Division	Member
Md. Mussadul Hasan	Secretary, Ministry of Food	Member
Md. Saidur Rahman	Secretary, Health Services Division	Member
Md. Abul Hasnat Humayun Kabir	Director General, Food Planning and Monitoring Unit, Ministry of Food	Member Secretary
Advisory Council on National Safe Food Management
Ali Imam Majumder	Adviser, Ministry of Food and Ministry of Land	Chairperson
Sheikh Abdur Rashid	Cabinet Secretary	Member
Nasimul Gani	Secretary, Public Security Division	Member
Md. Saidur Rahman	Secretary, Health Services Division	Member
N/A	Secretary, Ministry of Public Administration	Member
Md. Obaidur Rahman	Secretary, Ministry of Industries	Member
N/A	Secretary, Ministry of Information and Broadcasting	Member
N/A	Secretary, Ministry of Science and Technology	Member
N/A	Secretary, Local Government Division	Member
N/A	Secretary, Ministry of Environment, Forest and Climate Change	Member
Mohammad Emdadullah Mian	Secretary, Ministry of Agriculture	Member
Khairuzzaman Mozumder	Secretary, Finance Division	Member
N/A	Secretary, Ministry of Commerce	Member
Md. Tofazzul Hasan	Secretary, Ministry of Fisheries and Livestock	Member
N/A	Secretary, Legislative and Parliamentary Affairs Division	Member
N/A	Chairman, Bangladesh Council of Scientific and Industrial Research	Member
N/A	Chairman, Bangladesh Atomic Energy Commission	Member
N/A	Chairman, Bangladesh Food Safety Authority	Member
N/A	Director General, Directorate General of Health Services	Member
Md. Abul Hasnat Humayun Kabir	Director General, Directorate General of Food	Member
N/A	Director General, Directorate of National Consumer Rights Protection	Member
N/A	Director General, Bangladesh Standards and Testing Institution	Member
N/A	Director General, Bangladesh Accreditation Board	Member
N/A	Director, Institute of Nutrition and Food Science, University of Dhaka	Member
N/A	Chairman, Department of Chemistry, University of Dhaka	Member
N/A	President, Federation of Bangladesh Chambers of Commerce & Industries	Member
N/A	City Corporation Mayor/Administrator	Member
N/A	Upazila Parishad Chairman/Administrator	Member
Md. Mussadul Hasan	Secretary, Ministry of Food	Member
National Economic Council
Muhammad Yunus	Chief Adviser	Chairperson
N/A	All Advisers of Interim Government	Member
Advisory Council Committee on Social Security Programs
Salehuddin Ahmed	Adviser, Ministry of Finance and Ministry of Science and Technology	Chairperson
Ali Imam Majumder	Adviser, Ministry of Food and Ministry of Land	Member
Asif Mahmud	Adviser, Ministry of Local Government, Rural Development and Co-operatives and Ministry of Youth and Sports	Member
Faruk-e-Azam	Adviser, Ministry of Disaster Management and Relief and Ministry of Liberation War Affairs	Member
Sharmeen Murshid	Adviser, Ministry of Social Welfare and Ministry of Women and Children Affairs	Member
National Council for Women and Child Development
Muhammad Yunus	Chief Adviser	Chairperson
Salehuddin Ahmed	Adviser, Ministry of Finance and Ministry of Science and Technology	Vice Chairperson
Sharmeen Murshid	Adviser, Ministry of Social Welfare and Ministry of Women and Children Affairs	Vice Chairperson
Sheikh Bashir Uddin	Adviser, Ministry of Commerce and Ministry of Textiles and Jute	Member
Wahiduddin Mahmud	Adviser, Ministry of Planning	Member
Asif Nazrul	Adviser, Ministry of Expatriates Welfare and Overseas Employment and Ministry of Law, Justice and Parliamentary Affairs	Member
Mostofa Sarwar Farooki	Adviser, Ministry of Cultural Affairs	Member
Asif Mahmud	Adviser, Ministry of Local Government, Rural Development and Co-operatives and Ministry of Youth and Sports	Member
Jahangir Alam Chowdhury	Adviser, Ministry of Agriculture and Ministry of Home Affairs	Member
Rizwana Hasan	Adviser, Ministry of Environment, Forest and Climate Change and Ministry of Water Resources	Member
Mahfuj Alam	Adviser, Ministry of Information and Broadcasting	Member
Faruk-e-Azam	Adviser, Ministry of Disaster Management and Relief and Ministry of Liberation War Affairs	Member
Nurjahan Begum	Adviser, Ministry of Health and Family Welfare	Member
Bidhan Ranjan Roy	Adviser, Ministry of Primary and Mass Education	Member
Sheikh Abdur Rashid	Cabinet Secretary	Member
Md. Siraj Uddin Miah	Principal Secretary to Chief Adviser	Member
Siddiq Jobair	Secretary, Secondary and Higher Education Division	Member
Md. Saidur Rahman	Secretary, Health Services Division	Member
N/A	Secretary, Medical Education and Family Welfare Division	Member
N/A	Secretary, Ministry of Public Administration	Member
N/A	Secretary, Ministry of Information and Broadcasting	Member
N/A	Secretary, Local Government Division	Member
N/A	Secretary, Law and Justice Division	Member
N/A	Secretary, Ministry of Primary and Mass Education	Member
N/A	Secretary, Ministry of Youth and Sports	Member
N/A	Secretary, Finance Division	Member
N/A	Secretary, Ministry of Cultural Affairs	Member
Mumtaz Ahmed	Secretary, Ministry of Women and Children Affairs	Member
N/A	Secretary, Ministry of Social Welfare	Member
N/A	Secretary, Technical and Madrasah Education Division	Member
N/A	Member (Socio Economic Infrastructure Division), Bangladesh Planning Commission	Member
N/A	Secretary, Legislative and Parliamentary Affairs Division	Member
N/A	Member (Programming Division), Bangladesh Planning Commission	Member
N/A	Director General, Department of Women Affairs	Member
N/A	Chairman/Executive Director, Jatiyo Mohila Sangstha, Dhaka	Member
N/A	Chairperson, Bangladesh Shishu Academy	Member
National Committee to Prevent Child Marriage
Sharmeen Murshid	Adviser, Ministry of Social Welfare and Ministry of Women and Children Affairs	Chairperson
Siddiq Jobair	Secretary, Secondary and Higher Education Division	Member
Nasimul Gani	Secretary, Public Security Division	Member
Md. Saidur Rahman	Secretary, Health Services Division	Member
N/A	Secretary, Medical Education and Family Welfare Division	Member
N/A	Secretary, Ministry of Public Administration	Member
N/A	Secretary, Ministry of Information and Broadcasting	Member
N/A	Secretary, Local Government Division	Member
N/A	Secretary, Ministry of Religious Affairs	Member
N/A	Secretary, Law and Justice Division	Member
N/A	Secretary, Ministry of Primary and Mass Education	Member
N/A	Secretary, Ministry of Youth and Sports	Member
N/A	Secretary, Ministry of Cultural Affairs	Member
Mumtaz Ahmed	Secretary, Ministry of Women and Children Affairs	Member
N/A	Secretary, Ministry of Social Welfare	Member
N/A	Secretary, Technical and Madrasah Education Division	Member
N/A	Director General, Department of Women Affairs	Member
N/A	Chairman/Executive Director, Jatiyo Mohila Sangstha	Member
N/A	A representative of the rank of Additional Secretary/Joint Secretary nominated by the Cabinet Division	Member
N/A	Chairperson, Bangladesh Shishu Academy	Member
N/A	Secretary, National Human Rights Commission	Member
N/A	Chief Executive Officer, Dhaka South City Corporation	Member
N/A	Chief Executive Officer, Dhaka North City Corporation	Member
N/A	Country Director, UNICEF, Bangladesh	Member
N/A	One representative each of two Non-Governmental Organizations (NGOs) nominated by the Government, having activities at district and upazila level, one of whom shall be a woman, established to prevent child marriage or women and child rights	Member
N/A	Additional Secretary (Administration), Ministry of Women and Children Affairs	Member Secretary
National Committee on Hajj Management
Muhammad Yunus	Chief Adviser and Adviser, Ministry of Civil Aviation and Tourism	Chairperson
A F M Khalid Hossain	Adviser, Ministry of Religious Affairs	Member
Sheikh Abdur Rashid	Cabinet Secretary	Member
Md. Siraj Uddin Miah	Principal Secretary to Chief Adviser	Member
Md. Saidur Rahman	Secretary, Health Services Division	Member
Nasimul Gani	Secretary, Public Security Division	Member
N/A	Secretary, Ministry of Public Administration	Member
Nasimul Gani	Secretary, Security Service Division	Member
N/A	Secretary, Ministry of Religious Affairs	Member
Khairuzzaman Mozumder	Secretary, Finance Division	Member
N/A	Secretary, Ministry of Foreign Affairs	Member
N/A	Secretary, Ministry of Civil Aviation and Tourism	Member
N/A	Secretary, Ministry of Housing and Public Works	Member
N/A	Secretary, Ministry of Information and Broadcasting	Member
N/A	Director General, National Security Intelligence	Member
N/A	Chief Executive Officer, Dhaka North City Corporation	Member
N/A	Director, Hajj Office, Dhaka	Member
N/A	President, Hajj Agencies Association of Bangladesh	Member
N/A	Head of Hajj Department, Ministry of Religious Affairs	Member Secretary
Executive Committee on Hajj Management
A F M Khalid Hossain	Adviser, Ministry of Religious Affairs	Chairperson
Md. Saidur Rahman	Secretary, Health Services Division	Member
Nasimul Gani	Secretary, Public Security Division	Member
N/A	Secretary, Ministry of Public Administration	Member
Nasimul Gani	Secretary, Security Service Division	Member
N/A	Secretary, Ministry of Religious Affairs	Member
N/A	Secretary, Finance Division	Member
N/A	Secretary, Medical Education and Family Welfare Division	Member
N/A	Secretary, Ministry of Foreign Affairs	Member
N/A	Secretary, Ministry of Civil Aviation and Tourism	Member
N/A	Secretary, Ministry of Shipping	Member
N/A	Secretary, Ministry of Information and Broadcasting	Member
Baharul Alam	Inspector General of Bangladesh Police	Member
N/A	Representative, Cabinet Division	Member
N/A	Representative, Chief Adviser's Office	Member
N/A	Chairman, Civil Aviation Authority of Bangladesh	Member
N/A	All Head of Departments, Ministry of Religious Affairs	Member
N/A	Director General, Islamic Foundation Bangladesh	Member
N/A	Chief Executive Officer, Dhaka North City Corporation	Member
Abdul Muyeed Chowdhury	Managing Director and chief executive officer, Biman Bangladesh Airlines Ltd	Member
N/A	Director General, Department of Immigration & Passports	Member
N/A	Director, Hajj Office, Dhaka	Member
N/A	President, Hajj Agencies Association of Bangladesh	Member
N/A	Secretary General, Hajj Agencies Association of Bangladesh	Member
N/A	Head of Hajj Department, Ministry of Religious Affairs	Member Secretary
Advisory Council Committee on National Awards
Wahiduddin Mahmud	Adviser, Ministry of Planning	Convener
Salehuddin Ahmed	Adviser, Ministry of Finance and Ministry of Science and Technology	Member
Asif Nazrul	Adviser, Ministry of Expatriates Welfare and Overseas Employment and Ministry of Law, Justice and Parliamentary Affairs	Member
Adilur Rahman Khan	Adviser, Ministry of Housing and Public Works and Ministry of Industries	Member
Rizwana Hasan	Adviser, Ministry of Environment, Forest and Climate Change and Ministry of Water Resources	Member
Mahfuj Alam	Adviser, Ministry of Information and Broadcasting	Member
Faruk-e-Azam	Adviser, Ministry of Disaster Management and Relief and Ministry of Liberation War Affairs	Member
N/A	Advisor Of Concerned Ministry	Member
Advisory Council to ensure medical care for those injured in the Students Against Discrimination
Nurjahan Begum	Adviser, Ministry of Health and Family Welfare	Convener
Mahfuj Alam	Adviser, Ministry of Information and Broadcasting	Member
Asif Mahmud	Adviser, Ministry of Local Government, Rural Development and Co-operatives and Ministry of Youth and Sports	Member
Advisory Council Committee to investigate allegations of corruption related to appointment of Deputy Commissioner
Asif Nazrul	Adviser, Ministry of Expatriates Welfare and Overseas Employment and Ministry of Law, Justice and Parliamentary Affairs	Convener
Jahangir Alam Chowdhury	Adviser, Ministry of Agriculture and Ministry of Home Affairs	Member
Mahfuj Alam	Adviser, Ministry of Information and Broadcasting	Member
Bangladesh Planning Commission
Muhammad Yunus	Chief Adviser	Chairperson
Salehuddin Ahmed	Adviser, Ministry of Finance and Ministry of Science and Technology	Alternate Chairperson
Wahiduddin Mahmud	Adviser, Ministry of Planning	Vice Chairperson
N/A	Members of Bangladesh Planning Commission	Member
N/A	Secretary, Planning Division	Member Secretary
Advisory Council Committee on Review of Labor and Business Conditions of Industrial Establishments of BEXIMCO Industrial Park
M Sakhawat Hussain	Adviser, Ministry of Labour and Employment and Ministry of Shipping	Convener
Salehuddin Ahmed	Adviser, Ministry of Finance and Ministry of Science and Technology	Member
Jahangir Alam Chowdhury	Adviser, Ministry of Agriculture and Ministry of Home Affairs	Member
Adilur Rahman Khan	Adviser, Ministry of Housing and Public Works and Ministry of Industries	Member
Sheikh Bashir Uddin	Adviser, Ministry of Commerce and Ministry of Textiles and Jute	Member
Lutfey Siddiqi	Special Envoy on International Affairs	Member
National Committee on Security
Muhammad Yunus	Chief Adviser	Convener
Salehuddin Ahmed	Adviser, Ministry of Finance and Ministry of Science and Technology	Member
Asif Nazrul	Adviser, Ministry of Expatriates Welfare and Overseas Employment and Ministry of Law, Justice and Parliamentary Affairs	Member
Md. Touhid Hossain	Adviser, Ministry of Foreign Affairs	Member
Jahangir Alam Chowdhury	Adviser, Ministry of Agriculture and Ministry of Home Affairs	Member
Mahfuj Alam	Adviser, Ministry of Information and Broadcasting	Member
M Sakhawat Hussain	Adviser, Ministry of Labour and Employment and Ministry of Shipping	Member
Abdul Hafiz	Special Assistant to the Chief Adviser on Defense and National Integration	Member
Sheikh Abdur Rashid	Cabinet Secretary	Member
Waker-Uz-Zaman	Chief of Army Staff, Bangladesh Army	Member
Mohammad Nazmul Hassan	Chief of Naval Staff, Bangladesh Navy	Member
Hasan Mahmood Khan	Chief of Air Staff, Bangladesh Air Force	Member
Md. Siraj Uddin Miah	Principal Secretary to Chief Adviser	Member
Nasimul Gani	Secretary, Public Security Division	Member
N/A	Secretary, Ministry of Defence	Member
N/A	Secretary, Ministry of Foreign Affairs	Member
Smoking and Use of Tobacco Products Control Amendment Ordinance, 2024
Salehuddin Ahmed	Adviser, Ministry of Finance and Ministry of Science and Technology	Chairman
Asif Nazrul	Adviser, Ministry of Expatriates Welfare and Overseas Employment and Ministry of Law, Justice and Parliamentary Affairs	Member
Adilur Rahman Khan	Adviser, Ministry of Housing and Public Works and Ministry of Industries	Member
Muhammad Fouzul Kabir Khan	Adviser, Ministry of Power, Energy and Mineral Resources, Ministry of Railways and Ministry of Road Transport and Bridges	Member
Rizwana Hasan	Adviser, Ministry of Environment, Forest and Climate Change and Ministry of Water Resources	Member
Asif Mahmud	Adviser, Ministry of Local Government, Rural Development and Co-operatives and Ministry of Youth and Sports	Member
Nurjahan Begum	Adviser, Ministry of Health and Family Welfare	Member
Farida Akhter	Adviser, Ministry of Fisheries and Livestock	Member
Sheikh Bashir Uddin	Adviser, Ministry of Commerce and Ministry of Textiles and Jute	Member
National Advisory Council on Statistics
Wahiduddin Mahmud	Adviser, Ministry of Planning	Chairperson
Ahsan H. Mansur	Governor, Bangladesh Bank	Member
N/A	Member, General Economics Division, Bangladesh Planning Commission	Member
Aliya Akhter	Secretary, Statistics and Informatics Division	Member
Khairuzzaman Mozumder	Secretary, Finance Division	Member
N/A	Chairman, National Board of Revenue	Member
N/A	Secretary, Local Government Division	Member
N/A	Director General, Bangladesh Bureau of Statistics	Member
N/A	Director General, Department of Agricultural Extension	Member
N/A	Director General, National Institute of Population Research and Training	Member
N/A	Director General, Bangladesh Bureau of Educational Information and Statistics	Member
N/A	Director General, Bangladesh Institute of Development Studies	Member
N/A	President, Federation of Bangladesh Chambers of Commerce & Industries	Member
N/A	Chairman, Department of Statistics, University of Dhaka	Member
N/A	Chairman, Department of Finance, University of Dhaka	Member
N/A	Director, Institute of Statistical Research & Training, University of Dhaka	Member
N/A	Additional Secretary (Informatics), Statistics and Informatics Division	Member
Advisory Council Committee to monitor the implementation of the Detailed Area Plan prepared by the RAJUK to formulate recommendations for amendments where applicable
Ali Imam Majumder	Adviser, Ministry of Food and Ministry of Land	Convener
Asif Nazrul	Adviser, Ministry of Expatriates Welfare and Overseas Employment and Ministry of Law, Justice and Parliamentary Affairs	Member
Adilur Rahman Khan	Adviser, Ministry of Housing and Public Works and Ministry of Industries	Member
Muhammad Fouzul Kabir Khan	Adviser, Ministry of Power, Energy and Mineral Resources, Ministry of Railways and Ministry of Road Transport and Bridges	Member
Rizwana Hasan	Adviser, Ministry of Environment, Forest and Climate Change and Ministry of Water Resources	Member
Asif Mahmud	Adviser, Ministry of Local Government, Rural Development and Co-operatives and Ministry of Youth and Sports	Member
Investigation committee for the fire in Building No. 7 of the Bangladesh Secretariat on 26 December 2024
Nasimul Gani	Secretary, Ministry of Home Affairs	Convener
Baharul Alam	Inspector General of Bangladesh Police	Member
N/A	Secretary, Ministry of Housing and Public Works	Member
Tanvir Manzur	Professor, Department of Civil Engineering, Bangladesh University of Engineering and Technology	Member
Mahbubur Russel	Brigadier General, Bangladesh Army Commandant, Dhaka Cantonment	Member
Md. Yasir Arafat Khan	Associate Professor, Department of Chemical Engineering, Bangladesh University of Engineering and Technology	Member
Yasir Arafat	Associate Professor, Department of Electrical and Electronic Engineering, Bangladesh University of Engineering and Technology	Member
Muhammad Jahed Kamal	Director General, Bangladesh Fire Service & Civil Defence	Member Secretary
National Coordination and Advisory Committee on Fertilizers
Jahangir Alam Chowdhury	Adviser, Ministry of Agriculture and Ministry of Home Affairs	Convener
Adilur Rahman Khan	Advser, Ministry of Housing and Public Works and Ministry of Industries	Member
Md. Tofazzul Hasan	Secretary, Ministry of Fisheries and Livestock	Member
Md. Obaidur Rahman	Secretary, Ministry of Industries	Member
N/A	Secretary, Ministry of Environment, Forest and Climate Change	Member
N/A	Secretary, Ministry of Agriculture	Member
Khairuzzaman Mozumder	Secretary, Finance Division	Member
N/A	Secretary, Coordination & Reforms, Cabinet Division	Member
N/A	Chairman, Bangladesh Chemical Industries Corporation	Member
N/A	Chairman, Bangladesh Agricultural Development Corporation	Member
N/A	Director General, Department of Agricultural Extension	Member
N/A	Executive Director (Foreign Exchange Policy), Bangladesh Bank	Member
N/A	Chairman, Bangladesh Fertilizer Association	Member
N/A	Student Representative (nominated by the convener)	Member
N/A	Student Representative (nominated by the convener)	Member
National Committee on Environment and Climate Change
Muhammad Yunus	Chief Adviser	Convener
Salehuddin Ahmed	Adviser, Ministry of Finance and Ministry of Science and Technology	Member
Wahiduddin Mahmud	Adviser, Ministry of Planning	Member
Jahangir Alam Chowdhury	Adviser, Ministry of Agriculture and Ministry of Home Affairs	Member
Ali Imam Majumder	Adviser, Ministry of Food and Ministry of Land	Member
Muhammad Fouzul Kabir Khan	Adviser, Ministry of Power, Energy and Mineral Resources, Ministry of Railways and Ministry of Road Transport and Bridges	Member
Rizwana Hasan	Adviser, Ministry of Environment, Forest and Climate Change and Ministry of Water Resources	Member
Adilur Rahman Khan	Adviser, Ministry of Housing and Public Works and Ministry of Industries	Member
Faruk-e-Azam	Adviser, Ministry of Disaster Management and Relief and Ministry of Liberation War Affairs	Member
M Sakhawat Hussain	Adviser, Ministry of Labour and Employment and Ministry of Shipping	Member
Nurjahan Begum	Adviser, Ministry of Health and Family Welfare	Member
Farida Akhter	Adviser, Ministry of Fisheries and Livestock	Member
Sheikh Abdur Rashid	Cabinet Secretary	Member
Md. Siraj Uddin Miah	Principal Secretary to Chief Adviser	Member
Md. Tofazzul Hasan	Secretary, Ministry of Fisheries and Livestock	Member
N/A	Secretary, Road Transport and Highways Division	Member
N/A	Secretary, Ministry of Land	Member
N/A	Secretary, Ministry of Shipping	Member
Md. Obaidur Rahman	Secretary, Ministry of Industries	Member
N/A	Secretary, Ministry of Water Resources	Member
N/A	Member, Socio Economic Infrastructure Division, Bangladesh Planning Commission	Member
N/A	Secretary, Ministry of Housing and Public Works	Member
N/A	Secretary, Power Division	Member
N/A	Member, Programming Division, Bangladesh Planning Commission	Member
Md. Saidur Rahman	Secretary, Health Services Division	Member
Lamiya Morshed	Principal Coordinator for Sustainable Development Goals Affairs	Member
N/A	Secretary, Local Government Division	Member
Ashik Chowdhury	Executive Chairman, Bangladesh Investment Development Authority and Bangladesh Economic Zones Authority	Member
N/A	Chief Conservator of Forests, Forest Department	Member
N/A	Director General, Department of Environment	Member
N/A	Chairman, Bangladesh Space Research and Remote Sensing Organization	Member
N/A	Chairman, National River Conservation Commission	Member
N/A	President, Federation of Bangladesh Chambers of Commerce & Industries	Member
N/A	Government nominated environmental and climate expert (nominated by the Ministry of Environment, Forests and Climate Change)	Member
N/A	Government nominated environmental and climate expert (nominated by the Ministry of Environment, Forests and Climate Change)	Member
N/A	Secretary, Ministry of Environment, Forest and Climate Change	Member
Executive Committee of the National Environment and Climate Change Committee
Rizwana Hasan	Adviser, Ministry of Environment, Forest and Climate Change and Ministry of Water Resources	Convener
Jahangir Alam Chowdhury	Adviser, Ministry of Agriculture and Ministry of Home Affairs	Member
Faruk-e-Azam	Adviser, Ministry of Disaster Management and Relief and Ministry of Liberation War Affairs	Member
M Sakhawat Hussain	Adviser, Ministry of Labour and Employment and Ministry of Shipping	Member
Md. Tofazzul Hasan	Secretary, Ministry of Fisheries and Livestock	Member
N/A	Secretary, Road Transport and Highways Division	Member
N/A	Secretary, Ministry of Land	Member
Md. Obaidur Rahman	Secretary, Ministry of Industries	Member
N/A	Member, General Economics Division, Bangladesh Planning Commission	Member
N/A	Secretary, Ministry of Environment, Forest and Climate Change	Member
N/A	Secretary, Ministry of Commerce	Member
N/A	Secretary, Ministry of Housing and Public Works	Member
N/A	Secretary, Power Division	Member
N/A	Secretary, Energy and Mineral Resources Division	Member
N/A	Secretary, Local Government Division	Member
Ashik Chowdhury	Executive Chairman, Bangladesh Investment Development Authority and Bangladesh Economic Zones Authority	Member
N/A	Chief Conservator of Forests, Forest Department	Member
N/A	Director General, Department of Environment	Member
N/A	Managing Director, Bangladesh Climate Change Trust	Member
N/A	Executive Director, Centre for Environmental and Geographic Information Services	Member
N/A	President, Federation of Bangladesh Chambers of Commerce & Industries	Member
N/A	A representative of civil society with expertise in environmental issues (nominated by the Ministry of Environment, Forests and Climate Change)	Member
N/A	A representative of civil society with expertise in climate change (nominated by the Ministry of Environment, Forests and Climate Change)	Member
N/A	Additional Secretary (Environment), Ministry of Environment, Forest and Climate Change	Member
Committee on Law and Order
Jahangir Alam Chowdhury	Adviser, Ministry of Agriculture and Ministry of Home Affairs	Chairperson
Asif Nazrul	Adviser, Ministry of Expatriates Welfare and Overseas Employment and Ministry of Law, Justice and Parliamentary Affairs	Member
Asif Mahmud	Adviser, Ministry of Local Government, Rural Development and Co-operatives and Ministry of Youth and Sports	Member
M Sakhawat Hussain	Adviser, Ministry of Labour and Employment and Ministry of Shipping	Member
Khoda Baksh Chowdhury	Special Assistant, Ministry of Home Affairs	Member
Nasimul Gani	Secretary, Ministry of Home Affairs	Member
Baharul Alam	Inspector General of Bangladesh Police	Member
Committee on Public Administration
Salehuddin Ahmed	Adviser, Ministry of Finance and Ministry of Science and Technology	Chairperson
Muhammad Fouzul Kabir Khan	Adviser, Ministry of Power, Energy and Mineral Resources, Ministry of Railways and Ministry of Road Transport and Bridges	Member
Rizwana Hasan	Adviser, Ministry of Environment, Forest and Climate Change and Ministry of Water Resources	Member
Mahfuj Alam	Adviser, Ministry of Information and Broadcasting	Member-Secretary
Sheikh Abdur Rashid	Cabinet Secretary	Member
N/A	Secretary, Ministry of Public Administration	Member
Committee on Foreign Affairs
Md. Touhid Hossain	Adviser, Ministry of Foreign Affairs	Chairperson
Adilur Rahman Khan	Adviser, Ministry of Housing and Public Works and Ministry of Industries	Member
Mahfuj Alam	Adviser, Ministry of Information and Broadcasting	Member-Secretary
Khalilur Rahman	High Representative to the Chief Adviser on Rohingya Issues and Priority Matters	Member
N/A	Foreign Secretary, Ministry of Foreign Affairs	Member
National Steering Committee of Rooppur Nuclear Power Plant Construction Project
Muhammad Yunus	Chief Adviser	Chairperson
Salehuddin Ahmed	Adviser, Ministry of Finance and Ministry of Science and Technology	Member
Wahiduddin Mahmud	Adviser, Ministry of Planning	Member
Md. Touhid Hossain	Adviser, Ministry of Foreign Affairs	Member
Muhammad Fouzul Kabir Khan	Adviser, Ministry of Power, Energy and Mineral Resources, Ministry of Railways and Ministry of Road Transport and Bridges	Member
Rizwana Hasan	Adviser, Ministry of Environment, Forest and Climate Change and Ministry of Water Resources	Member
M Sakhawat Hussain	Adviser, Ministry of Labour and Employment and Ministry of Shipping	Member
Sheikh Abdur Rashid	Cabinet Secretary	Member
Md. Siraj Uddin Miah	Principal Secretary to Chief Adviser	Member
Ahsan H. Mansur	Governor, Bangladesh Bank	Member
Nasimul Gani	Secretary, Public Security Division	Member
Khairuzzaman Mozumder	Secretary, Finance Division	Member
N/A	Secretary, Economic Relations Division	Member
N/A	Secretary, Ministry of Foreign Affairs	Member
N/A	Secretary, Power Division	Member
S. M. Kamrul Hassan	Principal Staff Officer, Armed Forces Division	Member
N/A	Chairman, Bangladesh Atomic Energy Regulatory Authority	Member
N/A	Chairman, Bangladesh Atomic Energy Commission	Member
N/A	Project Director, Construction of Rooppur Nuclear Power Plant Project	Member
N/A	Secretary, Ministry of Science and Technology	Member-Secretary
High-powered technical committee for Rooppur Nuclear Power Plant construction project
Salehuddin Ahmed	Adviser, Ministry of Finance and Ministry of Science and Technology	Chairperson
Md. Siraj Uddin Miah	Principal Secretary to Chief Adviser	Member
Nasimul Gani	Secretary, Public Security Division	Member
Nasimul Gani	Secretary, Security Service Division	Member
N/A	Secretary, Ministry of Shipping	Member
N/A	Secretary, Ministry of Science and Technology	Member
N/A	Secretary, Ministry of Environment, Forest and Climate Change	Member
N/A	Secretary, Ministry of Water Resources	Member
Khairuzzaman Mozumder	Secretary, Finance Division	Member
N/A	Secretary, Coordination & Reforms, Cabinet Division	Member
N/A	Secretary, Economic Relations Division	Member
N/A	Secretary, Ministry of Foreign Affairs	Member
N/A	Secretary, Power Division	Member
N/A	Secretary, Planning Division	Member
Ashik Chowdhury	Executive Chairman, Bangladesh Investment Development Authority and Bangladesh Economic Zones Authority	Member
N/A	Chairman, Bangladesh Atomic Energy Regulatory Authority	Member
N/A	Chairman, Department of Nuclear Engineering, University of Dhaka	Member
N/A	Representative, Bangladesh Bank	Member
N/A	Member (Physical Science), Bangladesh Atomic Energy Commission	Member
N/A	Member (Engineering), Bangladesh Atomic Energy Commission	Member
N/A	Member (Planning and Development), Bangladesh Atomic Energy Commission	Member
N/A	Project Director, Construction of Rooppur Nuclear Power Plant Project	Member
N/A	Chairman, Bangladesh Atomic Energy Commission	Member
National Committee on Coordination, Management and Law and Order for Forcibly Displaced Myanmar Citizens
Jahangir Alam Chowdhury	Adviser, Ministry of Agriculture and Ministry of Home Affairs	Convener
Md. Touhid Hossain	Adviser, Ministry of Foreign Affairs	Member
Faruk-e-Azam	Adviser, Ministry of Disaster Management and Relief and Ministry of Liberation War Affairs	Member
Sharmeen Murshid	Adviser, Ministry of Social Welfare and Ministry of Women and Children Affairs	Member
Khalilur Rahman	High Representative to the Chief Adviser on Rohingya Issues and Priority Matters	Member
Sheikh Abdur Rashid	Cabinet Secretary	Member
Md. Siraj Uddin Miah	Principal Secretary to Chief Adviser	Member
Nasimul Gani	Secretary, Public Security Division	Member
Nasimul Gani	Secretary, Security Service Division	Member
Md. Mustafizur Rahman	Secretary, Ministry of Disaster Management and Relief	Member
N/A	Secretary, Ministry of Foreign Affairs	Member
S. M. Kamrul Hassan	Principal Staff Officer, Armed Forces Division	Member
Baharul Alam	Inspector General of Police	Member
N/A	Director General, NGO Affairs Bureau	Member
N/A	Director General, National Security Intelligence	Member
N/A	Director General, Directorate General of Forces Intelligence	Member
N/A	Divisional Commissioner, Chattogram	Member
N/A	Refugee Relief and Repatriation Commissioner, Cox's Bazar	Member
National Training Council
Muhammad Yunus	Chief Adviser	Chairman
Salehuddin Ahmed	Adviser, Ministry of Finance and Ministry of Science and Technology	Member
Asif Nazrul	Adviser, Ministry of Expatriates Welfare and Overseas Employment and Ministry of Law, Justice and Parliamentary Affairs	Member
Md. Touhid Hossain	Adviser, Ministry of Foreign Affairs	Member
Nurjahan Begum	Adviser, Ministry of Health and Family Welfare	Member
Sheikh Abdur Rashid	Cabinet Secretary	Member
Md. Siraj Uddin Miah	Principal Secretary to Chief Adviser	Member
Ahsan H. Mansur	Governor, Bangladesh Bank	Member
Siddiq Jobair	Secretary, Secondary and Higher Education Division	Member
N/A	Executive Chairman, National Skills Development Authority	Member
N/A	Rector, Bangladesh Public Administration Training Centre	Member
N/A	Secretary, Medical Education and Family Welfare Division	Member
N/A	Secretary, Technical and Madrasah Education Division	Member
Niaz Ahmed Khan	Vice Chancellor, University of Dhaka	Member
N/A	Secretary, Ministry of Public Administration	Member
Central Bank Reserve Theft Review Committee
Asif Nazrul	Adviser, Ministry of Expatriates Welfare and Overseas Employment and Ministry of Law, Justice and Parliamentary Affairs	Chairperson
Muhammad Fouzul Kabir Khan	Adviser, Ministry of Power, Energy and Mineral Resources, Ministry of Railways and Ministry of Road Transport and Bridges	Member
Faiz Ahmad Taiyeb	Special Assistant, Ministry of Posts, Telecommunications and Information Technology	Member
Ahsan H. Mansur	Governor, Bangladesh Bank	Member
Ali Ashfaq	Director, Biman Bangladesh Airlines	Member
Md. Nazrul Huda	Chairman, Rupali Bank	Member
Committee for Review and Amendment of the National Export Trophy Policy-2022
Sheikh Bashir Uddin	Adviser, Ministry of Commerce, Ministry of Textiles and Jute and Ministry of Civil Aviation and Tourism	Convener
Asif Nazrul	Adviser, Ministry of Expatriates Welfare and Overseas Employment and Ministry of Law, Justice and Parliamentary Affairs	Member
Adilur Rahman Khan	Adviser, Ministry of Housing and Public Works and Ministry of Industries	Member
Sheikh Abdur Rashid	Cabinet Secretary, Cabinet Division	Member
N/A	Secretary, Ministry of Commerce	Member-Secretary
National Implementation Committee on Administrative Reorganization
Muhammad Yunus	Chief Adviser	Convener
Salehuddin Ahmed	Adviser, Ministry of Finance and Ministry of Science and Technology	Member
Asif Nazrul	Adviser, Ministry of Expatriates Welfare and Overseas Employment and Ministry of Law, Justice and Parliamentary Affairs	Member
Adilur Rahman Khan	Adviser, Ministry of Housing and Public Works and Ministry of Industries	Member
Jahangir Alam Chowdhury	Adviser, Ministry of Agriculture and Ministry of Home Affairs	Member
Muhammad Fouzul Kabir Khan	Adviser, Ministry of Power, Energy and Mineral Resources, Ministry of Railways and Ministry of Road Transport and Bridges	Member
Asif Mahmud	Adviser, Ministry of Local Government, Rural Development and Co-operatives and Ministry of Youth and Sports	Member
Ali Imam Majumder	Adviser, Ministry of Food and Ministry of Land	Member
N/A	Subject Relevant Adviser	Member
Sheikh Abdur Rashid	Cabinet Secretary, Cabinet Division	Member
Md. Siraj Uddin Miah	Principal Secretary to Chief Adviser	Member
Nasimul Gani	Secretary, Public Security Division	Member
N/A	Member (Secretary), Physical Infrastructure Division, Bangladesh Planning Commission	Member
N/A	Secretary, Ministry of Public Administration	Member
N/A	Secretary, Ministry of Land	Member
Khairuzzaman Mozumder	Secretary, Finance Division	Member
N/A	Secretary, Local Government Division	Member
N/A	Secretary, Legislative and Parliamentary Affairs Division	Member
N/A	Secretary, Law and Justice Division	Member
N/A	Secretary, Coordination and Reforms, Cabinet Division	Member
N/A	Secretary, Relevant Ministry/Division	Member
National Rural Development Steering Committee
Asif Mahmud	Adviser, Ministry of Local Government, Rural Development and Co-operatives and Ministry of Youth and Sports	Chairperson
Nasimul Gani	Secretary, Public Security Division	Member
Siddiq Jobair	Secretary, Secondary and Higher Education Division	Member
Mumtaz Ahmed	Secretary, Ministry of Women and Children Affairs	Member
N/A	Secretary, Ministry of Environment, Forest and Climate Change	Member
N/A	Secretary, Ministry of Agriculture	Member
Khairuzzaman Mozumder	Secretary, Finance Division	Member
N/A	Secretary, Ministry of Food	Member
N/A	Secretary, Local Government Division	Member
N/A	Secretary, Planning Division	Member
N/A	Secretary, Ministry of Social Welfare	Member
Md. Saidur Rahman	Secretary, Health Services Division	Member
N/A	Secretary, Ministry of Chittagong Hill Tracts Affairs	Member
N/A	Secretary, Ministry of Disaster Management and Relief	Member
Md. Tofazzul Hasan	Secretary, Ministry of Fisheries and Livestock	Member
N/A	Secretary, Rural Development and Co-operatives Division	Member
N/A	Secretary, Ministry of Youth and Sports	Member
N/A	Director General, NGO Affairs Bureau	Member
N/A	Registrar and Director General, Department of Cooperatives, Dhaka	Member
N/A	Director General, Bangladesh Rural Development Board	Member
N/A	Director General, Bangladesh Academy for Rural Development, Cumilla	Member
N/A	Director General, Rural Development Academy, Bogura (Rural Development Research Institute Representative)	Member
N/A	Director, Bangladesh Academy for Rural Development, Cumilla (Rural Development Research Institute Representative)	Member
Mohsin Ali	Executive Director, WAVE Foundation	Member
Runa Khan	Founder and executive director, Friendship	Member
National Rural Development Council
Muhammad Yunus	Chief Adviser	Chairperson
Salehuddin Ahmed	Adviser, Ministry of Finance and Ministry of Science and Technology	Vice Chairperson
Asif Mahmud	Adviser, Ministry of Local Government, Rural Development and Co-operatives and Ministry of Youth and Sports	Vice Chairperson
Jahangir Alam Chowdhury	Adviser, Ministry of Agriculture and Ministry of Home Affairs	Member
Adilur Rahman Khan	Adviser, Ministry of Housing and Public Works and Ministry of Industries	Member
Ali Imam Majumder	Adviser, Ministry of Food and Ministry of Land	Member
Rizwana Hasan	Adviser, Ministry of Environment, Forest and Climate Change and Ministry Water Resources	Member
Nurjahan Begum	Adviser, Ministry of Health and Family Welfare	Member
Farida Akhter	Adviser, Ministry of Fisheries and Livestock	Member
Sharmeen Murshid	Adviser, Ministry of Social Welfare and Ministry of Women and Children Affairs	Member
Supradip Chakma	Adviser, Ministry of Chittagong Hill Tracts Affairs	Member
Mahfuj Alam	Adviser, Ministry of Information and Broadcasting	Member
Chowdhury Rafiqul Abrar	Adviser, Ministry of Education	Member
Nasimul Gani	Secretary, Public Security Division	Member
Siddiq Jobair	Secretary, Secondary and Higher Education Division	Member
Mumtaz Ahmed	Secretary, Ministry of Women and Children Affairs	Member
Khairuzzaman Mozumder	Secretary, Finance Division	Member
N/A	Secretary, Financial Institutions Division	Member
N/A	Secretary, Ministry of Labour and Employment	Member
N/A	Secretary, Ministry of Food	Member
N/A	Secretary, Local Government Division	Member
N/A	Secretary, Planning Division	Member
N/A	Secretary, Rural Development and Co-operatives Division	Member
N/A	Registrar and Director General, Department of Cooperatives	Member
N/A	Director General, Bangladesh Rural Development Board	Member
N/A	Director, Bangladesh Academy for Rural Development, Cumilla	Member
N/A	Chairman, Palli Karma-Sahayak Foundation (PKSF) (Rural Development Researcher)	Member
Nurul Alam Masud	Chief Executive, Participatory Research & Action Network (PRAN) (NGO Representative)	Member
Md Shawkat Akbar	Retired Joint Secretary Adviser, PROTTASHA Bangladesh (Experienced Rural Development Expert)	Member
Committee to Ensure Proper Management of Qurbani-Related Matters
Sheikh Bashir Uddin	Adviser, Ministry of Commerce, Ministry of Textiles and Jute and Ministry of Civil Aviation and Tourism	Convener
Jahangir Alam Chowdhury	Adviser, Ministry of Agriculture and Ministry of Home Affairs	Member
Adilur Rahman Khan	Adviser, Ministry of Housing and Public Works and Ministry of Industries	Member
Muhammad Fouzul Kabir Khan	Adviser, Ministry of Power, Energy and Mineral Resources, Ministry of Railways and Ministry of Road Transport and Bridges	Member
Rizwana Hasan	Adviser, Ministry of Environment, Forest and Climate Change and Ministry Water Resources	Member
Asif Mahmud	Adviser, Ministry of Local Government, Rural Development and Co-operatives and Ministry of Youth and Sports	Member
Farida Akhter	Adviser, Ministry of Fisheries and Livestock	Member
A F M Khalid Hossain	Adviser, Ministry of Religious Affairs	Member
Mahfuj Alam	Adviser, Ministry of Information and Broadcasting	Member
Khoda Baksh Chowdhury	Special Assistant, Ministry of Home Affairs	Member
Ashik Chowdhury	Executive Chairman, Bangladesh Investment Development Authority and Bangladesh Economic Zones Authority	Member
Shafiqul Alam	Press Secretary to the Chief Adviser	Member
N/A	Secretary, Ministry of Industries	Member
N/A	Secretary, Ministry of Commerce	Member-Secretary
N/A	NGO Representative (selected by government)	Member
N/A	Religious Institution Representative (selected by government)	Member
N/A	Private Institution Representative (selected by government)	Member
Committee to provide recommendations for the appropriate use of Gene Bank facilities
Wahiduddin Mahmud	Adviser, Ministry of Planning	Convener
Salehuddin Ahmed	Adviser, Ministry of Finance and Ministry of Science and Technology	Member
Jahangir Alam Chowdhury	Adviser, Ministry of Agriculture and Ministry of Home Affairs	Member
Chowdhury Rafiqul Abrar	Adviser, Ministry of Education	Member
Rizwana Hasan	Adviser, Ministry of Environment, Forest and Climate Change and Ministry Water Resources	Member
Nurjahan Begum	Adviser, Ministry of Health and Family Welfare	Member
Farida Akhter	Adviser, Ministry of Fisheries and Livestock	Member
Committee to review the situation arising in the context of the 'Government Jobs (Amendment) Ordinance, 2025' and formulate well-thought-out recommendations as soon as possible in consultation with the agitating organizations
Asif Nazrul	Adviser, Ministry of Expatriates Welfare and Overseas Employment and Ministry of Law, Justice and Parliamentary Affairs	Convener
Muhammad Fouzul Kabir Khan	Adviser, Ministry of Power, Energy and Mineral Resources, Ministry of Railways and Ministry of Road Transport and Bridges	Member
Sheikh Abdur Rashid	Cabinet Secretary	Member
Advisory Council Committee on the Use and Recovery of Acquired, Unused, and Encroached Land
Ali Imam Majumder	Adviser, Ministry of Food and Ministry of Land	Convener
Adilur Rahman Khan	Adviser, Ministry of Housing and Public Works and Ministry of Industries	Member
Muhammad Fouzul Kabir Khan	Adviser, Ministry of Power, Energy and Mineral Resources, Ministry of Railways and Ministry of Road Transport and Bridges	Member
Committee to review the collection and use of surveillance technology
Faiz Ahmad Taiyeb	Special Assistant, Ministry of Posts, Telecommunications and Information Technology	Convener
Nasimul Gani	Senior Secretary, Ministry of Home Affairs	Member
S. M. Kamrul Hassan	Principal Staff Officer, Armed Forces Division	Member
Committee to examine the reasonableness of the professional demands of B.Sc. degree and Diploma holders in engineering profession and formulate recommendations
Muhammad Fouzul Kabir Khan	Adviser, Ministry of Power, Energy and Mineral Resources, Ministry of Railways and Ministry of Road Transport and Bridges	Chairperson
Adilur Rahman Khan	Adviser, Ministry of Housing and Public Works and Ministry of Industries	Member
Chowdhury Rafiqul Abrar	Adviser, Ministry of Education	Member
Rizwana Hasan	Adviser, Ministry of Environment, Forest and Climate Change and Ministry Water Resources	Member
Mohammad Rezaul Islam	Chairman, Institution of Engineers, Bangladesh	Member
Md. Kabir Hossain	Convener, Interim Central Convening Committee, Institution of Diploma Engineers, Bangladesh	Member
Tanvir Manjur	Chairman, Board of Accreditation for Engineering and Technical Education	Member
Kazi Mohammad Mozammel Hoque	Additional Secretary (Organization and Management), Ministry of Public Administration	Member
Investigation commission to probe the attack on Mr. Nurul Haque Nur, President of Gana Adhikar Parishad and former Vice President of Dhaka University Central Students' Union
Md. Ali Reza	Justice, High Court Division, Supreme Court of Bangladesh	Chairperson
Nasimul Gani	Senior Secretary, Ministry of Home Affairs	Member
S. M. Kamrul Hassan	Principal Staff Officer, Armed Forces Division	Member
Advisory Council Committee for the Implementation of the Governance Performance Monitoring System
Salehuddin Ahmed	Adviser, Ministry of Finance and Ministry of Science and Technology	Chairperson
Wahiduddin Mahmud	Adviser, Ministry of Planning	Member
Ali Imam Majumder	Adviser, Ministry of Food and Ministry of Land	Member
Advisory Council Committee related to the Ministry of Information and Broadcasting
Wahiduddin Mahmud	Adviser, Ministry of Planning	Chairperson
Adilur Rahman Khan	Adviser, Ministry of Housing and Public Works and Ministry of Industries	Member
Rizwana Hasan	Adviser, Ministry of Environment, Forest and Climate Change and Ministry Water Resources	Member
Mahfuj Alam	Adviser, Ministry of Information and Broadcasting	Member
Lutfey Siddiqi	Special Envoy on International Affairs	Member
Committee to make recommendations for the revision of the Bangladesh Labour (Amendment) Ordinance, 2025
M Sakhawat Hussain	Adviser, Ministry of Labour and Employment and Ministry of Shipping	Convener
Asif Nazrul	Adviser, Ministry of Expatriates Welfare and Overseas Employment, Ministry of Law, Justice and Parliamentary Affairs and Ministry of Youth and Sports	Member
Muhammad Fouzul Kabir Khan	Adviser, Ministry of Power, Energy and Mineral Resources, Ministry of Railways and Ministry of Road Transport and Bridges	Member
Farida Akhter	Adviser, Ministry of Fisheries and Livestock	Member
Sheikh Bashir Uddin	Adviser, Ministry of Civil Aviation and Tourism, Ministry of Commerce and Ministry of Textiles and Jute	Member

=== Election Commission ===
The ministry created a new Bangladesh Election Commission to conduct a snap election. The commission includes 1 Chief Election Commissioner and 4 Election Commissioners. The details are as follows:

Name	Position	Date of Appoinement	Date of Termination	Career Highlights
AMM Nasir Uddin	Chief Election Commissioner	21 November 2024	Currently in Office	Former Secretary
Md Anwarul Islam Sarker	Election Commissioner	21 November 2024	Currently in Office	Former Additional Secretary
Abdur Rahmanel Masud	Election Commissioner	21 November 2024	Currently in Office	Former District and Sessions Judge
Begum Tahmida Ahmed	Election Commissioner	21 November 2024	Currently in Office	Former Joint Secretary
Abul Fazal Muhammad Sanaullah	Election Commissioner	21 November 2024	Currently in Office	Retired Brigadier General of Bangladesh Army

=== Inquiry Commissions ===
The government created several investigation commissions to investigate on several incidents. Unlike the reform commissions these commissions are investigation commission.

Name	Position	Career Highlights
Enforced Disappearances
Moinul Islam Chowdhury	Chairperson	Retired Justice of High Court Division, Supreme Court of Bangladesh
Farid Ahmed Shibli	Member	Retired Additional Justice of High Court Division
Nur Khan Liton	Member	Human rights activist
Nabila Idris	Member	Research Fellow, BRAC Institute of Governance and Development, BRAC University
Sazzad Hossain	Member	Human rights activist
Re-investigation of BDR Mutiny
A. L. M. Fazlur Rahman	Chairperson	Retired Major general of Bangladesh Army and Former Director General of Border Guard Bangladesh
Jahangir Kabir Talukdar	Member	Retired Major general of Bangladesh Army
Md. Saidur Rahman	Member	Retired Brigadier General of Bangladesh Army and Bir Protik awardee
Munshi Alauddin Al Azad	Member	Former Joint Secretary
M. Akbar Ali	Member	Former Deputy Inspector General of Bangladesh Police
Md. Shariful Islam	Member	Associate Professor, Department of Political Science, University of Dhaka
Md Shahnawaz Khan Chandan	Member	Assistant Professor, Institute of Education and Research, Jagannath University
A. T. K. M. Iqbal	Member	Retired Major of Bangladesh Army
Investigation of the violence and other related incidents that occurred at a political party rally in Gopalganj district headquarters on 16 July 2025
Md Abu Tariq	Chairperson	Retired Justice of Supreme Court of Bangladesh and Mukti Bahini veteran
Khandakar Md. Mahbubur Rahman	Member	Additional Seretary, Ministry of Home Affairs
Md. Saiful Islam	Member	Additional Secretary (District and Sessions Judge), Law and Justice Division, Ministry of Law, Justice and Parliamentary Affairs
Shahidur Rahman Osmani	Member	Brigdier General and Commander, 21st Infantry Bridage, 55th Infantry Division, Jessore, Bangladesh Army
Sardar Nurul Amin	Member	Director (Additional Inspector General of Police), Central Police Hospital
Sazzad Siddiqui	Member	Associate Professor & Chairman (Acting), Department of Peace and Conflict Studies, University of Dhaka

=== National Consensus Commission ===
The ministry formed a National Consensus Commission to decide on the process of reforms suggested by the reform commissions with different political parties and stake holders.

Name	Position in Government	Position in Commission
Muhammad Yunus	Chief Adviser	Chairperson
Ali Riaz	Head of Commission, Constitutional Reform Commission	Vice Chairperson
Muhammad Ayub Mia	Member, Public Administration Reform Commission	Member
Safar Raj Hossain	Head of Commission, Police Reform Commission	Member
Badiul Alam Majumdar	Head of Commission, Electoral System Reform Commission	Member
Md. Emdadul Haque Azad	Member, Judicial Reform Commission	Member
Iftekharuzzaman	Head of Commission, Anti Corruption Commission Reform Commission	Member

== Constitutional legality ==
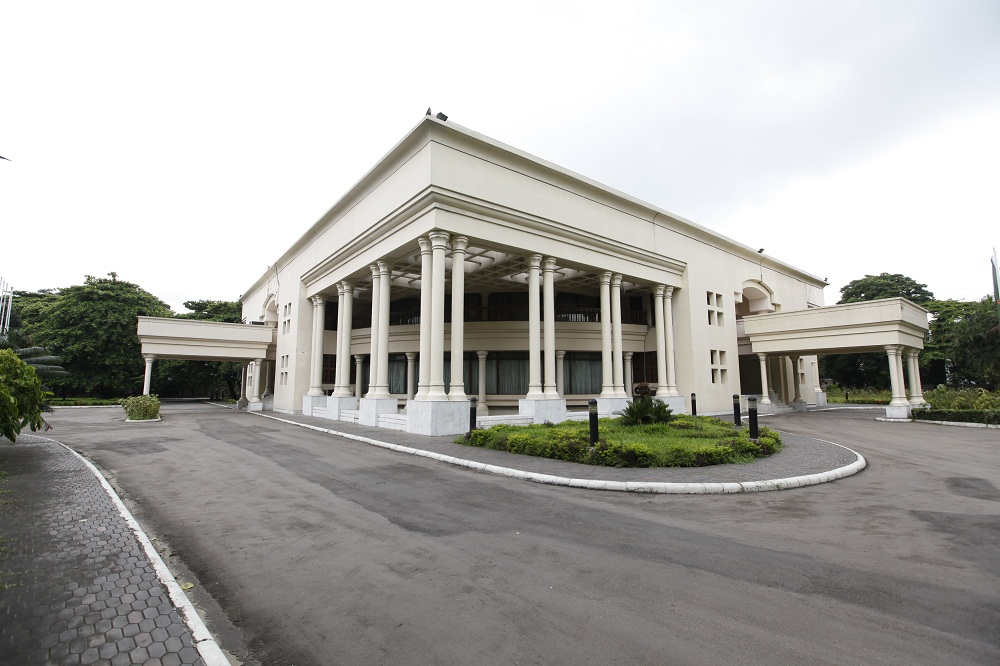
The Jamuna State Guest House is currently being used as the office and official residence of the Chief Adviser of the interim government.

In spite of the existence of interim administrations in the 1975–1978 (Sayem ministry) and 1990–1991 (Shahabuddin Ahmed ministry) periods of Bangladeshi political history, there were significant concerns regarding the legality of an interim government, considering that the Constitution of Bangladesh does not allow for it to exist. The Constitution also forbids ouster clauses, following the doctrine of basic constitutional structure.

The only form of interim government that has been constitutional in the past under the country's law was the Caretaker government system introduced in 1996 through the 13th Amendment but this was overturned by the Awami League regime in 2011 through the 15th Amendment, which repealed the former.

However, with Awami League President and former Prime Minister Sheikh Hasina resigning and fleeing the country amid protests, the Appellate Division of the Bangladeshi Supreme Court has acknowledged the legitimacy of the Yunus government under the doctrine of necessity. The court took the line that Hasina's resignation created a situation for which there was no constitutional remedy. Not only does the Bangladeshi legal system no longer account for transfers of power, but there was an urgent need to oversee state affairs. In essence, the court upheld what essentially amounts to the wording of the 13th Amendment prior to its suspension: "The Appellate Division opined that in accordance with Article 106 of the Constitution, an interim government can be formed with a chief advisor and a few other advisors in the absence of parliament" as per Chief Justice Obaidul Hassan. Hassan himself a staunch supporter of the ousted Awami League, has since resigned as Chief Justice.

Hence, despite the lack of constitutional legality for an interim government, due to extremely broad popular support and the need to ensure that a military junta takeover like in 1975 is prevented, Yunus was sworn in on the night of 8 August 2024. The Yunus government enjoys near-universal recognition from the international community, with many Head of state and Ministers of Foreign Affairs of other nations having congratulated Yunus upon his swearing-in.

On 17 November 2025, the Interim government sentenced Sheikh Hasina to death after being found guilty of committing various crimes against humanity. Hasina condemned the ruling as "biased and politically motivated" and alleged that "the death penalty is the interim government's way of nullifying her party the Awami League as a political force," in a five-page statement released after the verdict.

== Reactions ==
=== Internal ===
- The nomination of Yunus, who accepted an offer to advise the interim government, has been supported by key figures in the student movement. Students Against Discrimination coordinator Nahid Islam (who later became an adviser to the interim government) said on 6 August 2024,
  We have decided that an interim government would be formed, in which internationally renowned Nobel laureate Muhammad Yunus, who has wide acceptability, would be the chief adviser.
- Former Member of Parliament and business leader Abdul Kader Azad said in his response,
  The government formed under the leadership of Muhammad Yunus has the support of our businessmen. We hope that the collapsed law and order situation will be restored as soon as possible. All the students and people who were killed will be tried through a special investigation committee and a special court.
- Jatiya Samajtantrik Dal (Inu) president Hasanul Haq Inu and general secretary Shirin Akhter said in a statement:
  As the primary and main task of the Interim government, effective steps must be taken to restore normalcy and peace in public life by ensuring the safety of people's lives and property by re-establishing law and order in the country without delay. After the interim government assumes office, it will be ensured that not a single incident of loss of life, attack and destruction of property occurs in the country.
- Joint General Secretary of the Awami League Mahbubul Alam Hanif has congratulated the interim government, which has taken the oath of office after the ouster of the government led by the party, through a Facebook post. He also urged the government to take strict measures to stop killings, looting and arson attacks across the country.

=== International ===
==== Governments ====
- Minister of Foreign Affairs of Canada Mélanie Joly welcomed the inauguration of the interim government in Bangladesh led by Dr. Yunus.
- Lin Jian, spokesperson for the Ministry of Foreign Affairs of China said, "China has noted the establishment of an interim government of Bangladesh and welcomes this".
- Prime minister of India Narendra Modi congratulated Yunus after he was sworn in as a chief of the interim government. Modi said, "We hope for an early return to normalcy, ensuring the safety and protection of Hindus and all other minority communities". Leader of Opposition of India Rahul Gandhi & Chief Minister of West Bengal Mamata Banerjee also congratulated Yunus on being sworn in as the head of Bangladesh's interim government.
- A spokesperson for the South Korean Ministry of Foreign Affairs expressed hope to strengthen Bangladesh–South Korea relations with the interim government.
- (Japan) Japanese ambassador to Bangladesh, Naoki Ito, congratulated and extended their full support.
- Prime Minister of Malaysia Anwar Ibrahim congratulated Yunus on his appointment as Chief Adviser of the interim government of Bangladesh.
- President of Maldives Mohamed Muizzu congratulated Yunus on his appointment as the Chief Adviser of the interim government of the People's Republic of Bangladesh.
- President of Sri Lanka Ranil Wickremesinghe congratulates Yunus and his interim Government of Bangladesh.
- (Netherlands) The Dutch Ministry of Foreign Affairs welcomed the interim government of Dr. Yunus. Prime Minister Dick Schoof also congratulated Dr. Yunus, stating, "Our countries enjoy long-standing and cordial ties. I look forward to supporting your interim government and further deepening our cooperation."
- Prime minister of Pakistan Shehbaz Sharif wished Yunus great success in guiding Bangladesh towards a harmonious and prosperous future. He looks forward to working with him to deepen cooperation between Pakistan and Bangladesh. Many leaders of Opposition Party Pakistan Tehreek-e-Insaf also congratulates Interim government of Bangladesh.
- President of Turkiye Recep Tayyip Erdoğan congratulated Yunus. Erdoğan described Yunus as "a friend of Islam and Turkey", adding that "Turkey will continue to provide support in this turbulent time".
- Spokesperson for the United States Department of State Matthew Miller told reporters: "We welcome Dr. Yunus's call for an end to the recent violence and we stand ready to work with the interim government and Dr. Yunus as it charts a democratic future for the people of Bangladesh."
- President of France Emmanuel Macron congratulated Dr Yunus & extended full support.
- Prime Minister of the United Kingdom Keir Starmer welcomed the Interim Government of the Bangladesh and pledged support.

==== Organizations ====
- High Representative of the Union for Foreign Affairs and Security Policy Josep Borrell said, "The EU looks forward to engaging with the new administration and to supporting this critical transition which should be part of a peaceful and inclusive process underpinned by good governance, democratic values and respect for human rights".
- An alliance of 255 revolutionary groups and civil society organizations in Myanmar published an open letter congratulating the establishment of the interim government and appealed to Yunus to collaborate with and support the National Unity Government of Myanmar against the State Administration Council.

== See also ==
- Constitution of Bangladesh
- Elections in Bangladesh
- Government of Bangladesh
- July Uprising
- List of cabinets of Bangladesh
- Politics of Bangladesh
- Sayem ministry (interim 1975–78)
- Shahabuddin Ahmed ministry (interim 1990–91)
- Student politics of Bangladesh
