= Anisuzzaman Chowdhury =

Bangladeshi economist, policy analyst and Bangladeshi politician

- আনিসুজ্জামান চৌধুরী
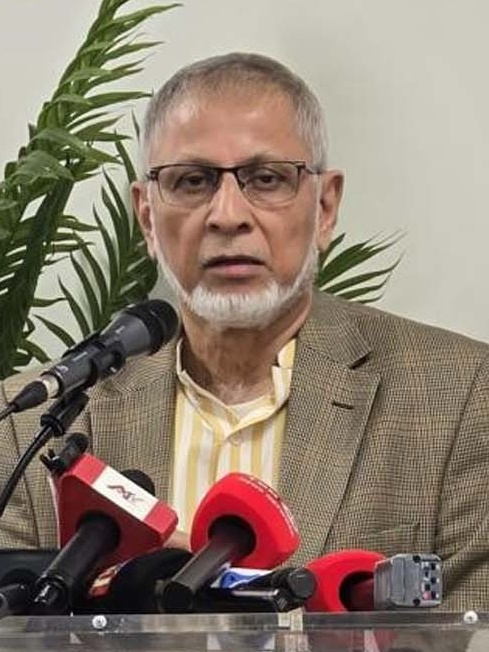
- Chowdhury in New York (2025)

Special Assistant to the Chief Adviser for Ministry of Finance
- In office 10 March 2025 – 17 February 2026
- Chief Adviser: Muhammad Yunus

Personal details
- Education: Jahangirnagar University; University of Manitoba
- Occupation: Economist, Policy Analyst

Anisuzzaman Chowdhury was born in 1954 in Chittagong, Bangladesh. He is a Bangladeshi economist and policy analyst who currently holds the title of Special Assistant to the Chief Adviser with the status of a Minister of State. He is currently in charge of the Ministry of Finance. He was serving as a visiting professor in Western Sydney University.

== Education ==
Chowdhury holds undergraduate and postgraduate degrees from Jahangirnagar University in Bangladesh and a PhD and an MA degree from the University of Manitoba, Canada.

== Career ==
Chowdhury has been teaching macroeconomic policy analysis and development studies at Western Sydney University in Australia for over two decades. He was awarded the title of emeritus professor at the university.

From 2008 to 2016, Chowdhury served in top positions at the United Nations in New York and Bangkok. He was a professor of economics at Western Sydney University from 2001 to 2012 and has also taught at the National University of Singapore, the University of New England, Australia and the University of Manitoba, Canada.

Chowdhury was the founding managing editor of the Journal of the Asia Pacific Economy from 1995 to 2008 and is currently a co-editor on its editorial board. Additionally, he is a member of the editorial board of The Economic and Labour Relations Review.

On 10 March 2025, Chowdhury was appointed as the special assistant (status equivalent to a Minister of State) to the chief adviser of the Interim government of Bangladesh.
