= Md. Shariful Islam =

Bangladeshi political scientist and academic

Md Shariful Islam is a Bangladeshi political scientist, academic, and professor of Political Science at the University of Dhaka. He is a former member of the Bangladesh Rifles Mutiny Commission of the interim government of Bangladesh led by Nobel laureate Muhammad Yunus.

== Early life and education ==
Islam completed his Master of Social Sciences in Political Science from the University of Dhaka and Master of Laws in Human Rights at the University of Hong Kong, where he was awarded the Sohmen Human Rights Scholarship. He undertook advanced study in religious pluralism and public life in the United States at the University of California, Santa Barbara , as a scholar with the United States Department of State. He was a fellow of the United States Department of State’s Democracy and American Political Process program in Washington, D.C.

== Career ==
Islam is a professor at the University of Dhaka in the Department of Political Science. He served as an International Scholar-in-Residence at Monmouth University in New Jersey, where he taught courses on global human rights and social justice. He was also a guest faculty member at Chonnam National University in Gwangju, South Korea, where he taught human rights and comparative politics.

In December 2024, Islam was appointed member of the National Independent Inquiry Commission on the Bangladesh Rifles revolt led by Major General (retired) ALM Fazlur Rahman. The position is status-equivalent to that of a judge of the High Court Division. The commission was constituted by the interim government of Bangladesh, led by Nobel laureate Muhammad Yunus, in December 2024. The commission was given three months to submit their findings. The commission report blamed the revolt on the Awami League and Prime Minister Sheikh Hasina.

In February 2026, Islam was appointed as commissioner of the National Human Rights Commission under chairperson Moyeenul Islam Chowdhury. Along with him, Md. Nur Khan, Ilira Dewan, and Nabila Idris were appointed commissioners.
