= M Aminul Islam =

Bangladeshi professor

- এম আমিনুল ইসলাম
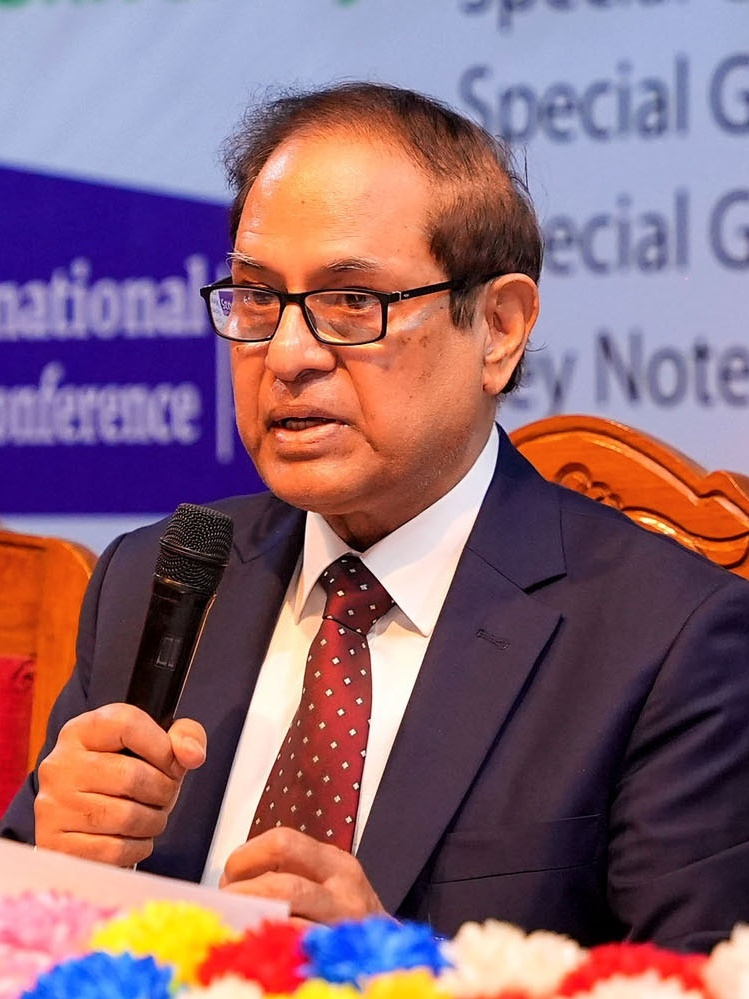
- Islam in Dhaka (2025)

Special Assistant to the Chief Adviser for Ministry of Education
- In office 10 November 2024 – 10 March 2025
- Chief Adviser: Muhammad Yunus

Vice-chancellor of Shahjalal University of Science and Technology
- In office October 2006 – February 2009
- Preceded by: Musleh Uddin Ahmed
- Succeeded by: Md Saleh Uddin

Personal details
- Education: University of Rajshahi; McMaster University (PhD)

M Aminul Islam is a Bangladeshi professor who has served as Special Assistant with the status equivalent to a Minister of State of the Interim government of Bangladesh. He was given executive power to assist the Adviser for the Ministry of Education. He previously served as the vice-chancellor of the Shahjalal University of Science and Technology from 2006 to 2009, pro-vice-chancellor at the National University from 2002 to 2006 and as president of the Federation of Bangladesh University Teacher's Association.

== Education ==
Islam has a bachelor's and master's degree in physics from the University of Rajshahi. He received a second master's degree and his Ph.D. in physics from McMaster University in Canada. His 1982 doctoral dissertation, Electric Quadrupole Radiation Strength in Neutron Capture, was supervised by William V. Prestwich.

== Career ==
On 10 November 2024, Islam was appointed as the special assistant (status equivalent to a Minister of State) to the chief adviser of the Interim government of Bangladesh.

Islam resigned on 10 March 2025 following a request from the office of chief advisor Muhammad Yunus.
