= Nurjahan Begum (banker) =

Bangladeshi banker

- নূরজাহান বেগম
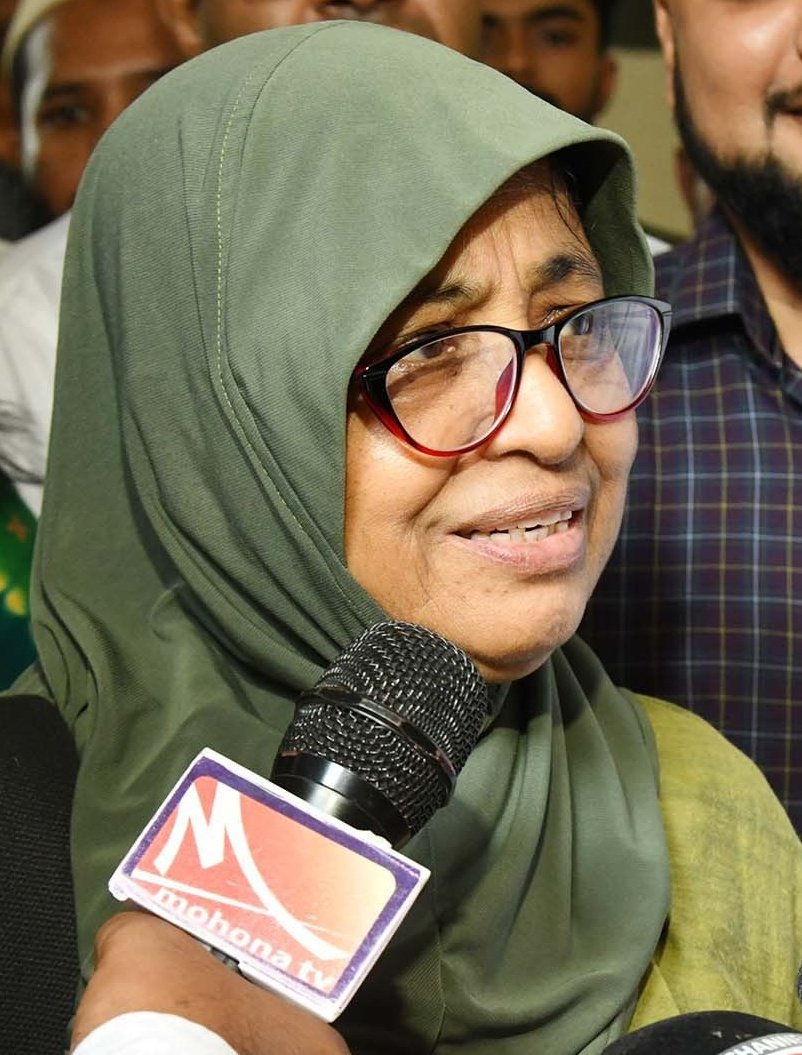
- Begum in 2025

Adviser for Health and Family Welfare
- In office 9 August 2024 – 17 February 2026
- President: Mohammed Shahabuddin
- Chief Adviser: Muhammad Yunus
- Preceded by: Samanta Lal Sen

Personal details
- Born: Hathazari, Chattogram
- Education: University of Chittagong (MA)

Nurjahan Begum is a Bangladeshi banker. She was an adviser in the Yunus ministry. She was the acting managing director of Grameen Bank in 2011 and general manager of three departments of Grameen Bank.

== Early life and education ==
Nurjahan Begum was born in Hathazari, Chattogram. She is a resident of Rouha village in the Suapur Union of Dhamrai Upazila, in Dhaka District.

She completed a master's degree in Bengali literature at the University of Chittagong before joining the Grameen project in October 1977. Her husband KM Ashaduzzaman is a former managing director of Social Islami Bank.

== Career ==
Begum served as the acting managing director of Grameen Bank after the bank's founder, Muhammad Yunus, left the bank in 2011. She worked as general manager of three departments of Grameen Bank: administration, training, and international program.

She is also the former president of Suapur Nannar School and College, Dhamrai. In 2007, she participated in the Fortune Most Powerful Women Summit in Los Angeles and chaired the Foundation for Justice Awards in Valencia, Spain.

== Criticism ==
In 2026, Bangladesh faced a major outbreak of Measles that led to multiple child deaths. Minister of Health and Family Welfare of the Tarique Rahman ministry attributed the crisis in part to declining immunisation coverage, delays in vaccine procurement, and disruptions in routine vaccination programmes during the tenure of Nurjahan Begum.

Later, an application was filed with the Anti-Corruption Commission by two lawyers of Supreme Court against Muhammad Yunus, Nurjahan Begum, and others, seeking an investigation into alleged embezzlement, irregularities, and corruption in the procurement of vaccines and syringes for children, including those for measles and other diseases.

== Awards ==
In 2008, she was awarded the Susan M. Davis Lifetime Achievement Award by the Grameen Foundation. She also received the World Summit Millennium Development Goals Award and the Vision Award in 2009.
