= Farid Ahmed Shibli =

Bangladeshi judge

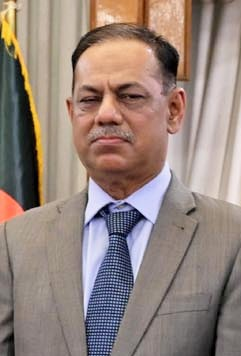
- Shibli in 2025

Justice of the High Court Division of Bangladesh

Personal details
- Profession: Judge

Farid Ahmed Shibli is a retired justice of the Bangladesh Supreme Court and member of the Justice Division Reform Commission.

== Career ==
Shibli and Justice Tariq ul Hakim expressed embarrassment to hear a petition in December 2015 challenging the legality of parliamentary membership of Nizam Uddin Hazari and sent the petition to the chief justice.

Shibli was appointed additional judge of the High Court Division in 2015 along with nine others.

The government of Bangladesh did not made Shibli a permanent judge of the High Court Division in February 2017 along with Justice JN Deb Chowdhury who had died. It made eight judges of the High Court Division permanent.

In August 2024 after the fall of the Sheikh Hasina led Awami League government, Shibli was appointed member of a commission looking into enforced disappearance led by Justice Moyeenul Islam Chowdhury. He was also made a member of the Justice Division Reform Commission led by Justice Shah Abu Naeem Mominur Rahman.
