= Public Security Division =

Division under Ministry of Home Affairs

- Bengali: জননিরাপত্তা বিভাগ
- Government Seal of Bangladesh

Division overview
- Formed: June 2016
- Dissolved: 2025
- Jurisdiction: Government of Bangladesh
- Headquarters: Bangladesh Secretariat, Agargaon, Dhaka
- Division executive: Senior Secretary
- Parent department: Ministry of Home Affairs
- Website: Public Security Division

Public Security Division was a Division of the Ministry of Home Affairs in Bangladesh. It was responsible for public security and oversaw the civilian security agencies of Bangladesh.

== History ==
Public Security Division is the part of the Ministry of Home Affairs which was established in 1971 by the Government of Bangladesh in exile during the Bangladesh Liberation war. In June 2016, the Government of Bangladesh divided the Ministry of Home Affairs into two Divisions, Public Security Division and the Security Service Division. The official gazette on the split was issued in 2017. The two divisions were merged again in 2025.

== Agencies ==
- Bangladesh Police
- Border Guard Bangladesh
- Bangladesh Coast Guard
- Bangladesh Ansar and Village Defence Party
- Investigation Agency-ICTBD
- National Telecommunication Monitoring Centre
