= Sheikh Moin Uddin =

Bangladeshi civil engineer

- শেখ মঈন উদ্দিন

Special Assistant to the Chief Adviser for Ministry of Road Transport and Bridges
- In office 5 March 2025 – 17 February 2026
- Chief Adviser: Muhammad Yunus

Special Assistant to the Chief Adviser for Ministry of Railways
- In office 14 July 2025 – 17 February 2026
- Chief Adviser: Muhammad Yunus

Personal details
- Occupation: Civil Engineer

Sheikh Moin Uddin is a Bangladeshi civil engineer. He was the Special Assistant to the Chief Adviser with the status of a Minister of State. He was in charge of the Ministry of Road Transport and Bridges and Ministry of Railways.
