= Bangladesh Rural Development Board =

Government agency of Bangladesh

- Formation: 1982
- Headquarters: Dhaka, Bangladesh
- Region served: Bangladesh
- Official language: Bengali
- Director General: AKM Tareq
- Website: www.brdb.gov.bd

The Bangladesh Rural Development Board, or BRDB, is a government agency responsible for the development in rural areas and is the largest government program involved in rural development in Bangladesh and is located in Dhaka, Bangladesh. The core of the BRDB efforts is the design and implementation of a series of integrated rural development (RD) projects (e.g. RD-5, RD-9 and RD-12) and a Rural Poor Cooperative Project (RPCP). The landless men and women, marginal and small farmers constitute the target population of these projects. In addition to facilitating agricultural co-operative programs, BRDB mobilizes the rural poor, marginal farmers, and women into cooperatives and informal groups, which allow them to engage in income generating activities, and improve standards of living.

== History ==
Since independence Bangladesh witnessed various experimentation with rural development approaches. In the initial years a number of voluntary and public agencies worked in the form of relief and rehabilitation work. In 1972, the government activated the Integrated Rural Development Program (IRDP) to replicate and expand the Comilla Model in other parts of the country. Later, in 1982, the program was transformed into an institution called Bangladesh Rural Development Board (BRDB).
