= Netzkraft Movement =

Political group

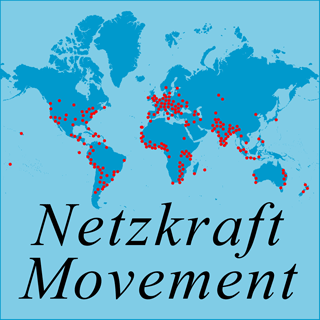
- Formation: 1990
- Founders: Dr. Jo Becker und Gertrud Sivalingam
- Location: Xanten, Nordrhein-Westfalen, Germany
- Members: 4395 (Date: 25. July 2024)
- Website: http://www.netzkraft.net

The Netzkraft Movement, based in Germany, is a cross-thematic and international network of individuals and groups who work for the common good. This commitment may be social, political, ecological or spiritual. The Netzkraft Movement which currently has more than 4,000 member organisations, provides the organizational structure for the interaction of its members. Since 2009, the Netzkraft Movement has had an entry in the Yearbook of International Organizations published by the Union of International Associations (UIA), a research institute and a documentation center, based in Brussels.

== History ==
The Netzkraft Movement was developed as part of a research project of the Institute of Systemic Research in Xanten in the years from 1990 to 1995. The support is the Sozialpsychiatrische Initiative Xanten (Spix e.V.), a non-profit association, that operates the Institute. The Institute's research projects explore and test networking opportunities. Something new should not be created by a new institution or organisation, but by sharing and mutual support between existing institutions or groups. The Institute in Xanten has supported and maintained the website of the Netzkraft Movement as a global network of non-profit organizations since 1995.

== The decentralized autonomous concept ==
The Netzkraft Movement is based on the principle of solidarity, i.e. the willingness to get to know other net participants and to support them as far as possible. The net participants remain autonomous, they themselves decide when and to what extent they look through the network for partners for exchange and cooperation. Once a year, the Institute sends a letter to all network participants. Further activities of the network are up to the network participants themselves.

== Basic consensus ==
The basic consensus consists of three shared global goals of the Netzkraft Movement which are binding for all network participants:

- International body for peace, human rights and the environment within the United Nations
- Sustainable eco-social economic development
- Decentralization of political power with regional self-determination

== Thematic areas ==
Aid for developing countries, Aid organization, Alternative economy, Antiracism, integration, Community project, Ecological research, futurology, Education, Environmental organization, Environmental project, Human rights, Media project, Peace policy, Spiritual organization, Volunteer work, Welfare, the handicapped, Women´s policy, feminist project

== Goal ==
The goal is the creation of an international and interdisciplinary network of socially committed groups that support and complement each other, thus gaining social influence. Contacts with each other and mutual support will strengthen the success of the individual network participant. As an international network the Netzkraft Movement stands up for the following global objectives: to strengthen the United Nations, sustainable environmental development and decentralized political decisions.

== Financing ==
The infrastructure provided is financed by the Institute for Systemic Research in Xanten.

== Known member organizations ==
- Village Volunteers(VV); United States, Seattle
- Solar Electric Light Fund (SELF); United States, Washington DC 20006
- 350.org; United States, Brooklyn, NY 11201
- WorldFish; Malaysia, Bayan Lepas, Penang
- German Doctors e. V.; Germany, Bonn
- Biowatch South Africa; South Africa, Durban 4001
- Medair; Schweiz, Ecublens;
- terre des hommes; Germany, Osnabrück
- International Network of Museums for Peace (INMP); Netherlands, The Hague
- WildEarth Guardians; United States, Santa Fe
- Transportation Alternatives; United States, New York, NY 10038
