= List of speeches by Muhammad Yunus as Chief Adviser of Bangladesh =

This is the list of speeches by Muhammad Yunus while serving as the Chief Adviser in the Interim government of Bangladesh.

== List of speeches ==
Date	Event/Topic	Location	Reference
9 Aug 2024	First speech as Chief Adviser of Bangladesh	Dhaka, Bangladesh	
25 August 2024	Updates about the works of Interim Government	Dhaka, Bangladesh	
11 September 2024	Updates about the works of Interim Government	Dhaka, Bangladesh	
26 September 2024	Clinton Global Initiative 2024 Meeting	New York City, United States	
27 September 2024	79th Session of United Nations General Assembly	New York City, United States	
17 November 2024	100 days of Interim Government	Dhaka, Bangladesh	
25 March 2025	Genocide Remembrance Day and Independence Day	Dhaka, Bangladesh	
6 Jun 2025	Eid-ul-Adha 2025	Dhaka, Bangladesh	
5 August 2025	1 year of July Uprising	Dhaka, Bangladesh	
26 September 2025	80th Session of United Nations General Assembly	New York City, United States	
13 November 2025	Updates about the works of Interim Government	Dhaka, Bangladesh	
16 December 2025	Victory Day of Bangladesh 2025	Dhaka, Bangladesh	
18 December 2025	Death of Politician and Activist Sharif Osman Bin Hadi	Dhaka, Bangladesh	
20 December 2025	Funeral of Politician and Activist Sharif Osman Bin Hadi	Dhaka, Bangladesh	
30 December 2025	Death of former Prime Minister Khaleda Zia	Dhaka, Bangladesh	
10 February 2026	12th National Election and National Referendum	Dhaka, Bangladesh	
16 February 2026	Farewell speech as the Chief Adviser of Bangladesh	Dhaka, Bangladesh	
