= Munshi Alauddin Al Azad =

Secretary of the Ministry of Religious Affairs
- Incumbent
- Assumed office 2 March 2026

Personal details
- Occupation: Civil servant

Munshi Alauddin Al Azad is a Bangladeshi retired civil servant and Secretary of the Ministry of Religious Affairs. He was a member of the independent investigation committee into the Bangladesh Rifles Revolt of the Muhammad Yunus-led Interim government.

== Career ==
Alauddin served in the Bangladesh civil administration until 2009. In that year, he was designated as an Officer on Special Duty by the Awami League government and did not subsequently return to a regular administrative posting. He retired from the civil service as a Joint Secretary.

After the fall of the Sheikh Hasina-led Awami League government, Azad was appointed a member of an independent investigation committee into the Bangladesh Rifles Revolt in December 2024. The Committee was led by retired Lieutenant General ALM Fazlur Rahman. The commission report blamed the mutiny on the Awami League and Prime Minister Sheikh Hasina.

On 2 March 2026, the Bangladesh Nationalist Party Government appointed him as Secretary to the Ministry of Religious Affairs for a one-year term on a contractual basis. Alauddin had no prior experience working in the Ministry of Religious Affairs. Sources within the relevant ministries told The Daily Star that no specific justification for his selection to the position had been provided. He would serve under the Minister of Religious Affairs, Shah Mofazzal Hossain Kaikobad. He replaced Md. Kamal Uddin, who was posted to the Ministry of Public Administration.
