= JN Deb Chowdhury =

Bangladeshi judge

Justice of the High Court Division of Bangladesh

Personal details
- Profession: Judge

JN Deb Chowdhury was a judge of the High Court Division of Bangladesh Supreme Court.

== Early life ==
Chowdhury was born on 15 March 1965 in Sylhet District, East Pakistan, Pakistan. He completed his bachelors in law at the University of Chittagong.

== Career ==
Chowdhury started as a lawyer on the district court on 16 April 1990. He was moved to the High Court Division on 11 May1992.

On 4 November 2001, Chowdhury became a lawyer of the Appellate Division.

Chowdhury was appointed an additional judge of the High Court Division on 12 February 2015.

=== Bibliography ===
- Labour and Industrial Law, Student Edition.

== Death ==
Chowdhury died on 15 December 2016 at Square Hospital, Dhaka from cancer.
