= Khairuzzaman Mozumder =

Khairuzzaman Mozumder is the incumbent Secretary at the Ministry of Finance of Bangladesh. Prior to joining here, he was secretary of the fuel and mineral resources department.

== Career ==
Mozumder started his career in the Bangladesh Civil Service in the 11th Batch in April 1993 as an administration cadre.

In 2017, Mozumder served in the USAID Bangladesh Trade Facilitation Activity project, as the chief of party, and oversaw the launch of a new website for Bangladesh Customs.

In January 2023, Mozumder was appointed the secretary of the Energy and Mineral Resources Division. Before that he was the additional secretary of the Finance Division at the Ministry of Finance.

In August 2023, Mozumder was appointed the Secretary of the Ministry of Finance replacing Fatima Yasmin who was appointed to the Asian Development Bank.
