= Faiz Ahmad Taiyeb =

Bangladeshi author and columnist (born 1982)

- ফাইজ় আহমেদ তাইয়েব
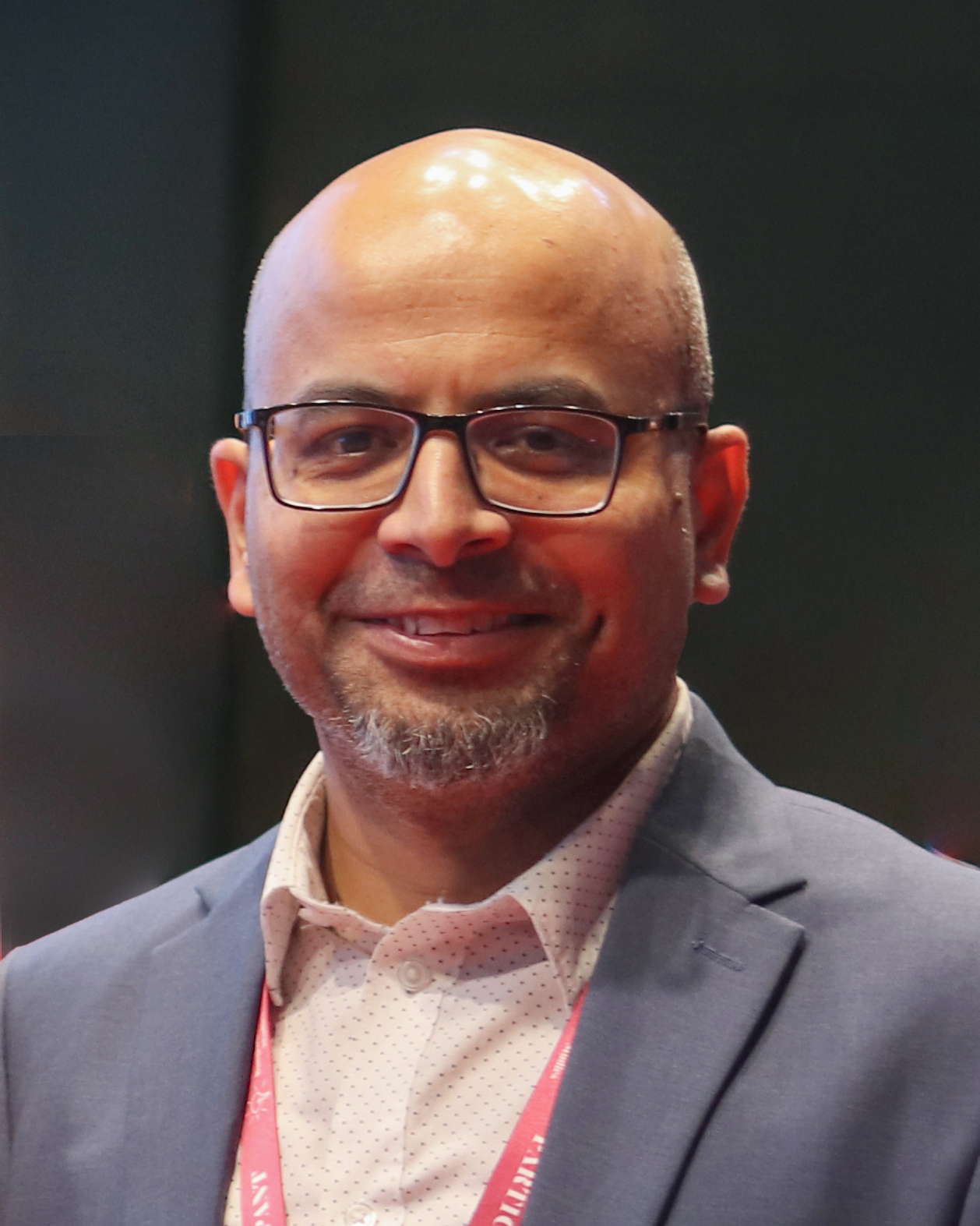
- Taiyeb in 2024

Special Assistant to the Chief Adviser for Ministry of Posts, Telecommunications and Information Technology
- In office 5 March 2025 – 17 February 2026
- Chief Adviser: Muhammad Yunus
- Preceded by: Sajeeb Wazed Joy
- Succeeded by: Rehan Asif Asad

Policy Adviser
- In office 4 September 2024 – 5 March 2025
- Chief Adviser: Muhammad Yunus

Personal details
- Born: 1982 (age 43–44) Laksam Upazila, Comilla District, Bangladesh
- Education: University of Dhaka (MBA) Bangladesh University of Engineering and Technology (BSc)
- Occupation: Lead Technical Architect; Author; Columnist

Faiz Ahmad Taiyeb (Bengali: ফাইজ় আহমেদ তাইয়েব; [faiz aɦmed taijeːb]) (born 1982) is a Bangladeshi-Dutch author, columnist, technology architect, who previously held the title of Special Assistant to the Chief Adviser of Bangladesh with the status of a Minister of State in Bangladesh. He was in charge of the Ministry of Posts, Telecommunications and Information Technology.

== Early life ==
Taiyeb was born in 1982 in Banduain village, Khila Union, Laksam Upazila of Comilla District. He completed his secondary education at Ideal School and College in 1997, and his higher secondary education at Dhaka College in 1999. In 2005, he earned his bachelor's degree in Electrical and Electronics Engineering from Bangladesh University of Engineering and Technology. He completed his MBA at the University of Dhaka in 2007.

== Career ==
In November 2023 Taiyeb wrote Bangladeshis Look to the US for Restoration of Democracy for The Diplomat.

Taiyeb has worked in numerous positions and roles. Before starting his work as the special assistant to the Chief Advisor on 5 March 2025, he was in charge of the policy advisor of Co-ordination and Reform of Information and Communication Technology Division. He is an author and columnist and has also been working as lead technology architect at VodafoneZiggo in the Netherlands. He has also been active in the blogging community. During his tenure as the Policy Advisor of the ICT Division, several questionable and unnecessary projects have been paused and suspended.

Taiyeb has worked to modify the Cyber Security Ordinance in January and has worked to remove 9 vexatious laws that were used by the previous government to harass and arrest citizens.

Taiyeb defended new satellite internet guidelines on Facebook, asserting that they do not allow government-imposed internet shutdowns following a report by The Daily Star. However, The Daily Star countered his claim, citing legal provisions that enable shutdowns through local internet gateways, sparking public debate over internet freedom in Bangladesh.

Taiyeb has worked later on to ensure no government can shut down the internet legally, as relevant laws are being amended. He has also worked to launch Starlink in Bangladesh and made necessary changes to ensure that the starlink operations will not hamper data sovereignty. He has also worked to reduce the import duty on raw materials for e-bikes, lithium batteries from 80% to 1%.

== Books ==
- চতুর্থ শিল্পবিপ্লব ও বাংলাদেশ (Fourth Industrial Revolution and Bangladesh), 2020, ISBN 978-9849266266
- বাংলাদেশঃ অর্থনীতির ৫০ বছর (Bangladesh: 50 years of economy), 2021, ISBN 978-9849542131
- অপ্রতিরোধ্য উন্নয়নের অভাবনীয় কথামালা (Incredible narratives of overwhelming development), 2022, ISBN 978-9849640462
- উন্নয়ন প্রশ্নে বাংলাদেশের কিছু সংকট ও সম্ভাবনা (Some crises and possibilities of Bangladesh in the development question), 2022, ISBN 978-9849638681
- বাংলাদেশের পানি, পরিবেশ ও বর্জ্য (Water, environment and waste management of Bangladesh), 2022, ISBN 978-9849677369
- ক্ষুদ্রঋণ, শিক্ষা, বেকারত্ব ও বিসিএস (Microcredit, Education, Unemployment and BCS), 2024, ISBN 978-9849877844
- উন্নয়নের নীতি ও দর্শন (Principles and Philosophy of Development), 2024, ISBN 978-9849879640
- Bangladesh Development Trajectory And Democracy Deficit, 2024, ISBN 978-9849879619
- বন্ধু রাষ্ট্র (Friendly Nation), 2025, ISBN 978-9849990949
