= Planning Division =

Government division of Bangladesh

- Formation: 1971; 55 years ago
- Headquarters: Dhaka, Bangladesh
- Region served: Bangladesh
- Official language: Bengali
- Website: Planning Division

Planning Division (Bengali: পরিকল্পনা বিভাগ) is a Bangladesh government division under the Ministry of Planning responsible for planning strategies and development goals for the government of Bangladesh. Iqbal Abdullah Harun is the Secretary in charge of the division.

== History ==
Planning Division was established in 1971 after the end of the Bangladesh Liberation war and was placed under the Ministry of Planning to help plan the recovery of the newly independent Bangladesh. In 2002, Bangladesh Bureau of Statistics was placed under the Planning Division after the Statistics Division was abolished by the government. The Bangladesh Bureau of Statistics was placed under the newly formed Statistics and Informatics Division in 2010.
