= The Economic and Labour Relations Review =

- Discipline: Economics, labour relations
- Language: English
- Edited by: Diana Kelly

Publication details
- History: 1990–present
- Publisher: Cambridge University Press
- Frequency: Quarterly
- Impact factor: 1.5 (2023)

Standard abbreviations
- ISO 4: Econ. Labour Relat. Rev.

Indexing
- ISSN: 1035-3046 (print); 1838-2673 (web)
- LCCN: 96658676
- OCLC no.: 746947141

Links
- Journal homepage; Online access; Online archive

The Economic and Labour Relations Review is a quarterly peer-reviewed academic journal covering the fields of economics, labour relations, and policy. The editor-in-chief is Diana Kelly (University of Wollongong) and the emerita editor is Anne Junor (University of New South Wales). The journal was established in 1990 and is published by Cambridge University Press in association with the School of Business, University of New South Wales.

== Abstracting and indexing ==
The journal is abstracted and indexed in Scopus and the Social Sciences Citation Index According to the Journal Citation Reports. the journal has a 2023 impact factor of 1.5.
