= Nur Khan Liton =

Bangladeshi lawyer

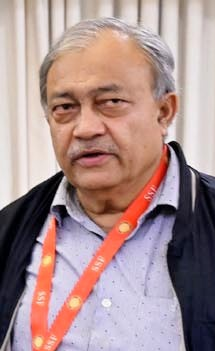
- Khan in 2025
- Occupations: Bangladeshi lawyer and human rights activist
- Known for: Human rights activist
- Awards: Global Human Rights Defender Awards by the United States Department of State

Nur Khan Liton is a Bangladeshi lawyer and human rights activist. He serves as a member of the Commission of Inquiry on Enforced Disappearances in Bangladesh. He is the former chief and secretary general of Ain o Salish Kendra, national legal aid organisation. He has spoken out against extrajudicial killings and human rights violations in Bangladesh. He has been critical of Enforced Disappearance in Bangladesh and called for investigation of the incidents.

== Career ==
In 1993, Liton wrote an article in the Dhaka Courier critical of Senator Tom Harkin's Child Labor Deterrence Act. He was involved with unions in Bangladesh.

On 15 May 2014, there was an alleged attempt to abduct Liton from Lalmatia, Dhaka. This was around the time a number of prominent abductions took place in Bangladesh including the Seven Murders of the Narayanganj. Liton filed a general diary with Mohammadpur Police Station regarding the incident.

Liton and 58 other prominent rights activists called the government to release of Mahmudur Rahman Manna, convenor of Nagorik Oikya, in December 2015. In October 2016, he called for an investigation into the deaths of two leaders of Bangladesh Jamaat-e-Islami who were killed in an alleged gunfight with Bangladesh Police. Liton told The New York Times that after the July 2016 Dhaka attack the government of Bangladesh killed at least 31 terror suspects in shootouts.

Liton spoke out against the abduction of Farhad Mazhar in July 2017. He criticized the extrajudicial killings committed during the Bangladesh drug war in 2018.

In 2019, Liton described fires in slums as a tactic used to evict poor people from their homes following a major fire in Chittagong. He called on the government of Bangladesh to interrogate a member of the Border Guard Police of Myanmar who was detained in the territory of Bangladesh and said the Rohingya refugees in Bangladesh had raised allegations against the guard of being involved in human rights violations against the Rohingya.

Liton was critical of the arrest of Ahmed Kabir Kishore, a cartoonist, in 2020 during the COVID-19 pandemic in Bangladesh. He criticized police visiting the home of Zillur Rahman, host of Tritiyo Matra, and described it as an intimidation tactic in December 2022. He praised United States sanctions on Bangladesh as having stopped extrajudicial killings in the country.

In 2023, Liton was awarded the Global Human Rights Defender Awards by the United States Department of State. Liton is an advisor of Human Rights Support Society.
