= Reform Commissions of Bangladesh =

Commissions to rebuild in Bangladesh

- Founder: Government of Bangladesh
- Type: Reform Commission
- Purpose: Establishing inclusive and democratic governance; Abolishing fascist regimes; Ensuring the rule of law; Strengthening and activating all state institutions
- Origins: Bangladesh
- Main organ: 11 commissions

The Reform Commissions of Bangladesh were formally announced on 11 September 2024 by the Chief Adviser of the interim government of Bangladesh, Muhammad Yunus. Based on the aspirations of the July Uprising of that year, their goal was to establish universal consensus regarding reforms required for the rebuilding of an anti-authoritarian and anti-fascist Bangladesh.

Eleven commissions were subsequently appointed, those considering reforms in public administration, anti-corruption, the judiciary, the police, the constitution, the electoral system, local government, women's affairs, labour rights, mass media, and healthcare. Additionally, a six-member task force led by the governor of Bangladesh Bank, Ahsan H. Mansur, was appointed to reform the banking sector. Four of the reform commissions submitted their reports to Muhammad Yunus on 15 January 2025.

== Background ==
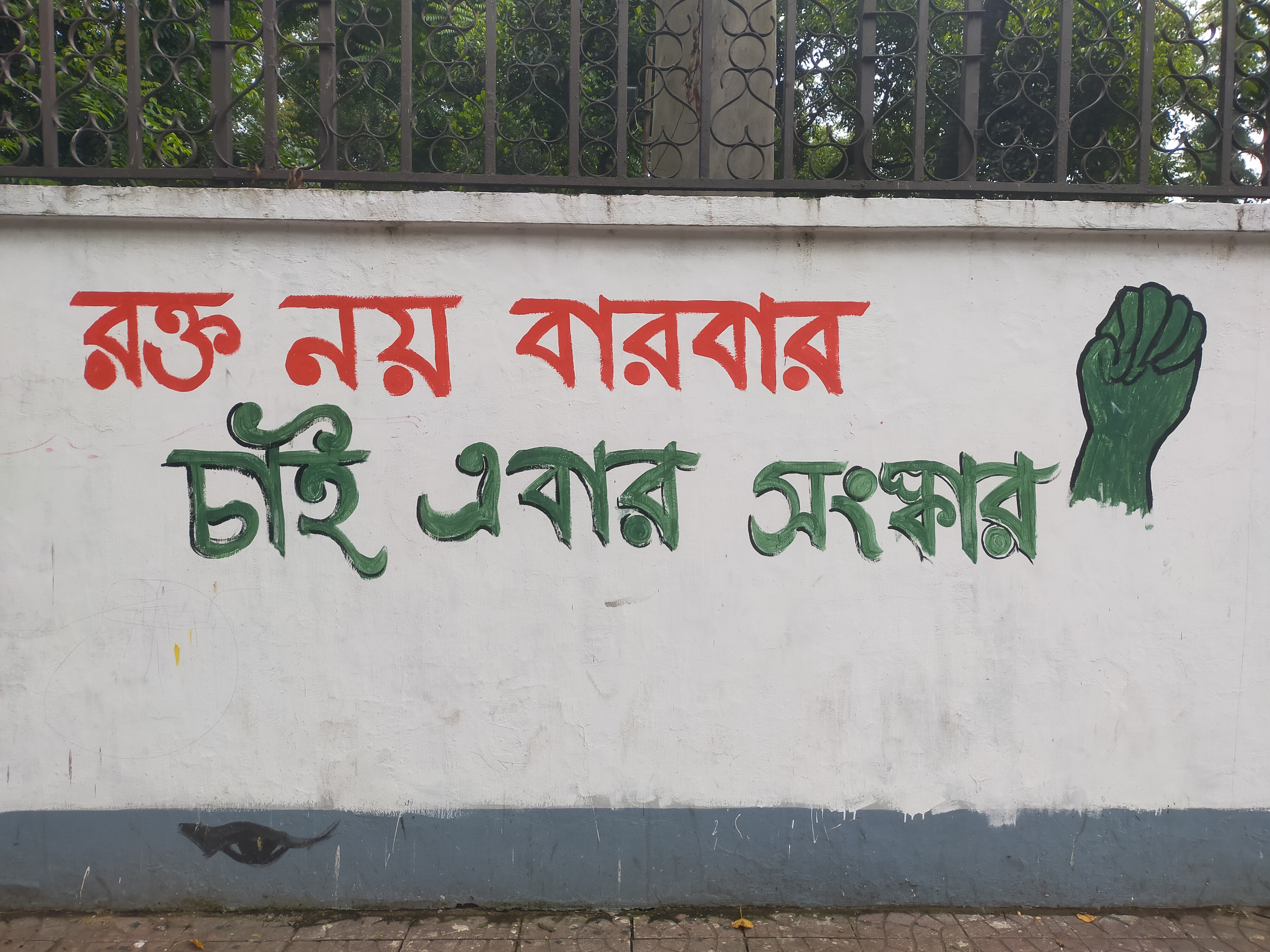
A graffiti of July Uprising at Baily Road, Dhaka, reading, " রক্ত নয় বারবার, চাই এবার সংস্কার " (lit. 'No more bloodshed, just reform this time.)

In June 2024, the Supreme Court of Bangladesh invalidated a 2018 government circular that had abolished the practice of reserving 30% of government jobs for the descendants of freedom fighters. In response, protests demanding reforms to the quota system erupted across the country, led by the group Students Against Discrimination. The government's crackdown on the movement turned violent, resulting in the deaths of 2,000 protesters. This triggered a nationwide non-cooperation movement, which ultimately led to the fall of the Sheikh Hasina-led Awami League government on 5 August 2024, ending its 15 year long reign.

Following this, at the request of student leaders, Muhammad Yunus agreed to lead an interim government, and the reform commissions were formed with the aim of establishing a new framework for governance based on an anti-authoritarian and anti-fascist political system. The head of each commission has the status of a Justice of the Appellate Division of the Supreme Court of Bangladesh.

Four of the reform commissions – Election, Anti-Corruption, Police, and Constitutional – submitted their reports to Chief Adviser Muhammad Yunus on 15 January 2025.

== Details of Reform Commissions ==
=== Public Administration Reform Commission ===
This commission was formed on 3 October 2024 with a brief to enhance efficiency, transparency, and accountability in public administration by proposing necessary reforms in administrative structures and governance practices. The commission is led by Abdul Muyeed Chowdhury, former chairman of Biman Bangladesh Airlines.

=== Anti-Corruption Reform Commission ===
This commission was formed on 3 October 2024 with a brief to eliminate systemic corruption, to reform institutions, and to restore transparency in governance. The commission is led by Iftekharuzzaman, executive director of Transparency International Bangladesh (TIB).

=== Judicial Reform Commission ===
This commission was formed on 3 October 2024 with a brief to propose necessary judicial reforms aimed at making the judiciary independent, impartial, and effective. The commission is led by Shah Abu Nayeem Mominur Rahman, former Justice of the Appellate Division of the Supreme Court of Bangladesh.

=== Electoral System Reform Commission ===
This commission was formed on 3 October 2024 with a brief to establish a representative and effective democracy in Bangladesh by ensuring free, fair, and participatory elections through the reform of the existing electoral system. The commission is headed by Badiul Alam Majumdar under a gazette notification issued by the Cabinet Division. The Legislative and Parliamentary Affairs Division of the Ministry of Law, Justice, and Parliamentary Affairs provides secretarial support to the commission, and the Election Commission Secretariat also assists the commission.

=== Constitutional Reform Commission ===
This commission was formed in September 2024 with a brief to prepare a report on the reasons behind past constitutional failures, and to create a roadmap for holding a constituent assembly election that can draft and adopt a new, inclusive, democratic constitution that ensures the inviolability of human dignity.

=== Women's Affairs Reform Commission ===
This commission was formed in November 2024 with a brief to prepare a report on the reasoning behind women's equal rights, how to restore women's dignity and respect in society, and how to reduce discrimination against women.

== Heads and members of commissions ==
The ministry has formed eleven reform commissions to reform perceived important areas of the government. The Head of Commission will have a status of a Justice of Appellate Division of the Supreme Court of Bangladesh.

The details of the head of commission and members are as follows.

Name	Position	Career Highlights
Public Administration Reform Commission
Abdul Muyeed Chowdhury	Head of Commission	Chairman, Biman Bangladesh Airlines Former Adviser of Latifur Rahman Caretaker Government
Mohammad Tareque	Member	Former Secretary
Muhammad Ayub Mia	Member	Former Secretary
Muhammad Mokhlesur Rahman	Member-Secretary	Senior Secretary, Ministry of Public Administration
Muhammad Hafizur Rahman	Member	Former Additional Secretary
Rezwan Khayer	Member	Former Additional Secretary
A. K. A. Firoz Ahmad	Member	Former Chairman, Department of Public Administration, University of Dhaka
Syeda Shahina Subhan	Member	Former Director of Centre for Medical Education
Firoz Ahmed	Member	Former Director General of Office of the Comptroller and Auditor General
Khandakar Mohammad Aminur Rahman	Member	Former Member of National Board of Revenue
Mehedi Hasan	Member	Student Representative, Jagannath University
Anti Corruption Commission Reform Commission
Iftekharuzzaman	Head of Commission	Executive Director, Transparency International Bangladesh
Ahmed Ataul Hakim	Member	Former Comptroller and Auditor General of Bangladesh
Mobasser Monem	Member	Professor, Department of Public Administration, University of Dhaka
Mushtaq Khan	Member	Professor, Department of Economics, SOAS University of London
Mahdin Chowdhury	Member	Bar-at-Law
Mahbubur Rahman	Member	Professor, Department of Law, University of Dhaka
Farzana Sharmin	Member	Advocate, Supreme Court of Bangladesh
Mubashshir Munim	Member	Student Representative, North South University
Judicial Reform Commission
Shah Abu Nayeem Mominur Rahman	Head of Commission	Former Justice, Appellate Division, Supreme Court of Bangladesh
Md. Emdadul Haque Azad	Member	Retired Justice, High Court Division, Supreme Court of Bangladesh Former District and Sessions Judge
Farid Ahmed Shibli	Member	Justice, High Court Division, Supreme Court of Bangladesh Former District and Sessions Judge
Sayed Aminul Islam	Member	Former District and Sessions Judge Former Registrar, Supreme Court of Bangladesh
Masdar Hossain	Member	Former District and Sessions Judge Plaintiff in the case of Masdar Hossain v. State
Tanim Hossain Shawon	Member	Barrister-at-law and Senior Advocate, Supreme Court of Bangladesh
Kazi Mahfuzul Haq Shupon	Member	Associate Professor, Department of Law, University of Dhaka
Arman Hossain	Member	Student Representative, University of Dhaka
Police Reform Commission
Safar Raj Hossain	Head of Commission	Former Secretary
Abu Momtaz Saad Uddin Ahmed	Member-Secretary	Additional Secretary, Public Security Division, Ministry of Home Affairs
Muhammad Iqbal	Member	Former Additional Secretary Former Director General, Department of Narcotics Control
Muhammad Harun Chowdhury	Member	Former Divisional Commissioner and Additional Secretary
Sheikh Md. Sajjad Ali	Member	Police Commissioner, Dhaka Metropolitan Police, Bangladesh Police Former Additional Inspector General of Bangladesh Police
Md. Rafiqul Hasan	Member	Joint Secretary (Drafting), Legislative & Parliamentary Affairs Division, Ministry of Law, Justice and Parliamentary Affairs
Md. Golam Rosul	Member	Deputy Inspector General of Bangladesh Police Chief of Special Branch, Bangladesh Police
Mohammad Ashfaqul Alam	Member	Deputy Inspector General of Bangladesh Police Commandant, Police Training Centre, Tangail
Shanaz Huda	Member	Professor, Department of Law, University of Dhaka
A. S. M. Nasiruddin Elan	Member	Human rights activist
Mohammad Jarif Rahman	Member	Researcher and Student Representative
Electoral System Reform Commission
Badiul Alam Majumdar	Head of Commission	Editor, Shushashoner Jonno Nagorik Election and Local Government Expert
Tofail Ahmed	Member	Former Professor and Chairman of Department of Public Administration, University of Chittagong Educator, Local Government and Election Expert
Jesmin Tuli	Member	Former Additional Secretary, Bangladesh Election Commission Electoral System, Voter Registration and National Identity Card Expert
Md. Abdul Alam	Member	Election Expert
Zahed Ur Rahman	Member	Political Expert and Opinion Maker
Mir Nadia Nivin	Member	Governance and Institutional Reform Expert
Muhammed Sadek Ferdous	Member	Electronic Voting and Blockchain Expert
Sadiq Al Arman	Member	Student Representative, East West University
Constitutional Reform Commission
Ali Riaz	Head of Commission	Political scientist and Writer
Sumaiya Khair	Member	Professor, Department of Law, University of Dhaka
Imran Siddique	Member	Bar-at-Law
Muhammad Ekramul Haque	Member	Professor, Department of Law, University of Dhaka
Sharif Bhuiyan	Member	Senior Advocate, Supreme Court of Bangladesh
M Moin Alam Firozi	Member	Bar-at-Law
Firoz Ahmed	Member	Writer
Md. Mostain Billah	Member	Writer and Human rights activist
Mahfuj Alam	Member	Student Representative (7 October 2024 - 10 November 2024)
Saleh Uddin Sifat	Member	Student Representative
Labor Reform Commission
Syed Sultan Uddin Ahmed	Head of Commission	Executive Director, Bangladesh Institute of Labour Studies
Mahfuzul Haq	Member	Former Secretary of Ministry of Labour and Employment and Ministry of Environment, Forest and Climate Change
Zakir Hossain	Member	Professor, Institute of Bangladesh Studies, University of Rajshahi
Tapan Dutta	Member	President, Chattogram Divisional Committee, Bangladesh Trade Union Centre
A. K. M. Nasir	Member	Advocate and Former President of Bangladesh Labour Court Bar Association
M Kamran T Rahman	Member	Former President of Bangladesh Employer's Federation
N/A	Member	Student Representative
Women's Affairs Reform Commission
Shirin Parvin Haque	Head of Commission	Founding Member, Naripokkho
Maheen Sultan	Member	Senior Fellow, BRAC Institute of Governance and Development
Sara Hossain	Member	Honorary Executive Director, Bangladesh Legal Aid and Services Trust
Fawzia Karim Firoze	Member	Senior Advocate, Supreme Court of Bangladesh and President, Foundation for Law & Development
Kalpona Akter	Member	President, Bangladesh Garment and Industrial Workers Federation
Halida Hanum Akhter	Member	Women Health Expert
Sumaiya Islam	Member	Executive Director, Bangladesh Nari Sramik Kendra
Nirupa Dewan	Member	Former Member, National Human Rights Commission of Bangladesh
Ferdousi Sultana	Member	Former Senior Social Development Adviser, Asian Development Bank
Nishita Jaman Niha	Member	Student Representative
Local Government Reform Commission
Tofail Ahmed	Head of Commission	Former Professor and Charman of Department of Public Administration, University of Chittagong Educator, Local Government and Election Expert
Ferdous Arfina Osman	Member	Professor, Department of Public Administration, University of Dhaka Former Chairman of Department of Public Administration, University of Dhaka
A. M. M. Nasir Uddin	Member	Former Secretary
Abdur Rahman	Member	Advocate, Supreme Court of Bangladesh
Mahfuz Kabir	Member	Director, BISS
Masuda Khan Shefali	Member	Executive Director, Nari Uddug Kendra
Md. Tarikul Islam	Member	Professor, Department of Government and Politics, Jahangirnagar University
N/A	Member	Student Representative
Mass Media Reform Commission
Kamal Ahmed	Head of Commission	Journalist
Gitiara Nasreen	Member	Professor, Department of Mass Communication and Journalism, University of Dhaka
Samsul Haque Jahid	Member	Editor, The Financial Express and Representative, Editor's Council
Aktar Hossain Khan	Member	Secretary, Newspaper Owners' Association of Bangladesh
	Member	Representative, Association of Television Channel Owners (ATCO)
Syed Abdal Ahmed	Member	Former General Secretary of Jatiya Press Club
Fahim Ahmed	Member	Chief Executive Officer, Jamuna Television and Trustee, Broadcast Journalist Center
Jimi Amir	Member	Journalist and Convenor, Media Support Network
Mustafa Sabuj	Member	Bogra District Representative, The Daily Star
Titu Dutta Gupta	Member	Deputy Editor, The Business Standard
Abdullah Al Mamun	Member	Student Representative
Health Sector Reform Commission
AK Azad Khan	Head of Commission	President, Diabetic Association of Bangladesh
Mohammad Zakir Hossain	Member	Professor, Department of Public Health and Informatics, Bangladesh Medical University
Liaquat Ali	Member	Chairman, Pothikrit Foundation
Saiba Aktar	Member	Gynecologist
Naila Zaman Khan	Member	Professor, Department of Pediatric Neuroscience, Dhaka Shishu Hospital
M. M. Reza	Member	Former Secretary
Mojaherul Haque	Member	Former Regional Adviser, South East Asia Region, World Health Organization
Ajharul Islam	Member	ICDDR,B
Syed Md Akram Hussain	Member	Senior Consultant Clinical Oncology & Radiotherapy, Square Cancer Centre, Square Hospital
Syed Atikul Haque	Member	Chief Consultant, Green Life Center for Rheumatic Care and Research
Ahmed Ehsanur Rahman	Member	Scientist, Department of Child and Maternal Health, ICDDR,B
Umayer Afif	Member	Student Representative

== National Consensus Commission ==
The ministry also formed a National Consensus Commission to decide on the process for implementing reforms suggested by the commissions with various political parties and stakeholders. Its members are as follows.

Name	Position in Government	Position in Commission
Muhammad Yunus	Chief Adviser	Chairperson
Ali Riaz	Head of Commission, Constitutional Reform Commission	Vice Chairperson
Muhammad Ayub Mia	Member, Public Administration Reform Commission	Member
Safar Raj Hossain	Head of Commission, Police Reform Commission	Member
Badiul Alam Majumdar	Head of Commission, Electoral System Reform Commission	Member
Md. Emdadul Haque Azad	Member, Judicial Reform Commission	Member
Iftekharuzzaman	Head of Commission, Anti-Corruption Commission Reform Commission	Member
