= National Constitutional Council (Bangladesh) =

Proposed national institution in Bangladesh

- জাতীয় সাংবিধানিক কাউন্সিল
- Government Seal of Bangladesh

Agency overview
- Jurisdiction: Bangladesh
- Website: crc.legislativediv.gov.bd

The National Constitutional Council (NCC; Bengali: জাতীয় সাংবিধানিক কাউন্সিল) is a proposed national institution proposed by the Constitutional Reform Commission of the interim government of Bangladesh in 2025. It is composed of representatives from the three branches of the state. Under the proposed reform, the National Constitutional Council (NCC) will play a pivotal role in ensuring transparency, accountability, and balance among various state institutions.

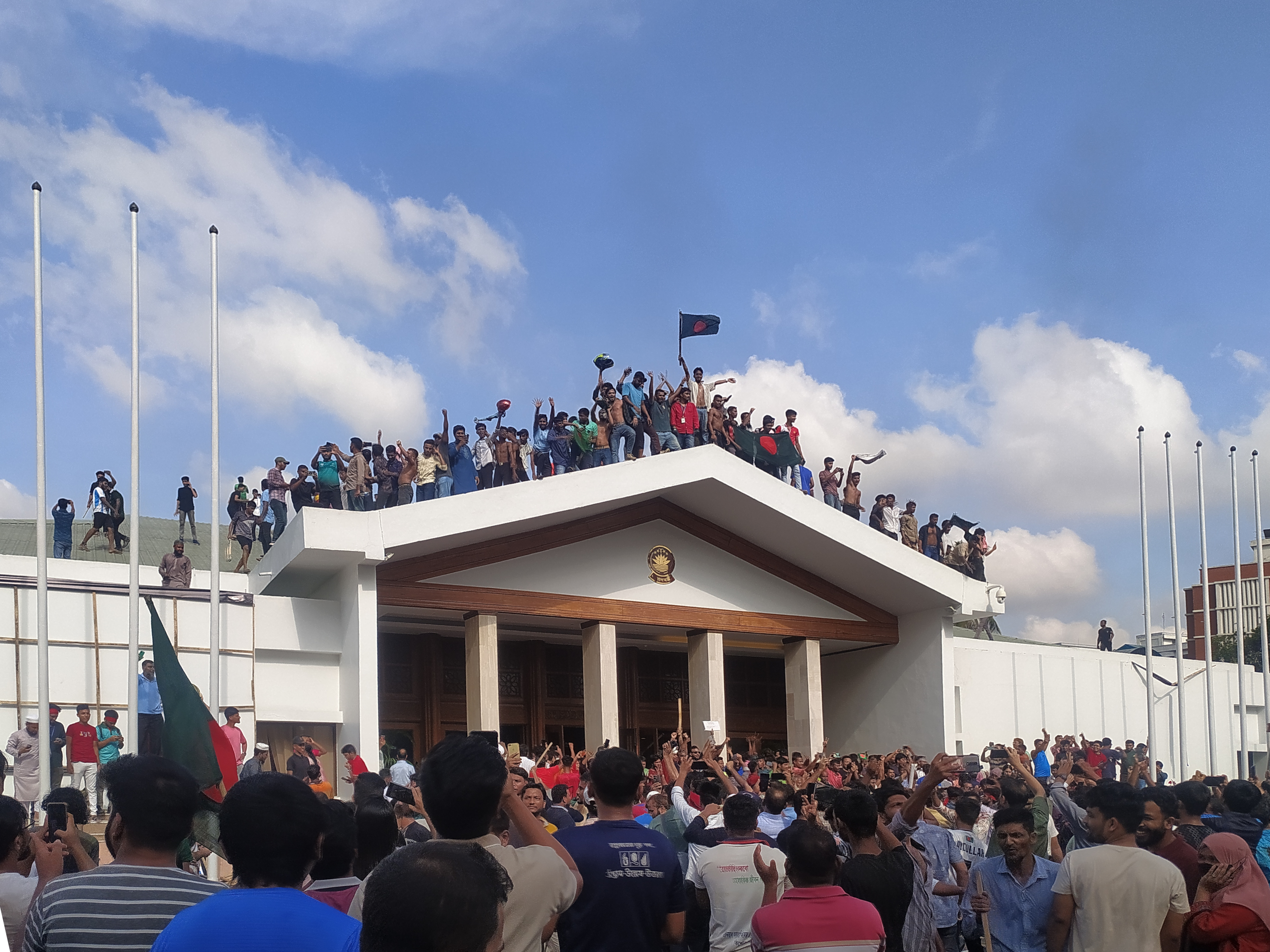
People occupying the Prime Minister's Office after the ousting of Sheikh Hasina in the July Uprising

== History ==
A mass uprising known as July Uprising took place on August 5, leading to Sheikh Hasina fleeing the country and seeking refuge in India. In the ensuing situation, an Interim government was formed under Muhammad Yunus. To implement reforms, the interim government established Constitutional Reform Commission on October 6, 2024, headed by Professor Ali Riaz. The commission submitted its report to Chief Adviser Muhammad Yunus on January 15, 2025. This report proposed the creation of a National Constitutional Council (NCC). On January 16, an all-party dialogue commenced to discuss this proposal.

In July 2025, the commission mulled about introducing term limits by restricting a person from holding the prime ministerial position for more than 10 years. The NCP & Jamaat-e-Islami agreed, but the BNP (whose leader Khaleda Zia had already served as prime minister from 1991 to 1996 & 2001 to 2006) & the Communist Party of Bangladesh opposed it. The BNP later agreed to support the interim government's steps regarding term limits on the condition that plans to create a "National Constitutional Council" be shelved.

== Members ==
The National Constitutional Council (NCC) is a national institution composed of representatives from the three branches of the state. Members of the NCC will include:

1. President
2. Prime Minister
3. Leader of the Opposition
4. Speaker of the Lower House
5. Speaker of the Upper House
6. Chief Justice of Bangladesh
7. Deputy Speaker of the Lower House nominated by the Opposition
8. Deputy Speaker of the Upper House nominated by the Opposition
9. One member nominated from among the remaining members of both houses of the legislature (excluding members representing the political parties of the Prime Minister and the Leader of the Opposition) by majority vote of the members of both houses. This vote must be held within seven (7) working days from the date of formation of both houses of the legislature. In the case of a coalition government, members of coalition parties other than the party represented by the Prime Minister will be eligible to vote in this nomination.

Even if the legislature is dissolved, the existing NCC members will remain active until the Chief Adviser of the interim government is sworn in. During the absence of a legislature, the members of the NCC will be:

1. President
2. Chief Adviser
3. Chief Justice of Bangladesh
4. Two members of the Advisory Council nominated by the Chief Adviser

== Responsibility ==
The NCC will submit names to the President for appointment to the following positions:

1. The Chief Election Commissioner and other Election Commissioners
2. The Attorney General and Additional Attorney Generals
3. The Chairperson and other Commissioners of the Public Service Commission
4. The Chairperson and other Commissioners of the Anti-Corruption Commission
5. The Chairperson and other Commissioners of the Human Rights Commission
6. The Chairperson and other Commissioners of the Local Government Commission
7. The Chief of Defence Forces
8. Any other positions prescribed by law

The Chief Adviser shall submit the name of the nominee for the NCC appointment to the President. The NCC shall also perform other functions as prescribed by the Constitution. Additionally, the legislature may assign the NCC further responsibilities through legislation.

== Meetings and Procedures ==
The NCC shall convene at least one meeting every three months. However, the President may call a special meeting at any time. In case of urgency, if at least three NCC members submit a written request, the President shall be obliged to convene an emergency meeting. The President shall preside over NCC meetings regularly, and in their absence, the Chief Justice shall assume the role of chairperson. Unless otherwise specified in the Constitution, all decisions shall be made by a majority of the total number of NCC members. The quorum for an NCC meeting shall be constituted by the presence of the majority of its total members. The NCC shall formulate its own procedures and necessary regulations to fulfill its objectives.

== See also ==
- Constitutional Reform Commission
- Criticism of the Constitution of Bangladesh
- 2024 Bangladesh constitutional crisis
- 2026 Bangladeshi general election
- Interim government of Muhammad Yunus
