= National Consensus Commission =

Seven-member commission in Bangladesh (2025)

- জাতীয় ঐকমত্য কমিশন
- Government Seal of Bangladesh

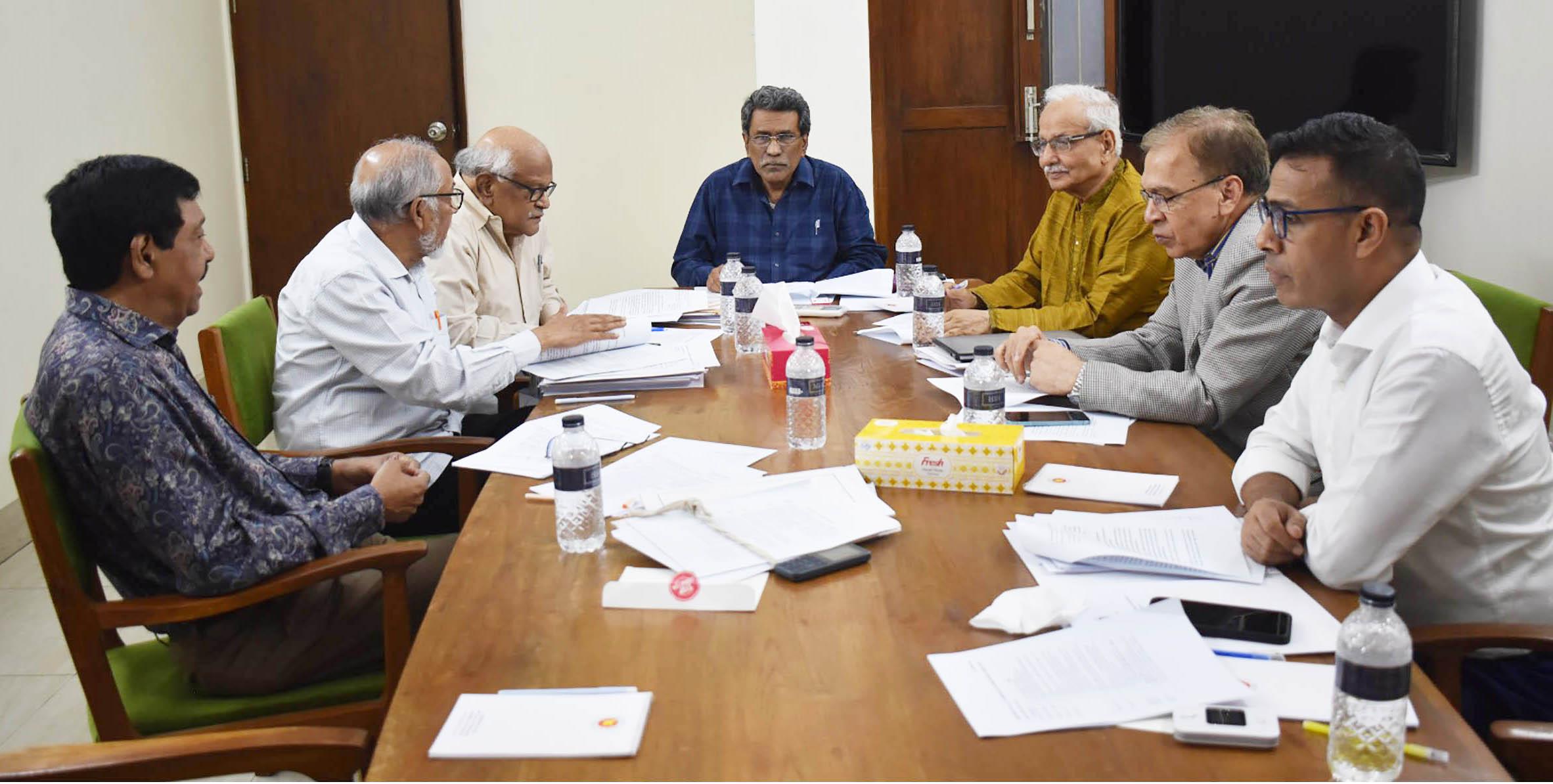
- Members of the National Consensus Commission at a general meeting

Reform Commission overview
- Formed: February 13, 2025; 14 months ago
- Dissolved: October 31, 2025; 6 months ago
- Jurisdiction: Bangladesh
- Headquarters: Block 01, MP Hostel, National Parliament, Dhaka, Bangladesh
- Reform Commission executives: Chairperson, Muhammad Yunus; Vice Chairperson, Ali Riaz
- Key document: July Charter

The National Consensus Commission (Bengali: জাতীয় ঐকমত্য কমিশন) was a seven-member body formed by the Interim government of Bangladesh on 13 February 2025 to review and adopt the recommendations of six reform commissions. The commission was chaired by Chief Adviser Muhammad Yunus and was tasked with fostering national consensus on key governance reforms.

== Members ==
The commission consists of seven members:

Name	Position in Government	Position in Commission
Muhammad Yunus	Chief Adviser	Chairperson
Ali Riaz	Head of Commission, Constitutional Reform Commission	Vice Chairperson
Muhammad Ayub Mia	Member, Public Administration Reform Commission	Member
Safar Raj Hossain	Head of Commission, Police Reform Commission	Member
Badiul Alam Majumdar	Head of Commission, Electoral System Reform Commission	Member
Md. Emdadul Haque Azad	Member, Judicial Reform Commission	Member
Iftekharuzzaman	Head of Commission, Anti Corruption Commission Reform Commission	Member

== Consensus ==
The commission identified several recommendations from six reform commissions as immediately actionable, to be implemented through legal or administrative means. It discussed 166 key proposals with political parties in the country.

In the first phase, the commission met separately with 33 political parties and alliances, and later it began issue-based discussions on 20 unresolved fundamental proposals. Consensus was reached on 62 issues, mainly from the Judicial Reform Commission and the Anti-Corruption Commission, along with six from the Public Administration Reform Commission. The Constitutional Reform Commission submitted 18 proposals, including the formation of a bicameral parliament, which gained support from 30 parties but remained unresolved due to disagreement over its structure.

In the second phase, consensus was reached on 14 additional issues.

== Formulation of the July Charter ==
In the post July Uprising context, the seven-member National Consensus Commission, formed in February 2025, reviewed proposals from 11 reform commissions and conducted a 72-day dialogue in three phases with various political parties and stakeholders to develop a consensus-based framework for political and administrative reforms. Among the 166 issues raised in the first phase, consensus was reached on 64, which later formed the basis for the July Charter containing 28 commitments.

The draft text was finalized on 28 July and sent to the political parties for feedback. After discussions on implementation procedures throughout August and September, the draft was finalized on 11 September, and the final copies were delivered to the parties between 14 and 15 October.

The charter included commitments for reforms relating to state structure, democratic governance, administrative transparency, and citizen participation. On 17 October, Chief Adviser Muhammad Yunus and representatives from 25 political parties signed the charter at the South Plaza of the Jatiya Sangsad, with other two parties signing later, bringing the total to 26 political parties. Some leftist parties refrained from signing the charter.

On the day of signing, clashes outside the Parliament complex and extensive international media coverage drew significant attention. In the aftermath of the signing, the commission considered the possibility of a referendum or alternative mechanisms to ensure the implementation of the charter.
