= Constitutional Reform Commission =

Government of Bangladesh Commission

- সংবিধান সংস্কার কমিশন
- Government Seal of Bangladesh

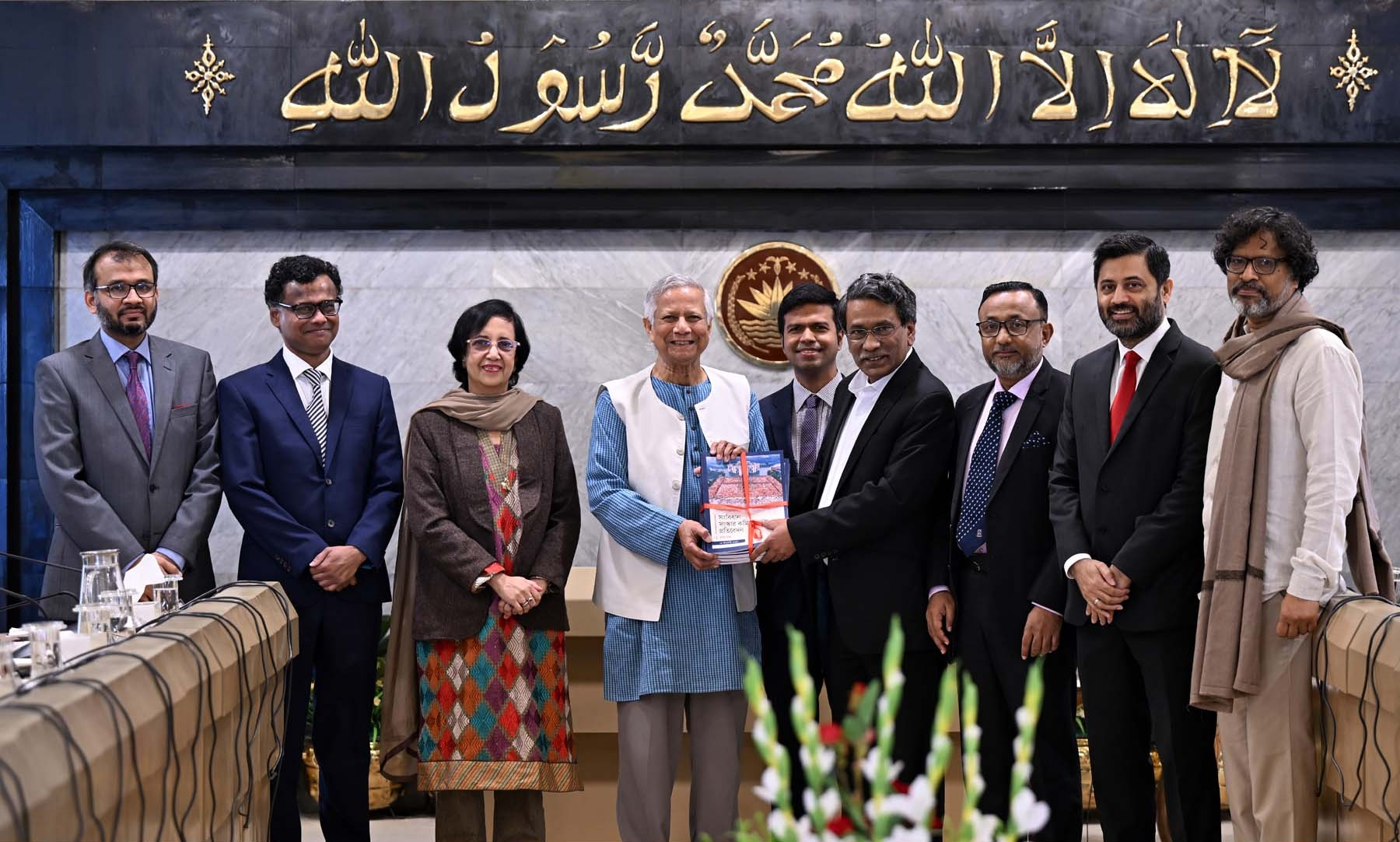
- Members submitting reports to the Chief Adviser Muhammad Yunus

Reform Commission overview
- Formed: October 6, 2024; 22 months ago
- Dissolved: January 15, 2025; 19 months ago
- Jurisdiction: Bangladesh
- Headquarters: MP Hostel, Jatiya Sangsad, Sher-e-Bangla Nagar, Dhaka, Bangladesh
- Head responsible: Ali Riaz
- Key document: July Charter
- Website: crc.legislativediv.gov.bd

The Constitutional Reform Commission (Bengali: সংবিধান সংস্কার কমিশন, romanized: Sôṅbidhān Sôṅskār Kômiśôn) was established by the Interim government in September 2024 with a purpose to prepare a report on the reasons behind the past constitutional failures and to create a roadmap for holding a constituent assembly election to draft and adopt a new, inclusive, democratic constitution, ensuring the inviolability of human dignity.

The commission was formed in the aftermath of a constitutional crisis triggered by the July Uprising that culminated in the ousting of Sheikh Hasina on 5 August 2024. The commission is chaired by Ali Riaz.

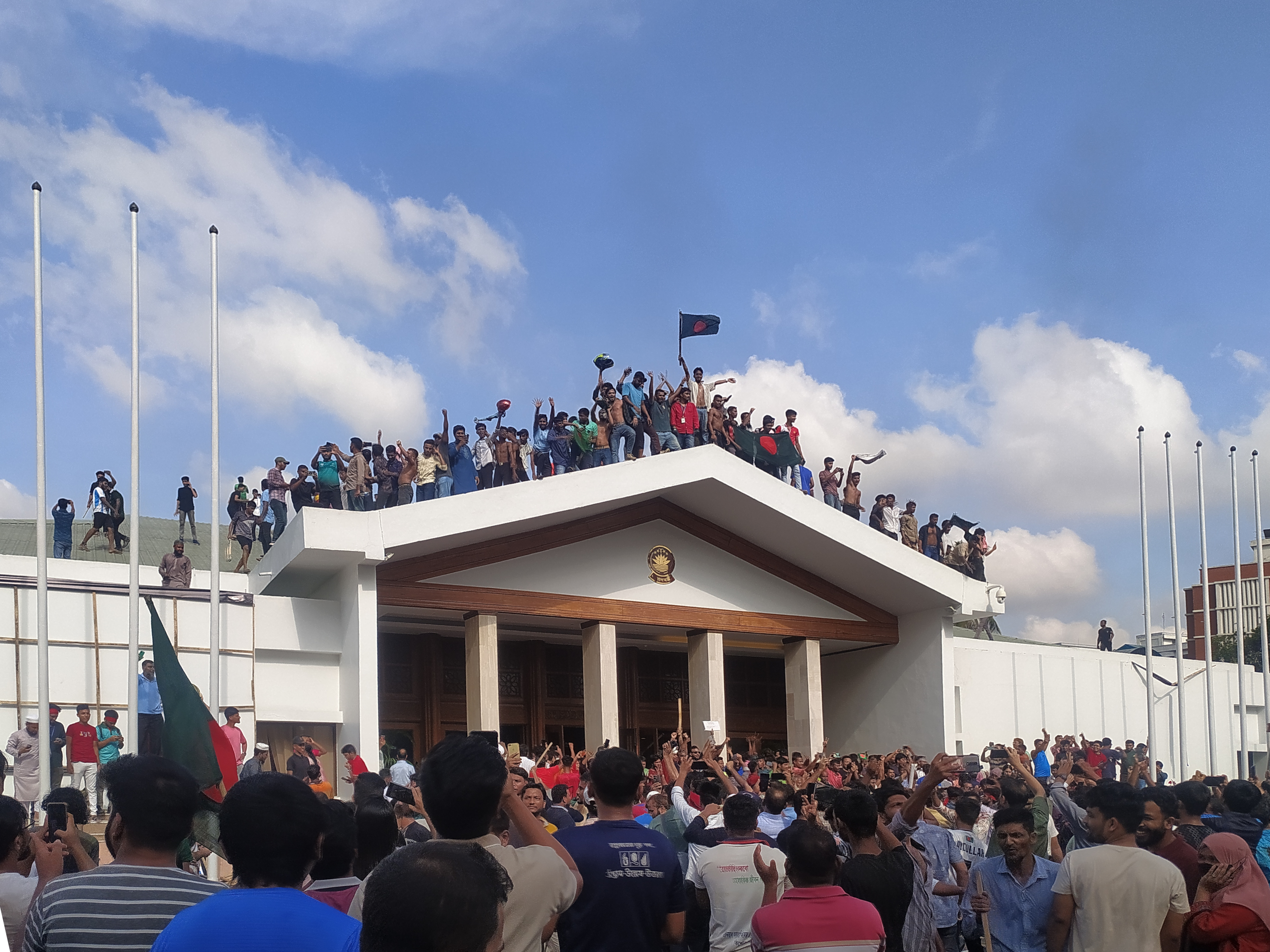
People occupying the Prime Minister's Office after the ousting of Sheikh Hasina in the July Uprising

== Background ==
The commission was formed following the ouster of the previous government, led by Sheikh Hasina, during the July Uprising, which forced her to flee to India on 5 August 2024. This paved the way for the formation of an Interim government under Muhammad Yunus, who was appointed as Chief Adviser. The government aimed to initiate reforms across multiple sectors concerning corruption, electoral fraud, and authoritarianism. A prominent intellectuals like Farhad Mazhar said that the country was going through a "constitutional vacuum" as the there is no provision for any kind of interim government in the current constitution. Nevertheless, Bangladeshi courts have upheld the Yunus government's legitimacy under the doctrine of necessity. Court opinions have held that Hasina's resignation created a situation for which there was no constitutional remedy, and an interim government was needed to address urgent matters in state affairs.

The formation of the constitutional reform commission was part of a broader agenda to implement systematic changes across Bangladesh's core institutions, such as the judiciary, public administration, electoral processes, and the anti-Corruption. The Interim government's reform efforts were influenced by the mass uprising, which brought national attention to issues of systemic corruption and democratic backsliding.

== History ==
The constitutional reform commission was announced on 11 September 2024, along with five other commissions. In his public address, Chief Adviser have emphasized that reforming the constitutional and electoral frameworks was essential to halting the recurring cycles of political violence and authoritarianism that had plagued Bangladesh. He also stressed that the reform process would ensure public ownership of the state and uphold the principles of accountability and welfare.

Additionally, the commission was tasked with reviewing existing laws related to political party registration, campaign finance, and voter rights.

=== Appointment of Ali Riaz ===
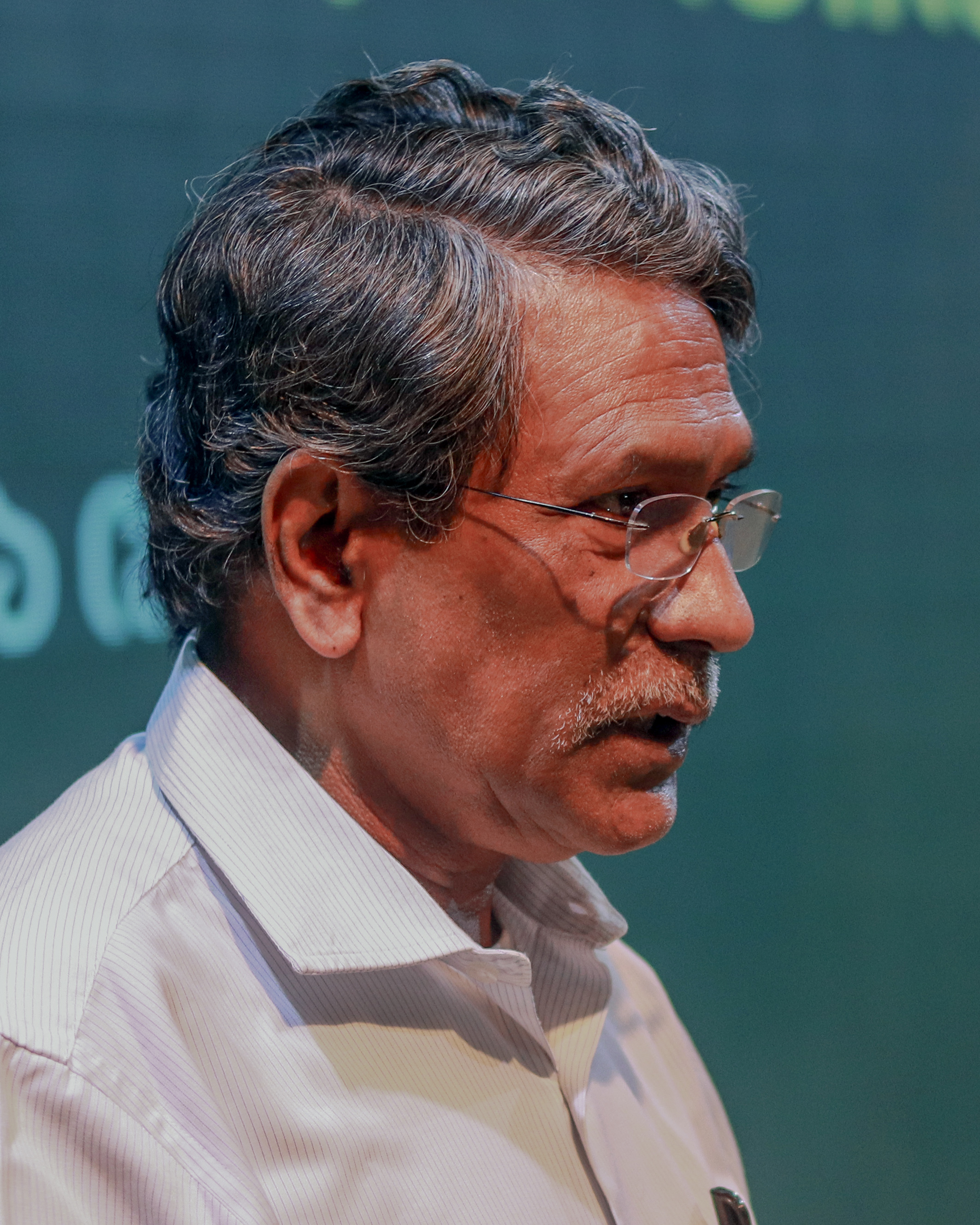
Ali Riaz, a political science professor at Illinois State University, was appointed as the head of the commission.

Initially, the commission was to be led by lawyer Shahdeen Malik. However, shortly after its formation, the government announced that Malik would be replaced by Ali Riaz, a professor of political science at Illinois State University. Riaz, known for his expertise in South Asian politics, was entrusted with leading the commission's activities. His appointment was seen as an effort to bring an international perspective to the reform process, though it also underscored the delicate political environment within the interim government.

Before being appointed as the head of the commission, Riaz actively advocated for redrafting a new constitution. In a conference organized by the Center for Governance Studies Riaz said:

I'm talking about redrafting a new constitution because there's no way to amend it. The current constitution has limited options for amendment. A third of the constitution was drafted in such a way that it cannot be altered. There are certain provisions within it, which, if not removed, nothing can be done. That's why the term "redrafting" or "rewriting" is being used. I'm mentioning the Constituent Assembly as a path for rewriting. I don't know if there is any other way.

== Members ==
On 7 October 2024, the government announced names of the nine members of the commission, which is listed below:

Name	Position	Background
Ali Riaz	Head of Commission	Political scientist and Writer
Sumaiya Khair	Member	Professor, Department of Law, University of Dhaka
Imran Siddique	Member	Bar-at-Law
Muhammad Ekramul Haque	Member	Professor, Department of Law, University of Dhaka
Sharif Bhuiyan	Member	Senior Advocate, Supreme Court of Bangladesh
M Moin Alam Firozi	Member	Bar-at-Law
Firoz Ahmed	Member	Writer
Md. Mostain Billah	Member	Writer and Human rights activist
Mahfuj Alam	Member	Student Representative (7 October 2024 - 10 November 2024)
Saleh Uddin Sifat	Member	Student Representative

== Scope and Purpose ==
The reform includes review of the present constitution and the general amendment, addition, alteration, revision, rearrangement and rewriting of the constitution to reflect the aspirations of the people.

The purpose of reform of the Constitution:

1. Attaining equality, human dignity and social justice as the promised objectives of the Liberation War of 1971 waged in pursuance of a long struggle and establishing a non-discriminatory and republican state inspired by the mass upsurge of the students and people in 2024.
2. Fulfillment of the people's desire to establish a participatory and democratic state as expressed through the mass upsurge of the students and people of 2024.
3. Ensuring effective participation of people at all levels in politics and state administration.
4. Preventing the emergence of any fascist system of governance in future.
5. Ensuring the separation and balance of powers between the three organs of the state: executive, legislature, and judiciary.
6. Decentralizing and adequately empowering state authorities and institutions.
7. Ensuring effective independence and autonomy of state institutions, constitutional functionaries and statutory bodies.

== Recommendations ==
On January 15, 2025, the commission submitted a report having recommendations for reforming the constitution. The recommendations are:

=== Citizenship ===
1. The commission recommends that the words 'প্রজাতন্ত্র' (Note: The proposal to replace "প্রজাতন্ত্র" (Prajatantra) with "নাগরিকতন্ত্র" (Nagoriktontra) as the Bengali translation of "republic" reflects a nuanced shift in emphasis. "প্রজাতন্ত্র" derives from "প্রজা" (Praja, meaning subjects) and "তন্ত্র" (Tantra, governance), historically linked to subjects under a monarch, later adapted to mean rule by the people. In contrast, "নাগরিকতন্ত্র" comes from "নাগরিক" (Nagorik, meaning citizen) and "তন্ত্র", highlighting the role of autonomous, equal citizens in governance. While both terms translate to "republic" in English, "প্রজাতন্ত্র" retains historical ties to monarchic transitions, whereas "নাগরিকতন্ত্র" emphasizes modern civic agency and democratic participation.) and 'গণপ্রজাতন্ত্রী বাংলাদেশ' (Note: The recommendation to replace "গণপ্রজাতন্ত্রী বাংলাদেশ" (Gonoprojatontree Bangladesh) with "জনগণতন্ত্রী বাংলাদেশ" (Jono-gonotontree Bangladesh) highlights a subtle but significant difference in emphasis. "গণপ্রজাতন্ত্রী" derives from "গণ" (Gono, the masses), "প্রজা" (Proja, subjects), and "তন্ত্রী" (Tontree, governance), signifying rule by the collective masses but retaining historical undertones of subjects under a monarch. In contrast, "জনগণতন্ত্রী" comes from "জনগণ" (Jonogon, the people) and "তন্ত্রী", focusing on governance by free and equal citizens, removing the subservient connotation of প্রজা. While both terms mean "People's Republic" in English, "গণপ্রজাতন্ত্রী" reflects a historical transition from monarchies, whereas "জনগণতন্ত্রী" emphasizes modern democratic ideals and civic agency.) in all applicable parts of the constitution be replaced by 'নাগরিকতন্ত্র' and 'জনগণতন্ত্রী বাংলাদেশ' respectively. However, in the English version, the terms "Republic" and "People's Republic of Bangladesh" will remain unchanged.
2. Language: The state language of the republic (নাগরিকতন্ত্র) will be 'Bangla'. All languages used as mother tongues by citizens of Bangladesh will be recognized as prevailing languages in the constitution.
3. Citizenship: 'The people of Bangladesh shall be known as Bangalees...' The commission recommends abolishing this provision. It is suggested that the current Article 6(2) be amended as follows: "The citizens of Bangladesh shall be known as 'Bangladeshis" to replace the existing provision.
4. The commission recommends the repeal of Articles 7A and 7B concerning constitutional offenses and limitations on constitutional amendments.
5. Fundamental Principles of the Constitution:
  1. The commission recommends including equality, human dignity, social justice, pluralism, and democracy as fundamental principles of the constitution.
  2. A provision reflecting the pluralistic nature of Bangladeshi society should be added to the constitution. Therefore, the commission recommends incorporating the following provision: "Bangladesh is a pluralistic, multi-nation, multi-religion, multi-language, and multi-cultural country where the coexistence and proper dignity of all communities will be ensured."
6. Principles of the State: The commission recommends removing secularism, socialism, and nationalism as fundamental principles of the state, along with Articles 8, 9, 10, and 12 of the constitution related to these principles.

=== Fundamental Rights and Freedoms ===
1. The commission has reviewed the articles related to rights in the constitution and made several recommendations. It is proposed to integrate the rights under Parts II and III of the existing constitution into a single charter titled "Fundamental Rights and Freedoms", which will be enforceable in courts and eliminate disparities between economic, social, cultural rights, and civil, political rights.
2. The commission recommends including some new rights in the constitution, such as the right to food, education, healthcare, housing, internet access, information, voting, participation in state governance, privacy protection, consumer protection, children's rights, development, science, and the rights of future generations.
3. Reforms to existing articles on rights have been proposed, such as expanding the limited list of prohibited discriminations, ensuring protection against extrajudicial killings and enforced disappearances to safeguard the right to life, including the right to bail, and repealing provisions related to preventive detention.
4. Instead of imposing separate limits for each fundamental right, it is proposed to establish a general limit with provisions for balancing and proportionality tests, which would reduce the risk of rights infringement.
5. For rights requiring significant resources and time for implementation (e.g., education, health, food, housing), it is recommended to implement them progressively based on resource availability, ensuring accountability and effective realization according to available resources.

=== Legislature ===
- The Commission recommends a bicameral legislature: a lower house Jatiya Sangsad (National Assembly) and an upper house (Senate of Bangladesh). Both houses will have a tenure of 4 (four) years.

==== Lower House ====
1. The lower house will consist of members directly elected by majority vote. It will have 400 (four hundred) seats. Among them, 300 (three hundred) members will be elected through direct voting from single regional constituencies. Another 100 female members will be elected directly from 100 (one hundred) constituencies designated across all districts of the country, with competition limited to female candidates.
2. Political parties will nominate candidates from young men and women for at least 10% of the total seats in the lower house.
3. The minimum age for contesting parliamentary elections will be reduced to 21 years.
4. There will be 2 (two) deputy speakers, one of whom will be nominated from the opposition party.
5. A member of parliament will not hold more than one of the following positions simultaneously: (a) Prime Minister, (b) Leader of Parliament, and (c) Head of a political party.
6. Except for financial bills, members of the lower house will have full authority to vote against their nominating party.
7. Permanent committees of the legislature will always have their chairs nominated from opposition members.

==== Upper House ====
1. The upper house will consist of 105 (one hundred five) members. Among them, 100 members will be determined proportionally based on the total votes received in the national elections. Political parties can nominate up to 100 (one hundred) candidates for the upper house based on the proportional representation (PR) system. Among these candidates, at least 5 must represent socially and economically disadvantaged communities as determined by law. The remaining 5 seats will be filled by the President, who will nominate candidates from among citizens (who are not members of any house or political party).
2. To qualify for representation in the upper house through the proportional representation (PR) system, a political party must secure at least 1% of the votes cast in the national elections.
3. The speaker of the upper house will be elected by a simple majority from among the members of the upper house.
4. There will be one deputy speaker in the upper house, who will be elected from among all members except those from the ruling party.

==== Constitutional Amendments ====
1. Any constitutional amendment will require the approval of a two-thirds majority in both houses. Once the proposed amendment is passed in both houses, it will be presented in a referendum. The referendum's outcome will be determined by a simple majority.

==== International Treaties ====
- Any international treaty affecting national interests or state security must be approved by a majority vote in both houses of the legislature before execution.

==== Impeachment ====
- The President can be impeached for treason, gross misconduct, or violation of the Constitution. After the lower house passes the impeachment motion, it will be sent to the upper house, where the impeachment process will be completed through a hearing.

=== Executive Branch ===
1. The Commission recommends that the member who enjoys the majority support of the members in the lower house of the legislature should form the government. Executive authority in the republic will be exercised by the Cabinet led by the Prime Minister.
2. The Commission recommends certain specific responsibilities for the President; apart from these special functions or matters mentioned in the Constitution, the President will act on the advice of the Prime Minister.
3. The Commission recommends the establishment of a National Constitutional Council (NCC) to bring transparency and accountability in state affairs and to ensure balance among state organs and institutions.

==== National Constitutional Council ====
1. The National Constitutional Council (NCC) is a national institution composed of representatives from the three branches of the state. Members of the NCC will include:
  1. President
  2. Prime Minister
  3. Leader of the Opposition
  4. Speaker of the Lower House
  5. Speaker of the Upper House
  6. Chief Justice of Bangladesh
  7. Deputy Speaker of the Lower House nominated by the Opposition
  8. Deputy Speaker of the Upper House nominated by the Opposition
  9. One member nominated from among the remaining members of both houses of the legislature (excluding members representing the political parties of the Prime Minister and the Leader of the Opposition) by majority vote of the members of both houses. This vote must be held within seven (7) working days from the date of formation of both houses of the legislature. In the case of a coalition government, members of coalition parties other than the party represented by the Prime Minister will be eligible to vote in this nomination.
2. Even if the legislature is dissolved, the existing NCC members will remain active until the Chief Adviser of the interim government is sworn in. During the absence of a legislature, the members of the NCC will be:
  1. President
  2. Chief Adviser
  3. Chief Justice of Bangladesh
  4. Two members of the Advisory Council nominated by the Chief Adviser

3. The NCC will submit names to the President for appointment to the following positions:

1. The Chief Election Commissioner and other Election Commissioners
2. The Attorney General and Additional Attorney Generals
3. The chairperson and other Commissioners of the Public Service Commission
4. The chairperson and other Commissioners of the Anti-Corruption Commission
5. The Chairperson and other Commissioners of the Human Rights Commission
6. The Chief Local Government Commission and other Commissioners
7. The Chief of Defence Forces
8. Any other positions prescribed by law

==== President ====
1. The President's term will be four (4) years. The President may not hold office more than twice.
2. The President will be elected by a majority vote of the Electoral college. The Electoral College will comprise the following voters:
  1. One vote per member of both houses of the legislature.
  2. Each District Coordination Council collectively having one vote (e.g. if there are 64 District coordination councils, there will be 64 votes).
  3. Each City Corporation Coordination Council collectively having one vote.
3. The President can be impeached for treason, gross misconduct, or violation of the Constitution. The impeachment motion will begin in the lower house.

==== Prime Minister ====
1. The Prime Minister will be appointed with the support of the majority of members in the lower house of the legislature.
2. If at any time before the expiration of the legislature's term the Prime Minister resigns voluntarily, loses a vote of confidence, or advises the President to dissolve the legislature for any other reason, and if it is clear to the President that no other member of the lower house can secure the majority support needed to form a government, then the President will dissolve both houses of the legislature.
3. An individual may serve as Prime Minister for a maximum of two terms. This provision will apply equally regardless of whether the person holds the position consecutively or otherwise. While serving as Prime Minister, the individual may not hold the position of party chief or leader of the legislature.

==== Interim Government ====
1. The commission recommends appointing an interim government after the term of the legislature ends or the legislature is dissolved, and until the next elected government takes oath;
2. The head of the interim government will be referred to as the 'Chief Adviser.' The decision to appoint the Chief Adviser must be finalized within 15 (fifteen) days prior to the end of the legislature's term or within 15 (fifteen) days after the legislature is dissolved. The Chief Adviser will operate through an advisory council comprising a maximum of 15 (fifteen) members.
3. The term of the interim government will be a maximum of 90 (ninety) days, but if the election is held earlier, the term of this government will end as soon as the Prime Minister of the new government takes oath.
4. Chief Adviser
  The commission recommends that the Chief Adviser of the interim government be appointed as follows, in the given sequential order:
  1. From among individuals eligible to be members of the legislature, one acceptable person who is not a member of the NCC will be appointed as Chief Adviser by the decision of at least 7 (seven) of the 9 (nine) members of the NCC.
  2. If a decision cannot be made under subsection 4.1 above, one acceptable person from among all retired Chief Justices and retired judges of the Appellate Division will be appointed as Chief Adviser by the decision of at least 6 (six) of the 9 (nine) members of the NCC.
  3. If a decision cannot be made under subsection 4.2 above, the President will assume the additional responsibility of Chief Adviser by the unanimous decision of all members of the NCC.
  4. If the NCC cannot reach a unanimous decision under subsection 4.3 above, the most recently retired Chief Justice of Bangladesh will become the Chief Adviser.
  5. If the most recently retired Chief Justice as per subsection 4.4 above cannot be found or declines to be the Chief Adviser, then the Chief Justice who retired immediately prior to them will become the Chief Adviser. Similarly, if they are also unavailable or unwilling, the process will continue in sequential order with the Chief Justice who retired immediately before them.
  6. If no retired Chief Justice can be found or they decline to be the Chief Adviser as per subsection 4.5 above, the most recently retired judge of the Appellate Division will become the Chief Adviser.
  7. If the most recently retired judge of the Appellate Division as per subsection 4.6 above cannot be found or declines to be the Chief Adviser, then the judge who retired immediately prior to them will become the Chief Adviser. Similarly, if they are also unavailable or unwilling, the process will continue in sequential order with the judge who retired immediately before them.

=== Judiciary ===
Supreme Court

1. The commission recommends decentralizing the higher judiciary by establishing permanent High Court benches with equal jurisdiction in all divisions of the country. The seat of the Appellate Division of the Supreme Court will remain in the capital.
2. A Judicial Appointments Commission (JAC) will be formed for appointing judges to the Supreme Court. Its members will include the Chief Justice (ex-officio as the head of the commission); the next two senior judges of the Appellate Division (ex-officio members); the two senior-most judges of the High Court Division (ex-officio members); the Attorney General, and one citizen nominated by the upper house of Parliament.
3. The commission proposes that in addition to appropriate knowledge and skills, integrity and honesty be made prerequisites for becoming a judge of the Supreme Court
4. A provision should be included in the constitution institutionalizing the appointment of the senior-most judge among the Appellate Division judges as the Chief Justice.
5. The Supreme Judicial Council will remain in place. The authority to refer complaints for investigation and inquiry to the Supreme Judicial Council will rest with the head of state as well as the National Constitutional Council (NCC).
6. The commission recommends granting full financial independence to the judiciary.
7. Subordinate Courts
  1. The commission proposes replacing the term 'subordinate courts' with 'local courts'.
  2. The commission recommends that all matters related to the appointment, posting, promotion, leave, and discipline of judicial officers in local courts be vested with the Supreme Court. For this purpose, the commission recommends establishing a Judicial Secretariat under the supervision of the Supreme Court. This Judicial Secretariat will have full control over administrative activities, budget preparation, and human resource management of the Supreme Court and local courts, financed through a consolidated fund.

=== Local Government ===
1. The Commission recommends ensuring full functional autonomy in financial management and all tasks prescribed by law for all Local Government Institutions ("LGI"). Unless it is part of a national implementation program, local government institutions (LGIs) will have full financial control and authority to implement all development works at the local level.
2. The Commission recommends that all government officers and employees directly engaged in the work of LGIs should be subordinate to the elected representatives of LGIs. Additionally, all government departments involved in implementing development projects within LGI jurisdictions should work under the direction of LGI representatives.
3. LGIs will be able to locally raise their own funds. If the estimated funds are expected to be less than the LGI budget, the budget must be submitted to the Local Government Committee of the upper house of the legislature. Once the budget is approved by the Local Government Committee of the upper house of the legislature, the committee will instruct the concerned ministry to allocate the deficit mentioned in the budget within 15 (fifteen) working days.
4. The Commission recommends the establishment of a "District Coordination Council" in each district to coordinate activities and act as a joint performance agency for all LGIs in that district. Its members will include:
  1. Chairpersons and two Vice Chairpersons elected from each Upazila Parishad.
  2. Mayors and two Deputy Mayors elected from each Municipality.
  3. Chairpersons elected from each Union council. City Corporations will have their own Coordination councils.
5. The Commission recommends that all LGI elections be held under the direct supervision of the Election Commission.
6. The Reform Commission recommends the establishment of a Local Government Commission, which will comprise a Chief Local Government Commissioner and 4 (four) Commissioners.

=== Permanent Attorney Service ===
1. The Commission recommends the establishment of a Permanent Attorney Service under the Constitution.

=== Constitutional Commissions ===
The CRC recommends creating a section in the Constitution of Bangladesh for the following five Constitutional Commissions, with each Commission having a dedicated chapter. These commissions are:

1. Human Rights Commission
2. Election Commission
3. Public Service Commission
4. Local Government Commission
5. Anti-Corruption Commission

The CRC recommends that the formation, appointment terms, and removal procedures for all these commissions should be uniform. Each commission will have a tenure of 4 (four) years.

=== Miscellaneous ===
1. The Commission recommends repealing Article 150(2) of the Constitution and not including the associated 5th, 6th, and 7th Schedules in the Constitution.
2. Provisions for Emergency:
  The Commission recommends that only upon the decision of the NCC, the President will have the authority to declare a state of emergency. The Commission believes that during an emergency, no citizen rights should be revoked or suspended, and the right to seek redress in court should not be blocked or suspended. Therefore, the Commission recommends repealing Articles 141(b) and 141(c).

== Public reception ==
Several organizations and political parties, including the Rastro Sangskar Andolon and the Gonoparishad Andolon, (Note: Gonoparishad Andolon (Bengali: গণপরিষদ আন্দোলন) literally means "Constituent Assembly Movement".) have long campaigned to convene a constituent assembly for the reform or drafting of a new constitution. One of the founding objective of the Jatiya Nagorik Committee is to help the government to convene a constituent assembly.

The commission has been criticized for not having enough Millennial and Gen Z representation because 65% of Bangladesh's population is aged under 35. Umran Chowdhury said:

Millennials and Gen Z have a greater stake in the constitution-reform process than any other generation. This is about our future, our hopes and aspirations, our dreams, our families, our country. We know better and perhaps best than anyone what we want for our country's future. We are a diverse, democratic, argumentative and competitive lot. We include the self-made, the inherited, the dynasty's, the hard working, the easy going, and the visionaries.

According to legal historian Cynthia Farid:

Any national design needs to connect past, present and future generations, including the dead, the old, the youths on the streets today, and the unborn. Calls for a new constitution may not rid the nation of the dangers it has faced in the past, like concentration of power in the executive branch or settling debates over politics, equality and religion.

Writing in The Daily Star, Zia Haider Rahman and Manzoor Hasan said that the government should adopt an hourglass model for drafting a new constitution that starts with "broad public and civil society input, narrows to a deliberating and drafting body, and then re-engages the public through a constitutional assembly, referendum, or both, followed by ratification". They also emphasized that public engagement must be substantive, not superficial.

An article in the Dhaka Tribune by Umran Chowdhury said:

Given that there is no parliament at the moment, no commission has the authority to change the constitution. This can only be done with an elected parliament in place.

Chowdhury identified three pathways to reform the constitution:

The traditional pathway: the next parliament, which shall be the 13th parliament, will be elected in a regular general election. With a two third majority, the next parliament will amend the Constitution in line with Article 142. A potential referendum can be held to gain the public’s approval before changing the basic features of the Constitution. This pathway looks most likely at present. But will these changes go far enough? Will the "People’s Republic" be changed to just "Republic" or "Bangladeshi Republic" or "Sovereign State of Bangladesh"?

The hybrid pathway: Bangladesh can find its own unique way to renew its Constitution by preserving the document but convening a special parliament to discuss changes to the Constitution. This would be a parliament with a 1-2 year tenure which would be akin to a Constituent Assembly but preserves the sanctity of the Constitution. The public’s approval should be gained through a referendum once reforms have been planned and adopted by this special parliament. Political parties will have to nominate candidates for this special parliament, who will be elected at the polls. Given that the BNP has proposed an upper house of parliament, candidates for a special parliament can also be laterally appointed.

The new constitutional pathway: this can be the hardest route, with a constituent assembly elected to draft an entirely new constitution and usher in a second republic. There are many uncertainties about this pathway.

Farhad Mazhar said:

In every meeting I attend, everyone is saying—we need a new constitution. We don't want constitutional reforms. The idea, aspiration, and intent for a new constitution have taken root among the people.

Former Comptroller and Auditor General Mohammad Muslim Chowdhury said:

Our current constitution contains several elements that can lead to authoritarianism. These elements were present even in the 1972 constitution. Later, through amendments, more such elements were added. The uprising in the 1990s was led by political parties. In 1990, the responsibility for amending the constitution was left in the hands of political parties. This time, that cannot be allowed. This uprising is of the students and the people. We must seize the opportunity that has come at the cost of their blood.

On 4 August 2024, a day before the Resignation of Sheikh Hasina, Anu Muhammad, on behalf of the University Teachers' Network, Bangladesh, proposed convening a constituent assembly for drafting a new constitution.

Form a constitutional assembly within six months to draft a democratic constitution free from discriminatory, communal, and inequitable provisions. The assembly will propose a constitutional reform to eradicate the autocratic, communal, anti-people and discriminatory clauses.

Separately, Rifat Hasan argued in several September and October events that, the current constitution has lost its ethical authority to its citizens, particularly in the aftermath of the uprising, making it necessary to adopt a new one. He has suggested forming an all-party "guardian council" to ensure broad participation in the drafting and adopting process. According to his suggestion, this council would draft the constitution and, after approval, present it for adoption via a referendum. Hasan also highlighted that the new constitution should be viewed as a political instrument representing the people's sovereign will, rather than a sacred text, and should establish a clear social contract to define the state's foundation.

Umran Chowdhury argued:

The Constitution of Bangladesh remains the best source of principles to steer the nation at this profoundly historic juncture. Bangladesh has witnessed a popular revolution led by the Students Against Discrimination. There have been calls for a referendum under Article 119(2) of the Constitution. [...] The interim government should use the existing provisions of the Constitution, including provisions created after liberation in 1972, to implement reforms, overturn decisions of the previous government, and guide the nation towards a new social contract. [...] The importance of consultation and consensus with political stakeholders is crucial. In the Islamic faith, consultation is an article of faith in the governance of a community. [...] During the fifth parliament in 1991, an All Party Select Committee reached consensus to enact the 11th and 12th amendments to the Constitution. The 11th amendment validated the actions of Justice Shahabuddin Ahmed’s caretaker government. The 12th amendment reintroduced the parliamentary system and ended the presidential system. [...] Given the exceptional circumstances we are in, the outcome of this transitional process should be validated through a referendum. As a nation, we have been given a rare opportunity to shape our democratic future.

Sara Hossain noted that creating a new constitution would be far more challenging than amending the existing one, but supported fundamental rights like freedom of speech and freedom of expression to criticise the constitution.

== See also ==
- Criticism of the Constitution of Bangladesh
- 2024 Bangladesh constitutional crisis
- 2026 Bangladeshi general election
- Interim government of Muhammad Yunus
- Women's Affairs Reform Commission
