= 2024 Bangladesh constitutional crisis =

Constitutional crisis in Bangladesh

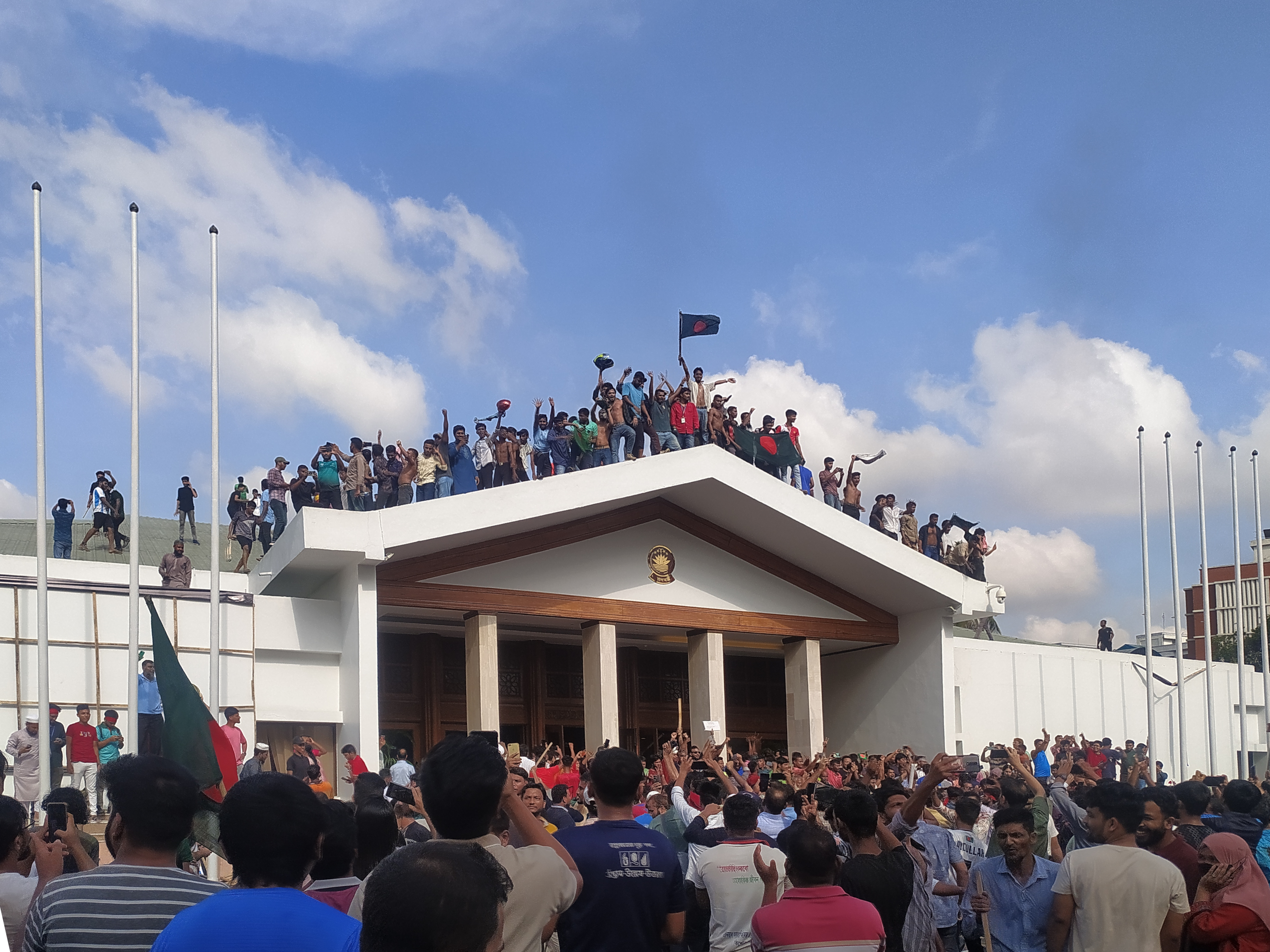
People cheering in front of the Prime Minister's Office after Sheikh Hasina's resignation

A constitutional crisis emerged in Bangladesh on 5 August 2024, after the prime minister, Sheikh Hasina, resigned and exile to India as protesters stormed her residence and office in Dhaka during the Non-cooperation movement. Hasina's flight to India triggered the constitutional crisis because the existing constitution had no provisions for an interim government or any other form of government in the event that the prime minister resigns and the parliament is dissolved. Although Article 123 of the constitution mandated general elections within 90 days following the dissolution of parliament, no clear guidelines existed for the powers and structure of an interim government.

Several days after Hasina's departure, her son, Sajeeb Wazed, claimed she remained the incumbent prime minister of Bangladesh, as she had not signed a resignation letter.

My mother never officially resigned. She didn’t get the time.... As far as the constitution goes, she is still the prime minister.

— Sajeeb Wazed to Reuters

Three days after her flight, an interim government was formed, with Muhammad Yunus sworn in as chief adviser. Following the oath-taking of the interim government, formed a Constitutional Reform Commission and National Consensus Commission to prepare a roadmap for the next general election and constitutional referendum on the July Charter alongside the election.

== Reactions ==
In October 2024, during a conversation with Manab Zamin's Chief Editor, Matiur Rahman Chowdhury, the President Mohammed Shahabuddin, quoted that,

"I tried to collect the resignation letter many times but failed. Maybe she did not get the time. When things came under control, one day the cabinet secretary came to collect the copy of the resignation letter. I told him that I too am looking for it."

Citing concerns over the resignation of Sheikh Hasina as Prime Minister, and the legality of the interim government as per the existing constitution.

Following the remarks, protests erupted across the country calling for his resignation as the president. Adviser for Law, Justice and Parliamentary Affairs, Asif Nazrul stated that,

"The president's statement that he did not receive Sheikh Hasina's resignation letter is a lie, and it is a violation of his oath."

The Chief Adviser's Deputy Press Secretary, Apurba Jahangir, during a press briefing at the Foreign Service Academy agreed with Law advisers views and quoted,

"The government also agrees that by lying about the letter, the president has violated his oath"

Asif Mahmud, Adviser for Youth and Sports and Labor and Employment, posted on Facebook stating,

"Prime Minister Sheikh Hasina had verbally communicated her resignation to the President". While she was initially expected to deliver a formal resignation letter at Bangabhaban, the approach of protesters near Ganabhaban reportedly necessitated her departure from the location."

He questioned the implications of the resignation occurring under these circumstances.

During a roundtable discussion organized by Islami Andolan Bangladesh in Segunbagicha, Sarjis Alam, one of the coordinator of Students Against Discrimination quoted,

"If a person like President Mohammed Shahabuddin says that he does not have the documents of Sheikh Hasina's resignation, then it will be up to the student community to decide what action should be taken against him."

Another coordinator, Hasnat Abdullah, also posted on social media stating,

"Awami League as a party should face justice, a new constitution should be written, corrupt Awami bureaucrats should be sacked, all illegal agreements made during Hasina's tenure should be cancelled, and Chuppu (President) should be removed from the post of president immediately."

Nasiruddin Patwary, convener of the Jatiya Nagorik Committee, also criticised President by saying,

"Chuppu (President) is part of the fascist regime. He has no right to remain as president, and we will not allow any element of this regime to persist after the mass uprising."

== See also ==
- Constitution of Bangladesh
- Constitutional Reform Commission
- 2006–2008 Bangladeshi political crisis
