= Nirupa Dewan =

Nirupa Dewan is an indigenous rights activist and member of the Women Affairs Reform Commission of the Muhammad Yunus led interim government. former commissioner of the National Human Rights Commission of Bangladesh. She is a member of the CHT Nagorik Committee. She is a member of the governing body of the Manusher Jonno Foundation.

== Early life ==
Dewan was born to Suprava Dewan and Pravat Ranjan Dewan. She established the Moanoghar Supravat Memorial Scholarship with her brother Robin Dewan in memory of their parents. She graduated from Aparnacharan City Corporation Girls' High School and College in 1968 and Chittagong College in 1970. She finished a Bachelor of Arts at Chittagong College in 1973. She completed a B.Ed. and M.Ed. at the Government Teachers' Training College, Dhaka in 1978 and 1991 respectively.

== Career ==
Dewan joined the Rangamati Government Girls' High School in 2005 and retired as the principal in 2009.

On 24 June 2010, President Zillur Rahman appointed Dewan member of the National Human Rights Commission replacing Professor Giasuddin Molla. Mollah had been terminated after his appointment following an allegation of sexual harassment from a student at the University of Dhaka, where he taught.

Dewan participated in a human chain demanding the full implementation of the Chittagong Hill Tracts Peace Accord in 2013. She visited Banshkhali Upazilaafter the 2013 Bangladesh anti-Hindu violence by Bangladesh Jamaat e Islami. The violence started after the International Crimes Tribunal sentenced Delwar Hossain Sayeedi to death for war crimes during the Bangladesh Liberation War. She demanded an investigation into the attack on the Chakma queen, Rani Yan Yan, by security forces after she went to visit two Marma sisters raped by security personnel. In 2019, she received the IPDC-Prothom-alo Priyo Shikkhok Shommanona Award from Prothom Alo and IPDC Finance Limited.

Following the fall of the Sheikh Hasina-led Awami League government, Dewan met with the chief advisor Muhammad Yunus of the interim government at Jamuna State Guest House along with other women leaders. She was included in a Women Affairs Reform Commission established by the new regime. She attended a meeting of the Constitutional Reform Commission led by Professor Ali Riaz in November 2024.

Dewan is the vice president of Moanoghar, a non-profit founded by Buddhist monks for development work in the Chittagong Hill Tracts. Regarding the Kuki-Chin National Front she said, “Even a child could say who are behind the KNF, especially after watching their activities. Such groups work to destroy the main spirit of peace accord. And a powerful clique has been fanning them from behind. But this is nothing new in the hills. The government should never entertain them.”
