= Ekramul Haque =

Ekramul Haque might refer to:

- Muhammad Ekramul Haque, Bangladeshi lawyer and academic
- Killing of Ekramul Haque, killing of a Bangladeshi councillor
- Ekramul Haque Titu, Bangladeshi politician
