= Jesmin Tuli =

Member, Election System Reform Commission

Personal details
- Occupation: Civil servant

Jesmin Tuli is a Bangladeshi civil servant and former member of the Election Reform Commission of the Yunus ministry. She previously served as an additional secretary in the Bangladesh Election Commission.

== Early life ==
Tuli finished her master's in 1979 at the University of Dhaka.

== Career ==
In 2010, Tuli served as Returning Officer for the Chittagong City Corporation election, where she was noted for maintaining control amid political tensions and emphasising adherence to electoral laws. She was reported to be the first female Election Commission official to serve as a returning officer in a city corporation election in Bangladesh and highlighted the importance of transparency and neutrality in the electoral process. In 2014, as returning officer she cancelled the nomination of Sabiha Nahar, Awami League candidate, and Khorshed Ara Haqu, Jatiya Party candidate, due to having outstanding phone bills.

Tuli served as an additional secretary in the Government of Bangladesh. After the fall of the Sheikh Hasina-led Awami League government, she was appointed to the Election Reform Commission.

In November 2024, Tuli was named as an accused in a case filed over alleged attempts to murder during protests associated with the Students' Against Discrimination movement that led to the fall of the Sheikh Hasina-led Awami League government. The case, filed at the Chief Metropolitan Magistrate's Court in Dhaka, included multiple current and former officials and political figures. Legal experts cited in the report questioned the case's basis and described it as potentially harassing.

In January 2026, Tuli stated that many key recommendations of the Electoral Reform Commission had not been implemented and that no major reforms had taken place in Bangladesh's electoral system. She also expressed concerns over continued violations of electoral laws, weak enforcement by authorities, and the lack of an environment in which voters could feel safe during elections.
