= Mohammad Harun Chowdhury =

Bangladeshi civil servant (born 1952)

Mohammad Harun Chowdhury is a retired Secretary of Government of Bangladesh and member of the Police Reform Commission of the Muhammad Yunus-led Interim government.

== Early life ==
Chowdhury was born in September 1952 in Sultanpur village, Raozan Upazila, Chittagong District, East Pakistan, Pakistan. He graduated from Karnafuli Project High School and Chittagong College in 1969 and 1972 respectively. He did his bachelor's degree and master's in economics at the University of Dhaka in 1976 and 1977 respectively. He has a postgraduate diploma from the International Institute for Population Sciences.

== Career ==
Chowdhury joined the Bangladesh Muktijoddha Kalyan Trust after completing his studies. He worked at the Bangladesh Planning Commission. From 1978 to 1982, he worked at the Bangladesh Academy for Rural Development. He joined the 1982 'Special Batch' of the Bangladesh Civil Service.

Chowdhury served as Additional Deputy Commissioner of Manikganj District and later worked at Economic Relations Division under Ministry of Finance. Later Chowdhury served as the District commissioner of Panchagarh District and Sylhet District in the early 2000s. In 2005, he was promoted to Joint Secretary and appointed to the Ministry of Home Affairs. He was the Member Directing Staff of the Bangladesh Public Administration Training Center. In 2007, he was the Divisional Commissioner of Barisal Division. In January 2009, he was promoted as Secretary and posted to Ministry of Public Administration. He retired from civil service in the end of 2009.

Chowdhury was appointed as member of the Police Reform Commission in October 2024. The commission was led by Safar Raj Hossain. The commission considered new policies, uniforms and monogram for Bangladesh Police. The reform commission also recommended not to consider political identity in police recruitment.
