= Adviser (interim or caretaker government of Bangladesh) =

Head of a ministry in interim and caretaker governments of Bangladesh

Adviser of the People's Republic of Bangladesh
- গণপ্রজাতন্ত্রী বাংলাদেশ সরকারের উপদেষ্টা
- Government Seal of Bangladesh
- Style: Mr. Adviser (informal); The Honorable (formal); His Excellency (diplomatic)
- Appointer: President of Bangladesh
- Term length: Until the next general election is held and a new Prime Minister takes office
- Formation: 1996

Adviser (Bengali: উপদেষ্টা), also spelt Advisor, (Note: In American English) refers to a government official who oversees one or more government ministries in the interim and caretaker government systems of Bangladesh. An adviser has the status equivalent to the Minister of an elected government. During an interim government, several advisers and the Chief Adviser forms the cabinet instead of Prime Minister and ministers. Usually people who serves as adviser in an interim government in Bangladesh are politically nonpartisan.

== See also ==
- Chief Adviser of Bangladesh
- Cabinet of Bangladesh
- Interim government system of Bangladesh
- Caretaker government of Bangladesh
