= Imran Siddique =

Imran Siddique, also spelled Imran Siddiq, is a Bangladeshi lawyer and member of the Constitutional Reform Commission. He is a former defence lawyer at the International Crimes Tribunal. He was the defence lawyer of Bangladesh Jamaat-e-Islami politicians Ghulam Azam and Delawar Hossain Sayedee who were charged with committing war crimes during the Bangladesh Liberation War.

== Early life ==
Siddique did his bachelor of law at the London School of Economics. He did another bachelors in international relations at the University of London. He did his masters in law at the Nottingham Trent University.

== Career ==
In 2004, Siddique was called to bar by Gray's Inn. he joined the Bangladesh Bar Council in 2005.

In 2012 and 2013, Siddique was working as the defence counsel of Ghulam Azam at the International Crimes Tribunal. Azam, former Ameer of the Bangladesh Jamaat-e-Islami, had been charged with war crimes for his role during the Bangladesh Liberation War while Barrister Tureen Afroz was the public prosecutor. He co-defenders were Ehsan Siddique, and Shishir Monir. He worked as the defence lawyer of Delawar Hossain Sayedee in 2014.

Siddique filed a petition challenging the legality of the Section 57 of the Information and Communication Technology Act, 2006 in 2015.

Siddique is a partner at The Law Counsel, which he joined in 2004. He is a founding trustee board member of the Centre for Law, Governance, and Policy. Siddique fought a legal case to ensure madrassah students have access to higher education in Bangladesh. He has represented Biman Bangladesh Airlines, Chittagong Development Authority, Civil Aviation Authority of Bangladesh, Meghna Group of Industries, National Board of Revenue and the National Curriculum and Textbook Board. He is a member of the Bangladesh Supreme Court Bar Association.

Following the fall of the Sheikh Hasina led Awami League government, Siddique was made a member of the Constitutional Reform Commission. The Commission is led by Ali Riaz. The Constitution Reform Commission submitted its report in January 2025, recommending that equity, human dignity, pluralism, and social justice replace nationalism, secularism, and socialism.
