= Quazi Mahfujul Haque Supan =

Associate professor of law

Quazi Mahfujul Haque Supan is an associate professor of law at the University of Dhaka and a member of the Justice Division Reform Commission of the Muhammad Yunus-led Interim government. Supan is a faculty member of the law school at the East West University and the Shanto-Mariam University of Creative Technology. He also teaches at the State University of Bangladesh, Northern University, Bangladesh, University of Asia Pacific, and Eastern University.

== Early life ==
Supan completed his bachelor's and master's degrees in law at the University of Dhaka in 1993 and 1994, respectively.

== Career ==
Supan was a member of a "people's probe body" led by Anu Muhammad to investigate medical college entrance question paper leaks in 2015.

In July 2019, Supan trained officers of the Anti-Corruption Commission in a training session organized by Transparency International Bangladesh.

Supan is a faculty member of the law school at the East West University and the Shanto-Mariam University of Creative Technology. He also teaches at the State University of Bangladesh, Northern University, Bangladesh, University of Asia Pacific, and Eastern University. He has been critical of the proposed Cyber Security Rules 2024.

After the fall of the Sheikh Hasina led Awami League government, Supan was appointed a member of the Justice Division Reform Commission of the Muhmmad Yunus led Interim government. The Judicial Reform Commission recommended creating an entirely independent judicial system and an merit based attorney service. The commission also established a website to solicit ideas.

He was appointed head of a committee of the University of Dhaka to investigate violence on campus from 15 July to 5 August during the 2024 Bangladesh quota reform movement. The committee included Professors Mohammad Ekramul Haque, Nadia Newaz Rimi, Mohammed Almujaddade Alfasane, Nasreen Sultana, and Shehreen Amin Bhuiyan. The Committee recommended the expulsion of 128 students for participating in the violence, but critics argued that many more students participated in the violence.
