= Mahbubur Rahman (academic) =

Muhammad Mahbubur Rahman
- মুহাম্মদ মাহবুবুর রহমান
- Born: Bangladesh
- Education: University of Dhaka, SOAS University of London, NALSAR University of Law
- Occupations: Professor, Legal Scholar
- Years active: 2006–present
- Known for: Criminal law, legal theory, human rights

Muhammad Mahbubur Rahman is a Bangladeshi legal scholar, professor in the Department of Law at the University of Dhaka, and member of the Anti-Corruption Commission reform commission of the Muhammad Yunus led interim government.

== Early life and education ==
Rahman completed his Secondary School Certificate from Sena Palli High School in 1994 and his Higher Secondary Certificate from Dhaka College in 1996. He pursued legal studies at the University of Dhaka, obtaining a Bachelor of Laws in 2000 and a Master of Laws in 2001. He later earned a Post-Graduate Diploma in International Humanitarian Law from NALSAR University of Law in 2009. Rahman completed his Ph.D. in criminal law from the School of Oriental and African Studies (SOAS), University of London.

== Career ==
Rahman began his academic career in May 2004 as a Lecturer in the Department of Law at Northern University, Bangladesh. In September 2006, he joined the Department of Law at the University of Dhaka as a lecturer. His research interests include criminal law, legal theory, human rights, and law and society.

Rahman is an elected member of the Executive Council of the Asian Society of International Law and serves as the Treasurer of the Bangladesh Chapter of the organization. He is also a Life Trustee of the AsianSIL Bangladesh Trust and a member of the Bangladesh Law Association. Furthermore, he is a member of the Ethical Review Committee at the International Centre for Diarrhoeal Disease Research, Bangladesh.

In May 2019, Rahman was promoted to full professor at the University of Dhaka. Between 2021 and 2022, he was a member of the National Inquiry Committee on Violence Against Women and Children and Rape under the National Human Rights Commission of Bangladesh. He is a lecturer and head of the department of law at Independent University, Bangladesh. He also teaches law at Dhaka International University.

Following the fall of the Sheikh Hasina led Awami League government, Rahman was made a member of the Anti-Corruption Commission reform commission of the Muhammad Yunus led interim government.
