= Apurba Jahangir =

Bangladeshi journalist and writer

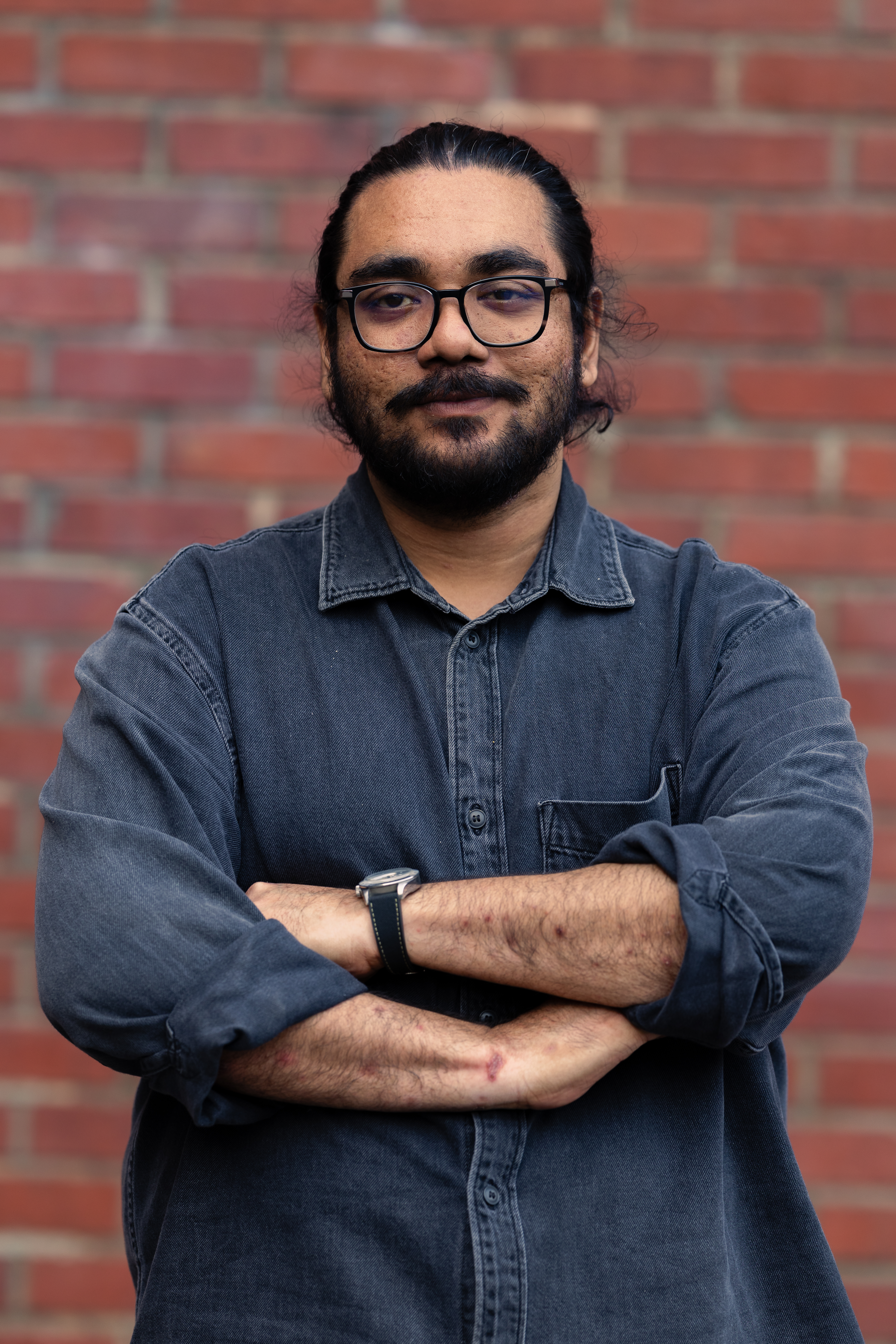
- Jahangir in 2024

Deputy Press Secretary to the Chief Adviser
- In office 13 August 2024 – 17 February 2026
- Chief Adviser: Muhammad Yunus

Personal details
- Born: Bangladesh
- Relatives: Muhammad Yunus (uncle); Muhammad Ibrahim (uncle)
- Occupation: Journalist

Apurba Jahangir is a Bangladeshi journalist, writer, filmmaker, musician, and communication consultant. He served as a deputy press secretary to the chief adviser Muhammad Yunus. He is the nephew of Nobel Laureate Muhammad Yunus.

== Early life and education ==
Born in Dhaka, Apurba was raised in a media-rich environment. Jahangir was born to a renowned journalist and media personality, Muhammad Jahangir, who was executive director of the Centre for Development Communication and younger brother of Muhammad Yunus. Apurba completed a degree in media and communication from the University of Liberal Arts Bangladesh (ULAB).

== Career ==
He was the managing director of THE IDEA COMPANY, a creative agency formerly known as 360 ONE. After the fall of the Sheikh Hasina-led Awami League government, Jahangir was appointed deputy press secretary to the chief adviser Muhammad Yunus of the Interim government along with journalist Mohammad Abul Kalam Azad Majumder. He was appointed under Press Secretary Shafiqul Alam. Mohammad A Arafat, former minister of state for information and broadcasting of the Awami League government, criticized the decision to appoint Jahangir and compared it the appointment of other Yunus alleged loyalists to the government such as Nurjahan Begum and Lamiya Morshed.

== Publication and filmmaking ==
Apurba began as a feature writer at The Daily Star at age 17, contributing for seven years. Writes columns for English and Bengali publications, including Dainik Azadi. A collection titled Footnote was published at the 2021 Bangladesh Book Fair. He directed the short documentaries Modhu (about the Dhaka University canteen) and Dhaka An Opera, which premiered virtually in 2020 and screened at national and international festivals, including the Dadasaheb Phalke Film Festival.

=== Music and arts ===
He is a semi-professional guitarist, performing with bands like Elita Alive and Brahmaputra Bangladesh. He is active in visual arts and theatre collaborations, featured at Tara Theatre, Dhaka.
