= Firoz Ahmed =

- ফিরোজ আহমেদ
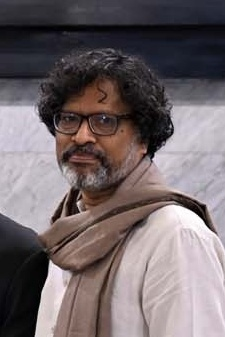
- Born: 1975 (age 50–51); Dhaka, Bangladesh
- Education: University of Dhaka (Faculty of Law)
- Occupations: Researcher, writer, editor
- Spouse: Mahrukh Mohiuddin

Firoz Ahmed (born 1975) is a Bangladeshi researcher, writer, and editor. He is a member of the Constitutional Reform Commission of the Muhammad Yunus led interim government. He is a central leader of the Ganosamhati Andolan.

== Early life and education ==
Ahmed was born in 1975 to M. A. Wazed and Razia Begum. He was raised in various neighborhoods in Dhaka, including Lake Circus Kalabagan, Rayerbazar, Jhigatala, and Uttara. He attended New Model High School and BAF Shaheen College. He studied law at the University of Dhaka.

== Career ==
Ahmed's professional work has largely focused on research, writing, editing, and public presentation. He has contributed to academic and public discourse on legal and constitutional issues in Bangladesh. His review of the constitution-making process of 1972 has been widely referenced. He worked as a civil servant and in the Asian Development Bank. He has been critical of anti-terrorism operations and cooperation with the United States, saying "Islam and terrorism were not uttered before the US economic gloom of 2000 and the global war on terror". Commenting on the arrest of Shafiqul Islam Kajol, a photojournalist, Ahmed said, "Democracy means freedom of the press. Suing journalists or arresting them means you do not want democracy." He co-published Ajob Deshe Alice.

After the fall of the Sheikh Hasina led Awami League government, Ahmed was appointed member of the member of the Constitutional Reform Commission of the Muhammad Yunus led interim government. He was critical of the demolition of Bangabandhu Bhaban, the residence of former President Sheikh Mujibur Rahman, which was converted into a museum. He also called on the government to take action against the instigators.

== Personal life ==
Ahmed is married to Mahrukh Mohiuddin, Managing Director of The University Press Limited, a prominent academic publishing house in Bangladesh. She is the daughter of the founder of the University Press Limited, Mohiuddin Ahmed.
