= Resignation of Sheikh Hasina =

2024 resignation of the Prime Minister of Bangladesh

- Part of the Aftermath of the July Uprising
- The moment of Sheikh Hasina's departure after her resignation
- Date: 5 August 2024
- Time: 2:25 pm (BST, UTC+6:00)
- Duration: 3 days (transition)
- Venue: Ganabhaban
- Location: Dhaka, Bangladesh
- Cause: Non-cooperation movement
- Participants: Sheikh Hasina; Sheikh Rehana

On 5 August 2024, at around 2:25 p.m., Sheikh Hasina resigned from her position as the Prime Minister of Bangladesh and fled the country on a helicopter with her sister, Sheikh Rehana, to India, arriving in Delhi via Agartala.

== Background ==
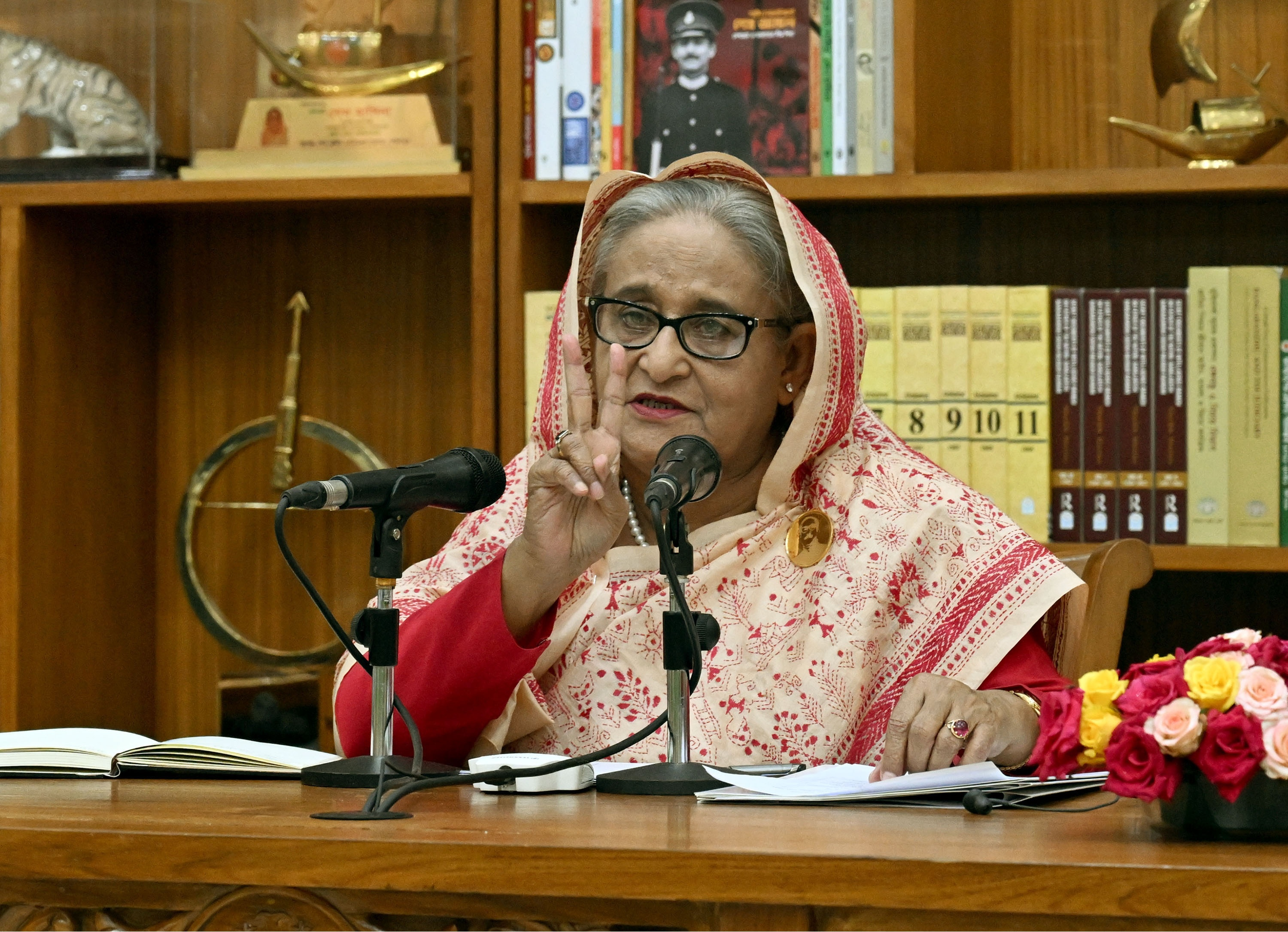
At this press conference on 14 July 2024, Sheikh Hasina linked the quota reform protesters to Razakars, drawing sharp criticism and further escalating the unrest that ultimately culminated in her resignation.

Sheikh Hasina's first term as Prime Minister of Bangladesh began on 23 June 1996, when she took office after her party, the Awami League, secured victory in the general election, succeeding Khaleda Zia of the Bangladesh Nationalist Party (BNP). This initial period lasted until 15 July 2001. She returned to power on 6 January 2009, following a decisive win in the 2008 general election, and subsequently secured re-election in 2014, 2018, and 2024. However, these later elections were widely criticized for lack of transparency, with opposition parties boycotting them and international observers alleging vote manipulation and suppression. Her government was also accused of interfering with the country's judiciary and the judicial system.

By mid-2024, Sheikh Hasina's government was under mounting pressure due to several key factors. Protests, particularly the Quota reform movement, had become a focal point of national discontent, with students and civil society calling for political reforms and a more meritocratic approach to the country's quota system. Despite the initial student protests in 2018, which saw the quota system being outlawed, the Hasina administration were accused of interfering with the country's judiciary to bring the controversial quota system back.

Following months long protests, which saw violent suppression and killings of protesters, Hasina and her administration were given an ultimatum by the lead organisation of protesters, Students Against Discrimination, to resign from office.

They declared that if the government did not step down, the protesters and civil society members would engage in widespread non-cooperation with the state including strikes and civil disobedience.

== Resignation and exile ==
On 3 August 2024, the Students Against Discrimination along with thousands of protesters gathered near the Shaheed Minar, Dhaka and declared a one-point demand for the resignation of Sheikh Hasina and confirmed their intention to march towards Dhaka on 6 August to demand the Prime Minister's resignation. However, the day after, following a heavy death toll of protesters, they announced the "Long march to Dhaka" to be held on 5 August.

On the early hours of 5 August 2024, the protests under the banner of Students Against Discrimination, along with thousands of other demonstrators, intensified their demand for Prime Minister Sheikh Hasina's resignation.

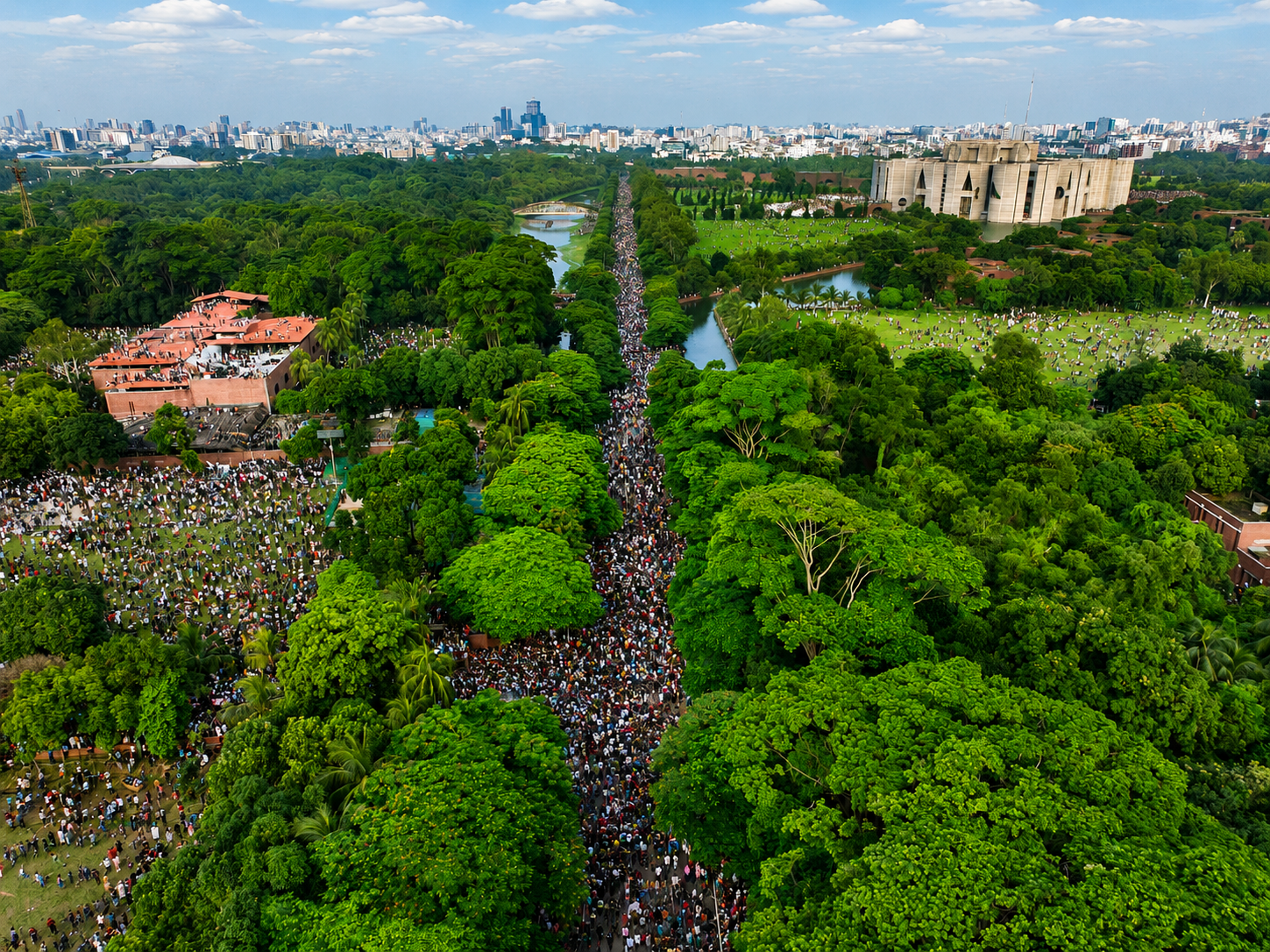
The eastern view of the Lake Road in Dhaka showing the National Parliament Building (upper-right) in the south-east and the Gonobhobon (left) in the north. The Lake Road being filled with an ocean of people on 5th August 2024, Monday.

At around 10:00 AM, groups of protesters, initially from major universities and colleges, gathered near key government buildings, including the Prime Minister's Office, the Jatiya Sangsad Bhaban, and Ganabhaban, the official residence of the Prime Minister. The protesters, chanting slogans and waving banners calling for the end of Hasina's rule, were met by heavy security forces, including riot police and paramilitary units, who attempted to block their advance.

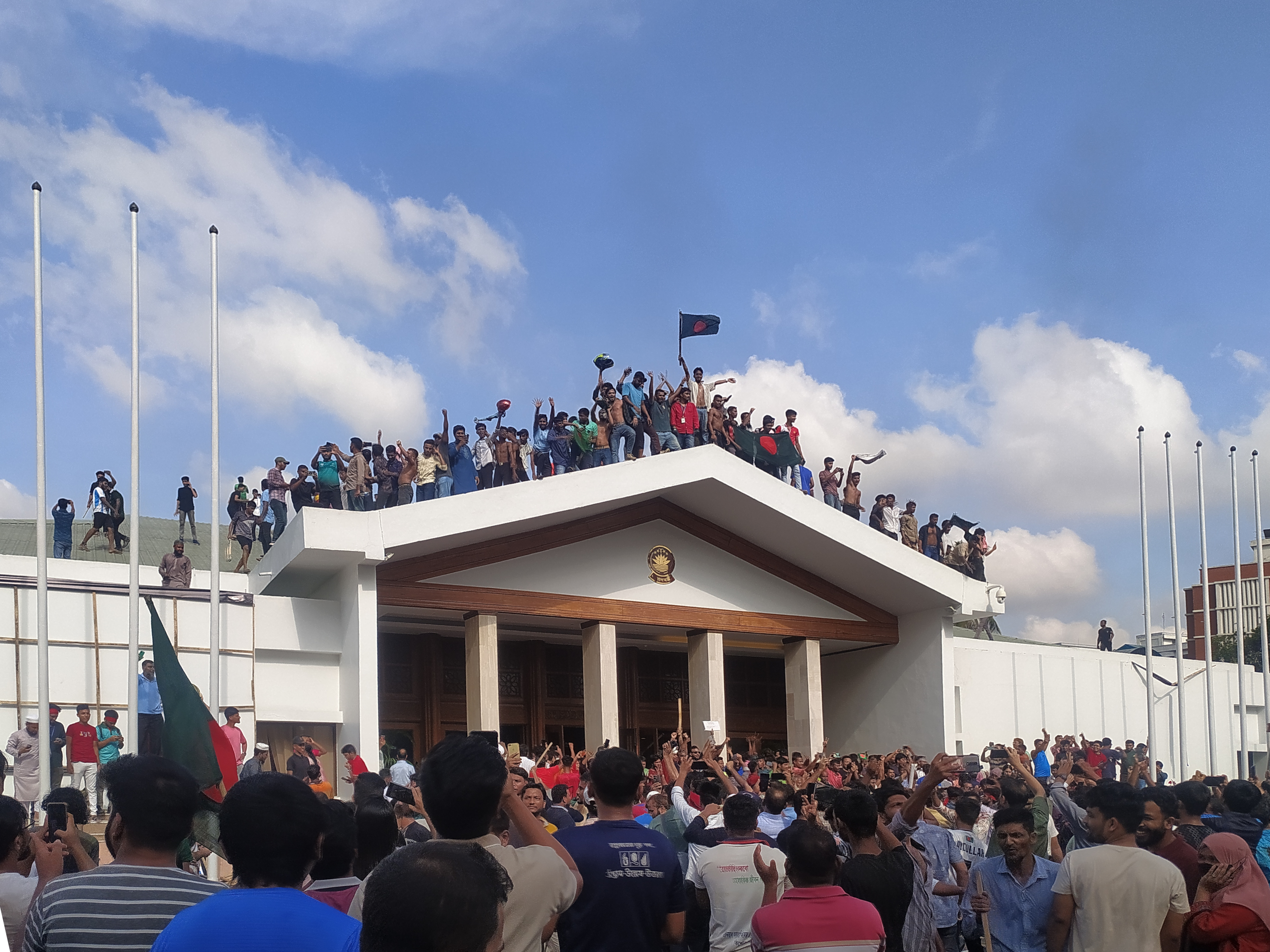
People cheering in front of the Prime Minister's Office, 5 August 2024

By 11:00 AM, the protesters broke through police barricades near the prime minister's office. The clashes between security forces and protesters escalated rapidly, with reports of live ammunition being used, leading to casualties on both sides.

At around 12:30 PM, news broke that the protesters had successfully stormed the gates of Ganabhaban, forcing their way onto the grounds. However, reports indicated that Hasina had already been rushed to a "secure location" within the compound. By 2:00 PM, the protesters’ also stormed the Jatiya Sangsad.

Following the violence and key national points being overwhelmed by the protesters, reports started spreading of Sheikh Hasina's resignation and flight. On 3:00 pm (BST), The Army Chief of Staff, General Waker-uz-Zaman confirmed the resignation and self imposed exile of Sheikh Hasina during an address to nation following the political vacuum left by Hasina's exit.

Hasina reportedly flew in a Bangladesh Air Force C-130 transport to Hindan Air Force Station in Ghaziabad, India, where she was received by the National Security Advisor of India, Ajit Doval, along with other senior military officials. Indian minister of external affairs S. Jaishankar told the Indian Parliament that,

At very short notice, she [Sheikh Hasina] requested approval to come for the moment to India.

== Aftermath ==
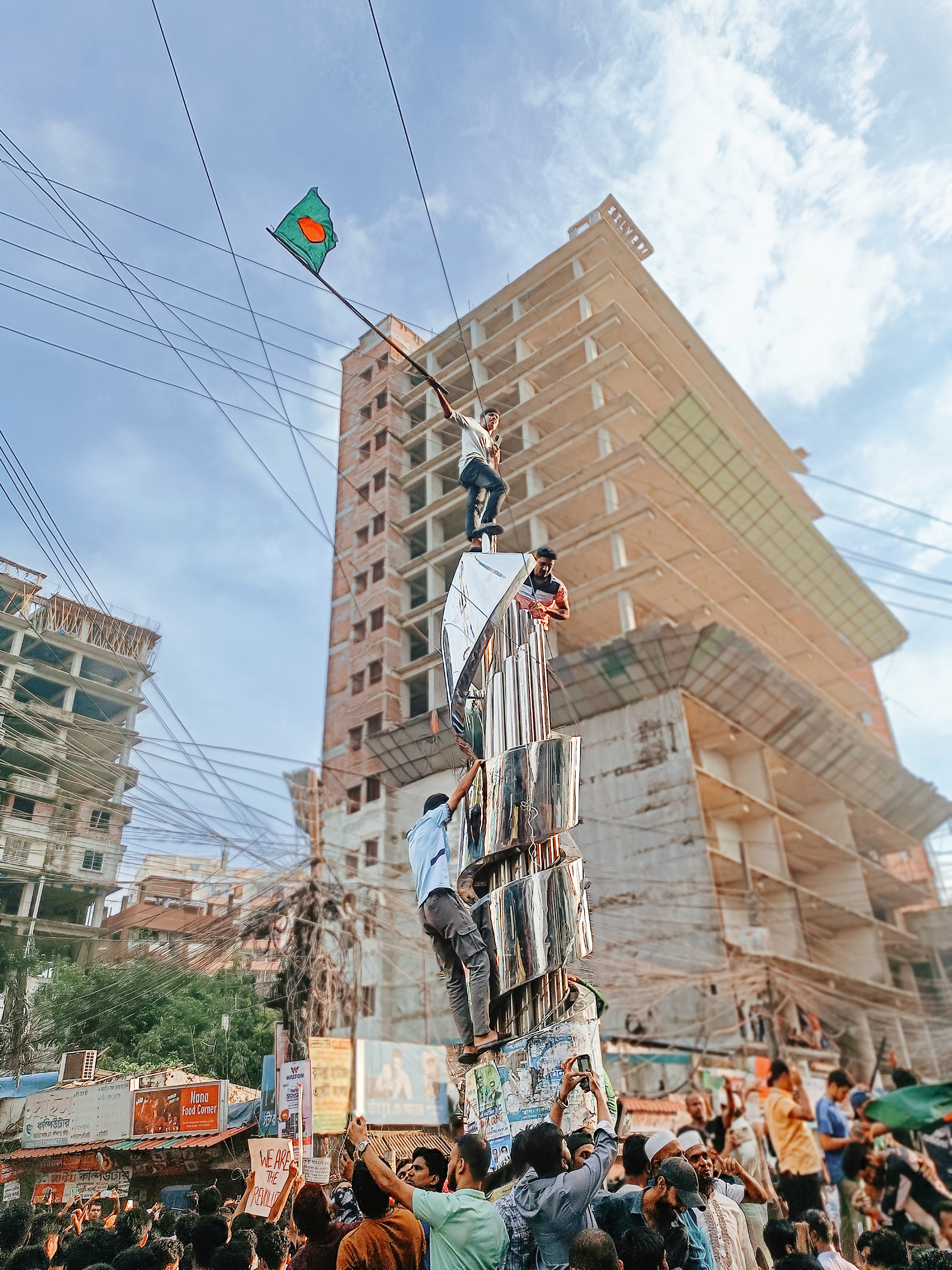
Public celebration in Comilla after the resignation of Sheikh Hasina

On 8 August 2024, an interim government was formed to manage the transition of power and organize elections. The previous parliament was dissolved on 6 August following Hasina's exile. Nobel laureate Muhammad Yunus was appointed to lead the administration by mutual consensus among key political and civil groups including protesting lead the Students Against Discrimination.

Public celebrations erupted across the country as many viewed Hasina's resignation as a victory for the protest movement. The Students Against Discrimination and other civil society groups, however, remained active, demanding systemic reforms, including changes to the electoral process and judiciary.

International responses to the resignation highlighted concerns over stability and democratic progress. United Nations and Amnesty International emphasized the need to protect human rights, as following the fall of Hasina administration, violence targeting Hasina's supporters and religious minorities broke out. They also called the interim government to ensure accountability for anyone involved in the violence during the protests.

=== Controversy surrounding resignation letter ===
In October 2024, during a conversation with Manab Zamin's Chief Editor, Matiur Rahman Chowdhury, President Mohammed Shahabuddin stated that,

I tried to collect the resignation letter many times but failed. Maybe she did not get the time. When things came under control, one day the cabinet secretary came to collect the copy of the resignation letter. I told him that I too am looking for it.

Shahabuddin cited concerns over the resignation of Sheikh Hasina as Prime Minister, and the legality of the interim government as per the existing constitution.

Following the remarks, the interim government's Adviser for Law, Justice and Parliamentary Affairs, Asif Nazrul said,

The president's statement that he did not receive Sheikh Hasina's resignation letter is a lie, and it is a violation of his oath.

The Chief Adviser's Deputy Press Secretary, Apurba Jahangir, agreed with the Law Adviser's views during a press briefing at the Foreign Service Academy and said,

The government also agrees that by lying about the letter, the president has violated his oath.

Asif Mahmud, the Adviser for the Ministries of Youth and Sports and Labor and Employment, posted on Facebook stating,

Prime Minister Sheikh Hasina had verbally communicated her resignation to the President. While, she was initially expected to deliver a formal resignation letter at Bangabhaban, the approach of protesters near Ganabhaban reportedly necessitated her departure from the location.

Mahmud questioned the implications of the resignation occurring under these circumstances.

During a roundtable discussion organized by Islami Andolan Bangladesh in Segunbagicha, Sarjis Alam, one of the coordinator of Students Against Discrimination stated,

If a person like President Mohammed Shahabuddin says that he does not have the documents of Sheikh Hasina's resignation, then it will be up to the student community to decide what action should be taken against him.

Another coordinator, Hasnat Abdullah, also posted on social media stating,

Awami League as a party should face justice, a new constitution should be written, corrupt Awami bureaucrats should be sacked, all illegal agreements made during Hasina's tenure should be cancelled, and Chuppu should be removed from the post of president immediately.

Nasiruddin Patwary, convener of the Jatiya Nagorik Committee, also criticised President Mohammed Shahabuddin, saying,

(President) Chuppu is part of the fascist regime. He has no right to remain as president, and we will not allow any element of this regime to persist after the mass uprising.

== See also ==
- Bangladesh–India relations
- Controversies related to Sheikh Hasina
- July Mass Uprising Day
- List of people granted political asylum
- Sheikh Mujibur Rahman statue destruction
