= M Moyeen Alam Firozee =

Barrister Moyeen Alam Firozee
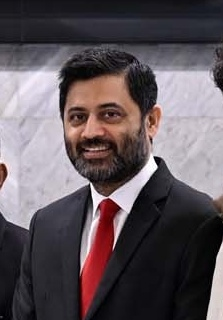
- Born: Rajapur, Jhalakathi District, Bangladesh
- Education: University of Wolverhampton (LL.B. Hons)
- Occupations: Lawyer, Educator
- Years active: 1999–present
- Notable work: Masdar Hossain Case, Constitution 2nd, 14th, and 16th Amendment Cases

Moyeen Alam Firozee is a Bangladeshi lawyer and constitutional expert who has been practicing before the Supreme Court of Bangladesh for over 25 years. He is a member of the Constitutional Reform Commission of the Muhammad Yunus led Interim government. He is an independent director of Southeast Bank PLC.

== Early life and education ==
Firozee was born in Rajapur, Jhalakathi District. His father, Abdul Hakim Akan, was a surgeon and oncologist. He completed bachelor of law from the University of Wolverhampton.

== Career ==
Firozee was directly involved in the Masdar Hossain Case, which laid the foundation for the independence of the judiciary in Bangladesh. He also worked alongside his senior, Barrister M. Amir Ul Islam, in the 4th Amendment Case, which addressed the issue of women's representation in Parliament. As lead counsel in the Second Amendment to the Constitution case, Firozee challenged the constitutional validity of emergency powers. In the Constitution 16th Amendment Case, he was one of the lead counsels advocating against the amendment that granted Parliament the authority to remove judges.

Firozee taught English constitutional law at Newcastle Law Academy and the London College of Legal Studies (South). He has also served as a faculty member at East West University and Northern University, Bangladesh.

Firozee serves as the Chairman of the Legal Affairs Committee and is a life member of the Diabetic Association of Bangladesh. A recipient of the President Scouts Award, he served for nine years as the Deputy National Commissioner (Law) of Bangladesh Scouts. He is an independent director of Southeast Bank PLC.

After the fall of the Sheikh Hasina led Awami League government, Firozee was appointed member of the Constitutional Reform Commission of the Muhammad Yunus led Interim government.
