= Mahdin Chowdhury =

Bangladeshi lawyer (born 1969)

Mahdin Chowdhury is a Bangladeshi lawyer and member of the Anti Corruption Commission Reform Commission of the Muhammad Yunus led interim government. He is a member of the Jatiyatabadi Ainjibi Oikya Pannel and the Bangladesh Nationalist Party.

== Early life ==
Chowdhury was born in 1969. He completed his Bachelor of Law in 2007 at the University of London.

== Career ==
In 2008, Chowdhury worked at Mitre Court Chambers. From 2009 to 2018, he has served as a Senior Associate at Sultan, Fida & Reza. He has worked under the former attorney general of Bangladesh Fida M. Kamal. He was a lecturer at the British School of Law, Bangladesh.

In April 2022, Chowdhury was elected to the Bangladesh Supreme Court Bar Association as a candidate of the Jatiyatabadi Ainjibi Oikya Pannel, aligned with the Bangladesh Nationalist Party. He was the lawyer for the family of Harris Chowdhury, a Bangladesh Nationalist Party politician. He had represented in the family in their petition to have his body exhumed for a DNA test as he was buried under a fake name.

Chowdhury is a member of the Ziaur Rahman Foundation and the Sunamganj District unit of the Bangladesh Nationalist Party. He has practised in the Appellate Division of the Bangladesh Supreme Court. He has worked with Odhikar. He is an associate of a IP law firm in Bangladesh.

Following the fall of the Sheikh Hasina led Awami League government, Chowdhury was made member of the Anti-Corruption Commission formed by the Muhammad Yunus led Interim government to reform the Anti-Corruption Commission.
