= Interim government (Bangladesh) =

Form of government in Bangladesh

Interim government of the People's Republic of Bangladesh
- গণপ্রজাতন্ত্রী বাংলাদেশের অন্তর্বর্তীকালীন সরকার
- Seal of the Chief Adviser

- Flag of the Chief Adviser
- Style: His Excellency (Diplomatic); Honourable Chief Adviser (Informal); Honourable (Formal)
- Member of: Cabinet
- Residence: Jamuna State Guest House
- Appointer: President of Bangladesh
- Term length: No fixed time; until a general election is held and a new prime minister takes office.
- Formation: Shahabuddin Ahmed: 9 December 1990; 35 years ago Muhammad Yunus: 8 August 2024; 2 years ago
- First holder: Shahabuddin Ahmed
- Final holder: Muhammad Yunus

The interim government of Bangladesh was established following the 1990 mass uprising resulting in the overthrow of President Hussain Muhammad Ershad, the interim government was led by Shahabuddin Ahmed. It was revived again following the July Uprising resulting in Prime Minister Sheikh Hasina's resignation and fleeing from the country to India, and was led by Muhammad Yunus.

== Background ==
This first interim government system was formed on 9 December 1990, following the resignation of Hussain Muhammad Ershad. The second interim government was formed on 5 August 2024, by the president of Bangladesh in consultation with several coordinators of the Students Against Discrimination and the Chief of Army Staff. Subsequently, on August 8, an interim government was formed with Muhammad Yunus as the chief adviser. This system serves as the successor to the former caretaker government of Bangladesh.

== Titles and roles ==
The titles and status of the members of Interim government are as follows:

Title	Equivalent
Chief Adviser	Prime Minister of an elected government
Adviser	Minister of an elected government
Other Titles used in Yunus Ministry
Special Envoy to the Chief Adviser	Status equivalent to Adviser/Minister
High Representative to the Chief Adviser	Status equivalent to Adviser/Minister
National Security Adviser	Status equivalent to Adviser/Minister
Special Assistant to the Chief Adviser	Status equivalent to Secretary/Senior Secretary or Adviser/Minister
Special Assistant	Status equivalent to Minister of State
