= Safar Raj Hossain =

Safar Raj Hossain is a retired civil servant, former Home Affairs Secretary, and chairman of the Police Administration Reform Commission formed by the interim government led by Muhammad Yunus. He is a former director general of the office of Prime Minister Khaleda Zia. He is the former secretary of the Local Government Division.

== Early life ==
Hossain completed his secondary education from Bogura Zilla School. He completed his master's in physics at the University of Rajshahi in 1971. He finished his law degree in 1973. He completed a masters in public administration at the Harvard University in 1981.

== Career ==
Hossain joined the Bangladesh Civil Service in 1977.

Hossain was the Deputy Commissioner (DC) of Comilla District in 2001. He was then appointed the Joint Secretary in the Ministry of Health and Family Welfare. In 2003, while serving as the Director General of the Prime Minister's Office under Prime Minister Khaleda Zia.

From 14 October 2003 to 20 March 2005, Hossain was the secretary of the Ministry of Public Administration. He was then appointed secretary of the Ministry of Home Affairs. In June 2005, he was sued in a murder case filed by the mother of a Jubo League activist who was killed in a crossfire by Rapid Action Battalion.

Hossain served as the secretary of the Ministry of Home Affairs till 2006. He inaugurated a conference of police chiefs of SAARC countries in Dhaka in May 2006. He was made the Secretary of the Ministry of Local Government, Rural Development and Co-operatives in October 2006 after President Iajuddin Ahmed formed a neutral caretaker government to hold general elections. Secretary of the Local Government Division of the Ministry of Local Government, Rural Development and Co-operatives S. M. Jahirul Islam was in return made the secretary of the Ministry of Home Affairs. He oversaw the start of the Banani-Gulshan Bridge construction.

From 2009 to 2011, Hossain was a consultant of the United States Agency for International Development. In 2010, he was a director of the Dhaka Electric Supply Company Limited. He is an independent director of Federal Insurance Company.

After the fall of the Sheikh Hasina led Awami League government, Hossain was appointed head of a newly created Police Administration Reform Commission. The commission included Abu Momtaz Saad Uddin Ahmed, ASM Nasiruddin Elan, Md Golam Rasul, Mohammad Harun Chowdhury, Mohammad Iqbal, Sheikh Sajjad Ali, and Shahnaz Huda. One of the first recommendation was removal of political background check from the hiring process of police officers.
