= Muhammad Ekramul Haque =

Muhammad Ekramul Haque is a Bangladeshi academic lawyer and academic who is professor of Comparative Constitutional Law and dean of the Department of Law at the University of Dhaka. He is a member of the Constitutional Reform Commission formed by the interim government led by Muhammad Yunus. He is a faculty member and advisor of the department of law at East West University.

== Early life ==
Ekramul Haque completed his bachelor's and master's in law at the University of Dhaka in 1996 and 1997 respectively. He completed his PhD at Monash University in 2012.

== Career ==
Ekramul Haque joined the University of Dhaka as a lecturer on 28 October 2003 in the department of law. He was a visiting faculty at the Department of Women and Gender Studies from 2005 to 2006 and later becoming a part time lecturer of the department. In January 2007, he was promoted to assistant professor and associate professor in 2012.

Ekramul Haque became an advisor to the Department of Law at East West University in December 2022. He became a senior research scholar at the Program on Constitutional Studies of the School of Law at the University of Texas at Austin. In April 2023, he said that the Proclamation of Bangladeshi Independence, was "not merely a creation of skillful draftsmen but rather a reflection of the will of the people".

Following the fall of the Sheikh Hasina led Awami League government, Ekramul Haque wrote about the legality of the Muhmmad Yunus led interim government on 15 August 2024. was appointed dean of the Department of Law of the University of Dhaka in September 2024. He was appointed head of an investigation body of the University of Dhaka to investigate the violence against students protesting against former Prime Minister Sheikh Hasina from 15 July to 5 August. He was made a member of the Constitutional Reform Commission in October led by Ali Riaz. About the mission of the commission he said, "Before we can decide whether we need a new constitution or the current one will be amended, we have to determine what changes are necessary,".

== Bibliography ==
- Law of Contract, 2004.
- Islamic Law of Inheritance, 2009.
- Muslim Family Law, 2015.
