= Ali Riaz =

Bangladeshi political scientist and writer

- আলী রীয়াজ
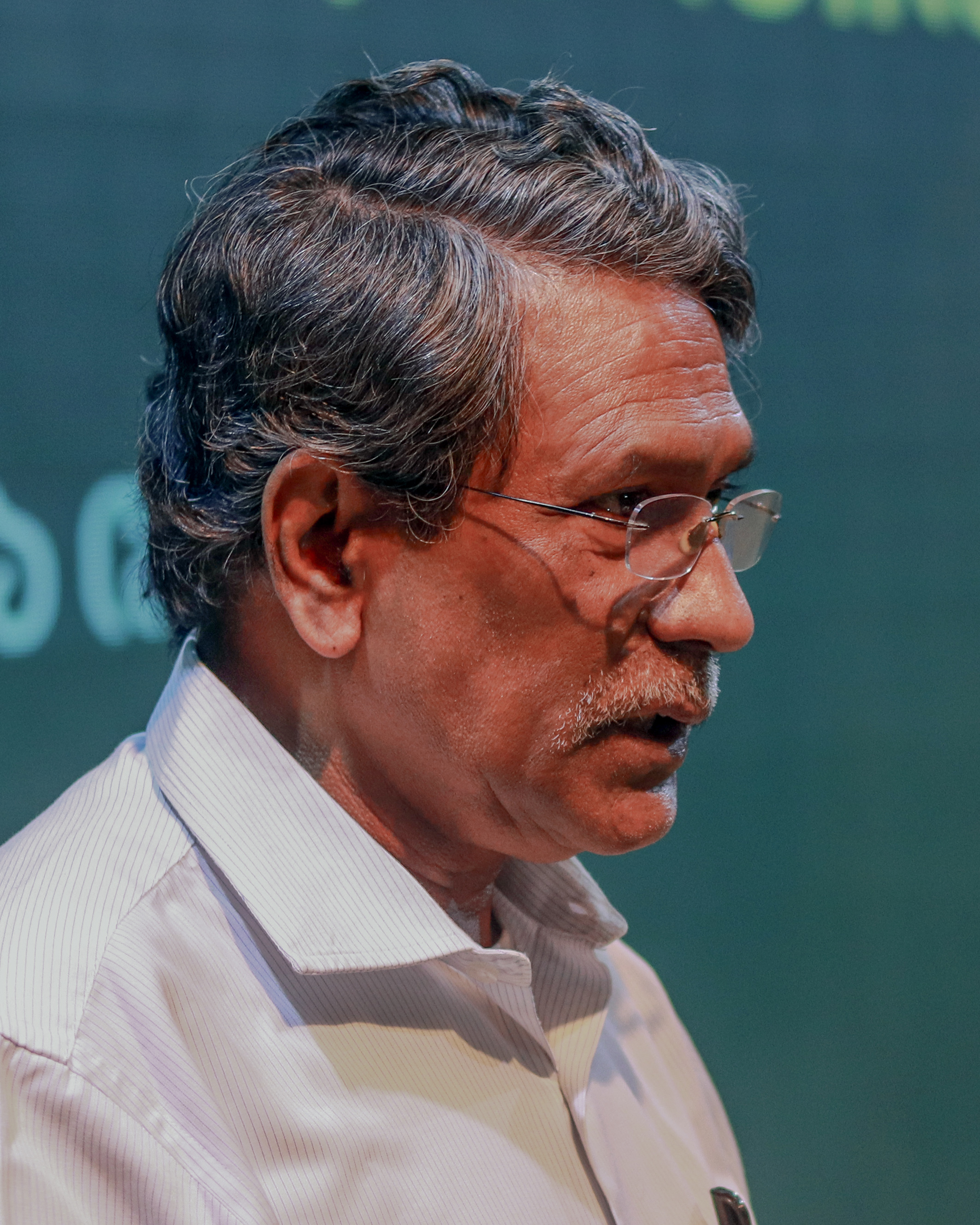
- Riaz in 2025

Special Assistant to the Chief Adviser
- In office 13 November 2025 – 17 February 2026
- Chief Adviser: Muhammad Yunus

Head of Constitutional Reform Commission
- In office 11 September 2024 – 17 January 2025
- Chief Adviser: Muhammad Yunus

Personal details
- Born: 1958 (age 67–68) Dhaka, East Pakistan
- Education: University of Dhaka; University of Hawaii
- Occupation: Political scientist Writer

Ali Riaz is a Bangladeshi American political scientist and writer. He served as the Special Assistant to the Chief Adviser. He was the Vice Chairman of National Consensus Commission and Head of Constitutional Reform Commission. He is a distinguished professor at Illinois State University where he joined in 2002. Most of his work deals with religion and politics, particularly on South Asian politics and political Islam. He has written extensively on Bangladeshi politics and madrasas in South Asia. He was the editor of Studies on Asia, a bi-annual journal of the Midwestern Conference on Asian Affairs (2010–2015).

In 2024, Riaz was tasked by the Interim government of Bangladesh to head a commission on constitutional reform after the end of the then prime minister Sheikh Hasina's rule.

== Early ‍life and education ==
Riaz was born in Dhaka, East Pakistan (today Bangladesh) to Mohabbat Ali, a senior public servant and Bilkis Ara. He earned his baccalaureate and master's degree in Mass Communication and Journalism from the University of Dhaka in 1981 and 1983, respectively. He was awarded a graduate student fellowship at the East West Center at Honolulu, Hawaii in 1987, where he earned master's degrees in communication (1989) and in political science (1991) under the EWC fellowship from the University of Hawaii. He completed his Doctor of Philosophy in political science in 1993 on civil-military relationship in Bangladesh. His study offers a structural-historical interpretation of the causes of and conditions for the military rule in Bangladesh in its first decade, 1972–1981.

== Career ==
Riaz started his career as a lecturer at the Department of Mass Communication and Journalism at the University of Dhaka (DU) in 1984 where he served until 1987. Upon completion of his doctoral degree he returned to the Dhaka University as a faculty. In 1994, he received the South-Southeast Asia Fellowship of the Institute of Southeast Asian Studies (ISEAS) at Singapore where he studied the role of telecommunication in economic growth in Singapore and Malaysia. Between 1995 and 2000, he was a senior broadcast journalist at the BBC World Service at London. Since then he has taught at University of Lincoln in England, Claflin University at South Carolina, USA and joined the Department of Politics and Government at Illinois State University in 2002. He became professor in 2008 and in 2012 he was named the University Professor.

His works have focused on political Islam and rise of Islamism in Bangladesh. His books God Willing: The Politics of Islamism in Bangladesh (2004) and Islamist Militancy in Bangladesh: A Complex Web (2008) focus on the transformation of a country which was founded on the basis of a secular principle, but forsook its secularist tradition of centuries in less than a decade and embraced Islam as state religion. The political actors, their strategies, and methods of instrumentalisation of Islam in the third largest Muslim majority country of the world are indicative of how and why the ideology of Islamism appeals, and how domestic, regional and international events influence the dynamics. The findings that the war in Afghanistan between 1979 and 1989, US foreign policy towards the Middle East, and the fifty year regional rivalry between India and Pakistan facilitated this transformation as much as domestic power jockeying made other analysts take pause before presenting simplistic interpretations such as poverty or Muslim exceptionalism as the causes.

Riaz's work on madrasas in South Asia has drawn attention of academics and policy-makers alike. In post-2001 Riaz challenged the dominant, at times alarmist, literature produced by policy analysts that madrasas (Islamic seminaries) in Muslim societies are "the schools of jihad" and "the breeding grounds of terrorists." Drawing on the policy documents of the US government, he has demonstrated the shortcomings of US policies towards South Asian madrasas in his book Faithful Education: Madrasahs in South Asia (2008). The book explores the history of these institutions, their role in contemporary society and politics, and relationships with local militancy and transnational terrorism in three countries namely Pakistan, India and Bangladesh. This book also provides probing analysis of the curriculum of institutions, both historical and contemporary. Underscoring the need for reform, this study also maps the way forward for rendering these institutions relevant to future generations and suggests what policy makers of the United States and other countries can do.

Riaz has also studied the relationship between state and society and has written extensively on this topic. His co-authored book, Paradise Lost? State Failure in Nepal (2007) examines the relationship in Nepal while his book Unfolding State; The Transformation of Bangladesh (2006) looks at Bangladesh's structural transformation in the first 25 years. Paradise Lost demonstrates that the nature of the state, disjuncture between the state and the society, and the rupture of the ideological hegemony of the ruling class of Nepal have created a situation where existing institutional frameworks are disintegrating and the state is rapidly unraveling. The study analyses the roles of ethnicity, identity, and deprivation, in engendering discontent and the rise of the Maoists as a formidable political force.

In addition to more than a dozen books in English, he has authored ten books in Bengali. Since 2010 Riaz every month contributes two op-ed commentary in Bengali and English in leading Bangladeshi daily newspapers Prothom Alo, The Daily Star, and frequently writes in leading Bangladeshi news monthly Forum. He is frequently interviewed by international media such as the BBC Bengali service, Al-Jazeera, the [VOA] Bengali service, Deutsche Welle radio, International Relations and Security Network (ISN) in Zurich. He served as consultant to various international organisations, such as the Social Science Research Council (SSRC), the Woodrow Wilson International Center for Scholars, the United Nations Development Program (UNDP), the Department for International Development (DfID of the United Kingdom), the USAID, Finnish Foreign Ministry and the Bertelsmann Foundation (of Germany). Riaz appeared before congressional commissions to provide expert testimony. On 20 November 2013, Riaz testified before the House Subcommittee on Asia and the Pacific on the political turmoil surrounding the Bangladeshi elections scheduled for January 2014. He testified again on 30 April 2015 before the House Subcommittee on Asia and the Pacific.

In 2023, Riaz was interviewed by various international new organization after the Secretary of State of the United States Antony Blinken announced new visa policy on Bangladesh which restricted visa to those involved with undermining election in Bangladesh. He published a new book called Trials and Tribulations: Politics, Economy and Foreign Affairs of Bangladesh. The book is dedicated to Mushtaq Ahmed, died in custody after being detained for criticizing the government, and covers the Awami League rule starting in 2009.

== Works ==
=== Selected books in English ===
- Riaz, Ali (2008). Faithful education: madrassahs in South Asia. Rutgers University Press. ISBN 978-0-8135-5422-8.
- Paradise Lost? State Failure in Nepal, Ali Riaz and Subho Basu, (Lexington Books; 2010) ISBN 0739146645
- God Willing: The Politics of Islamism in Bangladesh, Ali Riaz, (Rowman & Littlefield Publishers; 2004) ISBN 074253085X
- Islamist Militancy in Bangladesh: A Complex Web(Routledge Contemporary South Asia), Ali Riaz, (Routledge; 2007) ISBN 0415576695
- Islam and Identity Politics Among British-Bangladeshis: A Leap of Faith, Ali Riaz, (Manchester University Press; 2013) ISBN 0719089557
- Unfolding State: The Transformation of Bangladesh, Ali Riaz, (de Sitter Publications; 2005) ISBN 1897160100
- Inconvenient Truths about Bangladeshi Politics, Ali Riaz, (Prothoma Prokashan, Bangladesh; 2012) ISBN 9849003944
- Political Islam and Governance in Bangladesh (Routledge Contemporary South Asia Series), Ali Riaz, (Routledge; 2010) ISBN 0415576733
- Religion and Politics in South Asia, Ali Riaz, (Routledge; 2010) ISBN 0415778018
- (Re)Reading Taslima Nasrin: Context, Contents, and Construction, edited by Ali Riaz, (Mukto-Mona; 2005)
- Voice & silence: Contextualizing Taslima Nasreen, Ali Riaz, (Ankur Prakashani, Bangladesh; 1995) ISBN 9844640199
- State, class & military rule: Political economy of martial law in Bangladesh, Ali Riaz, (Nadi New Press; 1994) ISBN 9848103511

=== Selected books in Bengali ===
- Sheikh Mujib & Other Issues (1987/rpn. 2001) শেখ মুজিব ও অন্যান্য প্রসঙ্গ
- The Culture of Fear (1994) ভয়ের সংস্কৃতি; Sahitya Prakasa (1994) ISBN 9844650631
- Crises of Ruling Classes of Bangladesh (1993) বাংলাদেশের শাসক শ্রেণির সংকট; Samaya Prakasana (1993) ISBN 9844580668
- Unity in Democratic Movement (1983) গণতান্ত্রিক আন্দোলনে ঐক্য
