= Chief Adviser of Bangladesh =

Head of the interim and caretaker government of Bangladesh

Chief Adviser of the People's Republic of Bangladesh
- গণপ্রজাতন্ত্রী বাংলাদেশের প্রধান উপদেষ্টা
- Seal of the chief adviser

- Standard of the chief adviser
- Incumbent; Vacant since 17 February 2026
- Government of Bangladesh; Chief Adviser's Office; Cabinet Division
- Style: Mr. Chief Adviser (informal); The Honorable (formal); His Excellency (diplomatic)
- Type: Head of government
- Abbreviation: CA
- Member of: Cabinet; Armed Forces Division; Planning Commission; Intelligence Community; National Committee for Intelligence Coordination; National Committee on Security Affairs; National Cyber Security Council
- Reports to: President of Bangladesh
- Residence: State Guest House Jamuna
- Seat: Primary: Chief Adviser's Office, Old Sangsad Bhaban, Tejgaon, Dhaka; Secondary: Bangladesh Secretariat, Segunbagicha, Dhaka
- Appointer: President of Bangladesh
- Term length: Until the next general election takes place
- Constituting instrument: Constitution of Bangladesh
- Precursor: Prime Minister of Bangladesh
- Inaugural holder: Muhammad Habibur Rahman
- Formation: 30 March 1996; 30 years ago
- Final holder: Muhammad Yunus
- Succession: Prime Minister's Office
- Salary: ৳305000 (US$2,500) per month (incl. allowances)
- Website: cao.gov.bd

The chief adviser of Bangladesh, (Note: Bengali: বাংলাদেশের প্রধান উপদেষ্টা, romanized: Baṅladeśer Prôdhan Upôdeśta) officially the chief adviser of the People's Republic of Bangladesh, (Note: Bengali: গণপ্রজাতন্ত্রী বাংলাদেশের প্রধান উপদেষ্টা, romanized: Gôṇôprôjatôntri Baṅladeśer Prôdhan Upôdeśta, IPA: [ˈɡɔnoˌpɾodʒaˌt̪ɔnt̪ɾiˑ ˈbaŋlaˌd̪eʃeɾ ˈpɾɔd̪ʱan ˈupoˌd̪eʃt̪aˑ]) is the chief executive of the caretaker and the interim government of Bangladesh, who serves as the head of government during the transition period between one elected government and another. With powers roughly equivalent to those of the prime minister of an elected government, their executive power is limited by the constitution. The chief adviser leads an advisory committee comprising several advisers (equivalent to a minister), all of them selected from among politically neutral individuals to be acceptable to all major political parties. The office of the chief adviser is called Chief Adviser's Office.

== History ==
The caretaker government system of Bangladesh was introduced in March 1996 through the passage of the 13th amendment to the Bangladesh constitution. The system was formed to hold parliamentary elections after the election in February conducted by the Khaleda Zia government was widely boycotted by the opposition parties. The amendment recommended making the last retired chief justice the chief adviser. In 1996, Justice Muhammad Habibur Rahman was appointed the chief adviser of the caretaker government. Along with the President of Bangladesh, Abdur Rahman Biswas, prevented the 1996 Bangladesh coup d'état attempt.

The Bangladesh Nationalist Party had some difficult appointing a chief adviser to the caretaker government, which led to the 2006–08 Bangladeshi political crisis. The Bangladesh Nationalist Party appointed President Iajuddin Ahmed the chief adviser to the caretaker government, but he faced demands for resignation from Bangladesh Awami League. Iajuddin Ahmed was replaced by Fakhruddin Ahmed. During the crisis, the military-backed caretaker government was led by Chief Adviser Fakhruddin Ahmed. Fakhruddin Ahmed appointed three special assistants to himself who were given the rank of a state minister. The assistants were Barrister Debashis Roy, Brigadier-General M. A. Malek, and Professor M Tamim. There was some debate about the constitutional validity of the assistant to the chief advisers.

The caretaker government system was scrapped along with the 13th amendment in 2011 through the passage of the 15th Amendment of the constitution to allow the elected government to conduct any general election in the future, with the chief justice of Bangladesh, A.B.M. Khairul Haque, declaring the caretaker government system illegal and unconstitutional.

The office of Chief Adviser was restored in August 2024 under the extra-constitutional setup of an interim government, following the resignation of Prime Minister Sheikh Hasina and Muhammad Yunus took the position. Following the High Court's verdict in December 2024, several sections of the Fifteenth Amendment were scrapped, formally restoring the caretaker system.

== Composition of the non-party caretaker government ==
1. Non-party caretaker government shall consist of the chief adviser at its head and ten or fewer other advisers, all of whom shall be appointed by the president.
2. The chief adviser and other advisers shall be appointed within fifteen days after Parliament is dissolved or stands dissolved, and during the period between the date on which Parliament is dissolved or stands dissolved and the date on which the chief adviser is appointed, the prime minister and his cabinet who were in office immediately before Jatiya Sangsad (Parliament) was dissolved or stood dissolved shall continue to hold office as such.
3. The president shall appoint as chief adviser the person who among the retired chief justices retired last and who is qualified to be appointed as an adviser under this article: Provided that if such retired chief justice is not available or is not willing to hold the office of chief adviser, the president shall appoint as chief adviser the person who among the retired chief justice of Bangladesh retired next before the last retired chief justice.
4. If no retired chief justice is available or willing to hold the office of chief adviser, the president shall appoint as chief adviser the person who among the retired judges of the Appellate Division retired last and who is qualified to be appointed as an adviser under this article: Provided that if such retired judge is not available or is not willing to hold the office of chief adviser, the president shall appoint as chief adviser the person who among the retired judges of the Appellate Division retired next before the last such retired judge.
5. If no retired judge of the Appellate Division is available or willing to hold the office of chief adviser, the president shall, after consultation, as far as practicable, with the major political parties, appoint the chief adviser from among citizens of Bangladesh who are qualified to be appointed as advisers under this article.
6. Notwithstanding anything contained in this chapter, if the provisions of clauses (3), (4) and (5) cannot be given effect to, the president shall assume the functions of the chief adviser of the non-party caretaker government in addition to his functions under this Constitution.
7. The president shall appoint advisers from among the persons who are
  1. qualified for election as members of parliament;
  2. not members of any political party or any organisation associated with or affiliated to any political party;
  3. not, and have agreed in writing not to be, candidates for the ensuing election of members of parliament;
  4. not over seventy-two years of age.
8. The advisers shall be appointed by the president on the advice of the chief adviser.
9. The chief adviser or an adviser may resign his office by writing under his hand addressed to the president.
10. The chief adviser or an adviser shall cease to be chief adviser or adviser if he is disqualified to be appointed as such under this article.
11. The chief adviser shall have the status, and shall be entitled to the remuneration and privileges, of a prime minister, and an adviser shall have the status, and shall be entitled to the remuneration and privileges, of a minister.
12. The non-party caretaker government shall stand dissolved on the date on which the prime minister enters upon his office after the constitution of the new parliament.

== Chief Adviser's Office ==
The Chief Adviser's Office (CAO) (Bengali: প্রধান উপদেষ্টার কার্যালয়, romanized: Prôdhān Upôdēṣṭār Kārjālôẏ) is the official workplace of the chief adviser of Bangladesh during an interim or caretaker government. Its the office of the Head of Government of Bangladesh during an interim or caretaker government. It is equivalent to the Prime Minister's Office during an elected government.

It represents the executive branch of the Government of the People's Republic of Bangladesh during an interim or caretaker government. The location of the CAO is in Tejgaon, Dhaka.

=== Headquarters ===
Following the resignation of Prime Minister Sheikh Hasina, an Interim government led by Muhammad Yunus was formed on 8 August 2024. During the initial days of the interim government, Jamuna State Guest House acted as the Chief Adviser's Office as the Prime Minister's Office at Tejgaon was vandalised on 5 August 2024 as the result of July Uprising. After 15 days of repair work, the office was restored and converted into the Chief Adviser's Office.

=== Organizations under Chief Adviser's Office ===
The following is the list of organizations under CAO:

1. Sub-regional Co-operation Cell (SRCC)
2. Governance Innovation Unit (GIU)
3. Private Export Processing Zone (PEPZ)
4. NGO Affairs Bureau
5. Bangladesh Economic Zones Authority (BEZA)
6. Bangladesh Export Processing Zone Authority (BEPZA)
7. Bangladesh Investment Development Authority (BIDA)
8. Public-Private Partnership Authority (PPPA)
9. National Skills Development Authority (NSDA)
10. Special Security Force (SSF)
11. National Security Intelligence (NSI)

== List of chief advisers of Bangladesh ==
There have been 5 chief advisers of Bangladesh so far.

#	Name (Birth–Death)	Portrait	Entered office	Left office	Tenure	Advisor Council
Caretaker government of Bangladesh
1	Muhammad Habibur Rahman (1928–2014)		30 March 1996	23 June 1996	85 days	Habibur
2	Latifur Rahman (1936–2017)		15 July 2001	10 October 2001	87 days	Latifur
3	Iajuddin Ahmed (1931–2012); President		29 October 2006	11 January 2007	74 days	Iajuddin
-	Fazlul Haque (1938–2023); Acting Chief Adviser		11 January 2007	12 January 2007	1 day	—N/a
4	Fakhruddin Ahmed (1940–)		12 January 2007	6 January 2009	1 year, 360 days	Fakhruddin
Interim government of Bangladesh
5	Muhammad Yunus (1940–)		8 August 2024	17 February 2026	1 year, 193 days	Yunus

== See also ==
- Prime Minister of Bangladesh
- President of Bangladesh
- List of prime ministers of Bangladesh
- List of heads of government of Bangladesh
