= Bangladesh Agricultural Research Council =

Research institute in Bangladesh

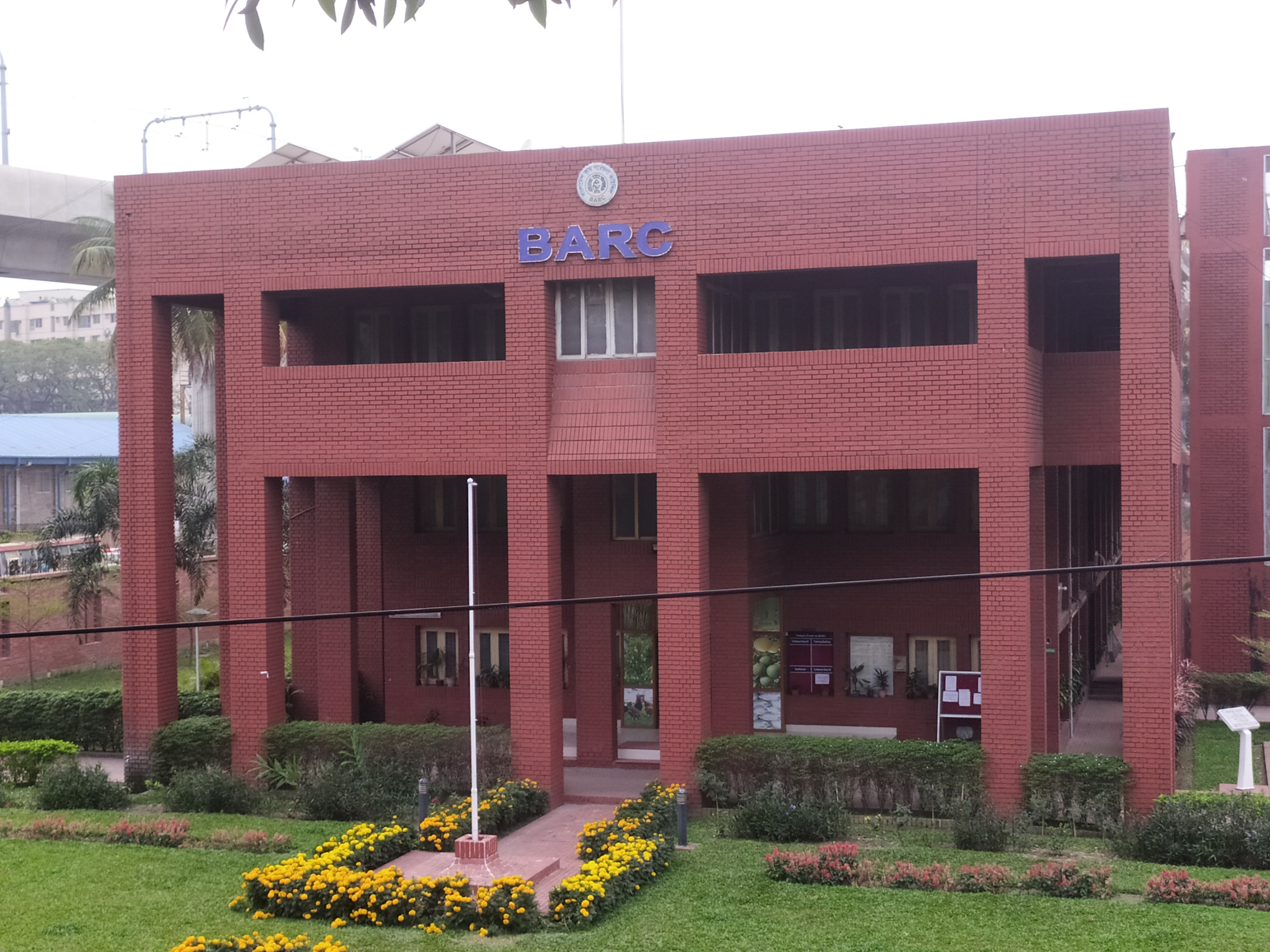
- Bangladesh Agricultural Research Council Building
- Abbreviation: BARC
- Formation: 1973
- Headquarters: Farmgate, Dhaka-1215, Bangladesh
- Region served: Bangladesh
- Official language: Bengali
- Executive Chairman: Dr. Shaikh Mohammad Bokhtiar
- Website: Bangladesh Agricultural Research Council

Bangladesh Agricultural Research Council is the body in charge of the National Agricultural Research System and is located in Farmgate, Dhaka, Bangladesh. The institute won the Independence Award in 2021 for its outstanding contribution to research and training.

== History ==
It was established in 1973 by Presidential Order 32. There are currently eleven national research institute under the body. Seven of the research institutes: Bangladesh Agricultural Research Institute, Bangladesh Wheat and Maize Research Institute, Soil Resource Development Institute, Bangladesh Jute Research Institute, Bangladesh Institute of Nuclear Agriculture, Bangladesh Rice Research Institute, and Bangladesh Sugarcrop Research Institute, are under the Ministry of Agriculture. Two research institutes are Bangladesh Fisheries Research Institute and Bangladesh Livestock Research Institute under Ministry of Fisheries and Livestock. The Bangladesh Tea Research Institute is under the Ministry of Industries. The Bangladesh Forest Research Institute is under the Ministry of Environment and Forest.
