= Ministry of Defence (Bangladesh) =

Government ministry of Bangladesh

- Bengali: প্রতিরক্ষা মন্ত্রণালয়
- Government Seal of Bangladesh

Ministry overview
- Formed: 14 April 1971; 55 years ago
- Jurisdiction: Government of Bangladesh
- Headquarters: Ganabhaban Complex, Sher-e-Bangla Nagar, Dhaka
- Annual budget: ৳42497 crore (US$3.5 billion) (2026-2027)
- Minister responsible: Tarique Rahman
- Minister of State responsible: AKM Shamsul Islam, Defence Adviser
- Ministry executive: Md. Ashraf Uddin, Defence Secretary
- Child Ministry: Bangladesh Armed Forces; Directorate General of Defence Purchase; Directorate General of Forces Intelligence
- Website: mod.gov.bd

The Ministry of Defence (MoD) (Bengali: প্রতিরক্ষা মন্ত্রণালয়, romanized: Pratirakṣā Montronaloy) is a ministry of the Government of Bangladesh responsible for defense policy, military administration, and national security. It serves as the principal government body overseeing the Bangladesh Armed Forces, including the Bangladesh Army, Bangladesh Navy, and Bangladesh Air Force.

== Organisational structure ==
The Jatiya Sangsad is constitutionally responsible for working with the President and the service chiefs in ensuring the nation's national security. In practice, however, members of the Jatiya Sangsad have never played a significant role in either national defence planning or defence budgeting, which instead is handled by the Defence Secretary.

== Agencies and departments under the Ministry of Defence ==
The list of agencies and departments under the Ministry of Defence of Bangladesh are given below:

=== Defence Forces ===
- Bangladesh Army
- Bangladesh Navy
- Bangladesh Air Force

=== Inter-Forces institutions ===
- Directorate General of Medical Services (DGMS)
- National Defence College (NDC)
- Defence Services Command and Staff College (DSCSC)
- Military Institute of Science and Technology (MIST)
- Armed Forces Medical College (AFMC)
- Armed Forces Medical Institute (AFMI)
- Armed Forces Institute of Pathology (AFIP)
- Bangladesh Ordnance Factories (BOF)
- Military Engineer Services (MES)
- Inter Services Selection Board (ISSB)
- Bangladesh Armed Services Board (BASB)
- Directorate General of Defence Purchase (DGDP)
- Directorate General of Forces Intelligence (DGFI)
- Inter-Services Public Relations (ISPR)
- Governing Bodies of Cadet Colleges

=== Other agencies and departments ===
- Bangladesh National Cadet Corps (BNCC)
- Bangladesh Meteorological Department (BMD)
- Bangladesh Space Research and Remote Sensing Organization (SPARRSO)
- Survey of Bangladesh (SOB)
- Department of Military Lands & Cantonments (DML&C)
- Department of Cipher
- Controller General of Defence Finance (CGDF)
- Office of Chief Administrative Officer (CAO)
- Ministry of Defence Constabulary (MODC)

== Role and Functions ==
The functions of the Ministry of Defence include:

- Protecting the sovereignty of Bangladesh.
- Defence Services of Bangladesh and Armed Forces attached to or operating with any of the Armed Forces of Bangladesh excluding planning, co-ordination and arrangement of mobilisation of the defence services on declaration of national emergency/war and co-ordination and control of the activities of the defence services when deployed in aid of civil administration.
- Army, Naval and Air Force Works
- Production of cypher documents
- Managing Bangladesh Ordnance Factories which produce ammunition and arms for Bangladesh Army.
- Matters related to International Red Cross and Geneva Conventions in so far as these affect belligerents.
- Gallantry awards and decorations in respect of forces under its control.
- Matters related to land owned by the Defense Forces, including Cantonments
- Meteorological Observations
- Pardons, reprieves and respites, etc., of all armed forces personnel
- Administering the National Services and Bangladesh National Cadet Corps (BNCC)
- Managing Bangladesh Cadet Colleges
- Matters relating to Space Research and Remote Sensing Organisation (SPARRSO)
- Civil Services paid from Defence Estimates
- Hydrographic Surveys and preparation of navigational charts (excluding Hydrographic surveys in the inland water of Bangladesh and preparation of charts for inland navigation).
- Conducting the Survey of Bangladesh.
- Budget legal and statutory matters of the Armed Forces.
- Secretarial administration including financial matters.
- Administration and control of subordinate offices and organisations under this ministry.
- Liaison with International Organisations and matters relating to treaties and agreements with other countries and world bodies relating to subject allotted to the ministry.
- All laws on subjects allotted to this ministry.
- Inquires and statistics on any of the subjects allotted to this ministry.
- Fees in respect of any of the subjects allotted to this ministry except fees taken in courts.

== List of Ministers, Advisers and State Ministers ==
Political parties

- Bangladesh Awami League
- Bangladesh Nationalist Party
- Jatiya Party (Ershad)

Other factions

- Independent

No.	Portrait	Officeholder (birth–death) Constituency	Term of office			Designation	Ministry
No.	Portrait	Officeholder (birth–death) Constituency	From	To	Period	Designation	Ministry
1		Sheikh Mujibur Rahman (1920–1975)	10 April 1971	15 August 1975	4 years, 127 days	President & Minister	Mujib I–II–III–IV
2		Ziaur Rahman (1936–1981)	21 April 1977	30 May 1981	4 years, 39 days	President	Zia
3		Hussain Muhammad Ershad (1930–2019)	24 March 1982	6 December 1990	8 years, 257 days	President	Ershad
4		Khaleda Zia (born 1945); MP for Feni-1	20 March 1991	30 March 1996	5 years, 10 days	Prime Minister	Khaleda I–II
5		Sheikh Hasina (born 1947); MP for Gopalganj-3	23 June 1996	15 July 2001	5 years, 22 days	Prime Minister	Hasina I
6		Khaleda Zia (born 1945); MP for Bogra-6	10 October 2001	29 October 2006	5 years, 19 days	Prime Minister	Khaleda III
7		Fakhruddin Ahmed (born 1940)	12 January 2007	6 January 2009	1 year, 360 days	Chief Adviser	Fakhruddin
8		Sheikh Hasina (born 1947); MP for Gopalganj-3	6 January 2009	5 August 2024	15 years, 212 days	Prime Minister	Hasina II–III–IV–V
9		Muhammad Yunus (born 1940)	8 August 2024	17 February 2026	1 year, 193 days	Chief Adviser	Yunus
10		Tarique Rahman (born 1968); MP for Dhaka-17	17 February 2026	Incumbent	187 days	Prime Minister	Tarique Ministry

== List of defence secretaries ==
Number	Name	Term start	Term end	Reference
1	Abdus Samad	18 December 1971	22 January 1972	
2	Osman Gani Khan	22 January 1972	6 June 1973	
3	Md. Mujibul Haque	6 June 1973	30 October 1975	
4	Faiz Uddin Ahmed	4 November 1975	18 September 1978	
5	ASHK Sadek	18 September 1978	21 April 1982	
6	Salahuddin Ahmed	21 April 1982	1 October 1983	
7	ASHK Sadek	1 November 1983	2 May 1985	
8	A.M. Anisuzzaman	29 June 1985	23 June 1986	
9	Kazi Jalal Uddin Ahmad	23 June 1986	1 January 1989	
10	Md. Shamsul Haque Chishti	1 January 1989	9 January 1990	
11	Mohammad Siddiqur Rahman	9 January 1990	25 April 1991	
12	Anisur Rahman	25 April 1991	6 August 1992	
13	M. A. Malek	1 September 1992	22 July 1993	
14	Md. Hasinur Rahman	22 July 1993	11 March 1995	
15	Md. Abdul Hakim	11 March 1995	31 July 1996	
16	Kazi Muhammad Manzoor e Mawla	1 August 1996	30 September 1997	
17	Syed Yusuf Hossain	14 July 1997	8 August 1999	
18	M. Idris Ali	16 August 1999	1 December 2001	
19	KM Ehsanul Haque Peyara	27 November 2001	5 August 2004	
20	Mejbah Uddin Ahmed	11 August 2004	28 February 2006	
21	Mahmud Hasan Mansoor	21 March 2006	8 June 2006	
22	Abu Md. Moniruzzaman Khan	18 June 2006	8 January 2007	
23	Kamrul Hasan	11 January 2007	8 February 2010	
24	Khondoker Md. Asaduzzaman	7 February 2010	3 March 2014	
25	Kazi Habibul Awal	3 March 2014	31 December 2016	
26	Akhtar Hossain Bhuiyan	1 January 2017	30 December 2019	
27	Abdullah al Mohsin Chowdhury	12 January 2020	29 June 2020	
28	Md Abu Hena Mostafa Kamal	7 July 2020	7 February 2022	
29	Golam Md Hasibul Alam	13 February 2022	30 March 2024	

== See also ==
- Armed Forces Division
- Bangladesh Army
- Bangladesh Navy
- Bangladesh Air Force
