= Ministry of Agriculture (Bangladesh) =

Government ministry of Bangladesh

- Bengali: কৃষি মন্ত্রণালয়
- Government Seal of Bangladesh

Ministry overview
- Formed: 12 January 1972; 54 years ago
- Jurisdiction: Government of Bangladesh
- Headquarters: Bangladesh Secretariat, Segunbagicha, Dhaka
- Annual budget: ৳28281 crore (US$2.3 billion) (2026-2027)
- Minister responsible: Amin ur Rashid Yasin, Minister for Agriculture
- Ministry executives: Dr. Mohammad Emdad Ullah Mian, Secretary
- Website: www.moa.gov.bd

The Ministry of Agriculture (Bengali: কৃষি মন্ত্রণালয়; Kr̥ṣi Mantraṇālaẏa) is a ministry of the Government of Bangladesh. It is the principal government body responsible for the formulation, implementation, and administration of policies, laws, rules, and regulations relating to Agriculture in Bangladesh.

The ministry plays a central role in ensuring food security, agricultural development, and sustainable use of agricultural resources in the country. Its functions include crop production, agricultural research and extension services, seed development, fertilizer management, irrigation coordination, pest control, and the promotion of modern farming technologies. The Ministry of Agriculture works in coordination with various attached departments, autonomous bodies, research institutions, and field-level offices to enhance agricultural productivity, support farmers’ livelihoods, and contribute to national economic growth and rural development.

== Directorate/ Agency ==
- Agriculture Information Service (AIS)
- Department of Agricultural Marketing
- Department of Agricultural Extension
- National Agriculture Training Academy (NATA)
- National Institute of Biotechnology
- Cotton Development Board
- Barind Multipurpose Development Authority
- Bangladesh Agricultural Development Corporation
- Bangladesh Agricultural Research Institute
- Bangladesh Agricultural Research Council
- Bangladesh Sugarcrop Research Institute (BSRI)
- Bangladesh Rice Research Institute
- Bangladesh Institute of Nuclear Agriculture
- Bangladesh Jute Research Institute (BJRI)
- Bangladesh Institute of Research and Training on Applied Nutrition (BIRTAN)
- Soil Resource Development Institute (SRDI)
- SAARC Agricultural Information Centre (SAC)
- Seed Certification Agency
- Horticulture Export Development Foundation (Hortex Foundation)
- Bangladesh Wheat and Maize Research Institute (BWMRI)
