= Mir Hasmat Ali =

Bangladeshi judge

Justice of the High Court Division of Bangladesh

Personal details
- Born: 21 December 1948 (age 77)
- Profession: Judge

Mir Hasmat Ali is a retired judge of the High Court Division of the Bangladesh Supreme Court.

== Career ==
Ali and 18 other judges filed an application with the Supreme Court against a High Court Verdict which ordered the government to restore 10 additional judges of the High Court Division to the court with seniority whose appointments were not confirmed by the Bangladesh Nationalist Party led government. The 10 additional judges were appointed to the court by the Awami League government. Ali and 17 other judges opposing the verdict were appointed by the Bangladesh Nationalist Party government.

Ali and Justice Shamim Hasnain declared the Voluntary Disclosure of Information Ordinance-2008 which created the Truth and Accountability Commission illegal in November 2008. The Truth and Accountability Commission was established on 30 July 2008 by the Fakhruddin Ahmed led Caretaker Government to increase the speed of corruption cases. The Caretaker Government had arrested numerous politicians including former Prime Ministers Sheikh Hasina and Khaleda Zia on corruption charges. The commission was made up of a former Judge of Bangladesh Supreme Court Justice Habibur Rahman Khan, retired Comptroller and Auditor General of Bangladesh Asif Ali, and a retired Major General Manzur Rashid Chowdhury from Bangladesh Army. Prime Minister Sheikh Hasina disclosed the names of 456 people who had confessed to the commission in April 2009.

Ali and Justice Shamim Hasnain granted bail to HBM Iqbal, Awami League member of parliament, in January 2009. In January 2009, Ali and Justice Shamim Hasnain declared illegal rules of the University of Dhaka that prevented Madrassah students for admission to seven departments of the university.
