= Shamim Hasnain =

Bangladeshi judge

Justice of the High Court Division of Bangladesh

Personal details
- Profession: Judge

Shamim Hasnain is a retired justice of the High Court Division of the Bangladesh Supreme Court.

== Career ==
In September 2003, Hasnain and Justice M. A. Matin rejected a contempt of court suit filed by Magistrate Khandker Fatema Begum against United News of Bangladesh, Bhorer Kagoj, and The Daily Star. The news organizations had reported that the magistrate saluted Mirza Abbas, minister for housing and public works, when he entered her court room as an accused in a defamation case.

Hasnain and Justice Mir Hasmat Ali declared the Voluntary Disclosure of Information Ordinance-2008 which created the Truth and Accountability Commission illegal in November 2008. The Truth and Accountability Commission was established on 30 July 2008 by the Fakhruddin Ahmed led caretaker government to increase the speed of corruption cases. The caretaker government had arrested numerous politicians including former prime ministers Sheikh Hasina and Khaleda Zia on corruption charges. The commission was made up of a former judge of Bangladesh Supreme Court Justice Habibur Rahman Khan, retired comptroller and auditor general of Bangladesh Asif Ali, and a retired major general, Manzur Rashid Chowdhury, from the Bangladesh Army. Prime Minister Sheikh Hasina disclosed the names of 456 people who had confessed to the commission in April 2009.

In January 2009, Hasnain and Justice Mir Hasmat Ali declared illegal rules of the University of Dhaka that prevented madrassah students for admission to seven departments of the university.

Hasnain and Justice MR Hasan granted bail to Bangladesh Jamaat-e Islami leaders in a case filed over assaulting police officers during a clash between the party and police in April 2011.

Hasnain was a defense witness for Salauddin Quader Chowdhury appeal against his conviction for war crimes during the Bangladesh Liberation War in 2017. His mother, Zinnat Ara Begum, had written a statement in favor of Chowdhury at his initial trial.

Hasnain retired in April 2017.
