= Md. Nurul Islam (auditor) =

13th Comptroller and Auditor General of Bangladesh

- মো. নুরুল ইসলাম
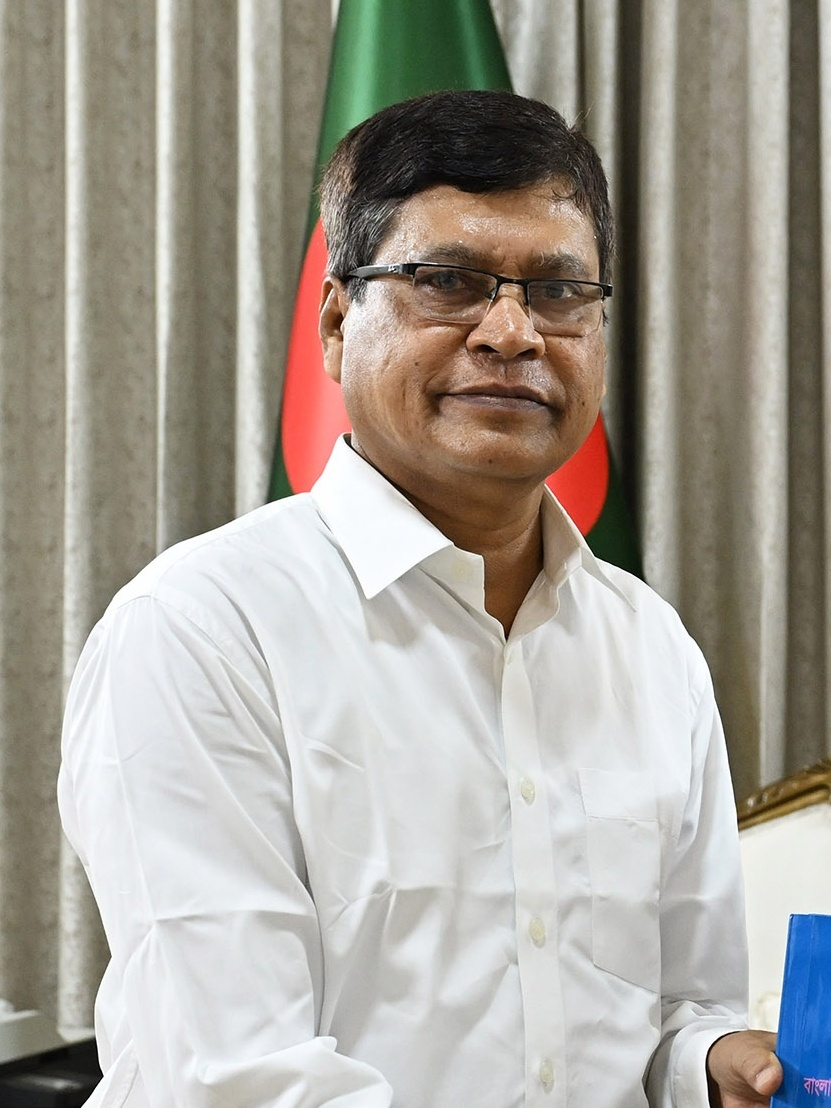
- Nurul in 2025

13th Comptroller and Auditor General of Bangladesh
- Incumbent
- Assumed office 26 July 2023
- Appointed by: President of Bangladesh

Personal details
- Education: BSS, MSS (Public Administration), University of Dhaka

Md. Nurul Islam is the 13th Comptroller and Auditor General of Bangladesh.

== Early life ==
Islam graduated from Notre Dame College, Dhaka in 1981. He did his bachelor's degree and masters in Social Sciences from the University of Dhaka in 1984 and 1985 respectively.

== Career ==
Islam joined the Bangladesh Civil Service in the 8th batch as an Audit and Accounts cadre on 20 December 1989.

Islam has served as the Controller General of Defence Finance. He was the Senior Finance Controller of Bangladesh Army in the Defense Finance Department. He was Additional Director General of Finance of Bangladesh Railway.

Islam established One-Stop Service Cells throughout Bangladesh for pensioners. The Ministry of Finance awarded Islam with the National Integrity Award in 2022.

On 26 July 2023, Islam was appointed the Comptroller and Auditor General of Bangladesh. At the time of his appointment, he was the Controller General of Accounts since January 2021. He replaced Mohammad Muslim Chowdhury. He paid tribute at the shrine of former President Sheikh Mujibur Rahman in Tungipara after his appointment.
