= Muhammad Ahsan Ali Sarkar =

8th Comptroller and Auditor General of Bangladesh

Muhammad Ahsan Ali Sarkar is the 8th Comptroller and Auditor General of Bangladesh.

== Career ==
Sarkar worked as an English lecturer at Rajshahi College. In 1967, he joined the Audit & Accounts Service of the Central Superior Services.

In 1995, Sarkar was the Additional Secretary of the Ministry of Agriculture. He was the secretary of the Ministry of Labour and Employment.

Sarker was Bangladesh's Comptroller and Auditor General from 5 March 2002 to 31 December 2002. He was succeeded by Asif Ali.
