= Kamrul Hasan (secretary) =

Bangladeshi civil servant

- Occupation: Former civil servant

Kamrul Hasan is a retired civil servant and former secretary of the Ministry of Defence of Bangladesh. He was the secretary at the Ministry of Fisheries and Livestock.

== Career ==
Hasan was the joint secretary of the Economic Relations Division in 2003.

In October 2006, Hasan was promoted to secretary at the Ministry of Fisheries and Livestock in the last five days of the Bangladesh Nationalist Party-Bangladesh Jamaat-i-Islami alliance government along with the transfer, promotion, and termination of 300 government officials.

Hasan was appointed the Secretary of Defence on 11 January 2007 replacing Abu Md. Moniruzzaman Khan. He was serving as the secretary of the Ministry of Fisheries and Livestock. In May 2007, he saw the promotion of the Army chief to a four star general, navy chief to Vice Admiral, and air force chief to Air Marshal. He received Pakistan Air Force Chief Marshal Tanvir Mahmood Ahmed in April 2008 and President Iajuddin Ahmed hoped ties between the two countries would improve. He inaugurated the Khepupara Radar Station. He met with a delegation of National Defence University, Pakistan in May 2008. He inaugurated Space Research and Remote Sensing Organisation's satellite ground station which would use the feed from FY-2C, a Chinese satellite.

Hasan served as the Defence Secretary till 8 February 2010 before being replaced by Khondoker Md. Asaduzzaman.
