= Seed Certification Agency =

- Formation: 22 January 1974
- Headquarters: Gazipur, Bangladesh
- Region served: Bangladesh
- Official language: Bengali
- Website: sca.gov.bd

The Seed Certification Agency is an autonomous government agency responsible for the certification of agricultural seeds in Bangladesh and is located in Gazipur, Bangladesh. It is also responsible for quality control of seeds in the market. It is under the Ministry of Agriculture.

== History ==
The Seed Certification Agency was established on 22 January 1974 by the government of Bangladesh as part of the First National Five Year Plan (1973–1978). It has 7 regional offices for 7 divisions of Bangladesh and 64 offices in all 64 districts of Bangladesh. It initially only certified seeds produced by the Bangladesh Agricultural Development Corporation but now also certifies seeds of private firms.
