= Citrus Research Station =

Agricultural research station in Bangladesh

Citrus Research Station সাইট্রাস গবেষনা কেন্দ্র
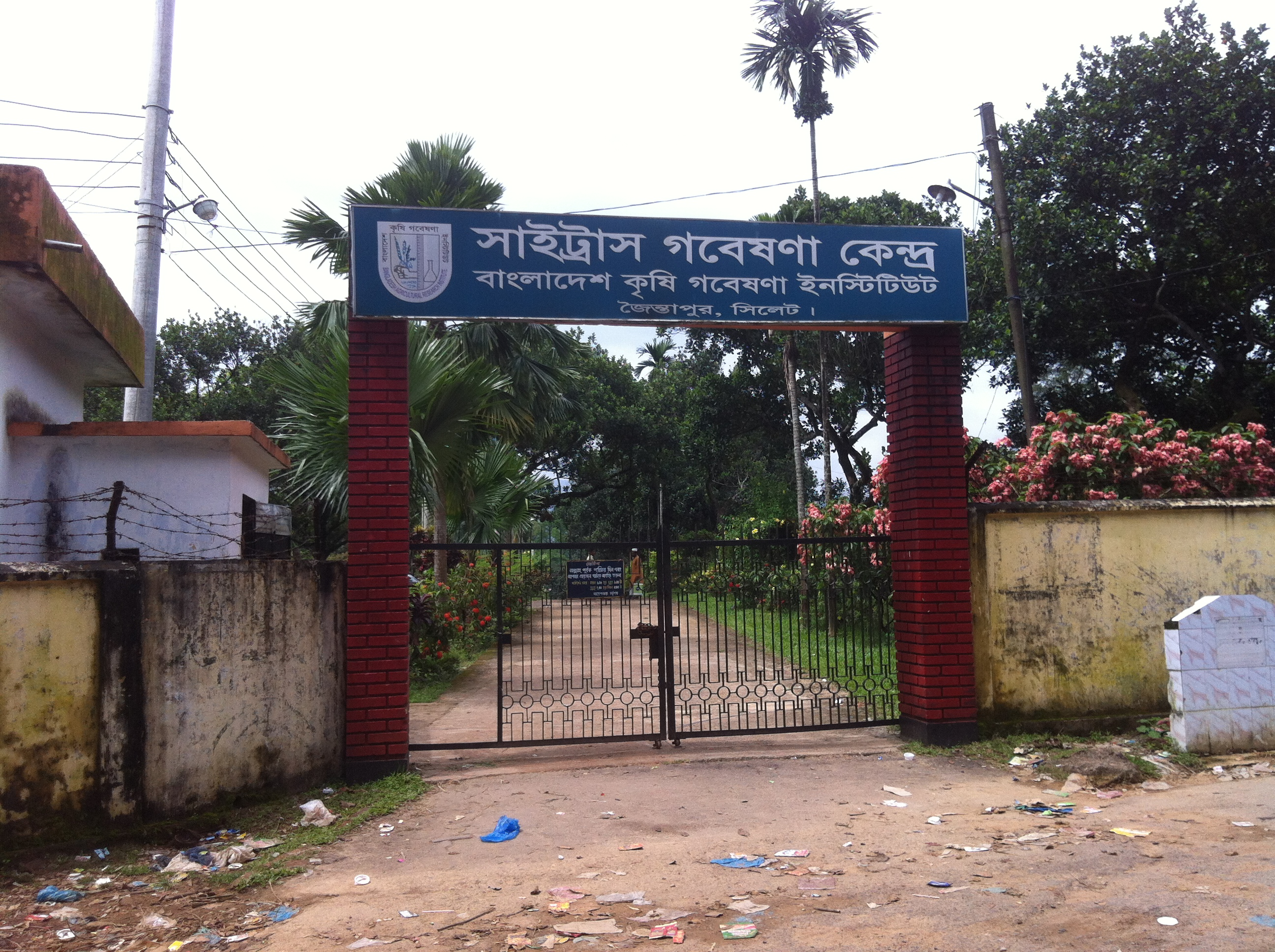
- Citrus Research Station, Jaintapur, Sylhet
- Formation: 1960-61
- Headquarters: Jaintiapur Upazila, Sylhet District, Bangladesh
- Region served: Bangladesh
- Official language: Bengali
- Parent organization: Bangladesh Agricultural Research Institute
- Website: www.bari.gov.bd

Citrus Research Station (Bengali: সাইট্রাস গবেষনা কেন্দ্র, romanized: Citrus Gobeshona Kendro) is an agricultural research station under the Bangladesh Agricultural Research Institute (BARI). It is located in Jaintiapur, in the Sylhet District of Bangladesh.

== History ==
A project called the Organization of Horticulture Section was started in 1951 under the Agricultural Programme to conduct research programmes. Under this project, a substation was established in 1954 on 5.00 acres of land in Chailakhal, Tamabil. The purpose was to collect and evaluate the selection and acceptance of various fruit trees from different regions of Bangladesh (then East Pakistan) and to cultivate them at the field level. Later, as part of the programme, a fruit development station was established in 1960-61 on 21.46 hectares of land in Jaintapur. It was established to conduct research on fruits, especially the citrus.

In 1961-1965, another 26.32 hectares of land was acquired for the centre and a project of pepper farming was started from that time on. The substation of Chailakhal was shifted to Jaintapur in 1970 and was assimilated to the centre. Then in 1976, when Bangladesh Agricultural Research Institute was established as an autonomous institution, the fruit development centre became a subsidiary of the institution.

== Invention ==
The Citrus Station has so far developed 6 fruits and 1 spice. In 2019, a new variety of Zara (one type of lemon) was invented called Bari-1 by this station. Besides, 1 Malta, and 1 Lotcon species have also been invented.
