= Barind Multipurpose Development Authority =

Bangladeshi government agency

- Formation: 1992
- Headquarters: Rajshahi, Bangladesh
- Region served: Bangladesh
- Official language: Bengali
- Website: Barind Multipurpose Development Authority

Barind Multipurpose Development Authority (Bengali: বরেন্দ্র বহুমুখী উন্নয়ন কর্তৃপক্ষ) is a Bangladesh government development authority under the Ministry of Agriculture responsible for development of Barind Tract in northwestern Bangladesh, covering an area of approximately 10,000 square kilometres (3,900 sq mi). Begum Akhter Jahan is chairman of the authority.

== History ==
Barind Integrated Area Development Project was established in 1985 to develop the Barind Tract under the authority of Bangladesh Agricultural Development Corporation. The project was completed in 1990 and had only used 26 percent of its original budget. On 15 June 1992 the project was reconstituted as the Barind Multipurpose Development Authority under the Ministry of Agriculture.
