= Horticulture Export Development Foundation =

Agency overview
- Formed: 1993
- Headquarters: Sech Bhaban, 22 Manik Mia Avenue, Sher-e-Bangla Nagar, Dhaka-1207, Bangladesh
- Parent agency: Ministry of Agriculture
- Website: www.hortex.org

Horticulture Export Development Foundation (Hortex Foundation) (Bengali: হর্টিকালচার এক্সপোর্ট ডেভেলপমেন্ট ফাউন্ডেশন (হর্টেক্স ফাউন্ডেশন)) is a government foundation under the Ministry of Agriculture. The head office of Hortex Foundation is in Dhaka, Bangladesh.

The Hortex Foundation works to develop and promote agribusiness, including high value agricultural products for export through technical and advisory support to increase the national economy of Bangladesh and farmers' income.

== Activities ==
The Hortex Foundation organizes various seminars to increase the export of agricultural products. On 10 November 2020, the Hortex Foundation organized a seminar on 'Consultation Workshop on Modern Pack House Facilities and Accredited Laboratory Construction' in the auditorium of Bangladesh Agricultural Research Council. The seminar was attended by experts from various universities, research institutes, Researcher, Fruit and Vegetable Exporters Association, Value Chain Expert, Laboratory Expert / Scientists.

== বহিঃসংযোগ ==
- Official website of the Hortex Foundation
