= Md. Ashraf Uddin =

Bangladeshi civil servant

- মো. আশরাফ উদ্দিন
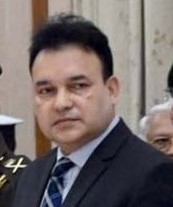
- Md. Ashraf Uddin, Defence Secretary of Bangladesh, during the rank badge ceremony of General Waker-uz-Zaman on 23 June 2024.

Defence Secretary of Bangladesh
- Incumbent
- Assumed office 30 May 2024
- Prime Minister: Sheikh Hasina; Muhammad Yunus (as Chief Adviser); Tarique Rahman
- Preceded by: Golam Md. Hasibul Alam

Personal details
- Citizenship: Bangladesh
- Education: University of Dhaka
- Occupation: Civil servant, Secretary

Md. Ashraf Uddin is a Bangladeshi civil servant and the secretary of Ministry of Defence. He is the former director general of the Department of Environment.

== Career ==
Uddin was the Deputy Commissioner of Gaibandha District in 2015. He later served as the Deputy Commissioner of Bogra District. He received a petition from the Shoketon Nagorik Shomaj asking the district administration to preserve the recently sold Bogra Nawab palace, a 150 year old historic structure. He later served as the Deputy Commissioner of Jessore District.

In 2022, Uddin was the director general of the Department of Environment when Transparency International Bangladesh accused the Department of providing environmental certificates to factories in return for bribes. He was a director of the monitoring and enforcement cell at the Department of Environment when he looked at environmental clearance of resorts in Gazipur. He then served as the additional director of the Field Services Wing of the Department of Agricultural Extension.

Uddin was the Division Commissioner of Chittagong Division. He established an investigation team for the 2022 Sitakunda fire at the BM Container Depot. He attended an event on reforms for the constitution and legal system of Bangladesh in November 2022 as the chief guest where speakers included Shahdeen Malik, Asif Nazrul, and Syeda Rizwana Hasan. Rizwana called the meeting the foundation of the "reform process" while Uddin said, "Government officials should also read the Constitution regularly to stay aware of the rights of the people,".

Uddin was appointed secretary of the Ministry of Defence on 30 May 2024. He is a member of the governing body of the National Defence College. He served during the fall of the Sheikh Hasina led Awami League government and it's replaced by a Bangladesh Army backed Interim government led by Muhammad Yunus. In January 2025, he received a seven-member delegation led by retired Brigadier General Md Hasan Nasir who called on Uddin to establish an independent Military Reform Commission.
