= 2026 Bangladesh crop damage =

Agricultural crisis in South Asia

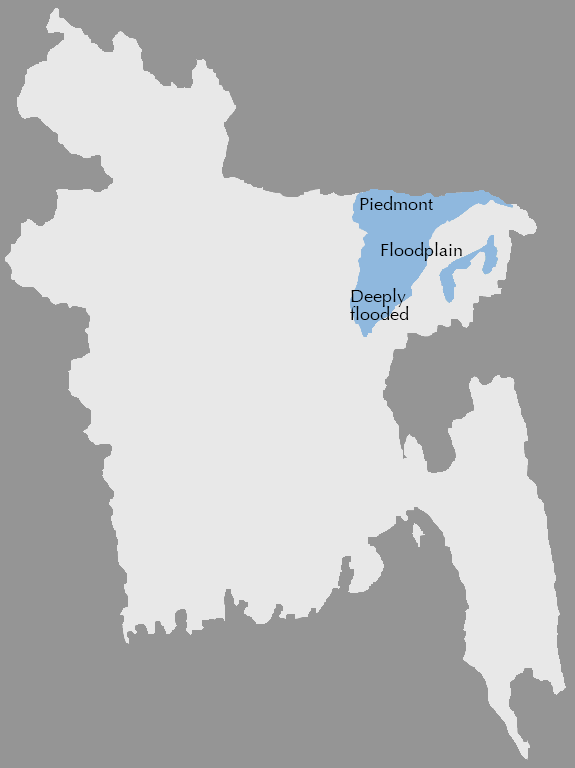
- The haor basin in the northeastern Bangladesh, where the damages occurred mostly
- Date: April–May 2026
- Location: Northeastern Bangladesh Divisions of; Dhaka; Chittagong; Sylhet; Mymensingh
- Type: Agricultural crisis
- Cause: Heavy pre-monsoon rainfall; Flash floods; Upstream water inflows
- Outcome: 46,000 hectares paddy fields submerged in the rising water; Shortfall of 200,000 metric ton national rice production

An agricultural crisis hit Bangladesh between April and May 2026 due to extensive damage of boro rice crops. Caused by heavy pre-monsoon rainfall, flash floods, and upstream water inflows, across the haor basin of northeastern region, the crisis raised concerns over national rice supplies.

== Background ==
Boro rice is Bangladesh's largest seasonal rice crop and accounts for more than half of the country's annual rice production. The haor basin in northeastern Bangladesh is highly vulnerable to sudden flooding caused by heavy rainfall and upstream water from India's Meghalaya and Assam states.

== Damage ==
Beginning in late April 2026, continuous rainfall and upstream water inflows caused rivers in northeastern Bangladesh to overflow, inundating standing boro fields during the peak harvesting season.

According to the Department of Agricultural Extension, more than 46,000 hectares of standing boro crops were submerged across haor districts including Sunamganj, Kishoreganj, Netrokona, Habiganj, Sylhet, Moulvibazar, and Brahmanbaria Districts.

In Habiganj alone, approximately 45 percent of boro farmland in six upazilas was submerged. Local agricultural officials estimated that between 10,000 and 12,000 hectares of paddy fields were damaged in the district. Around 20,000 farmers in Habiganj were reported to have been affected by the flooding.

== Farmers' response ==
Farmers in flooded haor areas attempted to harvest rice using small boats and traditional scythes while standing in waist-deep water. Some farmers reported cutting rice by estimation because the crop was completely underwater.

== Economic impact ==
Reuters estimated that the flooding could result in a national rice production shortfall of more than 200,000 metric tons. Analysts warned that crop losses could tighten domestic rice supplies and increase market prices.

== Government response ==
The government of Bangladesh announced at least three months of assistance for affected farmers in the haor region. Agricultural authorities also began preparing lists of affected farmers for rehabilitation and support programs.
