= Ahmed Ataul Hakeem =

Bengali civil servant

Ahmed Ataul Hakeem is a retired civil servant and he was the 10th Comptroller and Auditor General of Bangladesh. He is Controller of Examinations of BRAC University.

== Early life ==
Hakeem studied at Mirzapur Cadet College from 1965 to 1970. He did his bachelor's degree and masters in economics from the University of Dhaka in 1973 and 1974 respectively. He did a second masters in social sciences from the University of Birmingham in 1987.

== Career ==
Hakeem joined the Bangladesh Civil Service in March 1979 as an Audit and Accounts Cadre.

Hakeem was the first Chief Accounts Officer of Bangladesh. He was the deputy secretary of the Finance Division of the Ministry of Finance from 1991 to 1997. In 1997, he was appointed the Director General of the Audit Department. He served as the head of the Financial Management Academy for five years.

Hakeem served as the Deputy Comptroller and Auditor General of Bangladesh from 2004 to 2005.

From 12 February 2008 to 11 February 2013, Hakeem served as the 10th Comptroller and Auditor General of Bangladesh. He replaced Asif Ali and sworn in by Chief Justice M Ruhul Amin. From 2009 to 2012, he was a member of the governing board of Asian Association of Supreme Audit Institutions. In April 2009, he presented the audit report to Sheikh Hasina.

In January 2012, Hakeem was placed in the Search Committee for the commissioners of the Bangladesh Election Commission. In December 2012, Hakeem presented the audit report to Sheikh Hasina. He had raised 605 objections over irregularities worth 48.11 billion BDT. The Public Accounts Committee is responsible for taking action based on the report. In February 2013, he launched digital audit management system for the Office of the Comptroller and Auditor General. In April 2013, Masud Ahmed replaced him as auditor general of Bangladesh.

From December 2013 to November 2017, Hakeem was an ombudsman at BRAC. In January 2018, he was appointed Controller of Examinations at BRAC University. He was a part time lecturer at Notre Dame College, Dhaka. He is a member of the Officers Club, Dhaka. He is a member of the Institute of Chartered Accountants of Bangladesh.

On 23 December 2019, Hakeem joined the General Board of RDRS Bangladesh.

In September 2022, Hakeem in an interview with The Business Standard disagreed with the US Fiscal Transparency Report of the United States Department of State which described the audit department of Bangladesh as not up to international standards.
