= Truth and Accountability Commission =

- Formation: 30 July 2008
- Headquarters: Dhaka, Bangladesh
- Region served: Bangladesh
- Official language: Bengali

The Truth and Accountability Commission (Bengali: সত্য ও জবাবদিহি কমিশন), also known as the Truth Commission, was a Bangladesh government regulatory commission formed by the Fakhruddin Ahmed led caretaker government to investigate corruption. It was eventually declared illegal by the courts. The commission was headed by Justice Habibur Rahman Khan.

== History ==
The Truth and Accountability Commission was established on 30 July 2008 by the Fakhruddin Ahmed led caretaker government to increase the speed of corruption cases. The caretaker government had arrested numerous politicians including former prime ministers Sheikh Hasina and Khaleda Zia on corruption charges. The commission was made up of a former judge of the Bangladesh Supreme Court, Justice Habibur Rahman Khan, retired comptroller and auditor general Asif Ali, and a retired major general, Manzur Rashid Chowdhury from the Bangladesh Army.

The commission had the authority to provide immunity to those who confessed to corruption and give their ill-gotten wealth to the government. During the commission's short lived life 448 people confessed and deposited 340 million taka in the government treasury. Transparency International Bangladesh noted that the commission collected arbitrary amounts as fines from corruption suspects. Former president Hussain Muhammad Ershad in an opinion piece in The Daily Star described the commission as "impractical". The amount reported by suspects and deposited by them was only a small fraction of the amount the Anti-Corruption Commission estimated they had stolen.

On 25 August 2008, Supreme Court of Bangladesh lawyers and politicians filed petitions challenging the legality of the commission based on the argument that only courts are authorized to give verdicts according to the Constitution of Bangladesh. On 13 November 2008, Bangladesh High Court declared the Truth and Accountability Commission illegal. The verdict was delivered by justices Mir Hasmat Ali and Shamim Hasnain. Prime Minister Sheikh Hasina disclosed the names of 456 people who had confessed to the commission in April 2009.
