= Fazle Kader Muhammad Abdul Baqui =

First Comptroller and Auditor General of Bangladesh

- ফজলে কাদের মুহাম্মদ আব্দুল বাকী
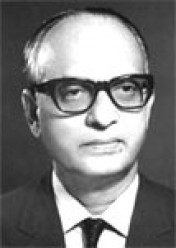

1st Comptroller and Auditor General (Bangladesh)
- In office 11 May 1973 – 31 December 1975
- Succeeded by: Osman Ghani Khan

Personal details
- Born: 1 January 1916
- Died: 2017
- Education: University of Calcutta; University of Dhaka

Fazle Kader Muhammad Abdul Baqui (1 January 1916-2017) was the first Comptroller and Auditor General of Bangladesh.

== Early life ==
Abdul Baqui was born on 1 January 1916. He did his bachelor's degree in economics at University of Calcutta and masters in English at the University of Dhaka.

== Career ==
Abdul Baqui joined the administrative service on 28 December 1943.

Abdul Baqui was the financial advisor of Jute Trading Corporation. He was the general manager of the House Building Finance Corporation. He was a director of Trading Corporation of Pakistan. He was the deputy account general of East Pakistan.

Abdul Baqui was appointed the first Comptroller and Auditor General of Bangladesh on 11 May 1973. He served as the Comptroller and Auditor General till 31 December 1975.

== Personal life ==
Abdul Baqui was the elder brother of F K M A Munim. He passed away in 2017 leaving his wife and three daughters.
