= Wheat Research Centre =

Government Agency of Bangladesh

- Formation: July 1980
- Headquarters: Dinajpur, Bangladesh
- Region served: Bangladesh
- Official language: Bengali
- Website: Wheat Research Centre

Wheat Research Centre was an autonomous national research institute that researches the production and cultivation of wheat in Bangladesh and is located in Nashipur, Dinajpur, Bangladesh. Dr Naresh Chandra Dev Barma is the head of the centre.

== History ==
Wheat Research Centre traces its origins to the Accelerated Wheat Research Programme for Bangladesh which was founded in 1971 and ended in June 1975. It was revived as the Expanded Wheat Research Programme. Wheat Research Centre was established in July 1980 under the Bangladesh Agricultural Research Institute. It is one of six research centres under the Bangladesh Agricultural Research Institute. It has released wheats by their own crosses and introduced some developed lines from International Maize and Wheat Improvement Center. From 1975 to 1985 wheat varieties released by the centre contributed to a 30 to 40 percent growth in wheat output in Bangladesh. The centre is responsible for preventing wheat blast damage to corps and supporting farmers. It was disestablished in 2017 and converted to the Bangladesh Wheat and Maize Research Institute.
