= Golam Md Hasibul Alam =

Bangladeshi politician

- Born: 1964 (age 61–62); Nilphamari District, East Pakistan, Pakistan
- Education: University of Dhaka
- Occupations: Politician, civil servant
- Spouse: Sharmin Amin Choudhury

Golam Md Hashibul Alam is a retired Bangladeshi civil servant and former senior secretary of the Ministry of Defence.

== Early life ==
Hasibul Alam was born in 1964 in Nilphamari District, East Pakistan, Pakistan. He is married to Sharmin Amin Choudhury. He completed his master's in English literature from the University of Dhaka.

== Career ==
Hasibul Alam joined the Bangladesh Civil Service as an administration cadre in 1989 and started as a land commissioner. He held a number of field level administration posts including land acquisition officer and upazila nirbahi officer. He served as senior assistant secretary at the Economic Relations Division. He is a former deputy commissioner (DC) of Patuakhali District in 2011 where he oversaw removal of illegal structures from Kuakata Beach.

On 18 December 2013, Hasibul Alam was transferred from officer on special duty to the Economic Relations Division as joint secretary.

Hasibul Alam joined the Ministry of Primary and Mass Education as an additional secretary. He worked at International Fund for Agricultural Development as its country resource officer on deputation from the government of Bangladesh. On 25 October 2020, Hasibul Alam was appointed Secretary of the Ministry of Primary and Mass Education. He had been serving as the chairman of the National Skills Development Authority. On 10 February 2021, Alam announced plans to vaccinate all primary school teachers in Bangladesh within one week. In September 2021, numerous media reports alleged officers of the ministry were transferring because of Hasibul Alam's behavior problems. The minister, Md Zakir Hossain, defended Hasibul Alam in a joint press conference with him.

On 13 February 2022, Hasibul Alam was appointed secretary of the Ministry of Defence. He was the chief guest at the World Meteorological Day-2022 summit in Dhaka. He went to retirement in May 2024.
