= Pakistan Armed Services Board =

- Formation: 1919
- Type: Welfare Organization
- Legal status: Active
- Purpose: Assist soldiers, sailors, and airmen who have served in various capacities in the armed forces
- Headquarters: Rawalpindi, Punjab, Pakistan
- Region served: Pakistan
- Director General: Maj Gen Nayyar Naseer HI(M)
- Website: pasb.mod.gov.pk

The Pakistan Armed Services Board (PASB) is a welfare organization department under the Ministry of Defence in Pakistan. It was established to assist soldiers, sailors and airmen serving in various capacities in the armed forces.

== History ==
The PASB was initially established as the Soldiers, Sailors and Airmen's Board in Bombay, Rawalpindi and Sheikhupura in 1919 after World War I. The British Raj established the Soldiers, Sailors and Airmen Board to look after the welfare of retired and serving personnel in India. After the Partition of India it was renamed to Pakistan Armed Services Board which split into the Bangladesh Armed Services Board after the Independence of Bangladesh in 1971. The Board has expanded from 28 District Armed Services Boards (DASBs) in 1947 to 63 DASBs.

== Functions ==
PASB provides various services including processing of cases, provision of general family pension, and special financial assistance from the Regimental Centre. It also provides guidelines for pensioners and administers a 2% disability quota.

== Infrastructure development ==
In December 2020, the Director General of PASB allocated a grant of Rs 850,000 for the construction of a boundary wall to secure the Defense Armed Services Board (DASB) office and land. However, DC Gujarat stopped the construction following which ex-servicemen protested.

== Controversies ==
=== Corruption allegations ===
In November 2011, a document from the Ministry of Defence disclosed the supposed participation of nearly a hundred military officers in dishonest activities. This disclosure came after the Public Accounts Committee’s announcement that three high-ranking military generals were accountable for the losses of Rs1.8 billion in the scam involving the National Logistics Cell. Among the 88 officials charged with corruption was a high-ranking officer from the Pakistan Armed Services Board.

=== Financial irregularities ===
In October 2022, an audit conducted by the Auditor General of Pakistan (AGP) of MEO Quetta uncovered a discrepancy amounting to Rs 82 million in the construction of the commercial plaza by the Pakistan Armed Services Board (PASB). A parcel of land, spanning 1,517.52 square meters, was leased to the PASB for 30 years for the construction of a Soldier House in Quetta. Contrary to this, the land was utilized for the erection of a commercial plaza without obtaining the necessary governmental consent, an act that is unlawful and contravenes the Cantonment Land Administration (CLA) regulations.

== See also ==
- Bangladesh Armed Services Board
