= Mango Research Station =

Bangladeshi research center

- Formation: 1985
- Headquarters: Chapainawabganj District, Bangladesh
- Region served: Bangladesh
- Official language: Bengali

The Mango Research Station (Bengali: আম গবেষণা কেন্দ্র) is a Bangladesh government owned research centre specializing in the research of mango production and development. The centre has developed 12 hybrid species of mango in Bangladesh.

== History ==
The Mango Research Station was established in 1985. It is administered by the Horticulture Division of Bangladesh Agricultural Research Institute. It is located on a 30-acre campus in Chapainawabganj District. It is led by a chief scientific officer.

In September 2020, the centre announced the development of Bari Mango-13, a new variety of hybrid mango developed using mangoes from Bangladesh and Florida. Jamir Uddin, Chief Scientific Officer of the centre stated that research was started in 2005.
