= Agriculture Information Service =

Government agency of Bangladesh

- Formation: 1985
- Headquarters: Dhaka, Bangladesh
- Region served: Bangladesh
- Official language: Bengali
- Website: www.ais.gov.bd

The Agriculture Information Service (Bengali: কৃষি তথ্য সার্ভিস) is a Bangladesh government agency under the Ministry of Agriculture responsible for proving information on modern agricultural methods to farmers in the country. Nurul Islam is the director of the agency.

== History ==
The Agriculture Information Service traces its origin to the Agriculture Information Agency which was founded in 1965. In 1985, the Government of Bangladesh re-organized the Agriculture Information Agency into the Agriculture Information Service. The agency publishes two journals, Krishikotha and Samprosharon Barta. It also produces Mati-O-Manush and Banglar Krishi programs on Bangladesh Television. The agency also produces programs for Bangladesh Betar, the public radio broadcaster, and community radios. It operates a call center were farmers can call for information on agriculture.
