= Khondkar Moazzamuddin Hossain =

5th Comptroller and Auditor General of Bangladesh

Khondkar Moazzamuddin Hossain is the 5th Comptroller and Auditor General of Bangladesh.

== Early life ==
Hossain was born in 1936. After completing his bachelor's and master's in Islamic History and Culture from the University of Dhaka, he joined the Pakistan Railway Accounts Service.

== Career ==
Hossain was appointed deputy secretary of the Ministry of Finance in Independent Bangladesh.

On 7 March 1992, Hossain was appointed Bangladesh's Comptroller and Auditor General replacing Gholam Kibria. In 1993, the government of Bangladesh nominated Hossain to be an external auditor of UNESCO.

On 3 April 1996, M Hafizuddin Khan replaced Hossain as the Comptroller and Auditor General.
