= Department of Agricultural Marketing =

Bangladeshi governmental department

- Formation: 1982
- Headquarters: Dhaka, Bangladesh
- Region served: Bangladesh
- Official language: Bengali
- Website: www.dam.gov.bd

Department of Agricultural Marketing (Bengali: কৃষি বিপণন অধিদপ্তর) is a government department responsible for marketing agricultural products and techniques in Bangladesh and is located in Dhaka, Bangladesh. It is under the Ministry of Agriculture.

== History ==
Department of Agricultural Marketing traces its origin to the Marketing department proposed in 1934 and founded in 1935 in East Bengal, British Raj. In 1943 it was placed under the Department of Agriculture and Industries. In 1954, the Government of East Pakistan organized it as the Directorate of Agricultural Marketing under the Department of Agriculture, Cooperation, and Relief. In 1960 the provincial restructuring committee created sub-divisional and district level offices of the department. In 1982 an organizing committee led by Brigadier General Enamul Haque Khan advised the government to change it to the Department of Agricultural Marketing and increase its importance in the government. On 9 January 2006, the department launched the www.dam.gov.bd website as part of an effort by the government to introduce more e-governance.
