= Department of Cipher =

- Formation: 1972
- Headquarters: Dhaka, Bangladesh
- Region served: Bangladesh
- Official language: Bengali
- Website: doc.portal.gov.bd

Department of Cipher (Bengali: গুপ্তসংকেত পরিদপ্তর) is a specialized department of the Government of Bangladesh under the Ministry of Defence responsible for all encrypted and confidential communications.

== History ==
The Department of Cipher works with the Cabinet Division, Ministry of Home Affairs, Ministry of Foreign Affairs, Bangladesh Army, Bangladesh Navy, Bangladesh Air Force, Directorate General of Forces Intelligence, Border Guard Bangladesh, Bangladesh Coast Guard, National Security Intelligence, Bangladesh Police, District Superintendent of Bangladesh Police, Divisional Commissioners, and Deputy Commissioners.

In December 2016, the Parliamentary Standing Committee on Ministry of Defence recommended the government make changes to the Department of Cipher to prevent the loss of skilled individuals due to lack of promotions and opportunities in the department.
