= Masud Ahmed =

Bangladeshi author

Masud Ahmed is a retired bureaucrat and former comptroller and auditor general of Bangladesh. He is an author and novelist.

== Early life ==
Ahmed was born in 1955 in Jamalpur District, East Pakistan, Pakistan.

== Career ==
Ahmed joined the Audit and Accounts Cadre of the Bangladesh Civil Service in 1981. He was stationed as assistant accountant general. He worked as the deputy accountant general. He served as the chief accounts officer of the Ministry of Local Government, Rural Development and Co-operatives and the Ministry of Foreign Affairs. He served as the director of Defence Audit Directorate. He is a former managing director of Bangladesh Freedom Fighter Welfare Trust.

Ahmed was the deputy secretary of the Ministry of Shipping. He served as the deputy secretary of the Economic Relations Division. As joint secretary, he was the member in charge of finance of the Bangladesh Export Processing Zone Authority. He is a former managing director of Muktijoddha Kalyan Trust. He is a former director general of Bureau of Manpower, Employment and Training. He was the secretary of the Ministry of Chittagong Hill Tracts Affairs. He served as a member of the Bangladesh Planning Commission.

On 28 April 2013, Ahmed was appointed the comptroller and auditor general of Bangladesh. He oversaw the first performance audit of Bangladesh taking into consideration climate. He was a member of the 2017 search committee of the Bangladesh Election Commission. He served as the comptroller and auditor general of Bangladesh till 26 April 2018. He was succeeded by Mohammad Muslim Chowdhury.

Ahmed has published seven novels, 100 short stories, and wrote the story of eight television films. He won the Sher-e-Bangla AK Fazlul Huq Literary Award for his writing. Indira Gandhi Culture Centre held an event on his songs in November 2015.
