= BARI High School =

Coordinates: 23.9910°N 90.4159°E

BARI High School BARI high school
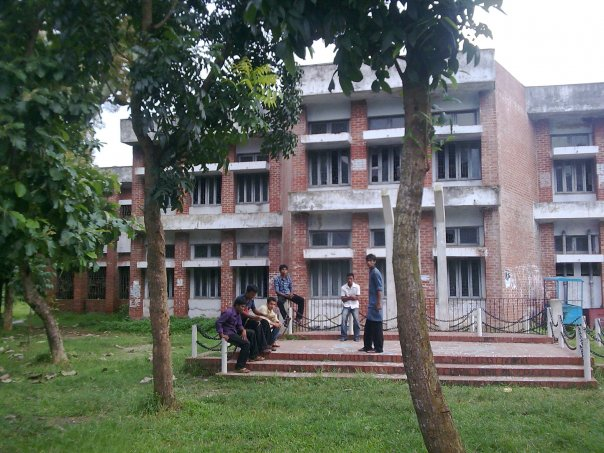

Location
- Bangladesh

Information
- Type: Semi-private secondary school
- Established: 1980

Bangladesh Agricultural Research Institute High School (BARI High School) is a semi-private secondary school at the Bangladesh Agricultural Research Institute (BARI), Gazipur Sadar Upazila, Bangladesh. It provides primary and secondary school level education for the residents of Bangladesh Agricultural Research Institute and other students in the peripheral area. The school was established in 1980, with a permanent building in the heart of Bangladesh Agricultural Research Institute.
