= Syed Yusuf Hossain =

Former government official

Syed Yusuf Hossain (Bengali: সৈয়দ ইউসুফ হোসেন) is a former government official who held various positions in the government of Bangladesh. He served as the comptroller and auditor general, the defense secretary and the chairman of the Bangladesh Energy Regulatory Commission.

== Career ==
Hossain served as deputy secretary in the Ministry of Defence, member of the Bangladesh Rural Electrification Board, joint secretary in the Ministry of Industries, managing director of the Bangladesh Film Development Corporation, director general of the Bangladesh Management Development Center, chairman of the Bangladesh Textile Mills Corporation, chairman of Bangladesh Energy Regulatory Commission, additional secretary in the Ministry of Industries, and secretary in both the Ministry of Cultural Affairs and the Ministry of Defence. He was an accused in the MiG-29 purchase scam case along with Prime Minister Sheikh Hasina. All of the accused were acquitted in 2011.

In addition to Hossain's government service, Hossain was actively involved in various socio-cultural and sports organizations, as well as multinational organizations. During his tenure as comptroller and auditor general (CAG) of Bangladesh, he initiated numerous reform initiatives aimed at modernizing and improving the activities of the Supreme Audit Institution (SAI) of Bangladesh. Hossain relinquished the position of CAG on February 4, 2002.

On 11 October 2009, Hossain was appointed chairman of the Bangladesh Energy Regulatory Commission. His appointment was challenged by a petitioner represented by Shahdeen Malik on the grounds that it would be unconstitutional since he had served as the comptroller and auditor general in the past. Justices Nozrul Islam Chowdhury and Naima Haider of the High Court Division declared his appointment illegal in February 2011.
