= Gholam Kibria =

Gholam Kibria (1932-2011) was the 4th Comptroller and Auditor General of Bangladesh and Finance Secretary of Bangladesh. He worked for the International Monetary Fund in Mongolia and Uzbekistan.

== Early life ==
Kibria was born on 1 January 1932. He did his undergraduate in science at the University of Dhaka in 1955.

== Career ==
In 1956, Kibria joined the Pakistan Audit and Accounts Service.

Kibria was the Deputy Secretary and then Additional Secretary at the Ministry of Finance. He was a counselor at the Embassy of Bangladesh to Russia in Moscow.

Kibria was appointed the secretary of the Ministry of Finance in 1980. He was an Alternate Executive Director of the World Bank. He returned from the World Bank in 1987 and was appointed secretary of the Ministry of Finance. He retired in 1988. On 30 March 1989, he was appointed the Comptroller and Auditor General of Bangladesh.

31 December 1991, Kibria retired as the Comptroller and Auditor General of Bangladesh. He was replaced by Khondkar Moazzamuddin Hossain. He jointed the International Monetary Fund and was stationed in Mongolia Budget Advise to the Mongolian Ministry of Finance. He then worked for the Ministry of Finance of the Government of Uzbekistan. In 1996, he wrote an article for the Government Audit Journal.

== Personal life ==
Kibria was married to Nadera Begum. They had three children.

== Death ==
Kibria died on 10 August 2011.
