= Office of Chief Administrative Officer =

- Formation: 1973
- Headquarters: Dhaka, Bangladesh
- Region served: Bangladesh
- Official language: Bengali
- Website: dcd.gov.bd

Office of Chief Administrative Officer (Bengali: প্রধান প্রশাসনিক কর্মকর্তার কার্যালয়) is a specialized department of the Government of Bangladesh under the Ministry of Defence responsible for the recruitment and management of civilian staff in Bangladesh Army, Bangladesh Navy, and Bangladesh Air Force. It is also accountable for inter-agency cooperation.

== History ==
Azizur Rahman was appointed the Director General of the Office of Chief Administrative Officer on 1 June 1973 and served in that position till 9 March 1983. He was replaced by Shahidur Rahman Shaheed.

In February 2018, Ferdous Uddin was appointed Director General of the Office of Chief Administrative Officer.

It started operations with 12 employees and by 2024 it had around two thousand employees.
