= Ministry of Defence Constabulary =

Security Agency under the Ministry of Defence of Bangladesh

- Formation: 1972
- Headquarters: Dhaka, Bangladesh
- Region served: Bangladesh
- Official language: Bengali
- Website: modc.portal.gov.bd

Ministry of Defence Constabulary (Bengali: মিনিস্ট্রি অব ডিফেন্স কনস্ট্যাবিউলারি) is a Bangladesh government security agency under the Ministry of Defense responsible for protecting military installations. Major Md. Moinul Islam is the commandant of the Ministry of Defence Constabulary.

== History ==
During the 3 November 1975 Bangladeshi coup d'état the Ministry of Defence Constabulary guarded the Dacca Airport, many of whom were veterans of Bangladesh Liberation War.

Ministry of Defence Constabulary Center & Record is located at Rajendrapur Cantonment.
