= Asif Ali (auditor general) =

Bangladeshi general

Asif Ali is the 9th comptroller and auditor general of Bangladesh.

== Career ==
Ali joined the Bangladesh Agricultural Development Corporation in 1982 as a member of the Martial Law Committee. In 1991, he was a member of the National Pay Scale Implementation Committee. He was the chairman of the Accounts Consolidation Task Force.

On 3 January 2003, Ali was sworn in as the comptroller and auditor general of Bangladesh by Chief Justice Mainur Reza Chowdhury. He replaced Ahsan Ali Sarkar as comptroller and auditor general of Bangladesh. In 2004, the minister of finance, M Saifur Rahman, criticized the Comptroller and Auditor General for reporting 'insignificant issues' which led to negative perceptions of Bangladesh and use of the reports by Transparency International.

In 2006, Ali was included in the Capacity Building Committee of the International Organisation of Supreme Audit Institutions. He called for information technology-based auditing practices in Bangladesh.

Ali was the comptroller and auditor general of Bangladesh till 1 January 2008. Ahmed Ataul Hakeem succeeded him as the comptroller and auditor general of Bangladesh. On 31 July 2008, Ali was included in the Truth and Accountability Commission. The Truth and Accountability Commission was established on 30 July 2008 by the Fakhruddin Ahmed led caretaker government to increase the speed of corruption cases. The caretaker government had arrested numerous politicians including former prime ministers Sheikh Hasina and Khaleda Zia on corruption charges. The commission was made up of a former judge of the Bangladesh Supreme Court Justice Habibur Rahman Khan, Ali, and retired major general Manzur Rashid Chowdhury from the Bangladesh Army. Prime Minister Sheikh Hasina disclosed the names of 456 people who had confessed to the commission in April 2009.
