= Central Cattle Breeding and Dairy Farm =

Bangladeshi breeding farm

- Formation: 1959
- Headquarters: Dhaka, Bangladesh
- Region served: Bangladesh
- Official language: Bengali
- Website: www.ccbs.gov.bd

Central Cattle Breeding and Dairy Farm (Bengali: কেন্দ্রীয় গো-প্রজনন ও দুগ্ধ খামার) is a Bangladesh government owned cattle breeding farm and research centre. It is located in Savar Upazila besides Jahangirnagar University. Mohammad Ali is the managing director of the farm.

== History ==
Central Cattle Breeding and Dairy Farm was established in 1959. It start operations in 1964 and was further developed in 1969 with assistance from the German government.

Central Cattle Breeding and Dairy Farm was producing 2000 tones of maize every year.

Embryo transfer protocol was established at the Central Cattle Breeding and Dairy Farm. The government of Bangladesh plans to increase meat and milk production through artificial insemination and breeding local cattle with European breeds. In 2017, Banglanews24.com reported that the farm had kept three secret auction slots for VIP during Eid-ul-Adha sales. The farm admitted underreporting three auction slots but denied it was saved for "VIPs".

On 28 November 2020, the National Economic Council approved plans to build a grass germplasm nursery in Central Cattle Breeding and Dairy Farm.
