= Bangladesh Institute of Nuclear Agriculture =

Research institute in Bangladesh

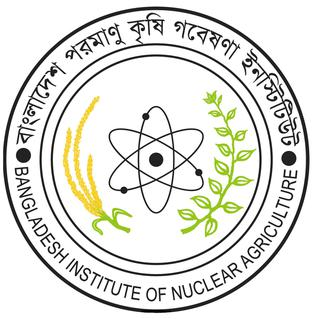
- Headquarters of Bangladesh Institute of Nuclear Agriculture (BINA), BAU Campus, Mymensingh-2022
- Established: 1961
- Staff: 404
- Key people: Dr. Md. Abul Kalam Azad (Director General)
- Formerly called: Atomic Energy Agricultural Research Centre
- Address: BAU Campus, Mymensingh-2202
- Location: Mymensingh, Mymensingh Division, Bangladesh
- Website: http://www.bina.gov.bd/

Bangladesh Institute of Nuclear Agriculture (BINA) is a research institute located in Mymensingh. It is under the Ministry of Agriculture. It specializes in using nuclear and radiation technology in agricultural research. Its headquarters located in Mymensingh, BINA has fourteen sub-stations at Noakhali, Comilla, Rangpur, Ishwardi, Magura, and Satkhira, etc.

== Achievements ==
BINA has developed more than 135 varieties of 22 crops where 93 varieties of different crops were developed using radiation technology. As well as variety BINA also developed more than 150 non-commodity technologies. For its contribution to the field of agricultural research, BINA has won many national and international awards, most notably the President's Gold Medal, National Agriculture Award, and IAEA award.

== Scientific divisions ==
BINA has 11 scientific divisions that conduct research programs.

- Plant Breeding Division,
- Biotechnology Division,
- Soil Science Division,
- Crop Physiology Division,
- Entomology Division,
- Plant Pathology Division,
- Agronomy Division,
- Agriculture Engineering Division,
- Adaptive Research and Extension Division,
- Agri-economics Division,
- Horticulture Division

== Awards ==
- President's Gold Medal (1979,1980)
- Independence Day Award (2019)
- National Agriculture Award (2014)
