= Survey of Bangladesh =

National mapping authority of Bangladesh

The Survey of Bangladesh (SOB) (Bengali: বাংলাদেশ জরিপ অধিদপ্তর) is the national mapping and surveying authority of Bangladesh. The agency functions under the Ministry of Defence and is headed by the Surveyor General of Bangladesh who is usually a Brigadier General rank officer from the Corps of Engineers of Bangladesh Army.

== History ==
SOB began as the "Bengal Survey" on 1 January 1767 in undivided India and conducted surveying and mapping activities until 1947. After the partition of the subcontinent on 14 August 1947, the organization started its new role as Survey of Pakistan and established a regional office at Dhaka. The regional office initially had 2 directorates, 2 field parties, 1 drawing office, 1 photogrammetric office (regional office for East Pakistan) and a geodetic department.

Topographic maps of Bengal were generated during the last quarter of the 18th century, covering the whole of Bangladesh at a scale of 1:50,000.

== Rights and responsibilities ==
The SOB possesses the rights to all aerial photographs and other topographic maps of Bangladesh. They undertake geodetic, topographical and aerial surveys from time to time and keep records of basic geodetic and levelling networks. Topomaps are prepared, updated and verified by ground surveys. The SOB's regular responsibilities include revising and upgrading the topographic basemaps drawn on 1:50,000 scale.

Aerial photographs in Bangladesh are used as per the 'Rules for Classification, Custody and Issue of Aerial Photographs' issued by the Ministry of Defence, Government of the People's Republic of Bangladesh. It is broadly divided into two categories: 'Classified Photographs' and 'Public Photographs'. The aerial photographs containing sensitive sites are marked as 'Classified' and those which do not contain any sensitive information are termed 'Public'.

The SOB is also responsible for the following:

- International boundary mapping (Chittagong - Mizo Hill Sector and Bangladesh-Myanmar Area)
- Monitoring mean sea level
- Surveys of the cantonments
- Project mapping; mapping service for various Ministries, departments and agencies; processing and preservation of aerial photographs
- Production of maps on various scales according to the needs of various departments

Map updating is a regular process and done once every five to seven years. At present the SOB is digitally updating the base map of Bangladesh. The SOB publishes all the maps from its own offset printing press and the products are available in its sales centre at the SOB campus located in the Tejgaon Industrial Area, Dhaka-1208.
