= Bangladesh Sugarcrop Research Institute =

Agricultural research institute in Bangladesh

Bangladesh Sugarcrop Research Institute (BSRI)
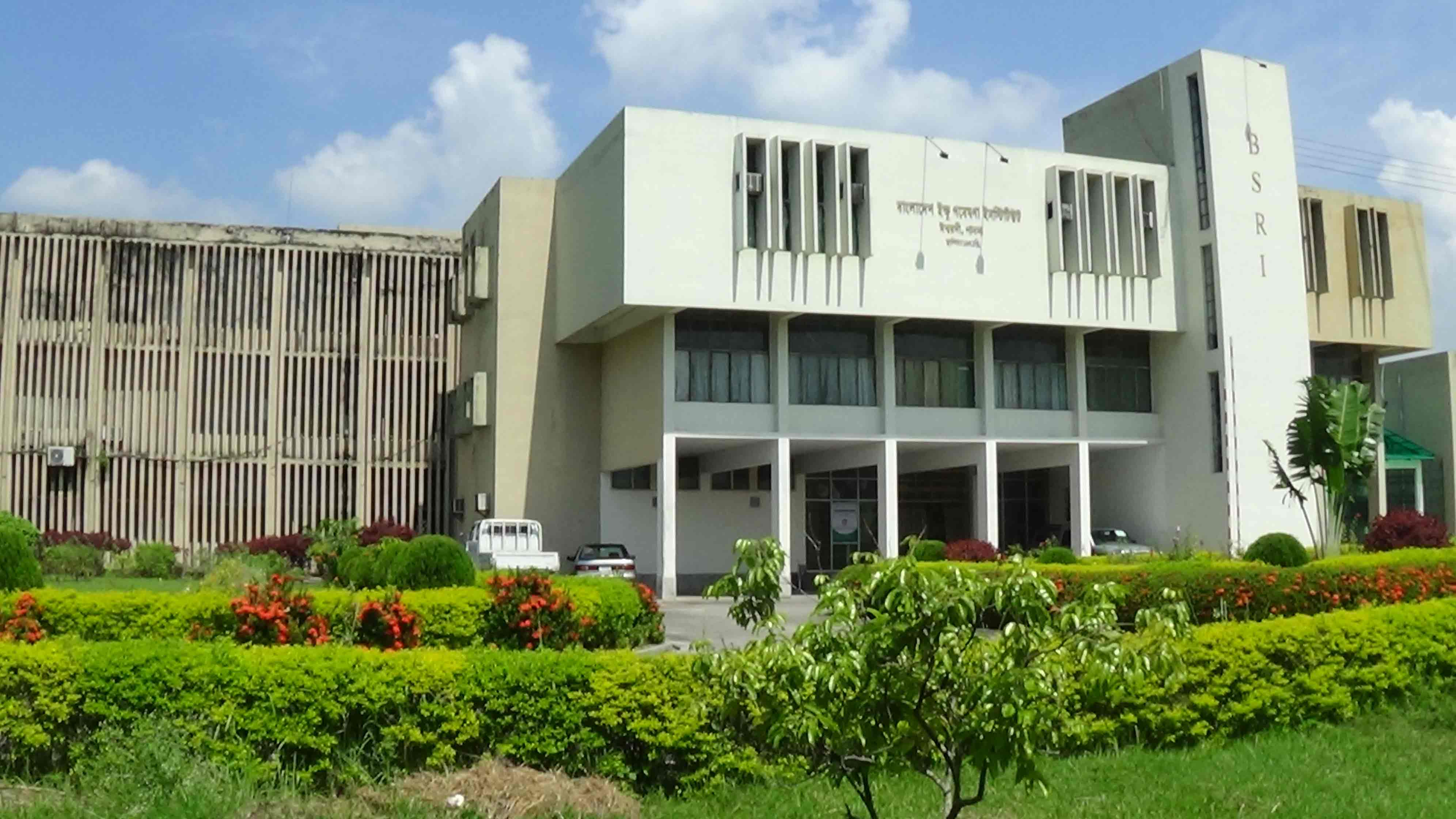
- Formation: 1931
- Headquarters: Ishwardi Upazila, Pabna, Bangladesh
- Region served: Bangladesh
- Official language: Bengali
- Website: www.bsri.gov.bd

Bangladesh Sugarcrop Research Institute or BSRI, is an autonomous national research institute that carries out research on sugarcane and other related plants. It is located in Ishwardi Upazila, Pabna, Bangladesh. It falls under the Ministry of Agriculture.

== History ==
In 1931 the Sugarcane Seedling Testing Station was established in Dhaka. It was changed to the Sugarcane Research Station on 1953 and placed under the Department of Agriculture. Bangladesh Sugar and Food Industries Corporation was placed in charge of the institute in 1973. In 1996 Bangladesh Sugarcane Research Institute was made an autonomous institute by an act of parliament. It supports the cultivation of date palms and sugarcanes.

== Gallery ==
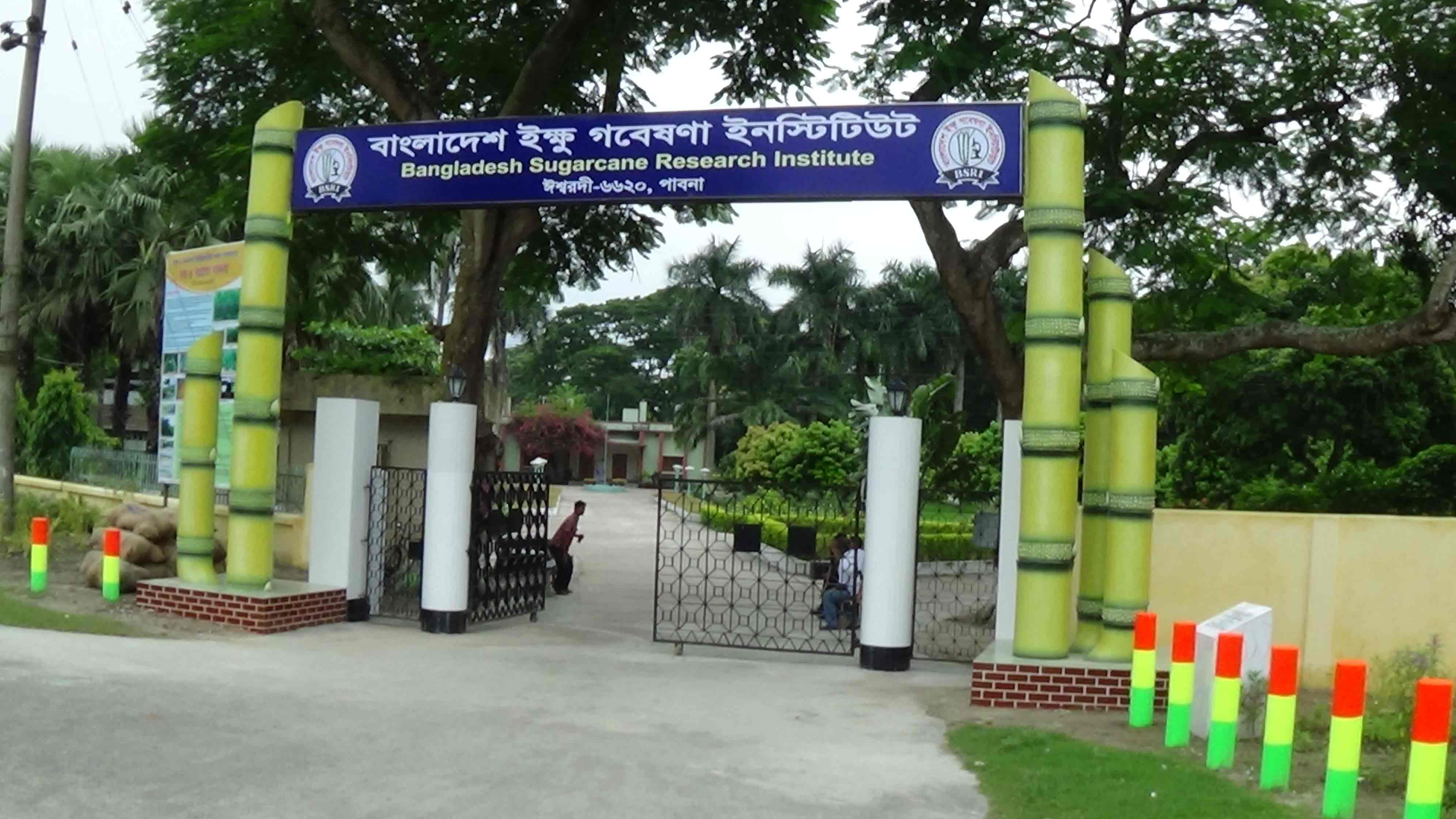
Main Gate of Bangladesh Sugarcane Research Institute 01

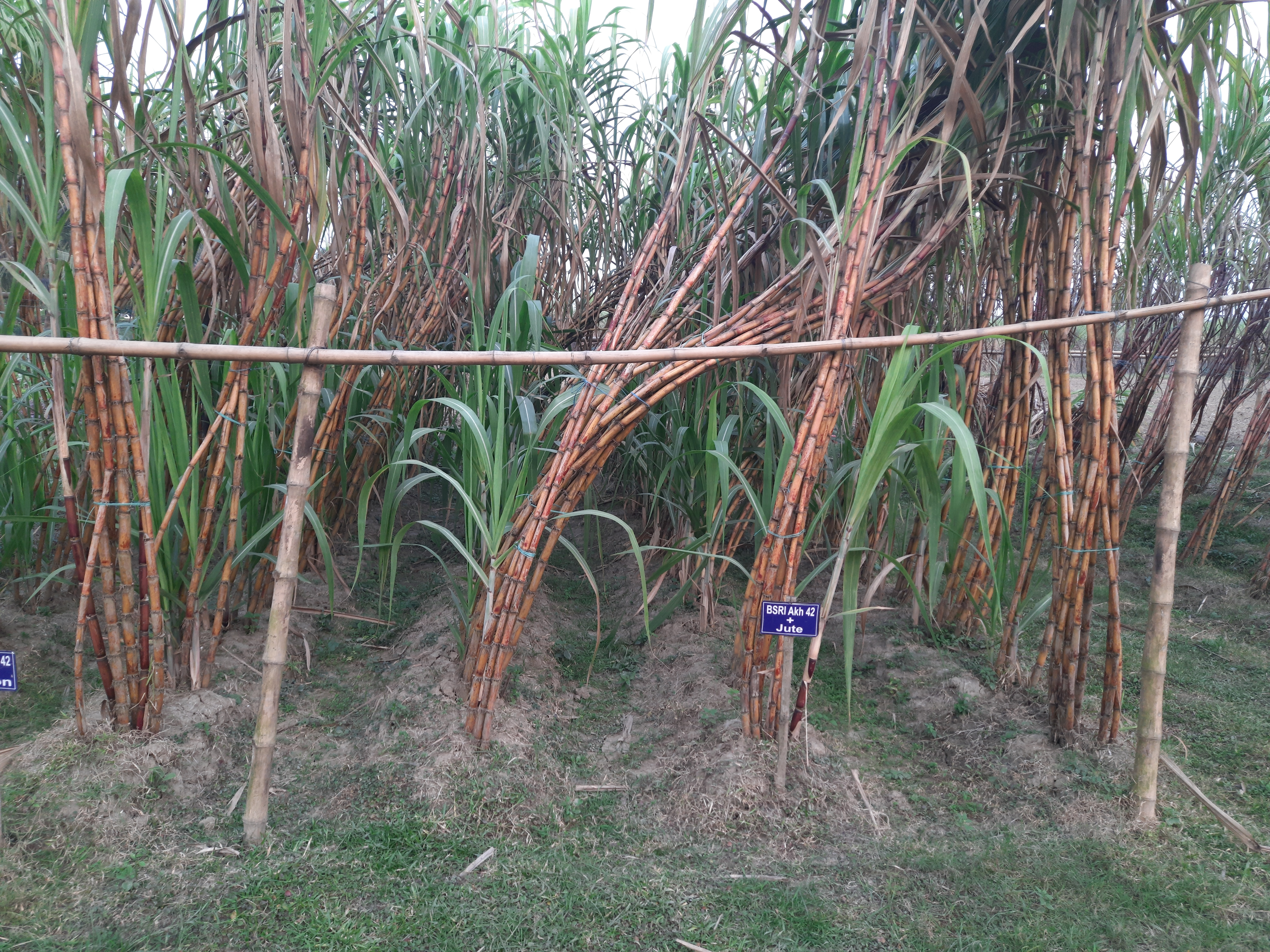
Sugarcane fields in Bangladesh Sugarcane Research Institute

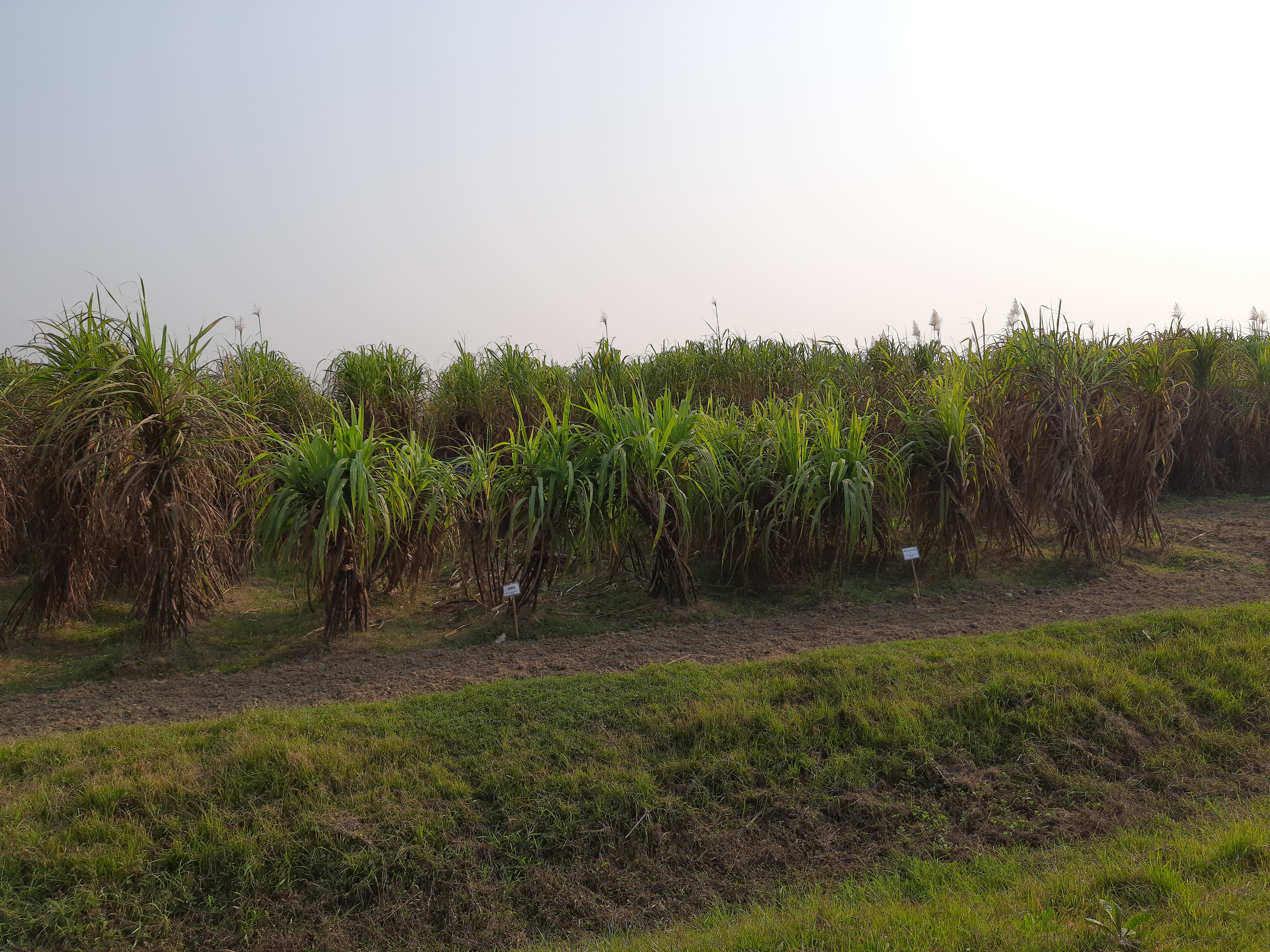
Sugarcane for research in Bangladesh Sugarcane Research Institute
