= Bangladesh Space Research and Remote Sensing Organization =

Agency overview
- Abbreviation: SPARRSO
- Formed: 1968; 58 years ago (as an APT ground station); 1980; 46 years ago (current form)
- Type: Space agency
- Jurisdiction: Ministry of Defence
- Headquarters: Agargaon, Sher-e-Bangla Nogor, Dhaka, Bangladesh
- Owner: Government of Bangladesh
- Website: www.sparrso.gov.bd

Bangladesh Space Research and Remote Sensing Organization (SPARRSO; Bengali: বাংলাদেশ মহাকাশ গবেষণা ও দূর অনুধাবন প্রতিষ্ঠান, romanized: Bāṅlādēś môhākāś gôbēṣôṇā ō dūr ōnudhābôn prôtiṣṭhān) is the government space agency of Bangladesh, concerned with astronomical and atmospheric research and the application of space technology in the country.

== History ==
SPARRSO was founded in 1968 as the American space program's Automatic Picture Transmission ground station. The organization aims to contribute to national development by promoting the peaceful application of space science and technology. In 1972, when NASA launched its Earth Resources Technology Satellite, SPARRSO actively collaborated with NASA and subsequently joined efforts with Japanese and European space programs.

After gaining independence, the government initiated the Bangladesh ERTS Programme to survey natural resources and monitor and manage the environment and disasters. Due to the success of this initiative, the Bangladesh Landsat Programme was incorporated into the five-year plan in 1975. Subsequently, in 1980, the Space and Atmospheric Research Centre of the Bangladesh Atomic Energy Commission merged with the Bangladesh Landsat Programme to form the Bangladesh Space Research and Remote Sensing Organization. The Parliament restructured SPARRSO through the enactment of Act 29 in 1991.

== Research ==
SPARRSO works closely with JAXA, NASA and the ESA in environmental and meteorological research. Using Japanese and American satellites, SPARRSO monitors agro-climatic conditions and water resources in Bangladesh.

It has two satellite ground stations at Gazipur and Rangamati. These ground facilities include a Satellite Control and Network Operations Center, utilizing the SpaceGate global solution from Thales Alenia Space.

In 2018, their first satellite Bangladesh Satellite-1 was released.

== Activities and program ==
=== General activities ===
SPARRSO's activities include operational efforts for national interest, research and technological development, support for national development, milestones in nation-building, and human resource development in Remote sensing and Geographic information system technology.

SPARRSO utilizes space and remote sensing technology across various fields such as Agriculture, Forestry, Fisheries, Geology, and Water Resources. It conducts research to advance these technologies, providing essential information and research results to the government and relevant agencies. SPARRSO also informs the government about international advancements in space technology and advises on national policy formulation. Additionally, it conducts training, technical research, and collaborates with national and international organizations while implementing development projects with governmental approval.

=== Proposed space programme ===
In June 2026, SPARRSO, for the first time, unveiled it's plan to launch a space programme by 2027 with government approval. Under the proposed plan, SPARRSO will develop a spacecraft manufacturing hub in Chandpur or Shariatpur Districts, a launching pad in Patuakhali's Kuakata, and a space industrial park near Khan Jahan Ali Airport, Khulna. SPARRSO set its goal to launch a homemade artificial satellite by 2041. SPARRSO officials described it as a long-term "investment of sovereignty" regarding financial and national benefit, which is expected to become positive comprehensively. Related key issues include environmental concerns and lack of a "Space Act". On 19 November 2026, in a ceremony at Aviation and Aerospace University, Prime Minister Tarique Rahman declared to launch homemade satellite within next three years.

== Divisions ==
Currently, SPARRSO has a total of 17 working divisions. These include the Atmospheric Division, Agriculture Division, Agro-hydrometeorology Division, Forestry Division, Water Resources Division, Oceanography Division, Fisheries Division, Cartography Division, Ground Station Division, Photographic Division, Ocean Physics Division, Instrumentation and Data Processing Division, Ground Truth Division, Geology Division, Rocket Technology Development Division, Space Physics and Rocket Dynamics Division, and the Regional Remote Sensing Center.

== See also ==
- Bangladesh Satellite-1
- List of government space agencies
