= Bangladesh Wheat and Maize Research Institute =

Bangladeshi agricultural research institute

- Formation: 2017
- Headquarters: Dinajpur, Bangladesh
- Region served: Bangladesh
- Official language: Bengali
- Website: www.bwmri.gov.bd

The Bangladesh Wheat and Maize Research Institute (Bengali: বাংলাদেশ গম ও ভুট্টা গবেষণা ইনস্টিটিউট) is a Bangladesh government owned research institute that researches wheat and maize. It is located in Nashipur, Dinajpur District, Bangladesh. Golam Faruq is its director general. It had received the Independence Day Award, the highest civilian award in Bangladesh, for research in 2022.

== History ==
The Wheat Research Centre was established in 1984 under the Bangladesh Agricultural Research Institute. Prime Minister Sheikh Hasina announced plans to transform it into an independent research institute. In 2006, research on maize was added to the institute. In 2017, the parliament of Bangladesh passed the Bangladesh Wheat and Maize Research Institute Bill, which established the Bangladesh Wheat and Maize Research Institute to research wheat and maize. The institute has seven regional stations.

In 2020, scientists at the institute developed two varieties of wheat that had resistance to Magnaporthe grisea.

D. MD Mahfuz Bazzaz was appointed the director general of the Bangladesh Wheat and Maize Research Institute. The former chief scientific officer of the institute, Anwar Shaheed, was murdered in Dhaka on 12 November 2021.

In 2022, the Bangladesh Wheat and Maize Research Institute was awarded the Independence Day Award for research.
