= Neem Chandra Bhowmik =

Bangladeshi physicist and diplomat (died 2026)

- নিমচন্দ্র ভৌমিক

Ambassador of Bangladesh to Nepal
- In office 23 November 2009 – 5 September 2012
- Preceded by: Imtiaz Ahmed
- Succeeded by: Mashfee Binte Shams

Personal details
- Died: 4 October 2026 Dhaka, Bangladesh

Neem Chandra Bhowmik (Bengali: নিমচন্দ্র ভৌমিক; died 4 October 2026) was a Bangladeshi physicist and diplomat who was a professor in the Department of Applied Physics at the University of Dhaka and a leader of the Hindu minority community in Bangladesh. He was the Ambassador of Bangladesh to Nepal with a controversial term. He was the president of Bangladesh Hindu Buddhist Christian Unity Council.

== Life and career ==
In 2007, while Bhowmik was the Chairperson of the Department of Applied Physics at Dhaka University, he was arrested during student protests under the military-backed caretaker government. In March 2008, the court declared him innocent.

On 22 July 2009, the Bangladesh appointed Bhowmik Ambassador of Bangladesh to Nepal. In July 2010, Bhowmik was awarded the Mother Teresa Gold Medal.

In July 2011, Nepal requested the withdrawal of Bhowmik from his post in Nepal. A Bangladeshi Foreign Ministry report accused Bhowmik of professional misconduct, violating diplomatic norms, and involvement in Nepalese politics. He was also accused of accepting kickbacks from Nepali students for scholarships, stalking actress Manisha Koirala, and harassing Indian Embassy spokeswoman Mrs. Apoorva Srivastava. Additionally, he used an embassy car inappropriately and made controversial remarks at a Mujibnagar anniversary event. Complaints about his behavior towards women were also raised. The government decided not to extend his ambassadorship. A committee was formed to review the allegations, and if no serious findings were reported, he would be granted a respectful exit.

== Leadership roles ==
Bhowmik was the general secretary of Bangladesh Hindu Buddhist Christian Unity Council multiple times. He was also the president of Bangladesh Muktijodha Foundation and Bangladesh Puja Udjapan Parishad.

== Death ==
Bhowmik died at a hospital in Dhaka on 4 October 2026.
