= Bangladesh Armed Services Board =

Bangladesh authority body

- Seal

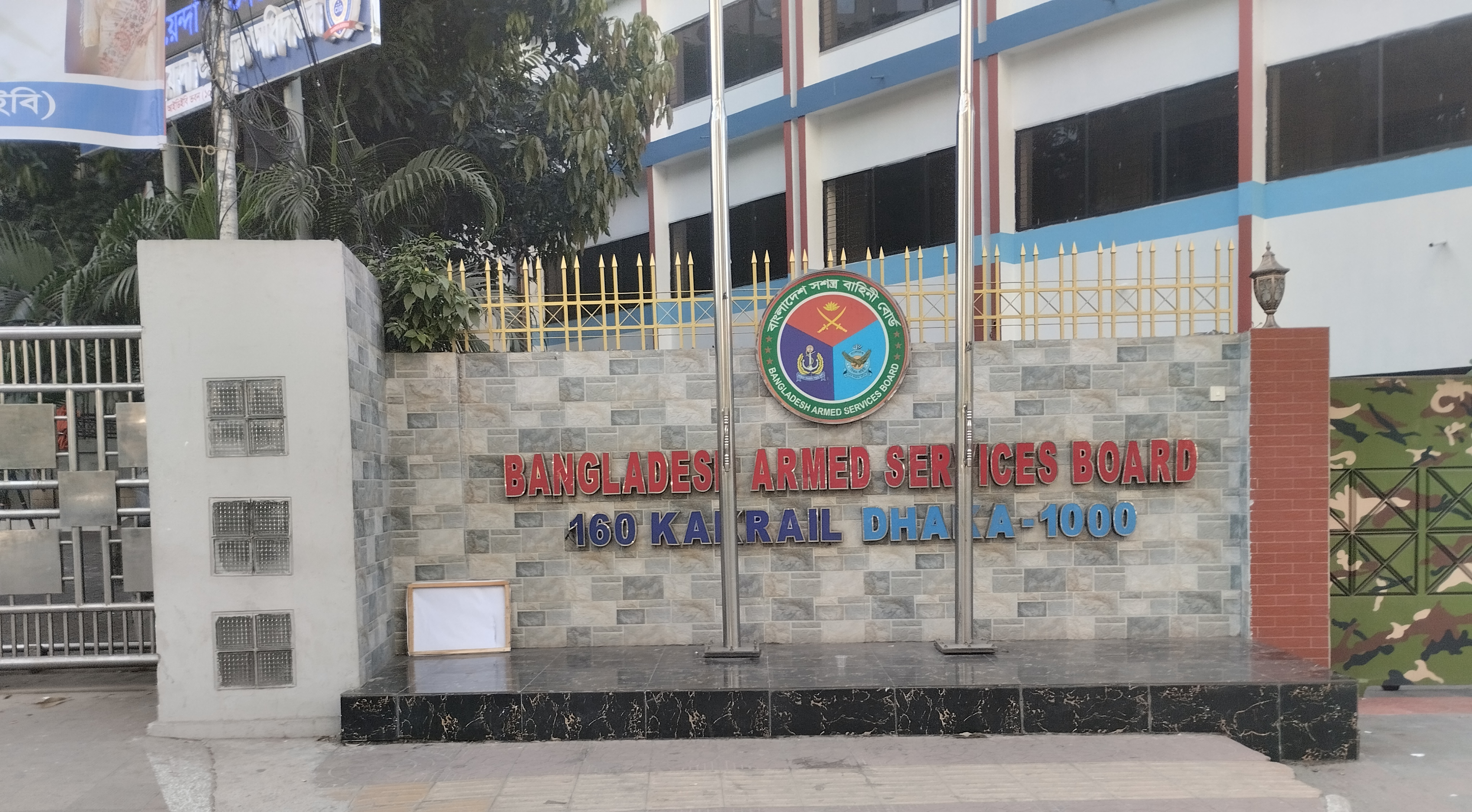
- Formation: 1972
- Headquarters: Kakrail, Dhaka, Bangladesh
- Region served: Bangladesh
- Official language: Bengali
- Website: basb.gov.bd

The Bangladesh Armed Services Board (Bengali: বাংলাদেশ সশস্ত্র বাহিনী বোর্ড) is a Bangladesh government body under the Ministry of Defence responsible for the welfare of serving and retired military personnel. The director general of the board is Md. Saiful Alam Bhuiyan of the Bangladesh Army. The director of the Bangladesh Armed Services Board also sits on the Board of Directors of Sena Kalyan Sangstha.

== History ==
The British Raj established the Soldiers, Sailors and Airmens Board to look after the welfare of retired and serving personnel in India. After the Partition of India it was renamed to Pakistan Armed Services Board which was renamed to Bangladesh Armed Services Board after the independence of Bangladesh in 1971. Under the Bangladesh Armed Services Board are 20 District Armed Services Boards based in different regions of Bangladesh.

The boards channels funds from Royal Commonwealth Ex-Services League to former soldiers who served in the British colonial army and their widows. 11 former personnel and 149 widows of former personnel are receiving funds from the British government through the league.

== See also ==
- Pakistan Armed Services Board
