= Mohammad Muslim Chowdhury =

Former Chairman of Sonali Bank

Mohammad Muslim Chowdhury is the former finance secretary and who served as the 12th Comptroller and Auditor General of Bangladesh and former chairman of Sonali Bank

== Early life ==
Chowdhury was born in Chittagong.

Chowdhury completed his B.A. in commerce and M.A. in accounting from the University of Chittagong. He graduated from the University of Birmingham with a master's in finance and accounting.

== Career ==
Chowdhury joined Bangladesh Civil Service as a Audit and Accounts Cadre in 1984.

Chowdhury served in a number of capacities in the Ministry of Finance. He held the position of Controller General Defense Finance and the Controller General of Accounts. He has held the position of Deputy Secretary, Joint Secretary, and Additional Secretary. He was a Director of the SAARC Development Fund.

Chowdhury served a director of a number of state owned companies such as Biman Bangladesh Airlines, Bangladesh Krishi Bank, Dhaka Bus Rapid Transit Company Limited, Eastern Refinery, Sonali Bank, and Titas Gas. He was the founding CEO of the Bangladesh Infrastructure Finance Fund Limited.

In 2012, Chowdhury was a Director of Deepening Medium Term Budget Framework, a project to develop and reform financial management services. He was a member of the transaction execution committee of the government tasked with offloading sovereign bonds.

Chowdhury was appointed the finance secretary of the Ministry of Finance on 4 October 2017.

On 17 July 2018, Chowdhury was appointed the 12th Comptroller and Auditor General of Bangladesh. Abdur Rouf Talukder replaced him as the new Finance Secretary. He had looked at developing a joint platform between the office of the comptroller and auditor general and the Anti-Corruption Commission.

On 28 August 2024, Chowdhury was appointed the chairman of Sonali bank before resigning on 2 March 2026.
