= Controller General of Defence Finance =

Department of the Bangladesh government

- Seal
- Formation: 1971
- Headquarters: Dhaka, Bangladesh
- Region served: Bangladesh
- Official language: Bengali
- Website: Controller General of Defence Finance

Controller General of Defence Finance is a department of the Prime Minister's Office that is responsible for the finances and salaries of Bangladesh Armed Forces and is located in Dhaka, Bangladesh.

== History ==
The organization followed the Controller General Defence Finance Procedure Manual of 1955 till 2007 when it was updated. It functions as a wing of Office of the Comptroller and Auditor General. The department is headed by a civil servant.
