= SAARC Development Fund =

South Asian financial institution

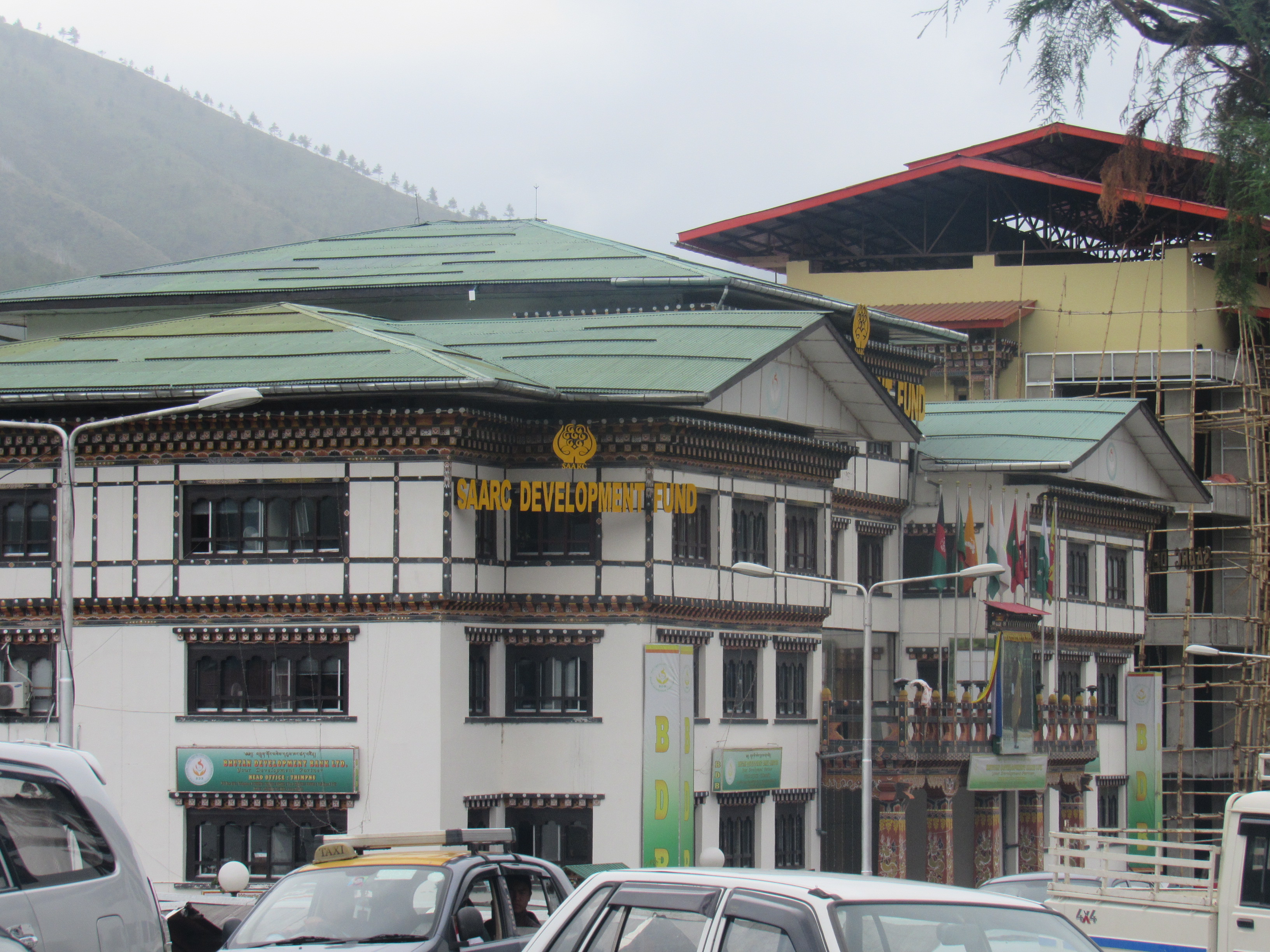
- SAARC Development Fund office in Thimphu city, July 2016
- Abbreviation: SDF
- Formation: 28 April 2010; 16 years ago
- Type: Multilateral Development Institution
- Legal status: Treaty
- Purpose: Social and Economic Development
- Headquarters: Thimphu, Bhutan
- Region served: South Asia
- Members: 8 countries
- Chief Drawing Officer: Sunil Motiwal
- Main organ: South Asian Association for Regional Cooperation
- Website: www.sdfsec.org

SAARC Development Fund (SDF) (also known as SAARC Development Fund Secretariat For Regional Integration) is a regional financial institution based in Thimphu, Bhutan.

== History ==
SDF was founded in 2010 by the member countries of the South Asian Association for Regional Cooperation (SAARC), an intergovernmental organization comprising eight countries in South Asia, namely Afghanistan, Bangladesh, Bhutan, India, Maldives, Nepal, Pakistan, and Sri Lanka. It carries out and manages various projects and programs across three key areas: Social, Economic, and Infrastructure.

The SDF has its roots in two distinct regional funds known as the SAARC Fund for Regional Projects (SFRP) and the SAARC Regional Fund (SRF). These funds were proposed during the 5th SAARC Summit in Malé in November 1990, with the objective of identifying and executing regional projects that emerged from the SAARC process. These funds eventually became a part of the South Asian Development Fund (SADF), which Bhutan started during the sixth Summit in 1992.

SADF commenced operations on June 16–17, 1996, with an initial resource pool of approximately US$6.4 million. This amount included a contribution of US$5 million, which was earlier designated for the SFRP, contributed on a pro-rata basis by the member states. specifically. Nevertheless, after determining that the existing mechanism was not satisfactory, the First Meeting of Financial Experts was held in September 2005 during the Thirteenth SAARC Summit in Dhaka. Following the recommendations put forth by the Financial Experts, it was agreed to reformulate the South Asian Development Fund (SADF) into the SAARC Development Fund (SDF).

Afterward, the Framework for the SAARC Development Fund (SDF) was endorsed during the First Meeting of the SAARC Finance Ministers on July 11, 2006, held in Islamabad. They also agreed upon a roadmap for establishing the SDF. Subsequently, the SAARC leaders signed the Charter of the SAARC Development Fund on August 3, 2008, during the Fifteenth SAARC Summit held in Colombo from August 2–3, 2008. In line with this development, a permanent Secretariat for the SDF was inaugurated in Thimphu on April 28, 2010, coinciding with the Sixteenth SAARC Summit.

As of 2018, the SDF has an authorized capital of $1.5 billion and a total capital base of $500 million. The SDF is currently focused on expanding its credit portfolio to $300 million within the coming years.
