= Habibur Rahman Khan =

Bangladeshi Judge

Justice of the High Court Division of Bangladesh

Personal details
- Born: 5 January 1930
- Died: 20 October 2015 (aged 85) Dhaka, Bangladesh
- Profession: Judge

Habibur Rahman Khan (5 January 1930 – 20 October 2015) was a judge of the High Court Division of Bangladesh Supreme Court and the only chairman of the Truth and Accountability Commission.

== Early life ==
Khan was born on 5 January 1930 in Manikganj District, East Bengal, British India.

== Career ==
Khan led a judicial commission in 1998 that looked at the Shamim Reza Rubel murder in police custody.

Khan was chairman of Bangladesh Press Council in 2006 and founder of Manikganj Zilla Samity. He was a former president of the Dhaka Bar Association.

In August 2007, clashes broke out between students of the University of Dhaka and Bangladesh Army soldiers stationed on campus and car of Directorate General of Forces Intelligence was burned. In the following days protests spread to different districts in which one person was killed and 300 were injured. Khan led a one man commission formed by the government to investigate the incident. His investigation found no fault with the actions of the university teachers. Bangladesh Police had detained Dr. Sadrul Amin, President of Dhaka University Teachers' Association and General Secretary of Dhaka University Teachers' Association M. Anwar Hossain. The police also detained Professor Harun-or-Rashid and Professor Dr. Neem Chandra Bhowmik of the University of Dhaka along with 15 students. His final report recommended that the government create a code of conduct for University of Dhaka students, teachers, and staff.

On 30 July 2008, Khan was made the first chairman of the Truth and Accountability Commission. The commission formed by the Fakhruddin Ahmed led Caretaker Government to investigate corruption. The Commission would be declared illegal by the High Court Division.

In 2010, Khan was made the leader of a single man commission to investigate government land which have been illegally occupied. He reported the task to be impossible due to the size of the task and the lack of manpower.

== Death ==
Khan died on 20 October 2015 in United Hospital Limited, Dhaka, Bangladesh.
