= Department of Agricultural Extension =

Government Department in Bangladesh

- Formation: 1982
- Headquarters: Dhaka, Bangladesh
- Region served: Bangladesh
- Parent organization: Ministry of Agriculture
- Website: www.dae.gov.bd

Department of Agricultural Extension (Bengali: কৃষি সম্প্রসারণ অধিদপ্তর) is a government department responsible for agricultural extension in Bangladesh. It is located in Dhaka.

== History ==
The Agriculture Directorate (Extension and Management) and Jute directorate were established in 1975 by the then government of Bangladesh. The Department of Agricultural Extension was formed in 1982 through the merger of Agriculture Directorate (Extension and Management), Jute Directorate, Plant Protection Directorate, Horticulture Board, Tobacco Development Board, and Central Extension Resource and Development Institute (CERDI). The department carried out Training and Visit programs to train farmers till 1990 and then adapted group training. The government of Bangladesh adapted the New Agriculture Extension Policy (NAEP) in 1996 to plan the activities of the department. It is under the Ministry of Agriculture.
