= Soil Resource Development Institute =

Government Agency of Bangladesh

Soil Resources Development Institute
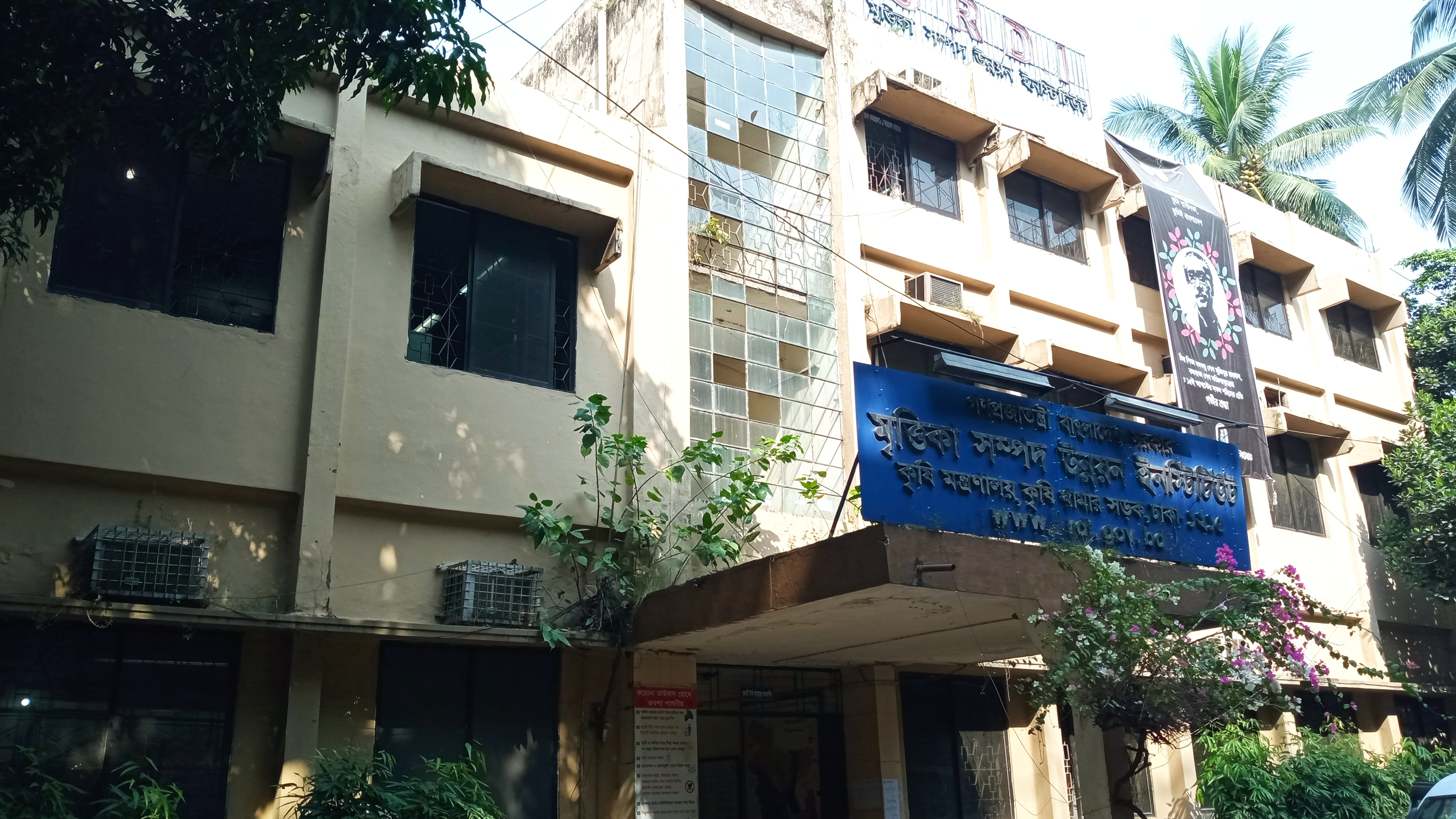
- SRDI Head Office
- Abbreviation: SRDI
- Formation: 1982
- Headquarters: Mrittika Bhaban, Krishi Khamar Sarak, Dhaka-1215, Bangladesh
- Region served: Bangladesh
- Official language: Bengali
- Website: www.srdi.gov.bd

Soil Resources Development Institute (SRDI) is a government organization under the Ministry of Agriculture working as a statutory organization that carries out research on soil and surveys on soil quality to improve agriculture in Bangladesh and is located in Dhaka, Bangladesh.

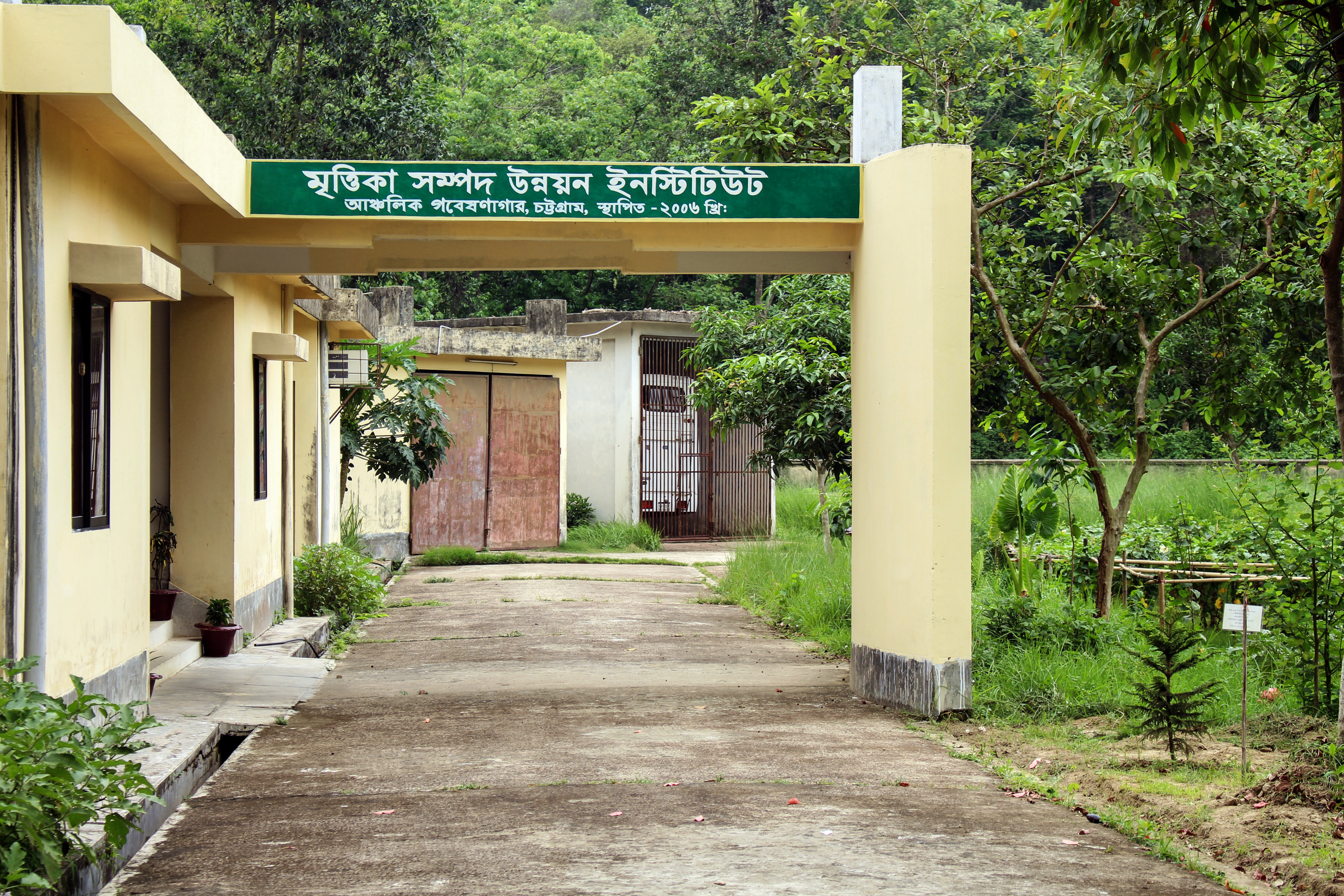
Regional Laboratory, Chittagong

== History ==
It started out as the East Pakistan branch of Directorate of the Soil Survey Project of Pakistan. In 1982 it was updated and the Soil Resources Development Institute was established.
