= Bangladesh Agricultural Research Institute =

Research institute in Bangladesh

Coordinates: 24.369122°N 88.661750°E

- Type: Organization
- Established: 1976
- Location: Joydebpur, Gazipur, Dhaka, Bangladesh
- Website: www.bari.gov.bd

Bangladesh Agricultural Research Institute (BARI) (Bengali: বাংলাদেশ কৃষি গবেষণা ইনস্টিটিউট) is an autonomous organization under the Ministry of Agriculture, that conducts research on all crops except rice, jute, sugarcane, and tea for which there are separate institutes. The central research station of the institute is at Joydebpur about 35 kilometres (22 mi) north of Dhaka.

== History ==
Bangladesh Agricultural Research Institute traces its origins to Dhaka farm which was established in 1908. Bangladesh Agricultural Research Institute was established in 1976 as an autonomous research institute. The research compound of the central station is spread over 176 hectares of land of which 126 hectares are experiment fields. The institute has established six regional research stations in six regions of Bangladesh to develop new technologies. These research stations are located at Ishwardi, Jamalpur, Jessore, Hathazari, Rahmatpur, and Akbarpur. It also has 28 research stations including three hill research stations (Khagrachari, Ramgarh and Raikhali). Besides these, BARI has seven crop research centers, four of which are at the central research station in Joydebpur.

== Constituent agricultural colleges ==
- Bangladesh Agricultural Institute
- Patuakhali Science and Technology University
- Hajee Mohammad Danesh Science & Technology University

== Crops research centre ==
- Tuber Crops Research Centre
- Wheat Research Centre
- Horticultural Research Centre
- Pulse Research Centre
- Oil Crops Research Centre
- Spice Research Centre

== See also ==
- Bangabandhu Sheikh Mujibur Rahman Agricultural University
- Bangladesh Rice Research Institute
- Bangladesh Agricultural University
- List of agricultural universities and colleges
- BARI High School
- Mango Research Station
- Central Cattle Breeding and Dairy Farm
