= Bangladesh Agricultural Development Corporation =

Government body in Bangladesh

- Formation: 1961
- Headquarters: Dhaka, Bangladesh
- Region served: Bangladesh
- Official language: Bengali
- Chairman: Md. Azizul Islam
- Website: Bangladesh Agricultural Development Corporation

Bangladesh Agricultural Development Corporation or BADC, is an autonomous government body that manages the agricultural Inputs Supplier i.e. agricultural seeds, non-nitrogen fertilizer and Minor Irrigation facilitating to farmers of Bangladesh and is located in Motijheel Thana, Dhaka, Bangladesh.

== About ==
Bangladesh Agricultural Development Corporation (BADC) the successor of the East Pakistan Agricultural Development Corporation, established under the Agricultural Development Corporation Ordinance, 1961 (E.P. Ordinance XXXVII of 1961). In 1975, BADC was renamed as the Bangladesh Agricultural Inputs Supply and Services Corporation (BAISSC) to distinguish the functions of the corporation from other development agencies of the Government in the agricultural sector. But again in 1976 BAISSC was renamed as BADC. Based in Dhaka city, BADC, an autonomous corporate body under the Ministry of Agriculture, serves to the whole of Bangladesh and has a nationwide network of outlying field offices down to the upazila level and at some places even below that level.

The general direction and administration of the corporation and all of its affairs are vested in a Board of Directors headed by the chairman. The operational set-up of the Corporation comprises five wings. These are: Seed & Horticulture, Minor Irrigation, Fertilizer Management, Finance and Administration.

The mandatory or primary functions of BADC are: to make suitable arrangements throughout Bangladesh for the production, procurement, transport, storage and distribution of essential agricultural inputs such as seed and fertilizers and providing irrigation facilities through utilization of surface and underground water to the farmers.

Professionals from different disciplines such as agriculture, engineering, economics, management, computer science etc. work together in BADC. The total number of sanctioned posts was 25,451. But during the early 90s due to withdrawal of fertilizer management activities from BADC and privatization of irrigation activities and also due to normal and voluntary retirement and other reasons the number of working people and capacity of the organization was reduced.

In 1999 through a gazette notification (published in Bangladesh Gazette on November 22, 1999) the corporation was reorganized and entrusted with some new activities on seed production and irrigation. In 2009 the corporation is made more vibrant and is given some more responsibilities such as providing irrigation facilities to the farmer through surface water utilization, import of non-urea fertilizer through G2G arrangement and strengthening of seed production activities with the task of multiplication of high yielding and different stress tolerant varieties of seeds allocating financial support through new projects and programmes.
