= Comptroller and Auditor General (Bangladesh) =

Bangladeshi supreme audit institution

Comptroller and Auditor General of Bangladesh
- বাংলাদেশের মহা হিসাব নিরীক্ষক ও নিয়ন্ত্রক (Bengali)

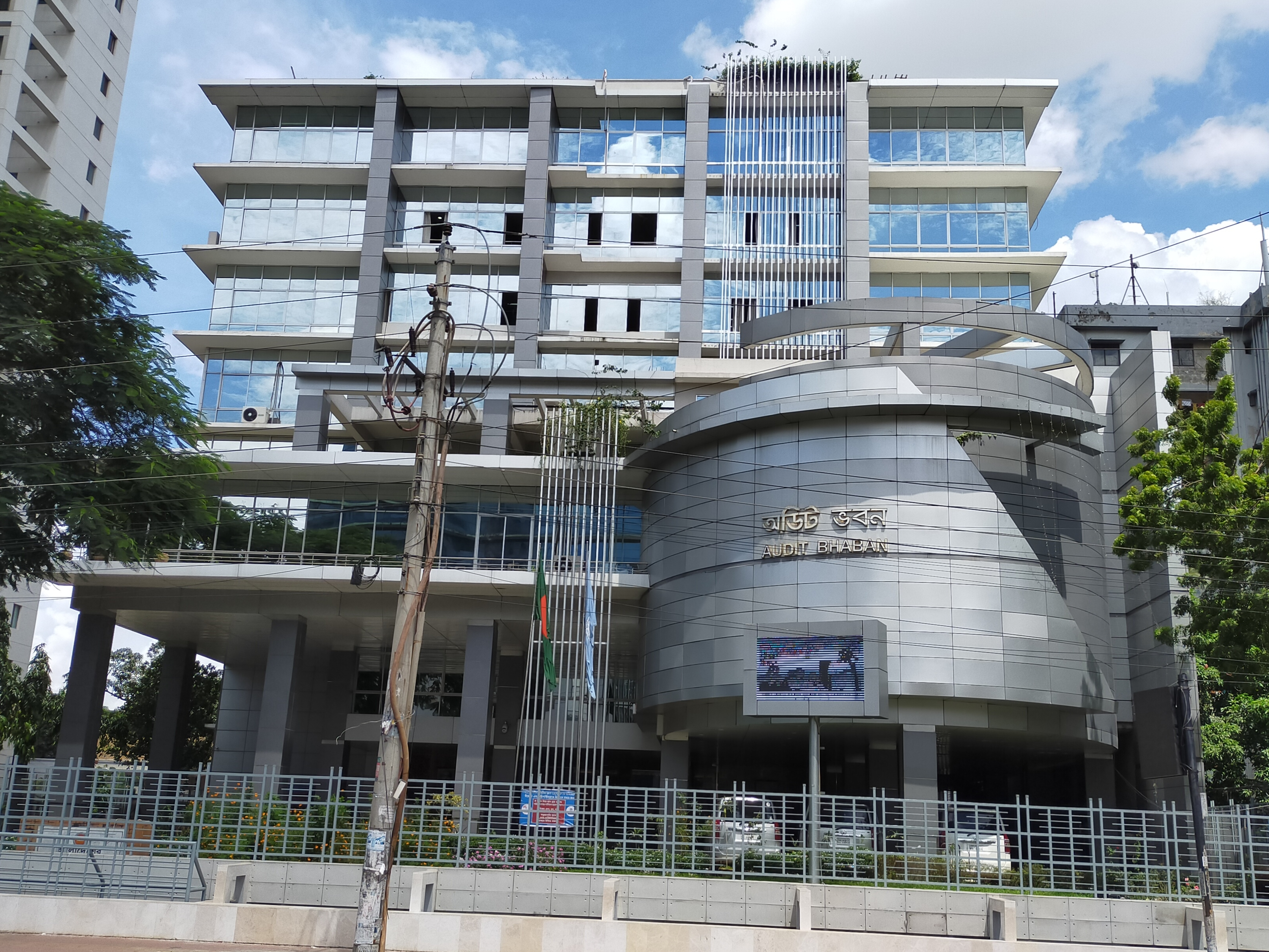
- Incumbent; Md. Nurul Islam since 26 July 2023
- Nominator: Prime Minister of Bangladesh
- Appointer: President of Bangladesh
- Term length: 5 Years or up to 65 Years of age (whichever is earlier)
- Website: www.cag.org.bd

The Comptroller and Auditor General of Bangladesh (CAG) is a constitutional organization and the supreme audit institution of the country. This institute is responsible for maintaining accounts of the republic and auditing all receipts and expenditure of the Government of Bangladesh, including those of bodies and authorities substantially financed by the government. The reports of the CAG are discussed by the Public Accounts Committee, which is a standing committee in the Parliament of Bangladesh.

In more recent times, in addition to carrying out the traditional approach of conducting financial audits and compliance audits, the Office of the Comptroller and Auditor General of Bangladesh (OCAG) has introduced performance audits, which focus on evaluating economy, efficiency and effectiveness in the management of public resources of different government entities.

== List of comptrollers and auditors general ==
On 11 May 1973, the first comptroller and auditor-general was appointed by the government of Bangladesh. Since then there were 12 people who led office of the comptroller and auditor general of Bangladesh. A list is given below including the running CAG-

Order	Comptroller and Auditor General	Term start	Term end
1	Late Fazle Kader Muhammad Abdul Baqui	11 May 1973	31 December 1975
2	Osman Ghani Khan	1 March 1976	31 December 1982
3	A K Azizul Huq	1 January 1983	29 March 1989
4	Gholam Kibria	30 March 1989	31 December 1991
5	Khondkar Moazzamuddin Hossain	7 March 1992	29 March 1996
6	M. Hafizuddin Khan	3 April 1996	7 August 1999
7	Syed Yusuf Hossain	8 August 1999	4 February 2002
8	Muhammad Ahsan Ali Sarkar	5 March 2002	31 December 2002
9	Asif Ali	2 January 2003	1 January 2008
10	Ahmed Ataul Hakeem	12 February 2008	11 February 2013
11	Masud Ahmed	28 April 2013	26 April 2018
12	Mohammad Muslim Chowdhury	17 July 2018	16 July 2023
13	Md. Nurul Islam	26 July 2023	Incumbent

== Functional areas ==
At present, there are 17 (seventeen) different Audit Directorates, carrying out audits on behalf of the CAG in the government offices and the public sector entities. Each of the Directorates is headed by a Director General. A list of audit directorates are given below:

1. Directorate of Civil Audit
2. Directorate of Revenue Audit
3. Directorate of Commercial Audit
4. Directorate of Works Audit
5. Directorate of Transport Audit
6. Directorate of Foreign Aided Project Audit
7. Directorate of Postal, Telecommunication, Science & Technology Audit
8. Directorate of Defense Audit
9. Directorate of Health Audit
10. Directorate of Education Audit
11. Directorate of Agriculture & Environment Audit
12. Directorate of Local Government & Rural Development Audit
13. Directorate of Social Safety Net Audit
14. Directorate of Power & Energy Audit
15. Directorate of IT & Public Services Audit
16. Directorate of Constitutional Bodies Audit
17. Directorate of Mission Audit
