= Women's Affairs Reform Commission =

Government of Bangladesh Commission

- নারীবিষয়ক সংস্কার কমিশন
- Government Seal of Bangladesh

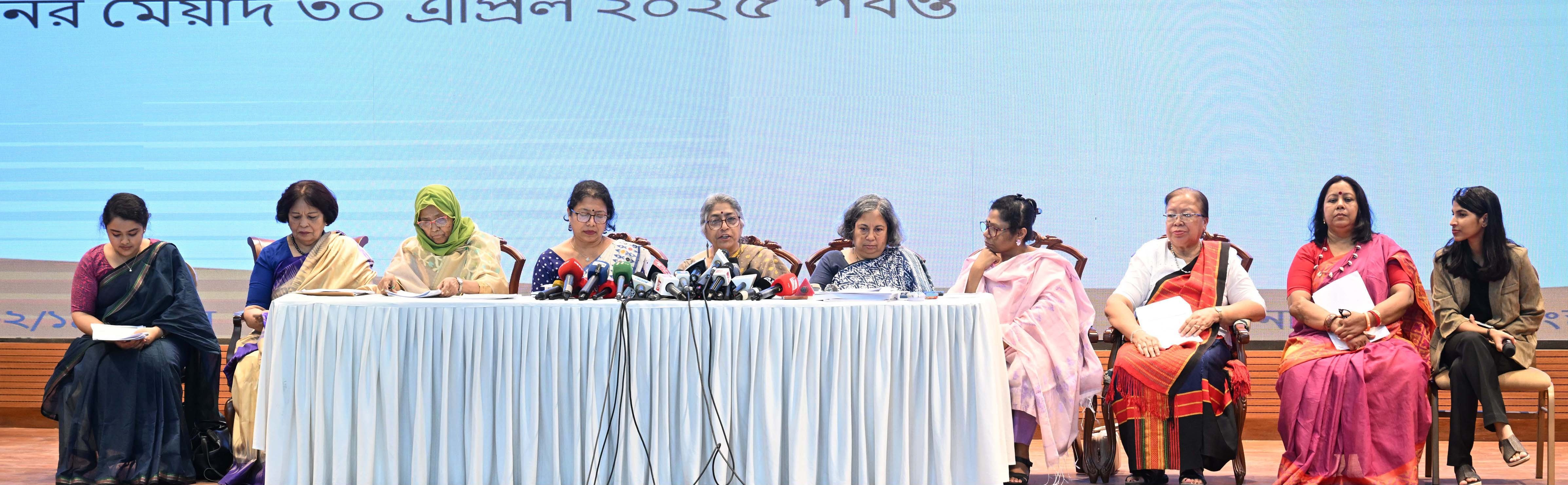
- Members in Press Conference at Foreign Service Academy

Reform Commission overview
- Formed: November 18, 2024; 21 months ago
- Dissolved: April 19, 2025; 16 months ago
- Jurisdiction: Bangladesh
- Headquarters: Ramna, Dhaka, Bangladesh
- Employees: 10
- Head responsible: Shireen Huq
- Parent department: Ministry of Women and Children Affairs
- Key document: July Charter
- Website: mowca.gov.bd

The Women's Affairs Reform Commission (Bengali: নারীবিষয়ক সংস্কার কমিশন, romanized: Nārībiṣôẏôk Sôṅskār Kômiśôn) was established by the interim government in November 2024 to prepare a report on women's equal rights, restoring their dignity, respect in society, and reducing the discrimination.

== Members ==
Name	Position	Background
Shirin Parvin Haque	Head of Commission	Founding Member, Naripokkho
Maheen Sultan	Member	Senior Fellow, BRAC Institute of Governance and Development
Sara Hossain	Member	Honorary Executive Director, Bangladesh Legal Aid and Services Trust
Fawzia Karim Firoze	Member	Senior Advocate, Supreme Court of Bangladesh and President, Foundation for Law & Development
Kalpona Akter	Member	President, Bangladesh Garment and Industrial Workers Federation
Halida Hanum Akhter	Member	Women Health Expert
Sumaiya Islam	Member	Executive Director, Bangladesh Nari Sramik Kendra
Nirupa Dewan	Member	Former Member, National Human Rights Commission
Ferdousi Sultana	Member	Former Senior Social Development Adviser, Asian Development Bank
Nishita Jaman Niha	Member	Student Representative

== Report and proposals ==
On 19 April 2025, following the commission's reform report being made public, it was criticized by the public. The report contained 443 proposals on 15 different subjects, including marriage for women of all religions through uniform family law, recognition of sex workers as workers, removal of Muslim inheritance law, expanding the number of parliamentary seats to 600, and reserving 300 of those for women.

== Criticism ==
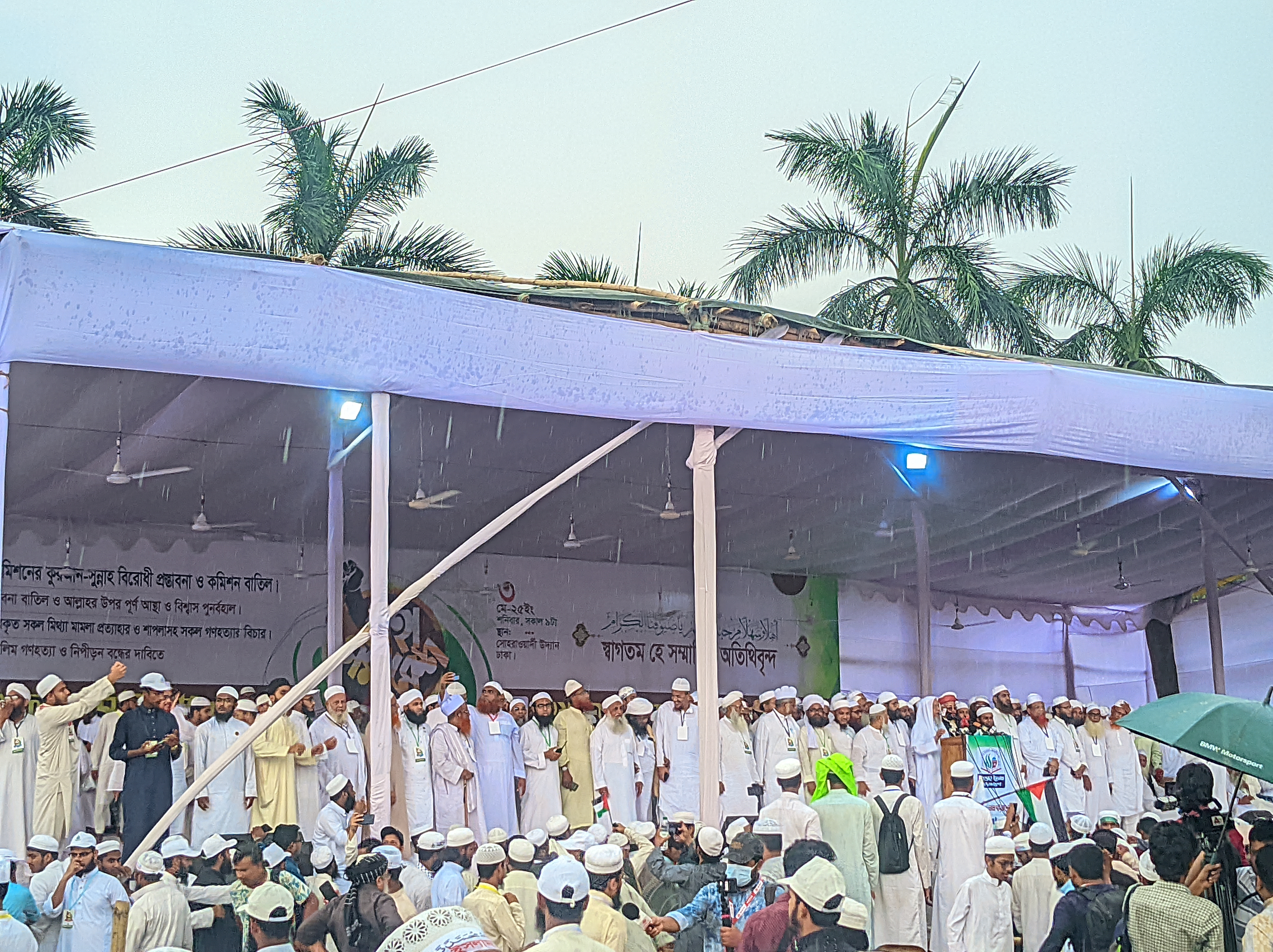
Hefazat's Grand Rally protesting the WARC report

Many organizations opposed the proposals, calling them anti-religious, immoral, unconstitutional, and undemocratic. Several Islamist parties have demanded the abolision and reform of the commission.

The National Citizen Party (NCP) expressed its dismay at some recommendations of the report of the Women's Affairs Reform Commission, calling them "dialectal" to the social and religious values of Bangladesh, and urged constructive dialogue with representative stakeholders in this regard. Nevertheless, some of its leaders were seen criticising Hefazat-e-Islam, accusing it of violent rhetoric and hate speech against women in their rally over the report of the commission while other leaders actively participated in Hefazat organized events.

On 16 May, counter protests were led by various leftist and feminist organisations.

== See also ==
- Constitutional Reform Commission
- Reform Commissions of Bangladesh
