= Sreelatha =

Sreelatha may refer to:

- Sreelatha Namboothiri, an Indian singer
- Srilatha Batliwala, an Indian social activist
- Kannur Sreelatha, an Indian actress

== See also ==
- Sri (disambiguation)
- Latha (disambiguation)
