= Maheen Sultan =

Maheen Sultan is a Bangladeshi academic and development practitioner. She is a Senior Fellow of Practice at the BRAC Institute of Governance and Development, BRAC University. She is a member of the Women's Reform Commission of the Muhammad Yunus-led Interim government.

== Career ==
Sultan has worked in the development sector for over 25 years, holding positions in non-governmental organizations, the United Nations, Grameen Bank, and the Government of Bangladesh. Her work has focused on social development, poverty, civil society, community participation, and gender equality.

Sultan worked as a programm officer of the United Nations Development Programme from 1986 to 1990. She then worked as a Programme of Officer Human and Institutional Development at the Swiss Agency for Development and Cooperation.

Sultan was a founding member of the Centre for Gender and Social Transformation at BRAC University, which later became part of BIGD. The centre conducts research and policy engagement on gender and social transformation in South Asia. In August 2021, she attended a dialogue with Commerce Minister Tipu Munshi. In September 2022, she spoke on people of chars (river islands) at 'The existing situation of child marriage in char and haor areas and the way ahead', a round table conference organized by CARE Bangladesh and Prothom Alo with the financial backing of the United States Agency for International Development.

Sultan is a member of Naripokkho, a Bangladeshi women's rights organization. After the fall of the Sheikh Hasina-led Awami League government, she was appointed a member of the Women's Reform Commission of the Muhammad Yunus-led Interim government. The commission submitted its report in April 2025 to Muhammad Yunus.

In June, Sultan spoke at the round table titled "How the Democratic Transformation of the State Can Happen" at the Prothom Alo office. Other participants included Ali Riaz, Badiul Alam Majumdar, and Matiur Rahman. She has been critical of the government of Bangladesh removing Sharifa's tale, a story of a transgender woman, from textbooks following pressure from Islamists.

== Selected works ==
- Voicing Demands: Feminist Activism in Transitional Contexts*. Co-edited with Srilatha Batliwala. Zed Books, 2014. ISBN 9781780324410.
