= ZI Khan Panna =

Bangladeshi lawyer and activist

ZI Khan Panna is a Bangladeshi lawyer and human rights activist. He is the chairman of Ain O Salish Kendra, a legal aid organisation in Bangladesh. Panna is a trustee of the Bangladesh Legal Aid and Services Trust. He is the chairman of the legal aid committee of Bangladesh Bar Council.

== Career ==
In 2005, Panna filed a petition on behalf of the Bangladesh Bar Council asking the government to explain its failure to arrest those involved in bombing a court on 17 August.

Panna challenged the indemnity ordinance for security officers involved in Operation Clean Heart in 2012 leading it to be revoked by Bangladesh High Court. In November 2014, he served legal notices to three ministers, Mosharraf Hossain, Saifuzzaman Chowdhury, and Zahid Maleque, to resign as they were holding for profit offices while serving as ministers violating the constitution of Bangladesh. In 2015, he questioned the state of democracy in Bangladesh.

In March 2018, Panna was attacked on the University of Dhaka campus by unknown individuals. In 2020, he filed a petition seeking a ban on the sale of weapons from Bangladesh Liberation War. He called for investigation of attacks on religious minorities in Bangladesh.

Panna has spoken against the Assassination of Sheikh Mujibur Rahman and passage of the Indemnity Ordinance, 1975 to protect the assassins. In November 2021, Panna criticized the verdict in the rain tree rape case against the son of the owner of Apan Jewellers and said it was wrong for the judge to ask the police to not accept rape complaints 72 hours after the incident.

In 2022, Panna represented a Canadian citizen who was forcefully confined by her parents in their Dhaka residence.

Panna filed a petition at the Bangladesh High Court seeking an end to sexual harassment at educational institutions in Bangladesh in January 2023 representing the Ain O Salish Kendra. He has spoken against emerging conflicts between judges and Awami League backed district bar association leaders and court officers. According to him this conflict is harming the justice system. He represented Pori Moni in a narcotics case.

== Activism ==
In August 2025, Z. I. Khan Panna was named one of the coordinators of Moncho 71, a civic platform formed to preserve the legacy of Bangladesh's Liberation War and to safeguard the dignity of freedom fighters. The platform declared a five-point demand, including rejecting distortions of the 1971 war, protecting freedom fighters from collective blame, and treating disrespect toward the Liberation War as treason.
