= Operation Clean Heart =

Joint operation in Bangladesh in 2003

- Part of Crime in Bangladesh and Maoist insurgency in Bangladesh
Date	16 October 2002 – 9 January 2003
Location	Bangladesh
Result	Bangladesh government Victory

Belligerents
Government of Bangladesh; Ministry of Home Affairs (Bangladesh); Bangladesh Rifles; Bangladesh Police; Bangladesh Ansar; Ministry of Defence; Bangladesh Armed Forces; Bangladesh Army; Bangladesh Navy; DGFI	Criminal Gangs; Maoist Insurgents

Commanders and leaders
Khaleda Zia	No centralized leadership

Strength
40,000	Unknown

Casualties and losses
Negligible	Hundreds injured 11,245 arrested 40 died in custody
- Unknown civilian casualties

Operation Clean Heart was an anti-crime operation jointly carried out by Bangladesh Army, Bangladesh Navy, Bangladesh Rifles, Bangladesh Police and Bangladesh Ansar members in Bangladesh. The operation was carried by the government of Bangladesh headed by the Bangladesh Nationalist Party.

== Operation ==
The operation took place from 16 October 2002 to 9 January 2003 led by Bangladesh Army. Brad Adams of Human Rights Watch criticised the shoot at sight order given by the Dhaka Metropolitan Police Commissioner Ashraful Huda to the police during the operation phrase. More than 40,000 security personnel participated in the operation. The security forces included 24,023 army personnel and 339 navy personnel along with personnel from Bangladesh Police, Bangladesh Ansar, and Bangladesh Rifles. The joint forces arrested 11,245 suspects during the course of the operation. It seized 2,028 firearms and nearly 30,000 bullets.

Hundreds were injured and 44 died in custody. Human Rights Watch had claimed 60 people were killed in the operation. The Government of Bangladesh claimed 12 of those deaths in custody were from heart attacks. Awami League leader Saber Hossain Chowdhury and Sheikh Fazlul Karim Selim, cousin of former Prime Minister Sheikh Hasina, were detained during the operation. The Army also raided the Awami League office and seized documents.

On 9 January 2003, Bangladesh government created an indemnity law, that provided legal protection to security personnel who participated in the operation. It was approved in the parliament of Bangladesh on 24 February 2003. Sultana Kamal, activist, criticized the indemnity ordinance. Justice Shamsuddin Chowdhury Manik criticized the drive and indemnity ordinance. After the operation ended, Rapid Action Battalion was created in 2004 with personnel from Bangladesh Police, Bangladesh Ansar, Bangladesh Rifles, Bangladesh Army, Bangladesh Air Force, and Bangladesh Navy.

== Legacy ==
Z I Khan Panna, a lawyer of the Bangladesh Supreme Court, had filed a petition against the indemnity ordinance on 14 June 2012. He was represented by Shahdeen Malik. On 29 July 2012, justices Mirza Hussain Haider and Kazi Md. Ejarul Haque Akondo asked the government of Bangladesh to explain why it should not declare the ordinance illegal and order it pay 1 billion taka compensation to the victims. In November 2015, the Bangladesh High Court declared the indemnity ordinance illegal and scrapped it. The verdict was given by Justice Moyeenul Islam Chowdhury and Justice Ashraful Kamal of the High Court Division.

Prime Minister Sheikh Hasina referred to Operation Clean Heart when defending her administrations record on human rights on 16 August 2020 following criticism by Bangladesh Nationalist Party which was in power when the operation was launched.

== Deaths in the operation ==
Name	Age	Profession	Date Detained	Date died	Remarks	Location	Ref
Shafiqul Islam	16	Jatiyotabadi Chattra Dol Activist	17 October 2003	17 October 2003	Killed in firing on protestors	Bogra	
Md. Yakub Ali	40	Bangladesh Nationalist Party activist	17 October 2003	17 October 2003	Died in custody	Dhaka	
Jahangir Hossain	38	Bangladesh Nationalist Party activist	17 October 2003	17 October 2003	Died in custody	Dhaka	
Abul Khayer Molla	50	Bangladesh Nationalist Party activist	19 October 2003	19 October 2003	Died in Gopalganj Sadar Hospital after detention	Gopalganj	
Afzal Hossain	25	Bangladesh Nationalist Party activist	21 October 2003	21 October 2003	Died in Savar Combined Military Hospital after detention	Savar	
Amirul Islam Rocket	35	Awami League Bhola District GS	22 October 2003	22 October 2003	Died in Bhola Sadar Hospital after detention	Bhola	
Saifuzzaman			21 October 2003	22 October 2003		Gaibandha	
Nazmul Islam Milan	40	Awami Jubo League activist	23 October 2003	23 October 2003	Died in Rajshahi Medical College hours after detention	Rajshahi	
Abdul Aziz Sardar	47	Bangladesh Nationalist Party activist	23 October 2003	25 October 2003		Pangsha	
Khorshed	35	labourer	26 October 2003	26 October 2003	Beaten while sleeping by army soldiers	Ramgati	
Masum Biswas	38	Awami Jubo League activist	27 October 2003	27 October 2003	Cousin of Sheikh Helal, member of parliament	Dhaka	
Kala Chand Tripura		police constable	28 October 2003	28 October 2003	Died in Chittagong Medical College Hospital	Chitttagong	
Abul Hossain Litu	27	Farmer	28 October 2003	28 October 2003	Army claimed died while trying to escape	Savar	
Jamir Uddin			29 October 2003	29 October 2003	Died in Gopalganj Thana Health Complex	Golapganj	
Abu Syed Delu	22		29 October 2003	29 October 2003	Died in Chest Disease Hospital	Dhaka	
Jennifer Syed King	25	Jatiyatabadi Chhatra Dal activist	29 October 2003	30 October 2003		Panchagar	
Tota Mia	37	Awami Jubo League activist	30 October 2003	30 October 2003	Died within hours of detention	Madaripur	
Mizanur Rahman Busha	40	Jubo Dal activist	29 October 2003	1 November 2003		Chuadanga	
Lebu Mia	45	Farmer	30 October 2003	1 November 2003		Habiganj	
Abdul Haque	32	Microbus driver	25 October 2003	4 November 2003	Osmani Medical College Hospital	Sylhet	
Rashedul Hasan	35	Assistant film director	2 November 2003	7 November 2003			
Saiful Islam	22	Jubo Dal activist	8 November 2003	8 November 2003	Feni Sadar Hospital	Feni	
Abu Sufian	30		9 November 2003	9 November 2003	Died in Bangladesh Army camp Mohammadpur	Dhaka	
Haji Abul Kashem	73		1 November 2003	10 November 2003	Tangail General Hospital	Tangail	
Zahirul Islam Mia	25	Jubo Dal activist	19 November 2003	19 November 2003	Mitford Hospital	Dhaka	
Unidentified	40		19 November 2003	19 November 2003	Mitford Hospital; Army gave to police in critical condition	Dhaka	
Tasu Mia	45	Businessman	19 November 2003	20 November 2003	Army claimed he was hit by a bus	Dhaka	
Masum	30		19 November 2003	21 November 2003	Dhaka Medical College and Hospital	Dhaka	
Hakim		Labourer	13 November 2003	21 November 2003	Injured in a crossfire with army and criminals	Dhaka	
Shariful Mallik	26		1 November 2003	21 November 2003	Died on way to Khulna Medical College Hospital	Khulna	
Arju Mia	38		25 November 2003	21 November 2003	Gazipur Sadar Hospital	Gazipur	
Tipu Biswas	35	Jubo Dal activist	30 November 2003	30 November 2003	Died in Army custody	Khulna	
Abdus Sattar		Businessman	10 December 2003	10 December 2003	Bogra Mohammad Ali Hospital	Bogra	
Nabi Hossain Kahn	50	Rickshawpuller	14 December 2003	14 December 2003	Found dead in a pond after being detained by the Army	Narsinghdi	
Jasim Uddin	25		15 December 2003	15 December 2003	Combined Military Hospital	Dhaka	
Shafiuddin Swapan	35	Jubo Dal activist	16 December 2003	16 December 2003	Dhaka Medical College and Hospital	Dhaka	
Omar Faruk	46		15 December 2003	16 December 2003	Brother of Bangladesh Nationalist Party activist	Dhaka	
Ibrahim Khalil Ibu		Chhatra League activist	15 December 2003	16 December 2003	Dhaka Medical College and Hospital	Dhaka	
Mir Jahirul Rabin	22	Tejgaon College student	4 December 2003	16 December 2003	Dhaka Medical College and Hospital	Dhaka	
Abu Barek Rubel	24		16 December 2003	16 December 2003	Boalkhali Hospital	Boalkhali	
Yusuf	34		20 December 2003	20 December 2003	Combined Military Hospital	Dhaka	
Mohammad Rashed	25		25 December 2003	25 December 2003		Sandwip	
Unidentified		leader of an outlaw party	6 January 2004	6 January 2004	Died a few hours after detention	Pabna	
Abdul Khaleq Sarkar	28	Businessman	8 January 2004	8 January 2004	Gazipur Sadar Hospital	Gazipur	

== See also ==
- Operation Devil Hunt
