= Hameeda Hossain =

Bangladeshi lawyer and activist

- হামিদা হোসেন
- Born: 1936 (age 89–90); Hyderabad, Sindh, British India (now in Pakistan)
- Education: Wellesley College; Oxford University (PhD)
- Spouse: Kamal Hossain (m. 1964)

Hameeda Hossain (née Akhund; born 1936) is a Bangladeshi human rights activist and academic. She has published many books and articles relating to human rights and women's issues in Bangladesh, in Islam, and worldwide. She is a founding member of Ain o Salish Kendra, a legal aid and human rights organization.

In 1969, in the then East Pakistan, along with economist Rehman Sobhan she founded English-language monthly current affairs magazine, Forum. The magazine became renowned for its outspoken criticism against the West Pakistani establishment, and advocacy of democracy and economic reforms in the Pakistani union.

Hossain is a member of the board of directors of the Centre for Secular Space, an international human rights organization that stands for International Defense Against Religious Extremism.

== Early life and education ==
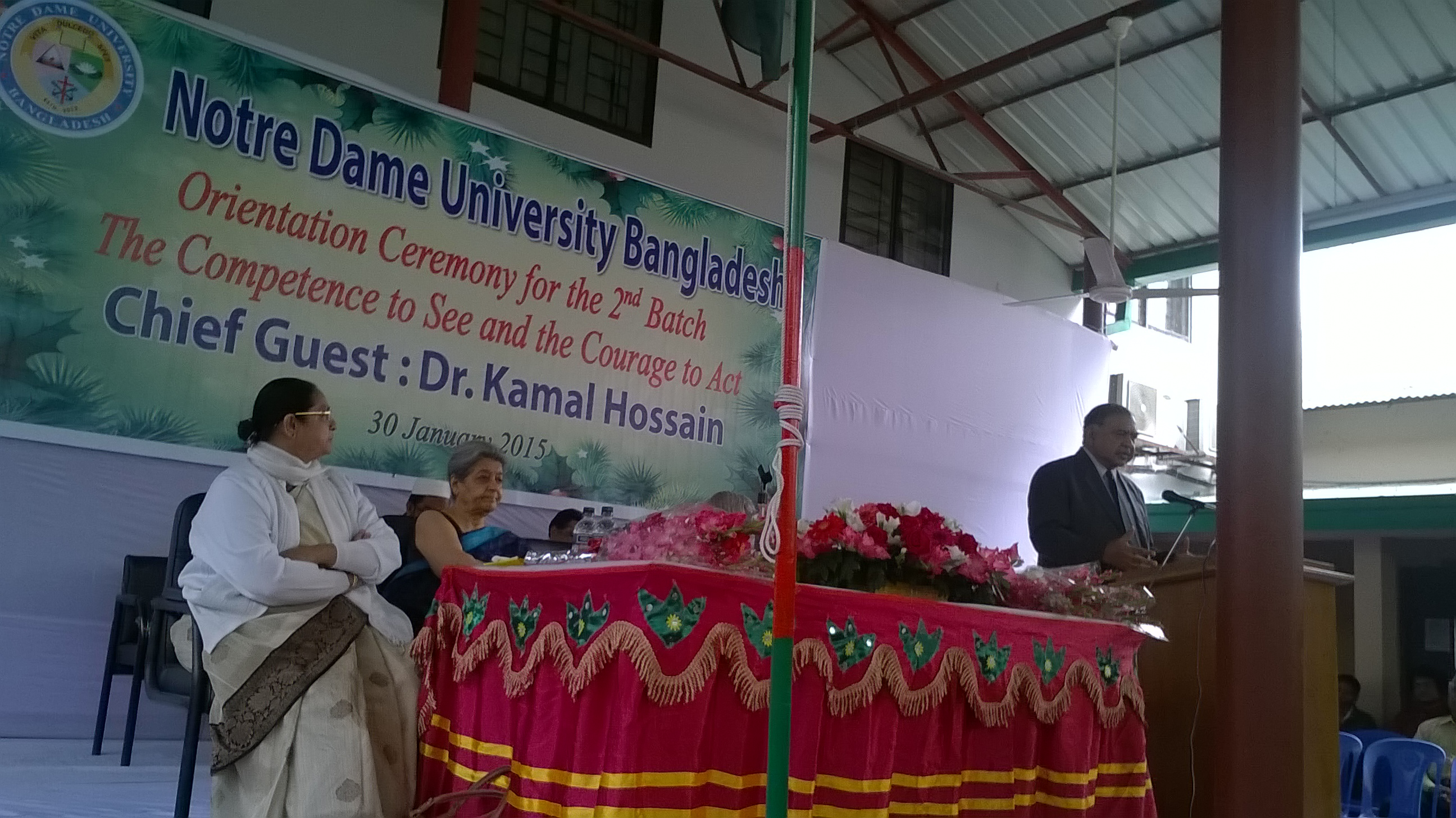
Hossain (in the middle) at the Orientation Ceremony for the 2nd batch of Notre Dame University Bangladesh (2015)

Hameeda was born on December 28, 1936 to a Sunni Muslim Sindhi family of Akhunds in Hyderabad, Sindh (present-day Pakistan). Her father, Abdullah Shafi Muhammad Akhund was a judge posted to various cities in the British Raj. Her mother was raised in Turkey and returned to Bengal aged sixteen where she got married. Hameeda was the youngest of three girls and three boys.

The children lived with their mother in Karachi. She attended a convent school in Karachi. She graduated from Wellesley College in the US and earned a PhD from Oxford University.

== Personal life ==
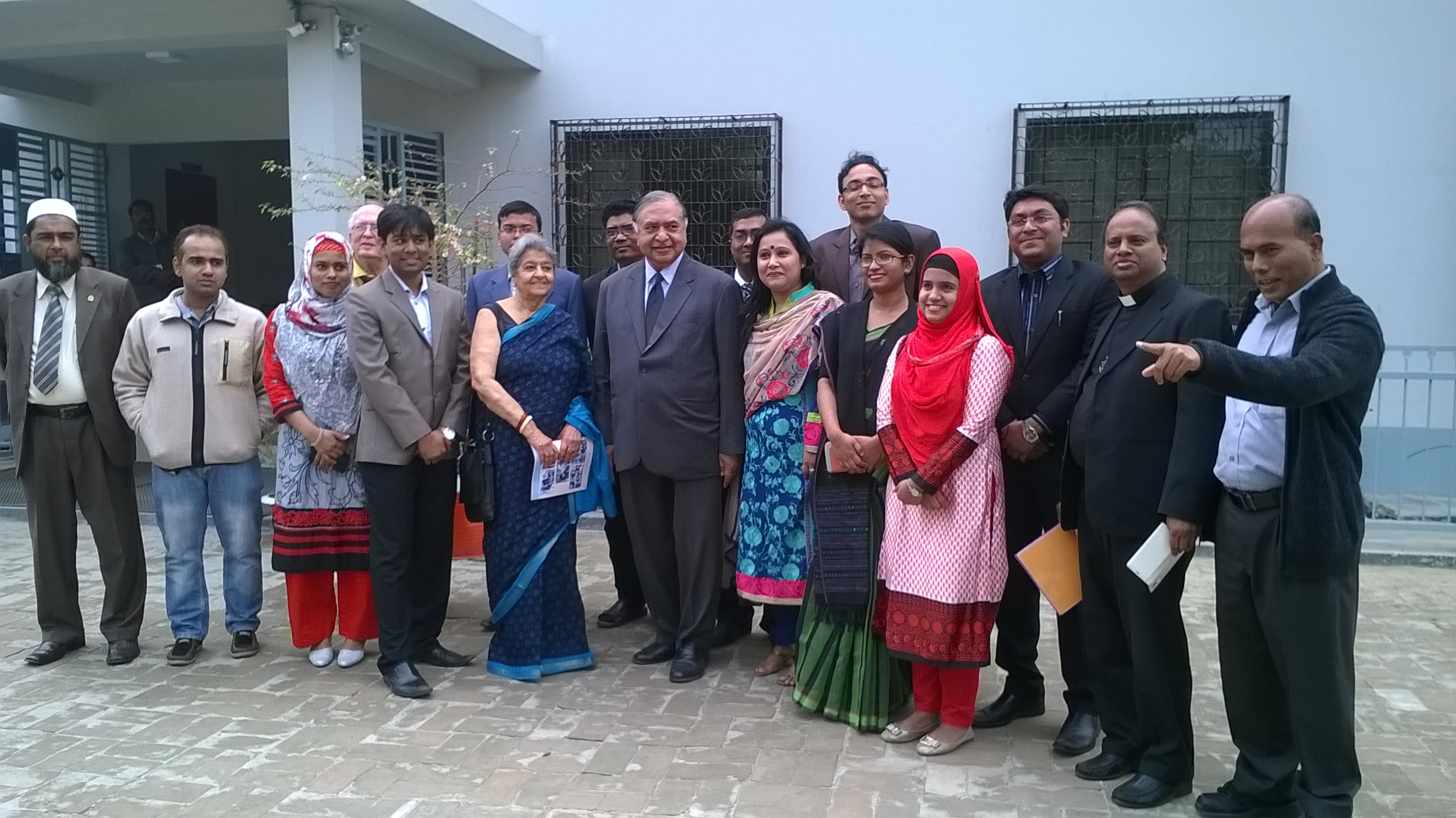
Hameeda and Kamal among the NDUB faculty members

Hossain is married to Kamal Hossain since 1964. Kamal has been the president of the Gano Forum political party in Bangladesh since he founded it in 1992. They have two daughters, including Dina Hossain, a film maker, and Sara Hossain, a lawyer and writer who is the co-editor of 'Honor': Crimes, Paradigms and Violence Against Women.
