= Joint Drive Indemnity Ordinance, 2003 =

Jatiya Sangsad (Bangladesh Parliament)
- Long title: An Ordinance to provide indemnity to members of the joint forces and others involved in Operation Clean Heart.
- Citation: Ordinance No. I of 2003 / Act No. I of 2003
- Territorial extent: Bangladesh
- Enacted by: Government of Bangladesh
- Enacted: 24 February 2003
- Assented to: 9 January 2003 (Ordinance)
- Repealed: 13 September 2015 (declared unconstitutional)
- Status: Struck down

Joint Drive Indemnity Ordinance, 2003 (Bengali: যৌথ অভিযান দায়মুক্তি অধ্যাদেশ, ২০০৩), later enacted as the Joint Drive Indemnity Act, 2003, was a law in Bangladesh that granted blanket immunity to members of the security forces and government officials involved in Operation Clean Heart. The ordinance was promulgated on 9 January 2003 and later passed in Parliament on 24 February 2003. It prevented any legal or disciplinary action for acts committed during the operation period between 16 October 2002 and 9 January 2003. In September 2015, the High Court Division declared the law unconstitutional and void ab initio.

== Background ==
Operation Clean Heart was a military-led anti-crime operation carried out by the Bangladesh Army, Bangladesh Police, Bangladesh Rifles (now Border Guard Bangladesh), Ansar, and other security agencies between 16 October 2002 and 9 January 2003. It was launched under the BNP-led government with the stated aim of restoring law and order.

During the operation, thousands of people were arrested and detained, and reports of custodial deaths and torture emerged from human rights organisations such as Amnesty International and Human Rights Watch.

== Enactment and challenge ==
The government promulgated the Joint Drive Indemnity Ordinance, 2003 on 9 January 2003, immediately after the operation ended, using presidential powers under the Constitution since Parliament was not in session. When Parliament reconvened, the Bangladesh Nationalist Party-Jamaat-e-Islami coalition government passed the measure as the Joint Drive Indemnity Act, 2003 on 24 February 2003.

In June 2012, Supreme Court lawyer ZI Khan Panna filed a writ petition challenging the constitutionality of the Act, arguing that it violated fundamental rights including the right to life, equality before the law, and protection of law.

On 29 July 2012, the High Court issued a rule asking the government to explain why the Act should not be declared void and why a compensation fund should not be established for victims of the operation.

=== High Court verdict ===
On 13 September 2015, a bench of Justice Moyeenul Islam Chowdhury and Justice Ashraful Kamal delivered its verdict declaring the Joint Drive Indemnity Act, 2003 unconstitutional and void ab initio. The court held that:

- Parliament cannot enact laws that contradict the fundamental rights guaranteed by the Constitution.
- The Act violated Articles 27, 31, and 32 of the Constitution, which guarantee equality before law, protection of law, and right to life.
- Victims and their families are entitled to pursue legal remedies through criminal and civil courts.

The court declined to order a general compensation fund but permitted individual victims to seek redress through the judicial process.

== Provisions ==
The Act provided that:

- No suit, prosecution, or other legal proceeding could be initiated or continued against any person for acts done in connection with Operation Clean Heart between 16 October 2002 and 9 January 2003.
- Such immunity applied to all members of the joint forces, government officials, or any person acting under their authority.
- Courts were barred from entertaining complaints or petitions regarding deaths, injuries, or damage caused during the operation.

Legal scholars have noted that the law was enacted under the authority of Article 46 of the Constitution of Bangladesh, which allows Parliament to make indemnity laws, but that it conflicted with fundamental rights under Part III of the Constitution.

== Aftermath ==
Following the verdict, victims of Operation Clean Heart gained the right to file cases against security personnel. The ruling was hailed by human rights groups as a milestone in restoring accountability and strengthening judicial review in Bangladesh.

The decision reinforced the constitutional doctrine that no law can override fundamental rights, even under indemnity powers, and contributed to developing Bangladesh’s jurisprudence on public law compensation.

== Criticism ==
The ordinance and subsequent Act drew widespread criticism from legal experts, journalists, and human rights organisations. Critics argued that the law denied victims and their families access to justice and compensation for alleged torture and custodial deaths, encouraged a culture of impunity among law enforcement agencies, and conflicted with constitutional guarantees of equality and due process.

Amnesty International and Human Rights Watch both condemned the law, stating that it violated Bangladesh’s obligations under international human rights treaties and undermined the rule of law.

== See also ==
- Operation Clean Heart
- Indemnity Ordinance, 1975
- Constitution of Bangladesh
- Fundamental rights in Bangladesh
