= Shamsul Bari =

Bangladeshi diplomat

Shamsul Bari is the Chairman of Research Initiatives, Bangladesh and a former director of the United Nations High Commissioner for Refugees. He is the vice chairman of Bangladesh Legal Aid and Services Trust.

== Career ==
Shamsul Bari worked as a lawyer in Bangladesh. He also taught at the Universities of Chicago. Shamsul Bari served at the United Nations High Commissioner for Refugees for 20 years. In 1985, he was the Chief of the General Legal Section of the United Nations High Commissioner for Refugees. In 1989, Shamsul Bari was the deputy director of the Division of Refugee Law & Doctrine of the United Nations High Commissioner for Refugees.

He founded Research Initiatives, Bangladesh in 2002. from 2002 to 2009, he served in the Netherlands Development Assistance Research Council ( RAWOO) of the Ministry of Foreign Affairs (Netherlands). He is a director of Legal Action Worldwide.

In 2008, he was appointed the Independent Expert on the situation of human rights in Somalia. In January 2010, he issued a warning for Puntland and Somalia. He co-chaired the Transparency Advisory Group which was established in 2011.
