= David Bergman (journalist) =

British journalist

- Born: c. 1965
- Education: University of Birmingham
- Occupation: Journalist
- Known for: Activism in Bhopal disaster; His reporting on war crimes during the Bangladesh Liberation War
- Spouse: Sara Hossain
- Relatives: Kamal Hossain (father in-law)
- Awards: Royal Television Society

David Bergman (born c. 1965) is a British investigative journalist. Bergman has worked for Bangladeshi and British newspapers. He was first known in Bangladesh for his reporting on war crimes committed during the Bangladesh Liberation War. An investigative documentary on the subject he worked as a reporter and researcher for British television in 1995 won an award. Twenty years later, he was convicted of contempt of court by Bangladesh's special war crimes tribunal in 2015 for contradicting the official death toll of the war. Bergman has also contributed to The New York Times and Foreign Policy.

Bergman is a editor and contributor to Netra News, a Bangladeshi news website funded by National Endowment for Democracy, a non-government, bipartisan, US-based organisation, funded by the US Congress and based in Sweden. He was interviewed for the Al Jazeera documentary All the Prime Minister's Men.

Bergman was the executive director of the Centre for Corporate Accountability, which promoted the enactment of the Corporate Manslaughter and Corporate Homicide Act 2007 in the United Kingdom.

== Personal ==
David Bergman is the son of Alan Bergman from Hadley Wood, in north London. He holds degrees in both politics and law and his law degree is from the University of Birmingham. Bergman is married to Bangladeshi lawyer and writer Sara Hossain, who is the co-editor of 'Honor': Crimes, Paradigms and Violence Against Women. His father-in-law is Dr. Kamal Hossain, who has been the president of the Gano Forum political party in Bangladesh since he founded it in 1992.

== Activism in Bhopal ==
Gita Sahgal, who later produced War Crimes File, said she first met Bergman when he was politically active in the relief work after the Bhopal disaster in India. Bergman first traveled from Birmingham, England, to Bhopal in March 1986 by bicycle as a charity to raise £5,000 for the victims of the disaster. While there, he became entangled in a legal dispute over the government's role in relief that The Guardian later dubbed "The Bergman Affair". Other organizations providing relief to the victims of the Bhopal disaster said they were harassed or prevented from being effective because of government intervention.

In September 1986, when Bergman was 21 years old, he was held in custody in violation of India's Foreigners Act and National Security Act and was accused of working for Union Carbide. Around the time of his detention, Bergman was on a hunger strike and also suffering from hepatitis, and although he requested the court allow him to travel for treatment his request was denied, as was his father's intervention on behalf of his son's health. He denied the charges as a form of harassment and challenged the lower courts decision. His case was heard before the Supreme Court, and the high court decided in his favour and also allowed for his continued stay in India to take part in the relief efforts. Later, the Supreme Court intervened again and forced the lower court to dismiss the charges. Bergman later spoke to the media for the Bhopal Action Group, London, and argued against the sabotage theory advocated by Union Carbide and in favour of design flaws as the cause. He also published an article in a law journal about these competing views.

== Workers' rights ==
Bergman was affiliated with the Centre for Corporate Accountability as its executive director for nine years before stepping down in 2009 when it closed. While at this organization, Bergman worked on legal issues related to workers' safety issues and the Centre supported the Corporate Manslaughter and Corporate Homicide Act 2007. The law went into effect in 2008 and allows corporations to be charged with manslaughter that occurs inside the jurisdiction of the United Kingdom, including multinationals.

== Journalism ==
David Bergman is an investigative journalist and previously worked for the UK's Twenty Twenty. He has formerly worked at several Bangladeshi newspapers, including New Age, The Daily Star and bdnews24.com. In addition to writing for Bangladeshi papers, Bergman has contributed to Foreign Policy and The Economist. His coverage of the International War Crimes Tribunal appeared in The Independent newspaper.

Between 1999 and 2009, Bergman headed the human rights organisation Centre for Corporate Accountability and advocated for legal reforms on work-related deaths.

== Notable works of journalism ==
=== Bangladesh war crimes ===
Bergman was the reporter and researcher behind the 1995 documentary film War Crimes File that was aired on British TV Channel 4 about the 1971 Bangladesh atrocities. The film was produced by Gita Sahgal, director of this film was Howard Bradburn, made with the assistance of Bangladeshi filmmaker Tareque Masud, and created for Twenty Twenty. The program received a special commendation in the "Best International Current Affairs Award" category from the Royal Television Society in 1995, which was for its "courageous exposé of Islamic extremists now living in Britain". The film was subjected to a libel charge by the men featured in the film.

Bergman's personal blog Bangladesh Politico follows the proceedings of the International Crimes Tribunal of Bangladesh, a tribunal set up with solely domestic judges to use domestic law.

Bergman published a controversial opinion article, "A crucial period for International Crimes Tribunal", in New Age on 2 October 2011 that was seen as contempt by Justice Md Nizamul Huq, Justice A. T. M. Fazle Kabir and A. K. M. Zahir Ahmed, although the body exonerated Bergman and his publisher, it warned them to be more careful. In December 2012, Justice Mohammed Nizamul Huq resigned for Skype Scandal between the justice and Ahmed Ziauddin that compromised the fairness of the tribunal were revealed on YouTube and in publications such as The Economist and Amar Desh. Elsewhere in the media, Bergman has criticised the due process procedures of the International Crimes Tribunal as flawed. He has been critical of the tribunal's due process and principles in following rule of law. Bangladesh's tribunal raised a further contempt charge against Bergman in April 2014 concerning three articles he had published on his blog about the court. At issue is his writings about how many people died during the Bangladesh Liberation War with the court using the official figure of three million and Bergman saying that number is disputed by evidence. He was convicted by that court at the end of 2014, where it was proclaimed that he "hurt the feelings of the nation."

Bergman has often appeared on the Al Jazeera show Inside Story as a political commentator on Bangladesh.

In February 2021, Bergman appeared in the Al Jazeera documentary All the Prime Minister's Men which exposed corruption allegations against the Bangladesh Army's 16th chief of staff Aziz Ahmed. The army chief allegedly arranged presidential pardons for his brothers who have been fugitives from Bangladeshi law with convictions for murder and other crimes. The Bangladeshi government statement in response to the documentary mentioned Bergman, Jamaat and said that it "regrets that Al Jazeera has allowed itself to become an instrument for their malicious political designs aimed at destabilizing the secular democratic Government of Bangladesh". In response to a question from a local journalist on the documentary, Prime Minister Sheikh Hasina remarked "Some bizarre interactions always happen in Bangladesh’s politics when the line between the ultra-left and the ultra-right blurs". Shahidul Alam, writing in the New Age, advised the government to not slip on a banana peel.

== Blog and other writing ==
Bergman runs a personal blog called Bangladesh Politico. His criticism often focuses on Sheikh Hasina and her family. Bergman has been deeply critical of the Awami League's authoritarianism since Sheikh Hasina was re-elected in 2009. Bergman initially focused on the flaws of the war crimes tribunal set up by Sheikh Hasina's government in 2010. Since 2014, when the national election was boycotted by the opposition, Bergman became a fierce critic of Bangladesh's autocratic drift and human rights abuses by security agencies like the Rapid Action Battalion and the Directorate General of Forces Intelligence.

Bergman was also the former English language editor of Netra News. Apart from the Awami League, Bergman has been critical of Mahfuz Anam, BRAC, the London School of Economics, the Biden administration, the United Nations, Amnesty International India, the British High Commissioner to Bangladesh, the European Union Ambassador to Bangladesh, Tulip Siddiq, Boris Johnson, Dominic Raab and the British Labour Party.

== Works ==
- Bergman, David. "The sabotage theory and the legal strategy of Union Carbide," New Law Journal, 138, 17 June 1988.
- Bergman, David. (Director) "War Crimes Files" (documentary), Dispatches (program), Channel 4. 1995.
- —— (2 October 2011). "A crucial period for International Crimes Tribunal". New Age. Dhaka. Archived from the original on 21 October 2013.
- —— (15 February 2013). "My response to Tahmina Anam's article on 'Shahbag', 1971 war crimes trials in Bangladesh, and demands for hangings". Bangladesh Chronicle. Archived from the original on 7 February 2015.
- —— (16 May 2013). "Witness alleges state abduction". New Age. Dhaka. Archived from the original on 30 January 2014.
- —— (17 April 2014). "Questioning an Iconic Number". The Hindu.

== See also ==
- Al Jazeera controversies and criticism
