= Kamal Hossain =

Bangladeshi politician and lawyer (born 1937)

- কামাল হোসেন
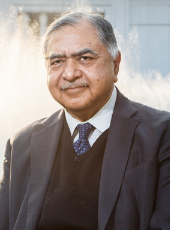
- Hossain in March 2013

2nd Law Minister of Bangladesh
- In office 12 January 1972 – 16 March 1973
- President: Abu Sayeed Chowdhury
- Prime Minister: Sheikh Mujibur Rahman
- Preceded by: Khondaker Mostaq Ahmed
- Succeeded by: Manoranjan Dhar

3rd Foreign Minister of Bangladesh
- In office 16 March 1973 – 15 August 1975
- President: Abu Sayeed Chowdhury; Mohammad Mohammadullah; Sheikh Mujibur Rahman
- Prime Minister: Sheikh Mujibur Rahman; Muhammad Mansur Ali
- Preceded by: Abdus Samad Azad
- Succeeded by: Abu Sayeed Chowdhury

2nd Minister of Power, Energy and Mineral Resources
- In office 27 January 1974 – 25 January 1975
- President: Mohammad Mohammadullah; Sheikh Mujibur Rahman
- Prime Minister: Sheikh Mujibur Rahman
- Preceded by: Mofiz Chowdhury
- Succeeded by: Unknown

Personal details
- Born: 20 April 1937 (age 89) Calcutta, Bengal, British India
- Party: Gano Forum; Awami League
- Spouse: Hameeda Hossain (m. 1963)
- Children: Sara Hossain, Dina Hossain
- Education: University of Notre Dame (BA); University of Oxford (BA, BCL, PhD)
- Occupation: Lawyer, politician and academic
- Known for: One of the key authors of the Constitution of Bangladesh

Kamal Hossain (born 20 April 1937), better known as Dr. Kamal, is a founding leader, lawyer and politician of Bangladesh. He is known as the "Father of the Bangladeshi Constitution" and regarded as an icon of secular democracy in the Indian subcontinent. Hossain currently heads his own law firm in Dhaka. He retired from political activities and from the post of president of Gano Forum in October 2023.

Hossain studied in the United States at the University of Notre Dame and in the United Kingdom at the University of Oxford. He was called to the bar of England and Wales in Lincoln's Inn in 1959. Hossain enrolled as an advocate in the High Court of East Pakistan. He worked on cases with prominent Pakistani lawyers early in his legal career, including with former Prime Minister Huseyn Shaheed Suhrawardy. Hossain often worked on missing persons cases during the regime of military ruler Ayub Khan. Between 1961 and 1968, he taught law at Dhaka University. Hossain was the lawyer for the Awami League and its leader Sheikh Mujibur Rahman during the Agartala Conspiracy Case. He was elected as the Vice Chairman of the Pakistan Bar Council in 1970 before the breakup of Pakistan. In 1971, he was part of the Awami League's negotiation team for the transfer of power after the 1970 general election. Hossain was imprisoned in West Pakistan with Sheikh Mujibur Rahman during the war of independence that transformed East Pakistan into Bangladesh.

Hossain served in Bangladesh's first post-independence government from 1972 to 1975 as Law Minister and chairman of the drafting committee in the Constituent Assembly. Hossain led the process which produced the 1972 Constitution of Bangladesh. Under Hossain's leadership of the drafting committee, Bangladesh became the first constitutionally secular state in South Asia. He then served as Foreign Minister, and led Bangladesh to join the United Nations in 1974. As Energy Minister, Hossain later enacted the Bangladesh Petroleum Act. Hossain's legal reforms were emulated in India and China, including in India's 42nd constitutional amendment and during the reform and opening up of China in energy law. Some of his reforms in Bangladesh were repealed by the military presidency of the late Major Ziaur Rahman in 1977. Secularism was reinstated in Bangladesh's constitution by the Supreme Court in 2010.

Hossain survived the 1975 Bangladesh coup while on a tour of Yugoslavia. He became based in Oxford University during the late 1970s as a visiting research fellow. In 1981, he ran as an opposition candidate for president against Abdus Sattar. Hossain fell out with Awami League president Sheikh Hasina during the 1990s, and formed the Gono Forum (People's Forum) party. Hossain has often worked with the United Nations and the Commonwealth of Nations. He was also considered as a candidate for the post of UN Secretary General.

Described by journalist Mizanur Rahman Khan as the "conscience of the nation", Hossain was compared to Adlai Stevenson by The New York Times in 1981. Hossain has been a leading lawyer in the field of human rights, energy law, corporate law and international arbitration. He served on the Iran-United States Claims Tribunal and as UN Special Rapporteur for Afghanistan. Hossain has been a member of tribunals dealing with maritime disputes between Malaysia and Singapore and Guyana and Suriname. He was a two-term member of the UN Compensation Commission. He is a former vice-president of the International Law Association, former president of the Bangladesh Supreme Court Bar Association; and chairman of the Bangladesh Legal Aid and Services Trust (BLAST) and the South Asian Institute of Advanced Legal and Human Rights Studies (SAILS).

== Early life ==
Kamal Hossain's family belongs to one of the zamindar families of Shayestabad in Barisal. The family claims descent from Ali, the fourth Caliph of Islam. His paternal grandfather, Syed Sadat Hossain, was the son-in-law of Mir Muazzam Hussain, the Nawab of Shayestabad. The area of Shaestabad was home to several Bengali zamindars. Hossain's father, Ahmed Hossain, was an early Bengali Muslim physician and MBBS holder in Calcutta, Bengal Presidency, British India. The elder Hossain was a relative of Huseyn Shaheed Suhrawardy, the third Prime Minister of Bengal and fifth Prime Minister of Pakistan.

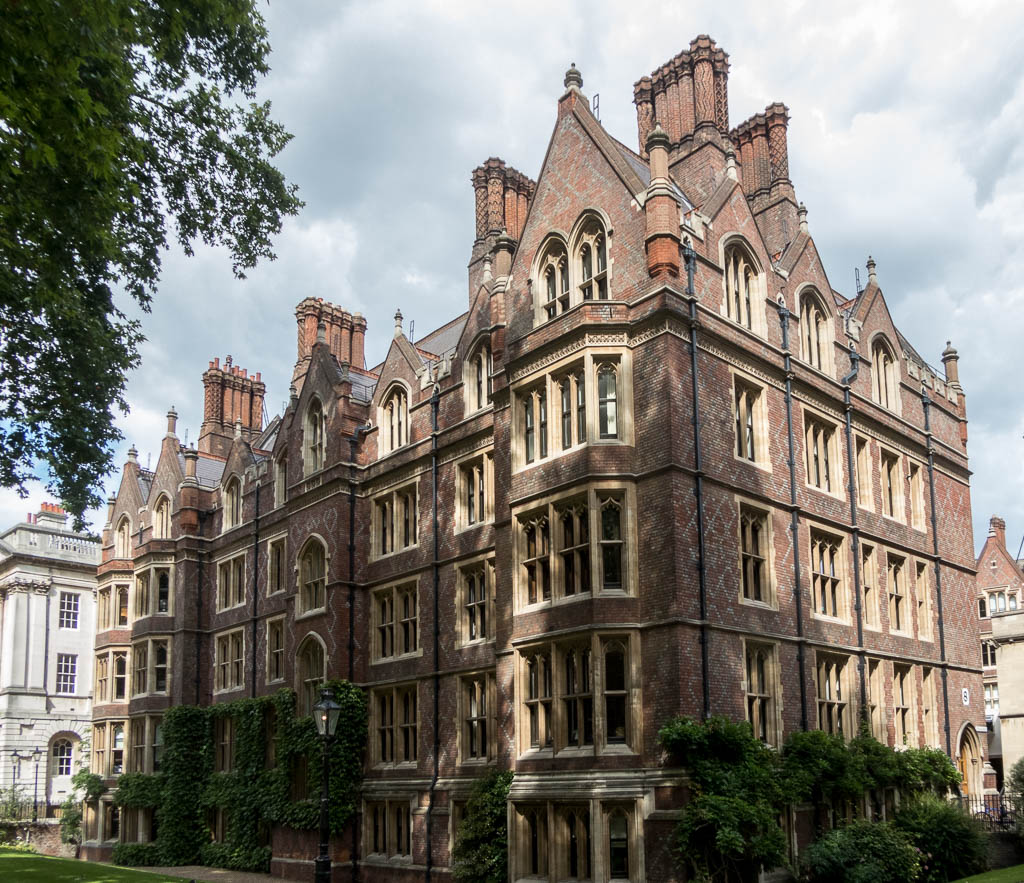
Lincoln's Inn

Kamal Hossain was born on 20 April 1937 in Calcutta. His family moved to Dhaka, East Bengal in 1949 after the partition of British India. Hossain attended St. Gregory's High School, where his classmates included the future academic Anisuzzaman. He received a two-year scholarship at the University of Notre Dame when he was aged 16, obtained a bachelor's degree in economics from Notre Dame, and later pursued a master's degree from the University of Michigan. Hossain's American classmates included Richard V. Allen, future national security advisor to President Ronald Reagan. In the U.S., he joined the Pakistan Students Association with fellow Bengalis Nurul Islam and Golam Wahed Choudhury. Hossain was a member of the association's leadership committee, which was led by Munir Ahmed Khan.

He has cited Justice Fazal Akbar as an inspiration to study law. Hossain moved to England from the U.S. in 1958, traveling to London by ship. In England, he met future professor Rehman Sobhan. In 1959, Hossain received a Bachelor of Civil Law degree from the University of Oxford and enrolled as a barrister in Lincoln's Inn. He also enrolled as an advocate in the High Court of East Pakistan. Hossain received a Doctor of Philosophy degree in international law from Oxford in 1964, with his dissertation "State Sovereignty and the United Nations Charter".

== East Pakistan ==
Hossain began his practice at Orr, Dignam and Co. which was one of the last remaining British law firms to continue practicing after the partition of India. Hossain was interviewed in Athens and offered a job at the company's Dhaka office; the firm had offices in Dhaka and Chittagong with an Irish solicitor and British barristers. He invited to join the firm by lawyer Abul Ahmad. At Original, Hossain worked with two Englishmen and Justice Mohammad Hossain. Hossain was at Original from 1959 to 1962, when he came into frequent contact with barrister and former prime minister Huseyn Shaheed Suhrawardy. Pakistan had come under military rule after a 1958 coup, and Hossain has recounted that he and Suhrawardy often zigzagged their car through Dhaka's streets to confuse (and evade) Pakistani-intelligence vehicles. Through Suhrawardy, Hossain came into contact with Sheikh Mujibur Rahman. He has said that Rahman predicted the collapse of Ayub Khan's regime in 10 years (which it did, in 1969).

Hossain defended Maulana Bhashani in a habeas corpus case. He was a lawyer for the English Rally brothers, who owned businesses in the Port of Narayanganj, and worked on a case for Chandranath Films. In 1963, Hossain began independent practice as a barrister. He represented The Daily Ittefaq, one of East Pakistan's largest Bengali-language newspapers, when it was banned by the Pakistani government. East Pakistan Chief Justice Badruddin Ahmed Siddiky told Hossain's lead counsel Mahmud Ali Kasuri to give the floor to Hossain during the Ittefaq case, and Kasuri obliged. The verdict favored Hossain and Kasuri.

He joined Dhaka University's Department of International Relations as a part-time lecturer in 1961, and later taught international law. Hossain's academic work at the university continued until 1969, and he was a staunch supporter of the six point movement.

During the Agartala Conspiracy Case, Hossain prepared the writ petition and worked on the case with Queen's Counsel Thomas William. In 1967, 1968 and 1969, he was elected vice-chairman of the East Pakistan Bar Council (now the Bangladesh Bar Council). Hossain was elected the last vice-chairman of the All-Pakistan Bar Council in 1969. In 1969 and 1970, he was involved in the round-table conferences between the government of Pakistan and major opposition parties led by the Awami League and Sheikh Mujibur Rahman.

Kamal Hossain was the Awami League's chief political negotiator. After the 1970 Pakistani general election, Sheikh Mujib vacated one of his seats in Dacca and allowed Hossain to be elected to the National Assembly of Pakistan from that seat. Hossain was considered one of Mujib's closest confidantes, along with Tajuddin Ahmad. Between January and March 1971, Hossain negotiated with Pakistan's Law Minister Alvin Robert Cornelius and the Pakistan Peoples Party's lawyer Abdul Hafeez Pirzada over the transfer of power.

== Bangladeshi political career ==
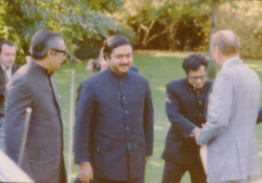
U.S. President Gerald Ford (right) speaks with Bangladeshi Foreign Minister Kamal Hossain (center) as Bangladeshi Prime Minister Sheikh Mujibur Rahman (left) looks on.

Hossain was imprisoned in West Pakistan's Central Prison Haripur during the 1971 Bangladesh War of Independence. He was released on 28 December 1971. After his release, he accompanied Sheikh Mujibur Rahman to London and New Delhi, followed by a triumphant homecoming in an independent Bangladesh on 10 January 1972.

Hossain was appointed the first law minister of the newly formed country. One of his chief responsibilities was to frame a constitution. He was chairman of the Constitution Drafting Committee in the Constituent Assembly of Bangladesh. He was 35 years of age at the time, making him one of the youngest constitution drafters in the world. Hossain was credited with leading the successful completion of the constitution's drafting process. The Constitution of Bangladesh was approved on 4 November 1972 and came into force on 16 December 1972. The constitution included a bill of rights and professed parliamentary government (scrapped in 1975 and restored in 1991).

However, the constitution also included references to socialism, including language such as "realise through the democratic process a socialist society". On socialism, Hossain said "socialism was very much within the democratic framework and not socialism in the sense of communism. That, again, I think, is something that in the context of our historical experience from the 1950s, 1960s, and 1970s was the big issue in those days". According to Hossain, the Awami League supported social democracy inspired by the politics of the British Labour Party. He recounted that socialism was an important political current in South Asia, especially during the 1960s and 1970s. For example, the Indian constitution also includes references to socialism. The government of post-1971 leader Zulfikar Ali Bhutto embarked on nationalization in Pakistan. The Dominion of Ceylon was proclaimed as the Democratic Socialist Republic of Sri Lanka in 1972.

Hossain served as a Member of Parliament from Dhaka in the Jatiyo Sangshad. He became the Foreign Minister of Bangladesh in 1973. Hossain secured Bangladesh's admission to the United Nations in 1974. The U.S. Secretary of State Henry Kissinger called Hossain "another student of mine".

Hossain was a signatory to the Delhi Agreement between India, Pakistan and Bangladesh. The agreement sought to normalize relations in the subcontinent after the 1971 conflict. In the agreement, Pakistan pledged to release interned Bengali families in exchange for the return of PoWs held by India and Bangladesh. On dealing with neighboring India, Hossain has said "I had a great equation with Mrs Indira Gandhi and her foreign minister Swaran Singh. We discussed the knotty issue of land boundary with so much ease".

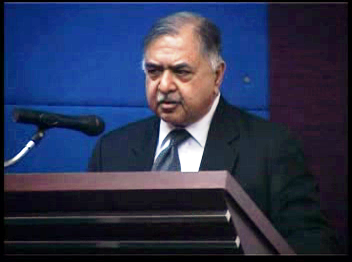
Hossain speaking at the University of Dhaka in 2011

Hossain was also appointed energy minister. The 1973 oil crisis began to push developing countries like Bangladesh to explore their own oil and gas reserves. There was speculation of large reserves in the Bay of Bengal. Hossain began to study the legal reforms needed for Bangladesh to launch a hydrocarbon industry. 40 foreign companies applied to explore the bay. Under Hossain's tenure in the ministry, Petrobangla was established. Hossain drafted the Bangladesh Petroleum Act after studying the laws of Malaysia and Indonesia. The new law replaced colonial laws and introduced the Production Sharing Contract for multinational energy firms in the country.

Hossain offered to resign on several occasions because of pressure due to the Awami League's lobbying activities. However, he continued to serve in Mujib's cabinet, even after the creation of the one party system of BAKSAL that lasted for 6 months between January and August 1975, until the assassination of Sheikh Mujibur Rahman on 15 August 1975. At the time of the Mujib's killing, Hossain was visiting Yugoslavia on a bilateral visit. He refused invitations to join the martial law government. Fearing for his life and rejecting calls to return, he moved to Oxford University for a period of teaching and research.

On BAKSAL, Hossain has said "Till 1971 I had not seen any differences between Mujib Bhai (the friend) and Bangabandhu (the leader). After 1972, he became the head of state. But, he never was both the head of the state and head of the party simultaneously. That change came later during the formation of BAKSAL. And that happened in a very complex situation. Through what dynamics he (Mujib) changed I cannot understand".

The next government, which assumed power after Mujib's killing, functioned as a junta for 3 years headed by a Chief Martial Law Administrator. In 1979, President Ziaur Rahman (who was army chief during the junta) restored multiparty politics, promoted free markets and pursued pro-Western, anti-Communist policies. The 1979 Bangladeshi general election restored the country's parliament. Hossain returned to Bangladesh in the late 1970s during this period of political liberalization.

In 1981, Hossain was instrumental in orchestrating Sheikh Hasina's return to Bangladesh from her exile in India (Hasina and Sheikh Rehana could not return to the country since their family's murder in 1975). He contested the 1981 Bangladeshi presidential election as the Awami League's candidate. He lost to then incumbent Justice Abdus Sattar, who had been acting president after the assassination of Ziaur Rahman. Within a year of the election, Sattar was deposed by the military during the 1982 Bangladesh coup d'état. At the time of President Hussain Muhammad Ershad's downfall in 1990, Hossain played a leading role in drawing up the Three-Alliance Roadmap for the restoration of parliamentary democracy after 15 years of presidential government. He was also involved in making the then chief justice Shahabuddin Ahmed the head of the transitional government.

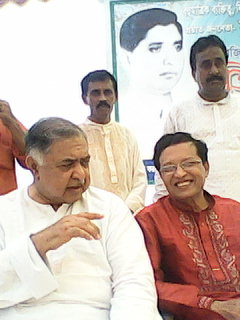
Hossain (left) with political activists

In 1992, differences between Hossain and Awami League president Sheikh Hasina caused him to leave the party. He set up a small political party called Gano Forum. In 1996, when the Awami League and Bangladesh Nationalist Party (BNP) were at loggerheads, Kamal Hossain and Syed Ishtiaq Ahmed devised a formula that culminated in the introduction of the system of caretaker governance for holding general elections. Similar caretaker governments headed by judges were later adopted in Pakistan, Greece and Bhutan.

In 2003, Hossain was the counsel for The Daily Star editor Mahfuz Anam and Prothom Alo editor Matiur Rahman in a defamation case filed by Salahuddin Quader Chowdhury. In 2006, when the caretaker system was threatened by Prime Minister Khaleda Zia's efforts to influence the election process, Kamal Hossain led the legal battle against the fraudulent voter list drawn up by the Zia government. Hossain also criticized extrajudicial killings by the Rapid Action Battalion under the Zia administration. Hossain has criticized human rights abuses under the second and third Hasina administrations. In 2011, he defended Nobel laureate Muhammad Yunus in court following Hasina's decision to sack Yunus from the board of Grameen Bank. In 2018, Hossain defended the photographer Shahidul Alam in court after Alam was detained on charges of criticizing Prime Minister Sheikh Hasina. Hossain has also supported the deposed chief justice Surendra Kumar Sinha who struck down a constitutional amendment allowing parliament to impeach supreme court judges.

In October 2018, Kamal Hossain announced a new alliance called Jatiya Oikya Front (National Unity Front), which received backing from the BNP. Hossain addressed political rallies in different Bangladeshi cities during October and November 2018. He addressed a rally in Sylhet on 24 October. In Chittagong on 27 October, he warned the Hasina government of legal consequences if the opposition's election demands were not met. At a rally in Suhrawardy Udyan in Dhaka on 6 November 2018, Hossain said "The state does not belong to any king or queen. It is the people who are the sole owners of the state and their ownership must be realized".

He secured a major breakthrough in Bangladeshi politics by requesting Prime Minister Sheikh Hasina to have a dialogue with the BNP. The US Ambassador to Bangladesh Marcia Bernicat lauded the dialogue initiative. The first round of talks took place on 1 November 2018 and the second round on 7 November 2018. Hossain also met with the Chief Election Commissioner, attended the Mawlid prayer in Bangabhaban and the military reception on Armed Forces Day.

The official campaign period began on 8 November 2018. Previous free and fair elections in Bangladesh were usually a festive affair. Despite the dialogue and assurances of a peaceful election atmosphere from Prime Minister Sheikh Hasina, the campaign period was marked by persecution of civil society, media and the opposition; and human rights abuses by security forces. Human Rights Watch noted that "widespread surveillance and a crackdown on speech, have contributed to a climate of fear extending from prominent voices in society to ordinary citizens." The Awami League's affiliated student and youth wings mobilized its members who were armed with bamboo poles to attack the opposition. Hossain's motorcade was attacked on 14 December 2018.

The 2018 Bangladeshi general election was held amid widespread allegations of vote rigging, ballot box stuffing and intimidation of opposition polling agents. Hossain said "There was an unprecedented vote robbery, which is a mockery of democracy. The government has exploited state machinery to suppress opposition and secure a stage-managed victory. We call upon the Election Commission to declare the election void and demand a fresh election under a non-partisan government". After the election commission refused demands for a new election, Hossain called the incoming government illegitimate. He said "We need a united movement of citizens, political parties and human rights organizations that are committed to the realization of human rights and the institutionalization of democracy in the country. I hope the international community will take note of the current situation in Bangladesh. And on the basis of the United Nations Charter and resolutions, it shouldn't recognize any government which doesn't have the consent of the people".

The United States (Bangladesh's largest foreign investor) and the European Union (Bangladesh's largest export market) issued statements concerning the credibility of the election. The EU statement stated that "The European Union expects the country to move forward towards democracy, respect of human rights and fundamental freedoms. We will continue to support the work in this context, in the interest of the people of Bangladesh. The relevant national authorities should now ensure a proper examination of allegations of irregularities and commit to full transparency in their resolution". The US State Department stated "We strongly encourage all parties to refrain from violence and request the Election Commission work constructively with all sides to address claims of irregularities. Bangladesh's impressive record of economic development and respect for democracy and human rights are mutually reinforcing, and we look forward to continue working with the ruling government and opposition towards advancing these interrelated goals".

== Notable legal cases ==
Between 1977 and 2001, Hossain served as an international consultant for the multinational law firm Clifford Chance. He was also President of the Supreme Court Bar Association (1990–1991), the professional association of law practitioners in the Supreme Court of Bangladesh.

=== Scimitar v Bangladesh ===
Kamal Hossain and Justice Badrul Haider Chowdhury led the Bangladeshi legal team during a lawsuit filed by Scimitar Exploration Ltd at the International Centre for Settlement of Investment Disputes (ICSID).

=== Chevron v Bangladesh ===
Kamal Hossain represented Petrobangla in a lawsuit filed by Chevron at the International Centre for Settlement of Investment Disputes. The court rejected Chevron's claims from Petrobangla amounting to US$240 million.

== Role in the international area ==
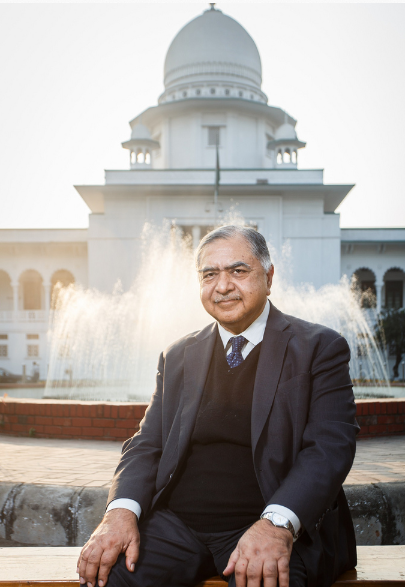
Hossain at the premises of Bangladesh's Supreme Court

Hossain is renowned worldwide as a jurist and enjoys a long-standing association with the United Nations. Between 1998 and 2003, he served as the UN Special Rapporteur on Afghanistan. He served two terms on the UN Compensation Commission in Geneva. In addition, he has appeared in several international arbitrations, both as a lawyer and an arbitrator. He was a member of the Iran-United States Claims Tribunal. He was Co-Chair of the United Nations Commission of Inquiry into Human Rights Violations in the Occupied Territories in 2001. He was Chairman of the Advisory Commission on Human Rights for the Commonwealth Secretariat. He was also a member of a human rights mission to Indonesia concerning the status of East Timor. During the 2006 United Nations Secretary-General selection, Hossain's name was floated as a possible candidate.

At the urging of the UN, Hossain advised China on energy-related legal reforms after the Asian giant began to liberalize its economy.

He is a member of the Panel of Arbitrators at ICSID and served as chair and member of a number of international arbitral tribunals (ICC, ICSID and UNCITRAL). He was appointed as a judge ad hoc by Malaysia for the International Tribunal for the Law of the Sea in the case Malaysia v Singapore (2003); he was a member of the International Law of the Sea Annex VII Tribunal in the same case, as well as in Guyana v Suriname (2005–2007).

He has also been vice chairman of the International Law Association in London, chairman of the South Asian Institute of Advanced Legal and Human Rights Studies (SAILS), and advisory council member for Transparency International. He has been an international election observer.

At the request of Commonwealth Secretary-General Emeka Anyaoku, Hossain visited Cameroon and The Gambia to assess the conditions of democracy, human rights and the rule of law. The Secretary-General entrusted a team including Hossain with assessing Cameroon's eligibility for Commonwealth membership. He also led Commonwealth missions on energy-related matters. He was part of the Commonwealth observer team during the 1994 South African general election. Hossain was a counsel to the governments of Trinidad and Tobago, Grenada, the Cayman Islands, Fiji and the Solomon Islands.

== Public perception ==
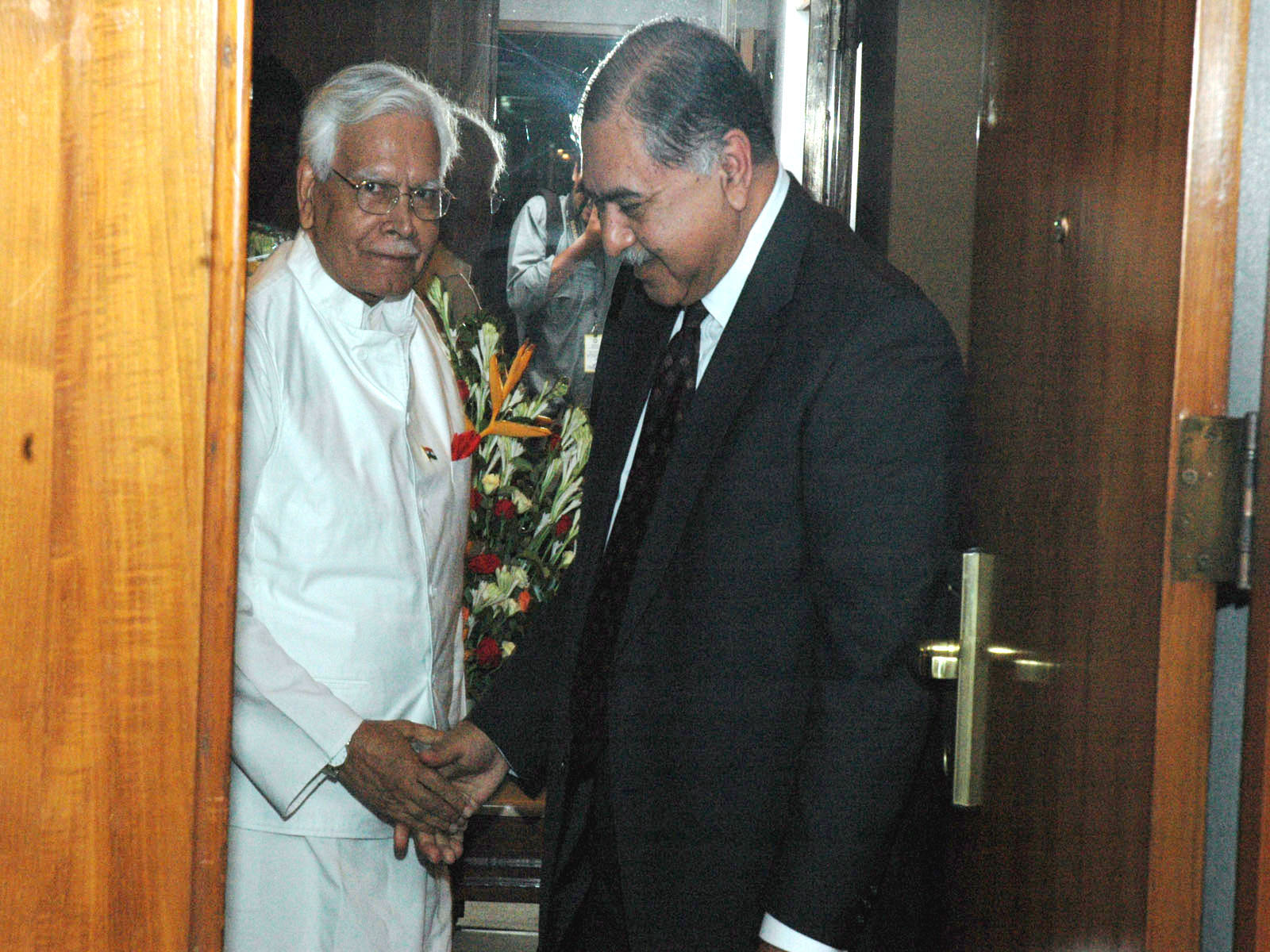
Hossain welcoming Indian foreign minister Natwar Singh in Dhaka, 2005

Hossain is the vanguard of liberal, secular politics in modern Bangladesh. He has been described as the "elder statesman" of Bangladesh, a "father figure" in the political arena; and the "conscience of the nation". An article in The Daily Star on the occasion of Hossain's 70th birthday states "If anything, in these past many years, he has in a way been transformed into an effective moral voice for the country. His opinions on the issues that matter, his presence on the national and global stage, all of these have reinforced our feeling that this man of the law also happens to be our point of reference on all other matters which exercise our imagination". In 1981, The New York Times reported that Western diplomats compared Hossain to the former US senator and presidential candidate Adlai Stevenson, who was reputed for his intellectual demeanor. In 2018, an article in The Diplomat magazine described Hossain as a "shrewd" back-channel player.

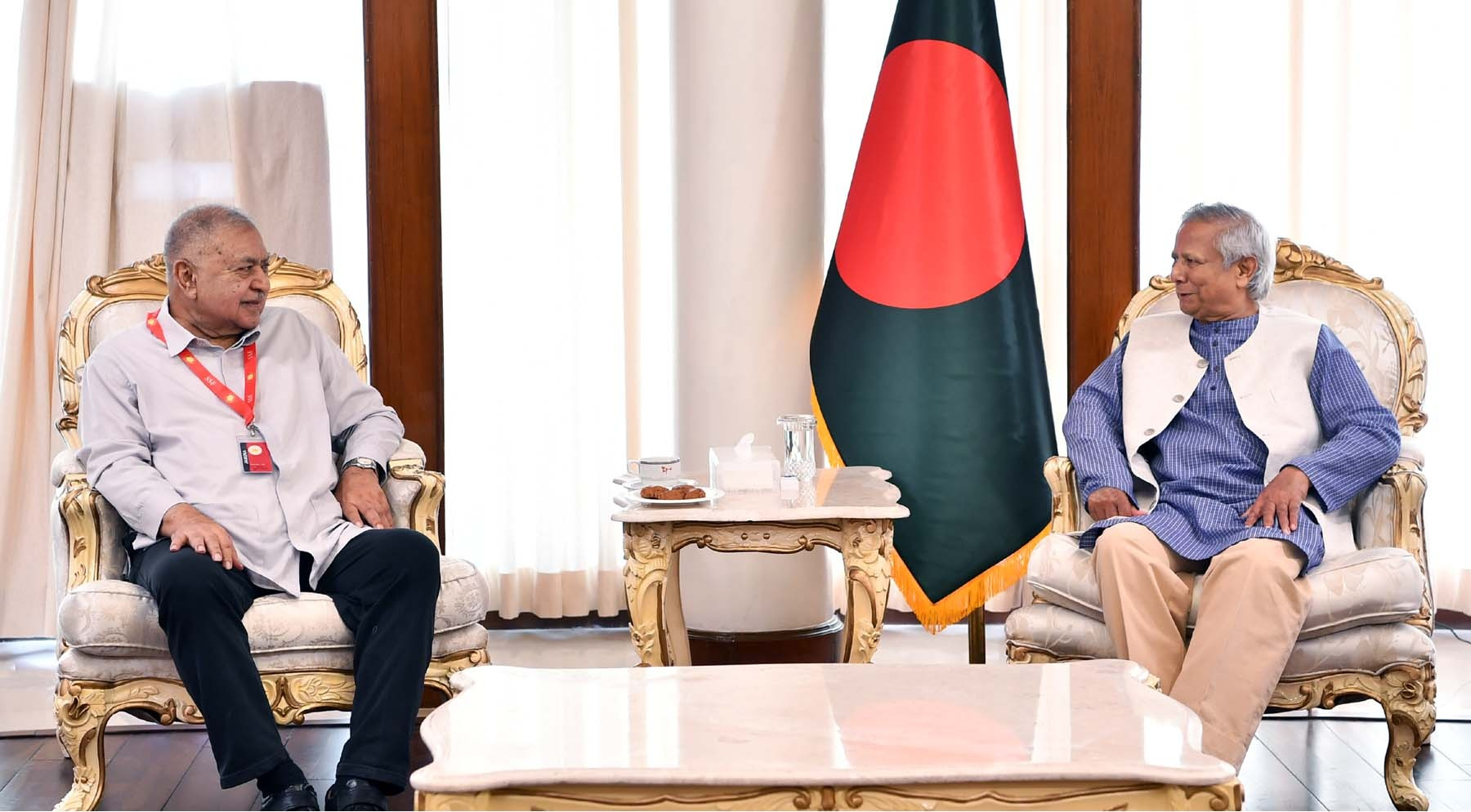
Hossain at a meeting with Muhammad Yunus, Chief Advisor of the interim Government of Bangladesh in 2024.

In regional neighbors India and Pakistan, Hossain is celebrated as a secular icon with impeccable credentials. Hossain delivered a speech at the Pakistan Institute of International Affairs in 2012, which was titled "Building a peaceful South Asia in response to the aspirations of all our peoples".

=== Political criticism ===
During the 2018 election campaign, Shah Ali Farhad, who works in the Awami League's Centre for Research and Information, wrote in the Bangla Tribune that Kamal Hossain was a "not so conscientious" politician. He criticized Hossain for holding the presidency of Gono Forum since its founding, arguing that the party had "no prospects of a new leadership in sight".

Arun Kumar Goswami, a political science professor at Jagannath University, criticized Hossain for not being a mass leader, stating "The politics Dr. Kamal Hossain wants to introduce would not work in Bangladesh. You cannot succeed in politics here without having connection with the people". Goswami was in turn refuted by Moudud Ahmed, who stated "I can refer a number of politicians who succeeded with lesser contact with people than that of Dr. Kamal Hossain".

In response to Hossain's demand for a caretaker government in 2018, Sheikh Hasina said such a provision was not included in Bangladesh's first constitution drafted by Hossain himself under her father's tenure. The BNP responded to this charge by pointing out that Hasina herself led the campaign for starting caretaker governance for elections in 1996. Former president A. Q. M. Badruddoza Chowdhury and his son Mahi B. Chowdhury initially supported Hossain as part of the National Unity Front, but later switched to support for the Awami League and began to criticize Hossain's political ambitions.

During a hearing in the Supreme Court in 2017, Hossain used an expletive against Attorney General Mahbubey Alam and was censured by chief justice Surendra Kumar Sinha.

During the election campaign period in December 2018, Hossain was asked about the underground relationship between the BNP and the Jamaat. Hossain told the reporter to "keep quiet" but later regretted his reaction after protests from two journalist trade unions. He later called the BNP-Jamaat relationship "stupid".

== Writings ==
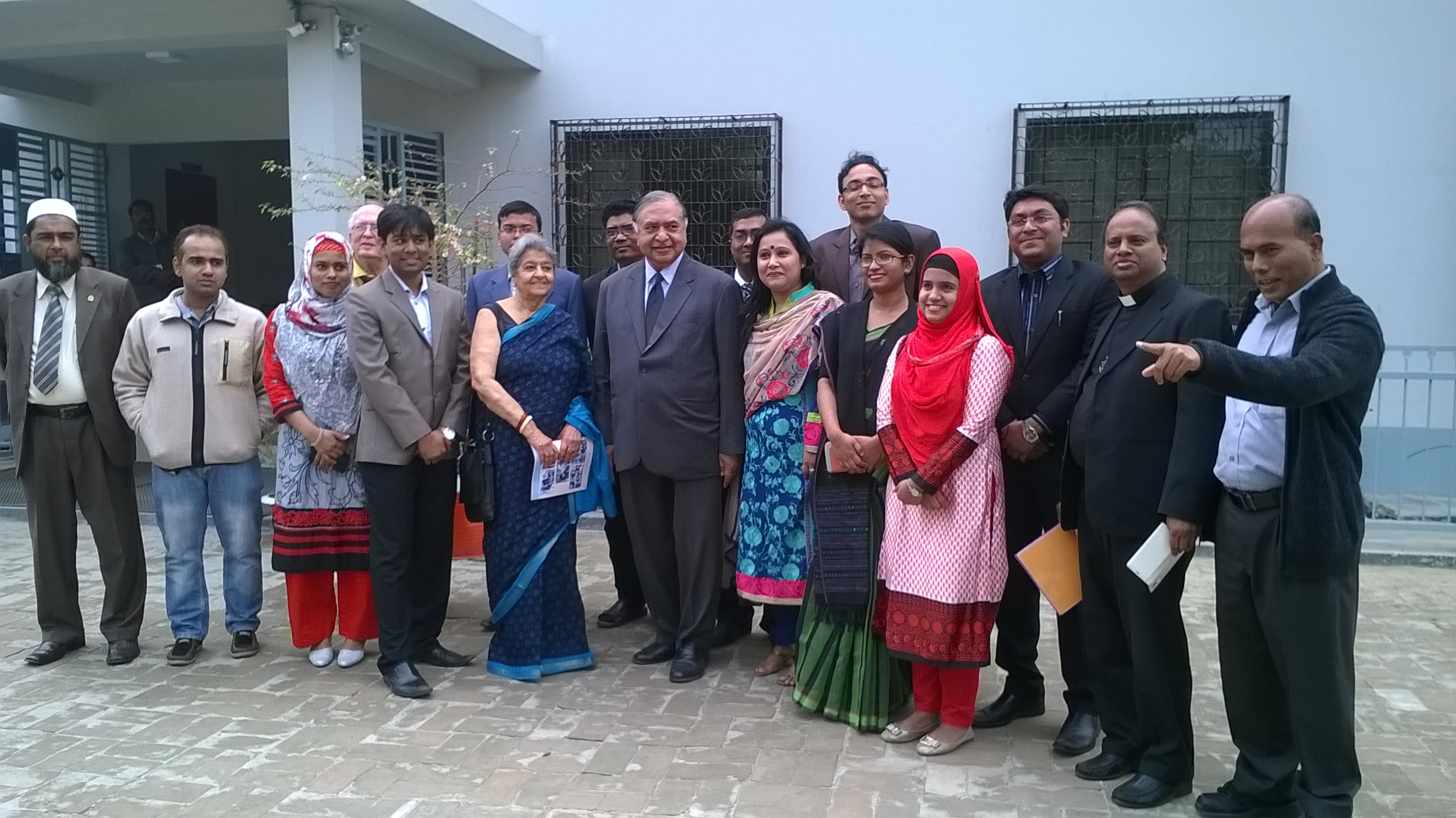
Kamal Hossain and his wife Hameeda Hossain (center) in 2015

Hossain published a work on petroleum law in 1979. The book was titled Law and policy in petroleum development: Changing relations between transnationals and governments. In 2013, Oxford University Press published Hossain's memoir, titled Bangladesh: Quest for Freedom and Justice. Hossain also authored a book in Bengali in 1994, titled Svāẏattaśāsana theke svādhīnatā (Civil government and independence).

== Academic ==
Hossain taught constitutional law and international law at Queen's College, Oxford (1957–1959). He was a research student (1958–1959, 1964) and research fellow (1977–1979) of Nuffield College, Oxford, and a visiting fellow (1976–1977) of All Souls College, Oxford. He taught international law and constitutional law in the University of Dhaka (1962–1967). He was a visiting professor at the Free University of Amsterdam (1997).

== Personal life ==
Hossain married Hameeda Hossain in 1963. He has two daughters, including the leading Bangladeshi civil rights lawyer Sara Hossain and the film maker Dina Hossain. His son-in-law (through Sara Hossain) is British journalist David Bergman.
