= Forum (Bangladesh) =

- Forum Editor: Kajalie Shehreen Islam
- Categories: Newsmagazine
- Frequency: Monthly
- Founded: 1969
- Final issue: April 2013
- Company: The Daily Star (owned by Mediastar)
- Country: Bangladesh
- Language: English
- Website: http://www.thedailystar.net

Forum was a Bangladeshi English-language monthly current affairs magazine. Founded in 1969 in the then East Pakistan, by human rights activist Hameeda Hossain and economist Rehman Sobhan, the magazine became renowned for its outspoken criticism against the West Pakistani establishment, and advocacy of democracy and economic reforms in the Pakistani union. During the political crisis and mass uprising in East Pakistan following the 1970 first democratic elections of Pakistan, Forum led the chorus of Bengali intellectuals expressing disillusionment with the Pakistani establishment and the inevitability of the breakup of Pakistan. The Pakistan Army shut down the magazine on 26 March 1971, during the early hours of Operation Searchlight.

In 2006, The Daily Star, Bangladesh's largest circulating English daily newspaper, began re-publishing the magazine on a monthly basis. Shah Hussain Imam served as the executive editor of the magazine. The editorial board consisted of original Forum founders Hameeda Hossain and Rehman Sobhan as well as Mahfuz Anam, editor and publisher of The Daily Star, Matiur Rahman, editor and publisher of Prothom Alo, and Anisuzzaman, a professor of Bengali at the University of Dhaka. In April 2013 the Forum published its last issue.

The magazine attracted columnists and contributors from across South Asia, such as Amartya Sen, Tariq Ali, Kuldip Nayar and Ahmed Rashid.
