= War Crimes File =

1995 documentary film

War Crimes File is a 1995 documentary directly by David Burgman. The documentary exposes some of the war criminals during the Bangladesh War of Independence who were living in London at the time. The perpetrators include Chowdhury Mueen-Uddin, Lutfur Rahman and Abu Sayeed. The documentary was aired on British TV Channel 4 about the 1971 Bangladesh atrocities. The film was produced by Gita Sahgal, director of this film was Howard Bradburn, made with the assistance of Bangladeshi filmmaker Tareque Masud, and created for Twenty Twenty. The program received a special commendation in the "Best International Current Affairs Award" category from the Royal Television Society in 1995, which was for its "courageous exposé of Islamic extremists now living in Britain". The film was subjected to a libel charge by the men featured in the film.

== Sylhet massacre ==
Faizul Haque, a practicing physician spoke about two war criminals Lutfor Rahman and Abu Sayeed. They organized meetings on behalf of Jamaat-e-Islami near Kanaighat Bazar. A local witness Moshaid Ali was present in the procession. Ali confirmed that this meeting introduced an Fatwa describing pro-independence supporters as Kafirs and announced anyone attempting to kill them as servants of Islam. Right after the procession, 500 hundred people were assassinated in Sylhet. Immediately after Fatwa, Faizul Haq and his nephew were also picked up and tortured for hours, as they were known for supporting the independence movement.

After the Fatwa, Lutfor Rahman, along with Manzur Hafiz and Shamsul Haque went to Charkhai High School and prepared a list of Awami League leaders and fighters targeting to burn their houses. The meeting was attended by around 1,000 witnesses. The next day, they started executing from their list and one of the individuals in the list was Yasmir Dafadar. Dafadar used to be an Islamic preacher and his family was a strong Awami League supporter. Tarafder chanted "Joy Bangla", a popular slogan for the independence activists before his death. He was beaten and drowned to death at a nearby pond in his house by Rahman, Hafiz and Haque. His house was also looted and his wife was overthrown from it.

Later, Lutfor Rahman moved to Birmingham
