= Bangladesh Legal Aid and Services Trust =

Legal Aid Organization in Bangladesh

- Formation: 1993
- Headquarters: Dhaka, Bangladesh
- Region served: Bangladesh
- Official language: Bengali
- Website: www.blast.org.bd

The Bangladesh Legal Aid and Services Trust (Bengali: বাংলাদেশ লিগ্যাল এইড এ্যান্ড সার্ভিসেস ট্রাস্ট) is one of the largest legal aid organizations in Bangladesh. The trust provides legal aid, a mediation center, legal advocacy, and files public interest legislation. The organization's headquarters is in Dhaka with 19 field offices. Sara Hossain is the executive director of the trust.

== History ==
The Bangladesh Legal Aid and Services Trust was established in 1993 following a conference of the Bangladesh Bar Council in 1992.

In 2003, the Bangladesh Legal Aid and Services Trust filed a petition challenging the constitutionality of the Gram Sarker Act, which was scrapped by the caretaker government in 2008.

In 2011, Ain o Salish Kendra and the Bangladesh Legal Aid and Services Trust were able to successfully petition the courts to ban corporal punishment in educational institutions in Bangladesh.

The Bangladesh Legal Aid and Services Trust filed a public interest legislation along with Naripokkho, Manusher Jonno Foundation, and BRAC Human Rights and Legal Aid Services challenging the legality and constitutionality of Bangladeshi law only identifying women as rape victims.

In April 2022, the Canadian High Commission in Dhaka requested the Bangladesh Legal Aid and Services Trust and Ain o Salish Kendra to provide legal aid to a 19-year-old Canadian woman who was being prevented from leaving Bangladesh by her family. Sara Hossain and ZI Khan Panna moved a petition on behalf of the two organizations to the High Court Division, which ordered the woman to stay with her parents while ordering the parents to return her communication devices during the trial period.

The Bangladesh Legal Aid and Services Trust called for the release of a school teacher who had been arrested for hurting religious sentiments after saying science was based on evidence while religion was based on faith. Ain O Salish Kendra, the Bangladesh Legal Aid and Services Trust, and Nari Pakkho filed a petition challenging the use of character evidence to discredit the victim in rape cases. The Bangladesh Legal Aid and Services Trust, along with the law department of the University of Dhaka and the Death Penalty Project, found 72 percent of those sentenced to death in Bangladesh were poor.

== Board of Trustees ==
- Kamal Hossain (chairman)
- Shamsul Bari (vice-chairman)
- Justice A. F. M. Abdur Rahman
- Rabia Bhuiyan
- Fazlul Huq
- ZI Khan Panna
- A Matin Chowdhury
- Tahmina Rahman
