= Sara Hossain =

Bangladeshi lawyer

- সারা হোসেন
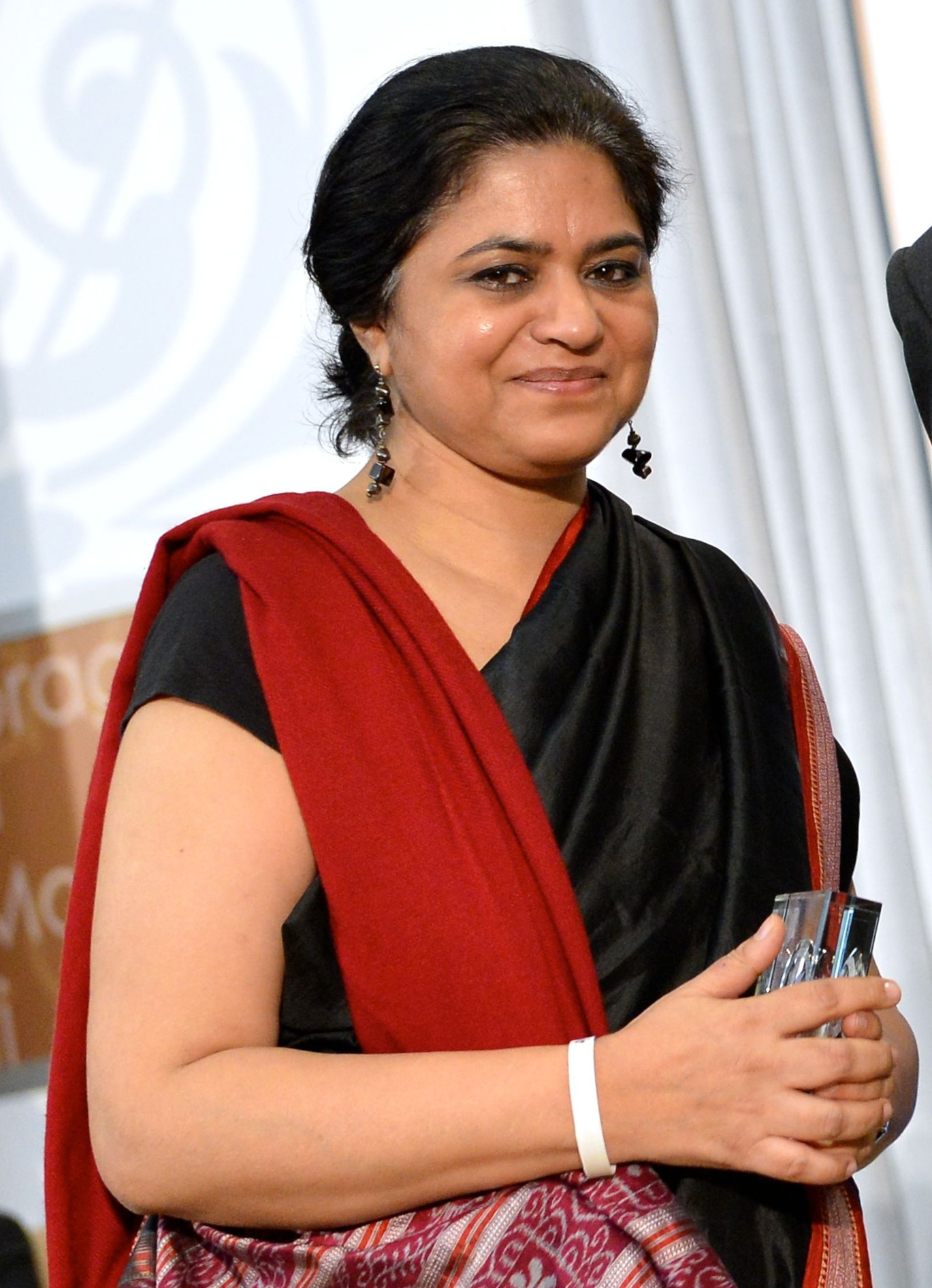
- Hossain in 2016
- Education: University of Oxford (BA, MA); SOAS, University of London
- Occupation: Lawyer
- Spouse: David Bergman
- Parents: Kamal Hossain (father); Hameeda Hossain (mother)

Sara Hossain is a Bangladeshi lawyer. She is a barrister in the Supreme Court of Bangladesh. She is the honorary executive director of the Bangladesh Legal Aid and Services Trust (BLAST), a major legal aid provider. She has been at the forefront of advocating for women's rights in Bangladeshi courts and played a key role in drafting legal reforms to protect women. She was the amicus curiae in the landmark case of Bangladesh National Women Lawyers Association (BNWLW) v. Bangladesh, in which the Supreme Court supported the judicial practice of referring to international human rights law in the absence of domestic legislation. She is known for her role in challenging fatwa violence when a fatwa is issued to mete out punishment to women and girls. She co-edited 'Honour': Crimes, Paradigms and Violence Against Women with Lynn Welchman.

Hossain was awarded the International Women of Courage Award in 2016 by the United States Secretary of State.

== Early life and family ==
Sara Hossain is the eldest daughter of the statesman Kamal Hossain and the human rights advocate Hameeda Hossain. Her father's family is part of a Bengali Muslim zamindar family of Shayestabad in Barisal which claims descent from Ali, the fourth Caliph of Islam. Her mother's family is from Sindh, Pakistan.

== Education and work ==
Hossain completed her Bachelor of Art and Master of Arts in Law (jurisprudence) from Wadham College, Oxford in 1988. She was then called to the Bar at Middle Temple. She enrolled in the High Court Division of the Supreme Court of Bangladesh in 1992 and went on to Appellate Division in 2008. Hossain also worked as a Legal Officer with INTERIGHTS for the South Asia division from 1997 to 2003. She was involved in supporting human rights litigation before national and international courts including the European Court of Human Rights and the Inter-American Commission on Human Rights and the Human Rights Committee on the use of international and comparative human rights law. She also worked on a multi-country study on honour crimes with the Centre for Islamic and Middle Eastern Law at SOAS. Currently, Hossain is a partner in the law firm Dr. Kamal Hossain and Associates.

In July 2018, the United Nations Human Rights Council appointed Hossain to co-chair (alongside David Crane and Kaari Betty Murungi) a three-person Commission of Inquiry into the killing of at least 140 Palestinians by the Israeli army. In 2022, she was appointed as the chair of the UN fact finding mission on violence against women during the 2021–2022 Iranian protests.

== Organisations ==
Apart from BLAST, Hossain is a member of the Executive Committee of the Dhaka-based human rights organisation Ain o Salish Kendra. Formerly, she was a board member of the South Asia Women's Fund (SAWF). Hossain has also served as a Commissioner of the International Commission of Jurists (ICJ). She is currently a member of the Human Rights Committee of the International Law Association (ILA) and the Advisory Committee of the Women's International Coalition on Gender Justice (WICG), Hossain is a well-known figure in the international human rights arena.

== Awards and achievements ==
In 2016, Hossain was awarded the International Women of Courage Award by US Secretary of State, John Kerry for "empowering women and girls and for giving voice to the voiceless in Bangladesh through your relentless legal advocacy." Hossain was also named "Young Global Leader" by the World Economic Forum in 2008 and as "Asia 21 Fellow" by Asia Society, New York, USA in 2007. She received the Anannya Top Ten Awards in 2005 as well as the Human Rights Lawyer Award by The Lawyers Committee for Human Rights (now Human Rights First).

== Personal life ==
Sara is married to British human rights activist David Bergman who is an investigative journalist known for his reportage on war crimes committed during the Bangladesh Liberation War.

== Publications ==
=== Books and reports ===
- Handbook on Legal Remedies for Forced Marriage (2014)
- Bangladesh UPR Forum’s Submission to the Human Rights Council (2009)
- Human Rights in Bangladesh (2006-08)
- Hossain, Sara; Welchman, Lynn, eds. (2005). 'Honour': Crimes, Paradigms and Violence Against Women. Zed Books. ISBN 978-1-84277-627-8.
- Rights in Search of Remedies: Public Interest Litigation in South Asia with Shahdeen Malik and Bushra Musa (1996)

The Chittagong Hill Tracts, Bangladesh: On the Difficult Road to Peace (2003)

=== Articles ===
- ‘Wayward Girls and Well Wisher Parents: Habeas Corpus, Women’s Rights and the Bangladesh Courts’, in Forced Marriage (2010)
- ‘Confronting Constitutional Curtailments: Attempts to Rebuild Independence of the Judiciary in Bangladesh’ in Handbook of Politics in South Asia (2010)
- ‘South Asia’ with Iain Byrne in Social Rights Jurisprudence: Emerging Trends in International and Comparative Law (2008)
- 'The Right to Marry' in Men’s Laws, Women’s Lives (2005)
- 'Apostates, Ahmadis and Advocates : Uses and Abuses of Offences against Religion' in Warning Signs of Fundamentalism (2004-5)
- 'Abduction and Forced Marriage: Rights and Remedies in Bangladesh and Pakistan' with Suzanne E. Turner, in International Family Law (2001)
- 'Women's Reproductive Rights and the Politics of Fundamentalism: A View From Bangladesh' with Sajeda Amin, American University Law Review (1995)
- 'Equality and Personal Laws in South Asia' in Human Rights of Women: National and International Perspectives (1994)
