= Srilatha Batliwala =

Indian social activist and scholar

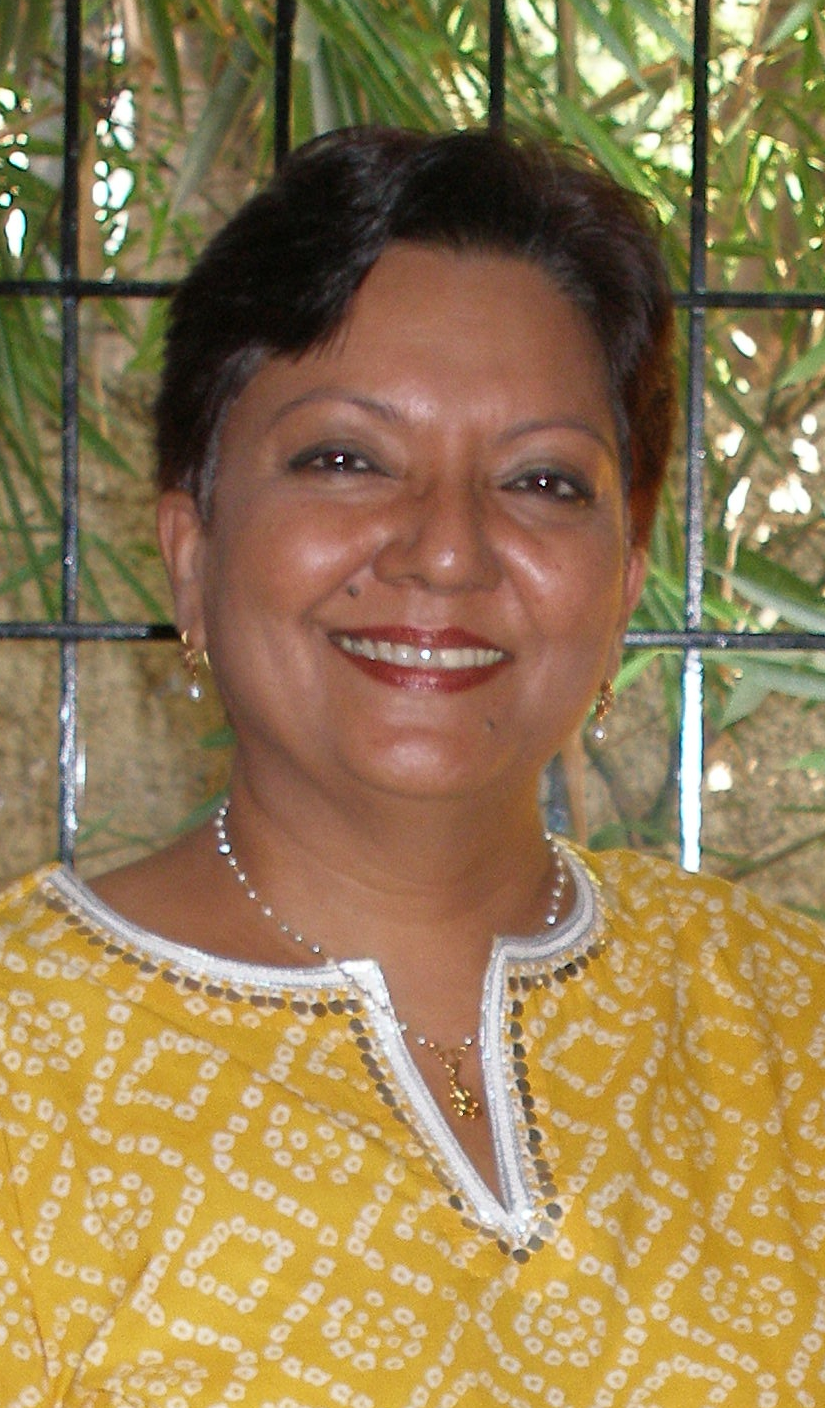
- Batliwala in 2011
- Born: Bangalore, India
- Occupations: Social activism related to women's empowerment and author
- Years active: Since 1960s
- Known for: Women's empowerment
- Notable work: Women’s Empowerment in South Asia – Concepts and Practices (1993)

Srilatha Batliwala, a social activist, advocate of women's rights, scholar, and author of many books on empowerment of women is from Bengaluru (earlier known as Bangalore), Karnataka, India. From the later part of the 1970s she has been engaged in linking "grassroots activism, advocacy, teaching, research, training," obtaining grants, and works of scholarly nature.

Empowerment of women came to defined in the middle of 1980s, which according to Baltiwala is a terminology which signified "welfare, upliftment, community participation, and poverty alleviation."

According to Baltiwala the empowerment laws related to women are easily passed in India but its implementation is tardy, and comparable to a similar situation in Egypt. She is also of the opinion that the "adverse reaction to organising and mobilizing" women's movements is on the rise compared to earlier times.

== Biography ==
Batliwala was born in Bengaluru, India. She graduated from the Tata Institute of Social Sciences, Bombay with a Master of Arts (MA) degree in Social Work. From the late 1970 to late 1990s she worked in India promoting feminist movement, build leadership qualities in women, monitor and assess gender-sensitive issues, and create a pool of women activists. She was instrumental in establishing four institutions and two grassroot level feminist campaigns. From middle of 1990s she has worked outside Bengaluru in many international institutions; as a Program Officer with the Ford Foundation (1997–2000), New York City; Civil Society Research Fellow at the Hauser Center for Nonprofit Organizations on "transnational civil society, particularly on transnational grassroots movements"; in Harvard University; and chair of the Board of the Women's Environment and Development Organization, New York City.

Batliwala is actively involved in many organizations dealing with women's rights such as a Scholar Associate with the Association for Women's Rights in Development (AWID), Co-chair of the board of "Gender at Work" (a global network of women), and member of the board of "Samudaya Nirman Sahayak" and SPARC in Mumbai which was founded in 1984 to facilitate urban poor to take part in development works of the community. She also did research at the National Institute of Advanced Studies of the Indian Institute of Science in Bengaluru. on the status of women in Karnataka. Her empowerment actions have benefited poor and Dalit women in both rural and urban areas. This action is notable in facilitating election of poor and uneducated women of villages into the local self-government bodies under the Panchayati Raj; their representation was much above the prescribed limit of 33% reservation for women, in several districts.

Batliwala was a Fellow, Women's Policy Research, and Advocacy, National Institute of Advanced Studies, Bengaluru. She is currently Senior Advisor, Knowledge Building, CREA (Creating Resources for Empowerment in Action). She is the President of the NGO IT for Change.

The goals of women's empowerment according to Batliwala are "to challenge patriarchal ideology, transform the structures that reinforce and perpetuate gender discrimination and social inequality, and enable women to gain access and control over, both material and information resources."

== Publications ==
Batliwala has many publications to her credit on women's empowerment and development issues and her best known book Women’s Empowerment in South Asia – Concepts and Practices, (1993), which has been published in more than 20 languages, is a "conceptual framework and manual" which is widely used as a training manual for empowerment of women. Her other important publications are: Status of Rural Women in Karnataka (1998) on gender equations; Transnational Civil Society: An Introduction with Lloyd David Brown (2006); Grassroots Movements as Global Actors; and Feminist Leadership for Social Transformation: Clearing the Conceptual Cloud (2011).

== Bibliography ==
- Batliwala, Srilatha; Brown, Lloyd David (2006). Transnational civil society: an introduction. Kumarian Press. ISBN 978-1-56549-210-3.
- Batliwala, Srilatha (2011). Feminist Leadership for Social Transformation: Clearing the Conceptual Cloud.
- Hill, Elizabeth (2 July 2010). Worker Identity, Agency and Economic Development: Women's Empowerment in the Indian Informal Economy. Routledge. ISBN 978-1-136-95428-3.
- Philips, Rosemarie (1995). Energy as an Instrument for Socio-economic Development. United Nations Development Programm.
- Sahay, Sushama (1 January 1998). Women and Empowerment: Approaches and Strategies. Discovery Publishing House. ISBN 978-81-7141-412-3.
