= List of people on coins =

This is a list of people depicted on coins in present and past circulation throughout the world, listed in two sections – coins in current circulation and coins no longer in circulation. Note that this list does not include people who have only appeared on banknotes, and is of actual people and not deities or fictional persons. The customary design on coins is a portrait of a notable individual (living and/or deceased) on the obverse or reverse, unless the subject is depicted on both sides of the coin.

Elizabeth II, former Queen of the Commonwealth realms and their territories and dependencies, features on more coins than any other person.

== Coins in circulation ==
=== Albania ===
Currency: Lek (since 1926)
Subdivision: Qindarkë (1/100)
Currency code: ALL
See also Albanian lek.

Person	Years of birth and death	Reason for honor	Denomination	Obverse or reverse	In circulation since
Gentius	unknown	Last King of Illyria (180 BC-168 BC)	50 lekë	obverse	1996
Teuta	unknown	Queen and Regent of Illyria (230 BC-228 BC)	100 lekë	obverse	2000

=== Aruba ===
Currency: Florin (since 1986)
Symbol: ƒ
Subdivision: Cent (1/100)
Currency code: AWG
See also Aruban florin.

Person	Years of birth and death	Reason for honor	Denomination	Obverse or reverse	In circulation since
Beatrix	1938–	Queen of the Netherlands (1980–2013)	1ƒ	obverse	1986
Beatrix	1938–	Queen of the Netherlands (1980–2013)	21/2ƒ	obverse	1986
Beatrix	1938–	Queen of the Netherlands (1980–2013)	5ƒ	obverse	1986
Willem-Alexander	1967–	King of the Netherlands (2013–)	1ƒ	obverse	2014
Willem-Alexander	1967–	King of the Netherlands (2013–)	21/2ƒ	obverse	2014
Willem-Alexander	1967–	King of the Netherlands (2013–)	5ƒ	obverse	2014

=== Australia ===
Currency: Dollar (since 1966)
Symbol: $
Subdivision: Cent (1/100)
Symbol: ¢
Currency code: AUD
See also Australian dollar and coins of the Australian dollar.

Person	Years of birth and death	Reason for honor	Denomination	Obverse or reverse	In circulation since
Elizabeth II	1926–2022	Queen of Australia (1952–2022)	5c	obverse	1966
Elizabeth II	1926–2022	Queen of Australia (1952–2022)	10c	obverse	1966
Elizabeth II	1926–2022	Queen of Australia (1952–2022)	20c	obverse	1966
Elizabeth II	1926–2022	Queen of Australia (1952–2022)	50c	obverse	1969
Elizabeth II	1926–2022	Queen of Australia (1952–2022)	$1	obverse	1984
Elizabeth II	1926–2022	Queen of Australia (1952–2022)	$2	obverse	1988
The Duchess of Cambridge (née Catherine Middleton)	1982–	Duchess of Cambridge (2011–2022); Princess of Wales (2022–)	20c	reverse	2011
Prince William, Duke of Cambridge	1982–	Duke of Cambridge (2011–2022); Prince of Wales (2022–)	20c	reverse	2011

=== Bahamas, the ===
Currency: Dollar (since 1966)
Symbol: $
Subdivision: Cent (1/100)
Currency code: BSD
See also Bahamian dollar.

Person	Years of birth and death	Reason for honor	Denomination	Obverse or reverse	In circulation since
Elizabeth II	1926–2022	Queen of the United Kingdom (1952–2022) and Queen of the Bahamas (1973–2022)	1 cent	obverse	1966
Elizabeth II	1926–2022	Queen of the United Kingdom (1952–2022) and Queen of the Bahamas (1973–2022)	5 cents	obverse	1966
Elizabeth II	1926–2022	Queen of the United Kingdom (1952–2022) and Queen of the Bahamas (1973–2022)	10 cents	obverse	1966
Elizabeth II	1926–2022	Queen of the United Kingdom (1952–2022) and Queen of the Bahamas (1973–2022)	15 cents	obverse	1966
Elizabeth II	1926–2022	Queen of the United Kingdom (1952–2022) and Queen of the Bahamas (1973–2022)	25 cents	obverse	1966
Elizabeth II	1926–2022	Queen of the United Kingdom (1952–2022) and Queen of the Bahamas (1973–2022)	50 cents	obverse	1966
Elizabeth II	1926–2022	Queen of the United Kingdom (1952–2022) and Queen of the Bahamas (1973–2022)	1 dollar	obverse	1966
Elizabeth II	1926–2022	Queen of the United Kingdom (1952–2022) and Queen of the Bahamas (1973–2022)	2 dollars	obverse	1966
Elizabeth II	1926–2022	Queen of the United Kingdom (1952–2022) and Queen of the Bahamas (1973–2022)	5 dollars	obverse	1966

=== Bangladesh ===
Currency: Taka (since 1972)
Symbol: ৳
Subdivision: Poysha (1/100)
Currency code: BDT
See also Bangladeshi taka.

Person	Years of birth and death	Reason for honor	Denomination	Obverse or reverse	In circulation since
Sheikh Mujibur Rahman	1920–1975	1st President of Bangladesh (1971–1972); 2nd Prime Minister of Bangladesh (1972–1975); 4th President of Bangladesh (January 25, 1975 – August 15, 1975)	৳1	obverse	2010
Sheikh Mujibur Rahman	1920–1975	1st President of Bangladesh (1971–1972); 2nd Prime Minister of Bangladesh (1972–1975); 4th President of Bangladesh (January 25, 1975 – August 15, 1975)	৳2	obverse	2010
Sheikh Mujibur Rahman	1920–1975	1st President of Bangladesh (1971–1972); 2nd Prime Minister of Bangladesh (1972–1975); 4th President of Bangladesh (January 25, 1975 – August 15, 1975)	৳5	obverse	2012

=== Belize ===
Currency: Dollar (since 1885)
Symbol: $
Subdivision: Cent (1/100)
Currency code: BZD
See also Belize dollar and coins of the Belize dollar.

Person	Years of birth and death	Reason for honor	Denomination	Obverse or reverse	In circulation since
Elizabeth II	1926–2022	Queen of Belize (1952–2022)	1 cent	obverse	1981
Elizabeth II	1926–2022	Queen of Belize (1952–2022)	5 cents	obverse	1981
Elizabeth II	1926–2022	Queen of Belize (1952–2022)	10 cents	obverse	1981
Elizabeth II	1926–2022	Queen of Belize (1952–2022)	25 cents	obverse	1981
Elizabeth II	1926–2022	Queen of Belize (1952–2022)	50 cents	obverse	1981
Elizabeth II	1926–2022	Queen of Belize (1952–2022)	$1	obverse	1990

=== Bermuda ===
Currency: Dollar (since 1970)
Symbol: $
Subdivision: Cent (1/100)
Currency code: BMD
See also Bermudian dollar.

Person	Years of birth and death	Reason for honor	Denomination	Obverse or reverse	In circulation since
Elizabeth II	1926–2022	Queen of the United Kingdom (1952–2022)	1 cent	obverse	1970
Elizabeth II	1926–2022	Queen of the United Kingdom (1952–2022)	5 cents	obverse	1970
Elizabeth II	1926–2022	Queen of the United Kingdom (1952–2022)	10 cents	obverse	1970
Elizabeth II	1926–2022	Queen of the United Kingdom (1952–2022)	25 cents	obverse	1970
Elizabeth II	1926–2022	Queen of the United Kingdom (1952–2022)	$1	obverse	1970

=== Brazil ===
Currency: Real (since 1994)
Symbol: R$
Subdivision: Centavo (1/100)
Currency code: BRL
See also Brazilian real.

Person	Years of birth and death	Reason for honor	Denomination	Obverse or reverse	In circulation since
Pedro Álvares Cabral	1467–1520	Explorer and navigator; discovered the sea route to Brazil (1500)	R$0.01	obverse	1998
Tiradentes	1746–1792	Revolutionary (1792)	R$0.05	obverse	1998
Pedro I of Brazil	1798–1834	Emperor of Brazil. Liberator of Brazil from Portugal (1821)	R$0.10	obverse	1998
Manuel Deodoro da Fonseca	1827–1892	First President of Brazil (1889)	R$0.25	obverse	1998
José Paranhos, Baron of Rio Branco	1845–1912	Diplomat, consolidator of Brazilian borders (1902)	R$0.50	obverse	1998

=== Brunei ===
Currency: Dollar (since 1967)
Symbol: $
Subdivision: Sen (1/100)
Currency code: BND
See also Brunei dollar and coins of the Brunei dollar.

Person	Years of birth and death	Reason for honor	Denomination	Obverse or reverse	In circulation since
Hassanal Bolkiah	1946–	29th Sultan of Brunei (1967–)	1 sen	obverse	1996
Hassanal Bolkiah	1946–	29th Sultan of Brunei (1967–)	5 sen	obverse	1996
Hassanal Bolkiah	1946–	29th Sultan of Brunei (1967–)	10 sen	obverse	1996
Hassanal Bolkiah	1946–	29th Sultan of Brunei (1967–)	20 sen	obverse	1996
Hassanal Bolkiah	1946–	29th Sultan of Brunei (1967–)	50 sen	obverse	1996

=== Bulgaria ===
Currency: Lev (plu. leva) (since 1881)
Symbol: лв.
Subdivision: Stotinka (1/100)
Currency code: BGN
See also Bulgarian lev.

Person	Years of birth and death	Reason for honor	Denomination	Obverse or reverse	In circulation since
Ivan Rilski	876-c. 946	Saint of the Bulgarian Orthodox Church	1 lev	reverse	2002
Paisius of Hilendar	1722-c. 1773	Key Bulgarian National Revival figure	2 leva	reverse	2015

=== Canada ===
Currency: Dollar (since 1858)
Symbol: $
Subdivision: Cent (1/100)
Symbol: ¢
Currency code: CAD
See also Canadian dollar, coins of the Canadian dollar, and list of people on coins of Canada

Person	Years of birth and death	Reason for honor	Denomination	Obverse or reverse	In circulation since
Elizabeth II	1926–2022	Queen of Canada (1952–2022)	1¢	obverse	1953
Elizabeth II	1926–2022	Queen of Canada (1952–2022)	5¢	obverse	1953
Elizabeth II	1926–2022	Queen of Canada (1952–2022)	10¢	obverse	1953
Elizabeth II	1926–2022	Queen of Canada (1952–2022)	25¢	obverse	1953
Elizabeth II	1926–2022	Queen of Canada (1952–2022)	50¢	obverse	1953
Elizabeth II	1926–2022	Queen of Canada (1952–2022)	$1	obverse	1987
Elizabeth II	1926–2022	Queen of Canada (1952–2022)	$2	obverse	1996
Charles III	1948–	King of Canada (2023–)	5¢	obverse	2023
Charles III	1948–	King of Canada (2023–)	10¢	obverse	2023
Charles III	1948–	King of Canada (2023–)	25¢	obverse	2023
Charles III	1948–	King of Canada (2023–)	50¢	obverse	2023
Charles III	1948–	King of Canada (2023–)	$1	obverse	2023
Charles III	1948–	King of Canada (2023–)	$2	obverse	2023
Terry Fox	1958–1981	Cancer treatment activist; ran the Marathon of Hope on a prosthetic leg	$1	reverse	2005 (circulating commemorative coin)
Cindy Klassen	1979–	Won 6 Olympic medals in speed skating	25¢	reverse	2009 (circulating commemorative coin)
Sir Isaac Brock	1769–1812	Died at the Battle of Queenston Heights; remembered as the Hero of Upper Canada	25¢	reverse	2012 (circulating commemorative coin)
Tecumseh	c. 1768–1813	United native allies to fight at the Battle of Fort Detroit	25¢	reverse	2012 (circulating commemorative coin)
Charles de Salaberry	1778–1829	Prevented American advance on Montreal twice	25¢	reverse	2012 (circulating commemorative coin)
Laura Secord	1775–1868	Walked 30 km to warn British troops of impending American attack	25¢	reverse	2012 (circulating commemorative coin)
Sir John A. Macdonald	1815–1891	First prime minister of Canada	$2	reverse	2015 (circulating commemorative coin)
Lieutenant-Colonel John McCrae	1872–1918	Wrote the poem "In Flanders Fields"	$2	reverse	2015 (circulating commemorative coin)
Oscar Peterson	1925–2007	Canadian piano virtuoso and jazz legend; influenced Canadian music and culture	$1	reverse	2022 (circulating commemorative coin)
Alexander Graham Bell	1847–1922	Completed the first powered aircraft flight in Canada with the Silver Dart; set a new marine speed world record with the HD-4 Hydrofoil	$1	reverse	2022 (circulating commemorative coin)
Elsie MacGill	1905–1980	Aeronautical engineer and women's rights advocate	$1	reverse	2023 (circulating commemorative coin)

=== Cayman Islands ===
Currency: Dollar (since 1972)
Symbol: $
Subdivision: Cent (1/100)
Currency code: KYD
See also Cayman Islands dollar.

Person	Years of birth and death	Reason for honor	Denomination	Obverse or reverse	In circulation since
Elizabeth II	1926–2022	Queen of the United Kingdom (1952–2022)	1 cent	obverse	1972
Elizabeth II	1926–2022	Queen of the United Kingdom (1952–2022)	5 cents	obverse	1972
Elizabeth II	1926–2022	Queen of the United Kingdom (1952–2022)	10 cents	obverse	1972
Elizabeth II	1926–2022	Queen of the United Kingdom (1952–2022)	25 cents	obverse	1972

=== Chile ===
Currency: Peso (since 1975)
Symbol: $
Subdivision: Centavo (1/100)
Currency code: CLP
See also Chilean peso.

Person	Years of birth and death	Reason for honor	Denomination	Obverse or reverse	In circulation since
Bernardo O'Higgins	1778–1842	Independence leader who freed Chile from Spanish rule in the Chilean War of Independence	1 peso	obverse	1975
Bernardo O'Higgins	1778–1842	Independence leader who freed Chile from Spanish rule in the Chilean War of Independence	5 pesos	obverse	1990
Bernardo O'Higgins	1778–1842	Independence leader who freed Chile from Spanish rule in the Chilean War of Independence	10 pesos	obverse	1990
Bernardo O'Higgins	1778–1842	Independence leader who freed Chile from Spanish rule in the Chilean War of Independence	50 pesos	obverse	1981
Raúl Silva Henríquez	1907–1999	Bishop of Valparaíso (1959–1961); Archbishop of Santiago de Chile (1961–1983); advocate for social justice and democracy and a forthright vocal critic of the military dictatorship of Augusto Pinochet	500 pesos	obverse	2000

=== Colombia ===
Currency: Peso (since 1837)
Symbol: $
Subdivision: Centavo (1/100)
Currency code: COP
See also Colombian peso.

Person	Years of birth and death	Reason for honor	Denomination	Obverse or reverse	In circulation since
Simón Bolívar	1783–1830	Military and political leader who played a leading role in the establishment of Venezuela, Bolivia, Colombia, Ecuador, Peru and Panama as sovereign states, independent of Spanish rule; President of the Second Republic of Venezuela (1813–1814); President of the Third Republic of Venezuela (1817–1819); 1st President of Gran Colombia (1819–1830); 1st President of Bolivia (August 12 – December 29, 1815); 6th President of Peru (1824–1827)	$20	obverse	1989

=== Cook Islands ===
Currency: Dollar (since 1972)
Symbol: $
Subdivision: Cent (1/100)
Currency code: CKD (unofficial)
See also Cook Islands dollar.

Person	Years of birth and death	Reason for honor	Denomination	Obverse or reverse	In circulation since
James Cook	1728–1779	Discovered the Cook Islands	1 cent	reverse	2003 (circulating commemorative coin)
Elizabeth II	1926–2022	Queen of the United Kingdom (1952–2022)	1 cent	obverse	1972
Elizabeth II	1926–2022	Queen of the United Kingdom (1952–2022)	2 cents	obverse	1972
Elizabeth II	1926–2022	Queen of the United Kingdom (1952–2022)	5 cents	obverse	1972
Elizabeth II	1926–2022	Queen of the United Kingdom (1952–2022)	10 cents	obverse	1972
Elizabeth II	1926–2022	Queen of the United Kingdom (1952–2022)	20 cents	obverse	1972
Elizabeth II	1926–2022	Queen of the United Kingdom (1952–2022)	50 cents	obverse	1972
Elizabeth II	1926–2022	Queen of the United Kingdom (1952–2022)	1 dollar	obverse	1972
Elizabeth II	1926–2022	Queen of the United Kingdom (1952–2022)	2 dollars	obverse	1987
Elizabeth II	1926–2022	Queen of the United Kingdom (1952–2022)	5 dollars	obverse	1987

=== Cuba ===
Currency: Peso (since 1857)
Symbol: $
Subdivision: Centavo (1/100)
Currency code: CUP
See also Cuban peso.

Person	Years of birth and death	Reason for honor	Denomination	Obverse or reverse	In circulation since
José Martí	1853–1895	Nationalist, poet, philosopher, essayist, journalist, translator, professor, and publisher; national hero of Cuba	1 peso	reverse	1992
Che Guevara	1928–1967	Revolutionary, physician, author, guerrilla leader, diplomat, and military theorist	3 pesos	reverse	1992
Antonio Maceo	1845–1896	Second-in-command of the Cuban Army of Independence	5 pesos	reverse	2016

=== Czech Republic ===
Currency: Koruna (since 1993)
Symbol: Kč
Subdivision: Haléř (1/100)
Symbol: h
Currency code: CZK
See also Czech koruna and coins of the Czech koruna.

Person	Years of birth and death	Reason for honor	Denomination	Obverse or reverse	In circulation since
Wenceslaus I	907-929/35	patron saint of the Czech Republic	20 Kč	reverse	1993

=== Denmark ===
Currency: Krone (since 1873)
Symbol: kr
Subdivision: Øre (1/100)
Currency code: DKK
See also Danish krone.

Person	Years of birth and death	Reason for honor	Denomination	Obverse or reverse	In circulation since
Margrethe II	1940–	Queen of Denmark (1972–2024)	10 kr	obverse	1989
Margrethe II	1940–	Queen of Denmark (1972–2024)	20 kr	obverse	1989

=== Dominican Republic ===
Currency: Peso (since 1844)
Symbol: $
Subdivision: Centavo (1/100)
Symbol: ¢
Currency code: DOP
See also Dominican peso.

Person	Years of birth and death	Reason for honor	Denomination	Obverse or reverse	In circulation since
Francisco del Rosario Sánchez	1817–1861	2nd Founding Father of the Republic	$5	obverse	1997
Juan Pablo Duarte	1813–1876	1st Founding Father of the Republic	$1	obverse	1991
Gregorio Luperón	1839–1897	3rd Founding Father of the Republic	$10	obverse	2005
Ramón Matías Mella	1816–1864	Hero of the Dominican War of Independence (1844)	$25	obverse	2005

=== Eastern Caribbean States ===
Currency: Dollar (since 1981)
Symbol: $
Subdivision: Cent (1/100)
Currency code: XCD
See also Eastern Caribbean dollar.

Person	Years of birth and death	Reason for honor	Denomination	Obverse or reverse	In circulation since
Elizabeth II	1926–2022	Queen of the United Kingdom (1952–2022)	1 cent	obverse	1981
Elizabeth II	1926–2022	Queen of the United Kingdom (1952–2022)	2 cents	obverse	1981
Elizabeth II	1926–2022	Queen of the United Kingdom (1952–2022)	5 cents	obverse	1981
Elizabeth II	1926–2022	Queen of the United Kingdom (1952–2022)	10 cents	obverse	1981
Elizabeth II	1926–2022	Queen of the United Kingdom (1952–2022)	25 cents	obverse	1981
Elizabeth II	1926–2022	Queen of the United Kingdom (1952–2022)	$1	obverse	1981
Elizabeth II	1926–2022	Queen of the United Kingdom (1952–2022)	$2	obverse	2011
Elizabeth II	1926–2022	Queen of the United Kingdom (1952–2022)	$10	obverse	1981
Sir Arthur Lewis	1915–1991	First president and founder of the Caribbean Development Bank	$2	reverse	1993 (commemorative circulating coin)

=== Ecuador ===
Currency: Ecuadorian centavo (since 2000)
See also Ecuadorian centavo coins.

Person	Years of birth and death	Reason for honor	Denomination	Obverse or reverse	In circulation since
Juan Montalvo	1832–1889	Author and essayist	5 centavos	reverse	2000
Eugenio Espejo	1747–1795	Writer, lawyer and physician	10 centavos	reverse	2000
José Joaquín de Olmedo	1780–1847	Head of Provisional Government of Ecuador (March 6 – December 8, 1845)	25 centavos	reverse	2000
Eloy Alfaro	1842–1912	15th President of Ecuador (1906–1911)	50 centavos	reverse	2000

=== European Union ===
Currency: euro (since 2002)
Symbol: €
Subdivision: Cent (1/100)
Symbol: n/a
Currency code: EUR
See also euro and euro coins.

Person	Years of birth and death	Reason for honor	Denomination	Obverse or reverse	In circulation since
Albert II	1934–	King of the Belgians (1993–2013)	€0.01	reverse (Belgium)	2002
Albert II	1934–	King of the Belgians (1993–2013)	€0.02	reverse (Belgium)	2002
Albert II	1934–	King of the Belgians (1993–2013)	€0.05	reverse (Belgium)	2002
Albert II	1934–	King of the Belgians (1993–2013)	€0.10	reverse (Belgium)	2002
Albert II	1934–	King of the Belgians (1993–2013)	€0.20	reverse (Belgium)	2002
Albert II	1934–	King of the Belgians (1993–2013)	€0.50	reverse (Belgium)	2002
Albert II	1934–	King of the Belgians (1993–2013)	€1	reverse (Belgium)	2002
Albert II	1934–	King of the Belgians (1993–2013)	€2	reverse (Belgium)	2002
Philippe	1960–	King of the Belgians (2013–)	€0.01	reverse (Belgium)	2014
Philippe	1960–	King of the Belgians (2013–)	€0.02	reverse (Belgium)	2014
Philippe	1960–	King of the Belgians (2013–)	€0.05	reverse (Belgium)	2014
Philippe	1960–	King of the Belgians (2013–)	€0.10	reverse (Belgium)	2014
Philippe	1960–	King of the Belgians (2013–)	€0.20	reverse (Belgium)	2014
Philippe	1960–	King of the Belgians (2013–)	€0.50	reverse (Belgium)	2014
Philippe	1960–	King of the Belgians (2013–)	€1	reverse (Belgium)	2014
Philippe	1960–	King of the Belgians (2013–)	€2	reverse (Belgium)	2014
Albert II	1958–	Prince of Monaco	€1	reverse (Monaco)	2002
Albert II	1958–	Prince of Monaco	€1	reverse (Monaco)	2005
Albert II	1958–	Prince of Monaco	€2	reverse (Monaco)	2005
Dante Alighieri	1265–1321	author of The Divine Comedy	€2	reverse (Italy)	2002
Beatrix	1938–	Queen of the Netherlands (1980–2013)	€0.01	reverse (Netherlands)	2002
Beatrix	1938–	Queen of the Netherlands (1980–2013)	€0.02	reverse (Netherlands)	2002
Beatrix	1938–	Queen of the Netherlands (1980–2013)	€0.05	reverse (Netherlands)	2002
Beatrix	1938–	Queen of the Netherlands (1980–2013)	€0.10	reverse (Netherlands)	2002
Beatrix	1938–	Queen of the Netherlands (1980–2013)	€0.20	reverse (Netherlands)	2002
Beatrix	1938–	Queen of the Netherlands (1980–2013)	€0.50	reverse (Netherlands)	2002
Beatrix	1938–	Queen of the Netherlands (1980–2013)	€1	reverse (Netherlands)	2002
Beatrix	1938–	Queen of the Netherlands (1980–2013)	€2	reverse (Netherlands)	2002
Willem-Alexander	1967–	King of the Netherlands (2013–)	€0.01	reverse (Netherlands)	2014
Willem-Alexander	1967–	King of the Netherlands (2013–)	€0.02	reverse (Netherlands)	2014
Willem-Alexander	1967–	King of the Netherlands (2013–)	€0.05	reverse (Netherlands)	2014
Willem-Alexander	1967–	King of the Netherlands (2013–)	€0.10	reverse (Netherlands)	2014
Willem-Alexander	1967–	King of the Netherlands (2013–)	€0.20	reverse (Netherlands)	2014
Willem-Alexander	1967–	King of the Netherlands (2013–)	€0.50	reverse (Netherlands)	2014
Willem-Alexander	1967–	King of the Netherlands (2013–)	€1	reverse (Netherlands)	2014
Willem-Alexander	1967–	King of the Netherlands (2013–)	€2	reverse (Netherlands)	2014
Francis	1936–2025	Pope of the Roman Catholic Church (2013–2025)	€0.01	reverse (Vatican)	2014
Francis	1936–2025	Pope of the Roman Catholic Church (2013–2025)	€0.02	reverse (Vatican)	2014
Francis	1936–2025	Pope of the Roman Catholic Church (2013–2025)	€0.05	reverse (Vatican)	2014
Francis	1936–2025	Pope of the Roman Catholic Church (2013–2025)	€0.10	reverse (Vatican)	2014
Francis	1936–2025	Pope of the Roman Catholic Church (2013–2025)	€0.20	reverse (Vatican)	2014
Francis	1936–2025	Pope of the Roman Catholic Church (2013–2025)	€0.50	reverse (Vatican)	2014
Francis	1936–2025	Pope of the Roman Catholic Church (2013–2025)	€1	reverse (Vatican)	2014
Francis	1936–2025	Pope of the Roman Catholic Church (2013–2025)	€2	reverse (Vatican)	2014
Benedict XVI	1927–2022	Pope of the Roman Catholic Church (2005–2013)	€0.01	reverse (Vatican)	2006
Benedict XVI	1927–2022	Pope of the Roman Catholic Church (2005–2013)	€0.02	reverse (Vatican)	2006
Benedict XVI	1927–2022	Pope of the Roman Catholic Church (2005–2013)	€0.05	reverse (Vatican)	2006
Benedict XVI	1927–2022	Pope of the Roman Catholic Church (2005–2013)	€0.10	reverse (Vatican)	2006
Benedict XVI	1927–2022	Pope of the Roman Catholic Church (2005–2013)	€0.20	reverse (Vatican)	2006
Benedict XVI	1927–2022	Pope of the Roman Catholic Church (2005–2013)	€0.50	reverse (Vatican)	2006
Benedict XVI	1927–2022	Pope of the Roman Catholic Church (2005–2013)	€1	reverse (Vatican)	2006
Benedict XVI	1927–2022	Pope of the Roman Catholic Church (2005–2013)	€2	reverse (Vatican)	2006
John Capodistria	1776–1831	1st head of state of independent Greece	€0.20	reverse (Greece)	2002
Miguel de Cervantes	1547–1616	novelist, poet, playwright; father of Spanish literature	€0.10	reverse (Spain)	2002
Miguel de Cervantes	1547–1616	novelist, poet, playwright; father of Spanish literature	€0.20	reverse (Spain)	2002
Miguel de Cervantes	1547–1616	novelist, poet, playwright; father of Spanish literature	€0.50	reverse (Spain)	2002
Rigas Feraios	1757–1798	revolutionary; first casualty of the Greek War of Independence	€0.10	reverse (Greece)	2002
Henri	1955–	Grand Duke of Luxembourg (2000–2025)	€0.01	reverse (Luxembourg)	2002
Henri	1955–	Grand Duke of Luxembourg (2000–2025)	€0.02	reverse (Luxembourg)	2002
Henri	1955–	Grand Duke of Luxembourg (2000–2025)	€0.05	reverse (Luxembourg)	2002
Henri	1955–	Grand Duke of Luxembourg (2000–2025)	€0.10	reverse (Luxembourg)	2002
Henri	1955–	Grand Duke of Luxembourg (2000–2025)	€0.20	reverse (Luxembourg)	2002
Henri	1955–	Grand Duke of Luxembourg (2000–2025)	€0.50	reverse (Luxembourg)	2002
Henri	1955–	Grand Duke of Luxembourg (2000–2025)	€1	reverse (Luxembourg)	2002
Henri	1955–	Grand Duke of Luxembourg (2000–2025)	€2	reverse (Luxembourg)	2002
John Paul II	1920–2005	Pope of the Roman Catholic Church (1978–2005); Saint of the Roman Catholic Church	€0.01	reverse (Vatican)	2002
John Paul II	1920–2005	Pope of the Roman Catholic Church (1978–2005); Saint of the Roman Catholic Church	€0.02	reverse (Vatican)	2002
John Paul II	1920–2005	Pope of the Roman Catholic Church (1978–2005); Saint of the Roman Catholic Church	€0.05	reverse (Vatican)	2002
John Paul II	1920–2005	Pope of the Roman Catholic Church (1978–2005); Saint of the Roman Catholic Church	€0.10	reverse (Vatican)	2002
John Paul II	1920–2005	Pope of the Roman Catholic Church (1978–2005); Saint of the Roman Catholic Church	€0.20	reverse (Vatican)	2002
John Paul II	1920–2005	Pope of the Roman Catholic Church (1978–2005); Saint of the Roman Catholic Church	€0.50	reverse (Vatican)	2002
John Paul II	1920–2005	Pope of the Roman Catholic Church (1978–2005); Saint of the Roman Catholic Church	€1	reverse (Vatican)	2002
John Paul II	1920–2005	Pope of the Roman Catholic Church (1978–2005); Saint of the Roman Catholic Church	€2	reverse (Vatican)	2002
Juan Carlos I	1938–	King of Spain (1975–2014)	€1	reverse (Spain)	2002
Juan Carlos I	1938–	King of Spain (1975–2014)	€2	reverse (Spain)	2002
Felipe VI	1968–	King of Spain (2014–)	€1	reverse (Spain)	2015
Felipe VI	1968–	King of Spain (2014–)	€2	reverse (Spain)	2015
Marcus Aurelius	121–180	Emperor of the Roman Empire (161–180)	€0.50	reverse (Italy)	2002
Wolfgang Amadeus Mozart	1756–1791	Classical composer and pianist	€1	reverse (Austria)	2002
Saint Marinus	???-366	Founder of San Marino (301)	€0.20	reverse (San Marino)	2002
France Prešeren	1800–1849	Poet; author of the lyrics to the national anthem	€2	reverse (Slovenia)	2007
Rainier III	1923–2005	Prince of Monaco (1949–2005)	€1	reverse (Monaco)	2002
Rainier III	1923–2005	Prince of Monaco (1949–2005)	€2	reverse (Monaco)	2002
Primož Trubar	1508–1586	Founder and first superintendent of the Protestant Church of Slovenia	€1	reverse (Slovenia)	2007
Eleftherios Venizelos	1864–1936	Statesman and diplomat	€0.50	reverse (Greece)	2002
Bertha von Suttner	1843–1914	Winner of the Nobel Peace Prize (1905)	€2	reverse (Austria)	2002
Nikola Tesla	1856–1943	Inventor, electrical engineer, mechanical engineer, and futurist; best known for his contributions to the design of the modern alternating current (AC) electricity supply system	€0.10	reverse (Croatia)	2023
Nikola Tesla	1856–1943	Inventor, electrical engineer, mechanical engineer, and futurist; best known for his contributions to the design of the modern alternating current (AC) electricity supply system	€0.20	reverse (Croatia)	2023
Nikola Tesla	1856–1943	Inventor, electrical engineer, mechanical engineer, and futurist; best known for his contributions to the design of the modern alternating current (AC) electricity supply system	€0.50	reverse (Croatia)	2023
Simone Veil	1927–2017	French magistrate, Holocaust survivor, and politician who served as Health Minister in several governments and was President of the European Parliament (1979–1982); best remembered for advancing women's rights in France, in particular for the 1975 law that legalized abortion, today known as the Veil Act (French: Loi Veil); member of the Constitutional Council (1998–2007)	€0.10	reverse (France)	2024
Josephine Baker	1906–1975	Dancer, singer and actress	€0.20	reverse (France)	2024
Marie Curie	1867–1934	Physicist and chemist who conducted pioneering research on radioactivity; the first woman to win the Nobel Prize, the first person to win a Nobel Prize twice, and the only person to win a Nobel Prize in two scientific fields; for discovering polonium and radium	€0.50	reverse (France)	2024

=== Falkland Islands ===
Currency: Pound (since 1833)
Symbol: £
Subdivision: Penny (1/100)
Currency code: FKP
See also Falkland Islands pound.

Person	Years of birth and death	Reason for honor	Denomination	Obverse or reverse	In circulation since
Elizabeth II	1926–2022	Queen of the United Kingdom (1952–2022)	1 penny	obverse	1974
Elizabeth II	1926–2022	Queen of the United Kingdom (1952–2022)	2 pence	obverse	1974
Elizabeth II	1926–2022	Queen of the United Kingdom (1952–2022)	5 pence	obverse	1974
Elizabeth II	1926–2022	Queen of the United Kingdom (1952–2022)	10 pence	obverse	1974
Elizabeth II	1926–2022	Queen of the United Kingdom (1952–2022)	20 pence	obverse	1982
Elizabeth II	1926–2022	Queen of the United Kingdom (1952–2022)	50 pence	obverse	1980
Elizabeth II	1926–2022	Queen of the United Kingdom (1952–2022)	£1	obverse	1987
Elizabeth II	1926–2022	Queen of the United Kingdom (1952–2022)	£2	obverse	2004

=== Fiji ===
Currency: Dollar (since 1969)
Symbol: $
Subdivision: Cent (1/100)
Currency code: FJD
See also Fijian dollar.

Person	Years of birth and death	Reason for honor	Denomination	Obverse or reverse	In circulation since
Elizabeth II	1926–2022	Queen of the United Kingdom (1952–2022)	1 cent	obverse	1969
Elizabeth II	1926–2022	Queen of the United Kingdom (1952–2022)	2 cents	obverse	1969
Elizabeth II	1926–2022	Queen of the United Kingdom (1952–2022)	5 cents	obverse	1969
Elizabeth II	1926–2022	Queen of the United Kingdom (1952–2022)	10 cents	obverse	1969
Elizabeth II	1926–2022	Queen of the United Kingdom (1952–2022)	20 cents	obverse	1969
Elizabeth II	1926–2022	Queen of the United Kingdom (1952–2022)	50 cents	obverse	1975
Elizabeth II	1926–2022	Queen of the United Kingdom (1952–2022)	$1	obverse	1995

=== Guatemala ===
Currency: Quetzal (since 1925)
Symbol: Q
Subdivision: Centavo (1/100)
Currency code: GTQ
See also Guatemalan quetzal.

Person	Years of birth and death	Reason for honor	Denomination	Obverse or reverse	In circulation since
Bartolomé de las Casas	1484–1566	Priest; advocate for the rights of Indigenous people	1 centavo	obverse	1965
Concepción Ramírez	1942–	Representing Indigenous people	25 centavos	obverse	1959

=== Guernsey ===
Currency: Guernsey pound (since 1921)
Symbol: £
Subdivision: Penny (1/100)
Currency code: GGP (unofficial)
See also Guernsey pound.

Person	Years of birth and death	Reason for honor	Denomination	Obverse or reverse	In circulation since
Elizabeth II	1926–2022	Queen of the United Kingdom (1952–2022)	1 penny	obverse	1998
Elizabeth II	1926–2022	Queen of the United Kingdom (1952–2022)	2 pence	obverse	1998
Elizabeth II	1926–2022	Queen of the United Kingdom (1952–2022)	5 pence	obverse	1998
Elizabeth II	1926–2022	Queen of the United Kingdom (1952–2022)	10 pence	obverse	1998
Elizabeth II	1926–2022	Queen of the United Kingdom (1952–2022)	20 pence	obverse	1998
Elizabeth II	1926–2022	Queen of the United Kingdom (1952–2022)	50 pence	obverse	1998
Elizabeth II	1926–2022	Queen of the United Kingdom (1952–2022)	2 pounds	obverse	1998

=== Haiti ===
Currency: Gourde (since 1813)
Symbol: G
Subdivision: Centime (1/100)
Currency code: HTG
See also Haitian gourde.

Person	Years of birth and death	Reason for honor	Denomination	Obverse or reverse	In circulation since
Charlemagne Péralte	1886–1919	Nationalist leader who opposed the United States occupation of Haiti in 1915	5 centimes	obverse	1986
Charlemagne Péralte	1886–1919	Nationalist leader who opposed the United States occupation of Haiti in 1915	20 centimes	obverse	1986
Charlemagne Péralte	1886–1919	Nationalist leader who opposed the United States occupation of Haiti in 1915	50 centimes	obverse	1986
Toussaint Louverture	1743–1803	General and the most prominent leader of the Haitian Revolution	5 gourdes	obverse	1995
Henri Christophe (King Henri I)	1767–1820	President of the State of Haiti (1807–1811); King of Haiti (1811–1820)	5 gourdes	obverse	1995
Jean-Jacques Dessalines	1758–1806	Governor-General of Haiti (January 1 – September 2, 1804); Emperor of Haiti (1804–1806)	5 gourdes	obverse	1995
Alexandre Pétion	1770–1818	1st President of Haiti (1807–1818)	5 gourdes	obverse	1995

=== Honduras ===
Currency: Lempira (since 1931)
Symbol: L
Subdivision: Centavo (1/100)
Currency code: HNL
See also Honduran lempira.

Person	Years of birth and death	Reason for honor	Denomination	Obverse or reverse	In circulation since
Lempira	????-1537	Lencas leader who fought against Spanish conquistadors	20 centavos	obverse	1967
Lempira	????-1537	Lencas leader who fought against Spanish conquistadors	50 centavos	obverse	1967

=== Indonesia ===
Currency: Rupiah (since 1945)
Subdivision: Sen (1/100)
Currency code: IDR
See also coins of the rupiah and Indonesian rupiah.

Person	Years of birth and death	Reason for honor	Denomination	Obverse or reverse	In circulation since
Dipå Negårå	1785–1855	Javanese prince who opposed the Dutch colonial rule (leader of Java War between 1825 and 1830); National Hero	50 sen (50cent; Rp0.5)	reverse	1952
Sukarno	1901–1970	Indonesian statesman, activist, and revolutionary who served as the first president of Indonesia (1945–1967); the Father of Proclamation; National Hero	1, 2, 5, 10, 25 & 50 sen (cent), and Rp2.5	obverse	1962, 1963
Herman Johannes	1912–1992	7th Minister of Public Works of the Republic of Indonesia (1950–1951); 2nd Rector of Gadjah Mada University (1961–1966); National Hero	Rp100	obverse	2016
Tjipto Mangoenkoesoemo	1886–1943	Political mentor of Indonesian president Sukarno; one of the three founders of the influential Indische Party; National Hero	Rp200	obverse	2016
T. B. Simatupang	1920–1990	Soldier who served in the Indonesian National Revolution; chief of staff of the Indonesian Armed Forces; National Hero	Rp500	obverse	2016
I Gusti Ketut Pudja	1908–1977	1st Governor of Lesser Sunda (1945–1949); National Hero	Rp1,000	obverse	2016

=== Isle of Man ===
Currency: Pound (since 1971)
Symbol: £
Subdivision: Penny (1/100)
Currency code: IMP (unofficial)
See also Manx pound.

Person	Years of birth and death	Reason for honor	Denomination	Obverse or reverse	In circulation since
Elizabeth II	1926–2022	Queen of the United Kingdom (1952–2022); Lord of Mann	1 penny	obverse	1971
Elizabeth II	1926–2022	Queen of the United Kingdom (1952–2022); Lord of Mann	2 pence	obverse	1971
Elizabeth II	1926–2022	Queen of the United Kingdom (1952–2022); Lord of Mann	5 pence	obverse	1971
Elizabeth II	1926–2022	Queen of the United Kingdom (1952–2022); Lord of Mann	10 pence	obverse	1971
Elizabeth II	1926–2022	Queen of the United Kingdom (1952–2022); Lord of Mann	20 pence	obverse	1982
Elizabeth II	1926–2022	Queen of the United Kingdom (1952–2022); Lord of Mann	50 pence	obverse	1971
Elizabeth II	1926–2022	Queen of the United Kingdom (1952–2022); Lord of Mann	£1	obverse	1978
Elizabeth II	1926–2022	Queen of the United Kingdom (1952–2022); Lord of Mann	£2	obverse	1988
Elizabeth II	1926–2022	Queen of the United Kingdom (1952–2022); Lord of Mann	£5	obverse	1981

=== Jamaica ===
Currency: Dollar (since 1969)
Symbol: $
Subdivision: Cent (1/100)
Currency code: JMD
See also Jamaican dollar.

Person	Years of birth and death	Reason for honor	Denomination	Obverse or reverse	In circulation since
Alexander Bustamante	1884–1977	Chief Minister of Jamaica (1953–1955); Prime Minister of Jamaica (1962–1967)	$1	reverse	1990
Paul Bogle	1822–1865	Leader of the Morant Bay Rebellion (1865)	10 cents	reverse	1991
Marcus Garvey	1887–1940	Founder of UNIA-ACL (1914)	25 cents	reverse	1991
Marcus Garvey	1887–1940	Founder of UNIA-ACL (1914)	$20	reverse	1999
George William Gordon	1820–1865	Statesman	$10	reverse	1991
Norman Washington Manley	1893–1969	Chief Minister of Jamaica (1955–1962)	$5	reverse	1994

=== Jersey ===
Currency: Jersey pound (since 1837)
Symbol: £
Subdivision: Penny (1/100)
Currency code: JEP (unofficial)
See also Jersey pound.

Person	Years of birth and death	Reason for honor	Denomination	Obverse or reverse	In circulation since
Elizabeth II	1926–2022	Queen of the United Kingdom (1952–2022)	1 penny	obverse	1998
Elizabeth II	1926–2022	Queen of the United Kingdom (1952–2022)	2 pence	obverse	1998
Elizabeth II	1926–2022	Queen of the United Kingdom (1952–2022)	5 pence	obverse	1998
Elizabeth II	1926–2022	Queen of the United Kingdom (1952–2022)	10 pence	obverse	1998
Elizabeth II	1926–2022	Queen of the United Kingdom (1952–2022)	20 pence	obverse	1998
Elizabeth II	1926–2022	Queen of the United Kingdom (1952–2022)	50 pence	obverse	1998
Elizabeth II	1926–2022	Queen of the United Kingdom (1952–2022)	2 pounds	obverse	1998

=== Jordan ===
Currency: Dinar (since 1949)
Subdivision: Qirsh or Piastre (1/100)
Currency code: JOD
See also Jordanian dinar.

Person	Years of birth and death	Reason for Hhnor	Denomination	Obverse or reverse	In circulation since
Abdullah II	1962–	King of Jordan (1999–)	1 qirsh	reverse	2000
Abdullah II	1962–	King of Jordan (1999–)	5 piastres	reverse	2000
Abdullah II	1962–	King of Jordan (1999–)	10 piastres	reverse	2000
Abdullah II	1962–	King of Jordan (1999–)	¼ dinar	reverse	2004
Abdullah II	1962–	King of Jordan (1999–)	½ dinar	reverse	2000
Hussein	1935–1999	King of Jordan (1952–1999)	½ qirsh	reverse	1996
Hussein	1935–1999	King of Jordan (1952–1999)	2½ piastres	reverse	1992
Hussein	1935–1999	King of Jordan (1952–1999)	1 dinar	reverse	1998

=== Kenya ===
Currency: Shilling (since 1966)
Subdivision: Cent (1/100)
Currency code: KES
See also Kenyan shilling.

Person	Years of birth and death	Reason for honor	Denomination	Obverse or reverse	In circulation since
Mzee Jomo Kenyatta	1893–1978	1st Prime Minister of Kenya (1963–1964); 1st President of Kenya (1964–1978)	5 cents	obverse	2005
Mzee Jomo Kenyatta	1893–1978	1st Prime Minister of Kenya (1963–1964); 1st President of Kenya (1964–1978)	10 cents	obverse	2005
Mzee Jomo Kenyatta	1893–1978	1st Prime Minister of Kenya (1963–1964); 1st President of Kenya (1964–1978)	50 cents	obverse	2005
Mzee Jomo Kenyatta	1893–1978	1st Prime Minister of Kenya (1963–1964); 1st President of Kenya (1964–1978)	1 shilling	obverse	2005
Mzee Jomo Kenyatta	1893–1978	1st Prime Minister of Kenya (1963–1964); 1st President of Kenya (1964–1978)	5 shillings	obverse	2005
Mzee Jomo Kenyatta	1893–1978	1st Prime Minister of Kenya (1963–1964); 1st President of Kenya (1964–1978)	10 shillings	obverse	2005
Mzee Jomo Kenyatta	1893–1978	1st Prime Minister of Kenya (1963–1964); 1st President of Kenya (1964–1978)	20 shillings	obverse	2005

=== Lesotho ===
Currency: Loti (pl. Maloti) (since 1979)
Symbol: L or M (pl.)
Subdivision: Sente (1/100)
Currency code: LSL
See also Lesotho loti.

Person	Years of birth and death	Reason for honor	Denomination	Obverse or reverse	In circulation since
King Moshoeshoe II (Constantine Bereng Seeiso)	1938–1996	King of Lesotho (1966–1996)	1 sente	obverse	1979
King Moshoeshoe II (Constantine Bereng Seeiso)	1938–1996	King of Lesotho (1966–1996)	2 lisente	obverse	1979
King Moshoeshoe II (Constantine Bereng Seeiso)	1938–1996	King of Lesotho (1966–1996)	5 lisente	obverse	1979
King Moshoeshoe II (Constantine Bereng Seeiso)	1938–1996	King of Lesotho (1966–1996)	10 lisente	obverse	1979
King Moshoeshoe II (Constantine Bereng Seeiso)	1938–1996	King of Lesotho (1966–1996)	25 lisente	obverse	1979
King Moshoeshoe II (Constantine Bereng Seeiso)	1938–1996	King of Lesotho (1966–1996)	50 lisente	obverse	1979
King Moshoeshoe II (Constantine Bereng Seeiso)	1938–1996	King of Lesotho (1966–1996)	1 loti	obverse	1979
King Moshoeshoe I	1786–1870	King of Lesotho (1822–1870)	1 loti	obverse	1998
King Letsie III	1963–	King of Lesotho (1996–)	5 maloti	obverse	2016 (circulating commemorative coin)

=== Mexico ===
Currency: Peso (since 1821)
Symbol: $
Subdivision: Centavo (1/100)
Symbol: ¢
Currency Code: MXN
See also Mexican peso.

Person	Years of birth and death	Reason for honor	Denomination	Obverse or reverse	In circulation since
Juan de la Barrera	1828–1847	One of the six Niños Héroes, military cadets who died fighting against US forces in the Mexican–American War in 1847	$50	reverse	1993
Juan Escutia	1830–1847	One of the six Niños Héroes, military cadets who died fighting against US forces in the Mexican–American War in 1847	$50	reverse	1993
Miguel Hidalgo	1753–1811	Catholic priest; leader of the Mexican War of Independence	$20	reverse	1993
Francisco Márquez	1834–1847	One of the six Niños Héroes, military cadets who died fighting against US forces in the Mexican–American War in 1847	$50	reverse	1993
Agustín Melgar	1830–1847	One of the six Niños Héroes, military cadets who died fighting against US forces in the Mexican–American War in 1847	$50	reverse	1993
Fernando Montes de Oca	1830–1847	One of the six Niños Héroes, military cadets who died fighting against US forces in the Mexican–American War in 1847	$50	reverse	1993
Octavio Paz	1914–1998	Winner of the Nobel Prize in Literature (1990)	$20	reverse	2000
Vicente Suárez	1833–1847	One of the six Niños Héroes, military cadets who died fighting against US forces in the Mexican–American War in 1847	$50	reverse	1993

=== Mongolia ===
Currency: Tögrög (since 1925)
Symbol: ₮
Subdivision: Möngö (1/100)
Currency code: MNT
See also Mongolian tögrög.

Person	Years of birth and death	Reason for honor	Denomination	Obverse or reverse	In circulation since
Damdin Sükhbaatar	1893–1923	Military hero; victorious against both the Chinese and Russian armies	₮500	reverse	2001

=== Morocco ===
Currency: Dirham (since 1882)
Symbol: د.م.
Subdivision: Santim (1/100)
Currency code: MAD
See also Moroccan dirham.

Person	Years of birth and death	Reason for honor	Denomination	Obverse or reverse	In circulation since
Hassan II	1929–1999	King of Morocco (1961–1999)	5 dirhams	obverse	1987
Hassan II	1929–1999	King of Morocco (1961–1999)	10 dirhams	obverse	1995
Mohammed VI	1963–	King of Morocco (1999–)	1 dirham	obverse	2002
Mohammed VI	1963–	King of Morocco (1999–)	2 dirhams	obverse	2002
Mohammed VI	1963–	King of Morocco (1999–)	5 dirhams	obverse	2002
Mohammed VI	1963–	King of Morocco (1999–)	10 dirhams	obverse	2002

=== New Zealand ===
Currency: Dollar (since 1967)
Symbol: $
Subdivision: Cent (1/100)
Symbol: c
Currency code: NZD
See also New Zealand dollar and coins of the New Zealand dollar.

Person	Years of birth and death	Reason for honor	Denomination	Obverse or reverse	In circulation since
Elizabeth II	1926–2022	Queen of New Zealand (1952–2022)	10c	obverse	2006
Elizabeth II	1926–2022	Queen of New Zealand (1952–2022)	20c	obverse	2006
Elizabeth II	1926–2022	Queen of New Zealand (1952–2022)	50c	obverse	2006
Elizabeth II	1926–2022	Queen of New Zealand (1952–2022)	$1	obverse	1990
Elizabeth II	1926–2022	Queen of New Zealand (1952–2022)	$2	obverse	1990

=== Nigeria ===
Currency: Naira (since 1973)
Symbol: ₦
Subdivision: Kobo (1/100)
Currency code: NGN
See also Nigerian naira.

Person	Years of birth and death	Reason for honor	Denomination	Obverse or reverse	In circulation since
Herbert Macauley	1864–1946	National leader in colonial Nigeria	₦1	obverse	2007

=== Norway ===
Currency: Krone (since 1875)
Symbol: kr
Subdivision: Øre (1/100)
Currency code: NOK
See also Norwegian krone.

Person	Years of birth and death	Reason for honor	Denomination	Obverse or reverse	In circulation since
Harald V	1937–	King of Norway (1991–)	10 kr	obverse	1995
Harald V	1937–	King of Norway (1991–)	20 kr	obverse	1994

=== Pakistan ===
Currency: Rupee (since 1947)
Symbol: Rs.
Subdivision: Paisa (1/100)
Currency code: PKR
See also Pakistani rupee.

Person	Years of birth and death	Reason for honor	Denomination	Obverse or reverse	In circulation since
Muhammad Ali Jinnah	1876–1948	1st Governor-General of Pakistan (1947–1948); "Father of the Nation"	Rs. 1	obverse	1998
Benazir Bhutto	1953–2007	Prime Minister of Pakistan (11th: 1988–1990; 13th: 1993–1996)	Rs. 10	reverse	2008

=== Panama ===
Currency: Balboa (since 1904)
Symbol: B/.
Subdivision: Centésimo (1/100)
Currency code: PAB
See also Panamanian balboa.

Person	Years of birth and death	Reason for honor	Denomination	Obverse or reverse	In circulation since
Urracá	?-1531	Ngäbe Amerindian chieftain or cacique who effectively fought against Spanish conquistadors	1 centésimo	obverse	1996
Sara Sotillo	1900–1961	Educator, feminist, and founder of the National Feminist Party of Panama	5 centésimos	reverse	2001 (circulating commemorative coin)
Vasco Núñez de Balboa	1475–1519	Explorer, governor, and conquistador; best known for having crossed the Isthmus of Panama to the Pacific Ocean in 1513, becoming the first European to lead an expedition to have seen or reached the Pacific from the New World	1/10 Balboa	reverse	1996
Vasco Núñez de Balboa	1475–1519	Explorer, governor, and conquistador; best known for having crossed the Isthmus of Panama to the Pacific Ocean in 1513, becoming the first European to lead an expedition to have seen or reached the Pacific from the New World	¼ Balboa	reverse	1996
Vasco Núñez de Balboa	1475–1519	Explorer, governor, and conquistador; best known for having crossed the Isthmus of Panama to the Pacific Ocean in 1513, becoming the first European to lead an expedition to have seen or reached the Pacific from the New World	½ Balboa	reverse	1996
Vasco Núñez de Balboa	1475–1519	Explorer, governor, and conquistador; best known for having crossed the Isthmus of Panama to the Pacific Ocean in 1513, becoming the first European to lead an expedition to have seen or reached the Pacific from the New World	1 Balboa	reverse	2011

=== Paraguay ===
Currency: Guaraní (since 1943)
Symbol:
Subdivision: Céntimo (1/100)
Currency code: PYG
See also Paraguayan guaraní.

Person	Years of birth and death	Reason for honor	Denomination	Obverse or reverse	In circulation since
Bernardino Caballero	1839–1912	President of Paraguay (1880–1886)	500	obverse	1997
José E. Díaz	????-1867	General; hero of the Battle of Curupaity (1866)	100	obverse	1990
José Félix Estigarribia	1888–1940	President of Paraguay (1939–1940)	50	obverse	1975
Eugenio A. Garay	????-????	General	10	obverse	1975

=== Philippines ===
Currency: Piso (since 1852)
Symbol: ₱
Subdivision: Sentimo (1/100)
Currency code: PHP
See also Philippine peso and coins of the Philippine peso.

Person	Years of birth and death	Reason for honor	Denomination	Obverse or reverse	In circulation since
Emilio Aguinaldo	1869–1964	1st President of the Philippines (1899–1901)	₱5	obverse	1995
Andrés Bonifacio	1863–1897	Leader in the Philippine Revolution	₱10	obverse	2000
Andrés Bonifacio	1863–1897	Leader in the Philippine Revolution	₱5	obverse	2017
Apolinario Mabini	1864–1903	1st Prime Minister of the Philippines (1899); author of the Malolos Constitution	₱10	obverse	2018
José Rizal	1861–1896	Hero of the Philippine Revolution	₱1	obverse	2018
Manuel L. Quezon	1878–1944	2nd President of the Philippines (1935–1944)	₱20	obverse	2019

=== Russia ===
Currency: Ruble (since 1710)
Symbol: руб/₽
Subdivision: Kopek (1/100)
Symbol: к
Currency code: RUB
See also Russian ruble.

Person	Years of birth and death	Reason for honor	Denomination	Obverse or reverse	In circulation since
Saint George	278–303	Patron saint of Moscow	1к	obverse	1997
Saint George	278–303	Patron saint of Moscow	5к	obverse	1997
Saint George	278–303	Patron saint of Moscow	10к	obverse	1997
Saint George	278–303	Patron saint of Moscow	50к	obverse	1997
A.S. Pushkin	1799–1837	Influential Russian poet	1к	reverse	1999 (circulating commemorative coin)
Aleksei Yeryomenko	-1942	55th anniversary of victory in the Great Patriotic War	10к	reverse	2000 (circulating commemorative coin)
Yuri Gagarin	1934–1968	First human to travel into space	2к	reverse	2001 (circulating commemorative coin)
Yuri Gagarin	1934–1968	First human to travel into space	10к	reverse	2001 (circulating commemorative coin)
Mikhail Kutuzov	1745–1813	General field marshal during the Patriotic War of 1812	2к	reverse	2012 (circulating commemorative coin)
M.A. Barclay de Tolly	1761–1818	General field marshal during the Patriotic War of 1812	2к	reverse	2012 (circulating commemorative coin)
Pyotr Bagration	1765–1812	Infantry general during the Patriotic War of 1812	2к	reverse	2012 (circulating commemorative coin)
Levin August von Bennigsen	1745–1826	Cavalry general during the Patriotic War of 1812	2к	reverse	2012 (circulating commemorative coin)
Pyotr Wittgenstein	1769–1843	General field marshal during the Patriotic War of 1812	2к	reverse	2012 (circulating commemorative coin)
Denis Davydov	1784–1839	Lieutenant general during the Patriotic War of 1812	2к	reverse	2012 (circulating commemorative coin)
Dmitry Dokhturov	1756–1816	Infantry general during the Patriotic War of 1812	2к	reverse	2012 (circulating commemorative coin)
Nadezhda Durova	1783–1866	Staff captain during the Patriotic War of 1812	2к	reverse	2012 (circulating commemorative coin)
Aleksey Yermolov	1777–1861	Infantry general during the Patriotic War of 1812	2к	reverse	2012 (circulating commemorative coin)
Vasilisa Kozhina	c. 1780-c. 1840	Organizer of the partisan movement	2к	reverse	2012 (circulating commemorative coin)
Alexander Kutaysov		Major general during the Patriotic War of 1812	2к	reverse	2012 (circulating commemorative coin)
Mikhail Miloradovich	1771–1825	Infantry general during the Patriotic War of 1812	2к	reverse	2012 (circulating commemorative coin)
Alexander Ostermann-Tolstoy	1770–1857	Infantry general during the Patriotic War of 1812	2к	reverse	2012 (circulating commemorative coin)
Nikolay Raevsky	1771–1829	Cavalry general during the Patriotic War of 1812	2к	reverse	2012 (circulating commemorative coin)
Matvei Platov	1753–1818	Cavalry general during the Patriotic War of 1812	2к	reverse	2012 (circulating commemorative coin)
Tsar Alexander I	1777–1825	Emperor of Russia	2к	reverse	2012 (circulating commemorative coin)
Yuri Nikulin	1921–1997	Yury Nikulin's creative works	25к	reverse	2021 (circulating commemorative coin)

=== Serbia ===
Currency: Dinar (since 2003)
Symbol: din.
Subdivision: Para (1/100)
Currency code: RSD
See also Serbian dinar.

Person	Years of birth and death	Reason for honor	Denomination	Obverse or reverse	In circulation since
Nikola Tesla	1856–1943	father of AC power	20 din.	obverse	2003

=== Sierra Leone ===
Currency: Leone (since 1964)
Symbol: Le
Subdivision: Cent (1/100)
Currency code: SLE
See also Sierra Leonean leone.

Person	Years of birth and death	Reason for honor	Denomination	Obverse or reverse	In circulation since
Sullay Abu Bakarr		Musician	1 cent	obverse	2022
Israel Olorunfeh Cole		Musician	5 cents	obverse	2022
Sooliman Ernest Rogers		Musician	10 cents	obverse	2022
Bassie Sorie Kondi		Musician	25 cents	obverse	2022
Salia Koroma		Musician	50 cents	obverse	2022

=== Solomon Islands ===
Currency: Dollar (since 1977)
Symbol: $
Subdivision: Cent (1/100)
Currency code: SBD
See also Solomon Islands dollar.

Person	Years of birth and death	Reason for honor	Denomination	Obverse or reverse	In circulation since
Elizabeth II	1926–2022	Queen of the United Kingdom (1952–2022)	10 cents	obverse	2012
Elizabeth II	1926–2022	Queen of the United Kingdom (1952–2022)	20 cents	obverse	2012
Elizabeth II	1926–2022	Queen of the United Kingdom (1952–2022)	50 cents	obverse	2012
Elizabeth II	1926–2022	Queen of the United Kingdom (1952–2022)	1 dollar	obverse	2012
Elizabeth II	1926–2022	Queen of the United Kingdom (1952–2022)	2 dollars	obverse	2012

=== South Korea ===
Currency: Won (since 1962)
Symbol: ₩
Subdivision: Jeon (1/100)
Currency code: KRW
See also South Korean won.

Person	Years of birth and death	Reason for honor	Denomination	Obverse or reverse	In circulation since
Yi Sun-sin	1545–1598	Naval leader during the Japanese invasions of Korea (1592–1598)	₩100	obverse	1970
Yi Sun-sin	1545–1598	Naval leader during the Japanese invasions of Korea (1592–1598)	₩100	obverse	1983

=== Republic of China (Taiwan) ===
Currency: New Taiwan Dollar (since 1949)
Symbol: $
Subdivision: Jiao (1/10), Cent (1/100)
Currency code: TWD
See also New Taiwan dollar.

Person	Years of birth and death	Reason for honor	Denomination	Obverse or reverse	In circulation since
Chiang Kai-shek	1887–1975	President of the Republic of China (1948–1975)	NT$1	obverse	1981
Chiang Kai-shek	1887–1975	President of the Republic of China (1948–1975)	NT$5	obverse	1981
Chiang Kai-shek	1887–1975	President of the Republic of China (1948–1975)	NT$10	obverse	1981
Sun Yat-sen	1866–1925	Founding father of the Republic of China	NT$10	obverse	2011
Sun Yat-sen	1866–1925	Founding father of the Republic of China	NT$50	obverse	2002
Mona Rudao	1882–1930	Seediq chief; leader of the Wushe Incident	NT$20	obverse	2001
Chiang Ching-kuo	1910–1988	President of the Republic of China (1978–1988)	NT$10	obverse	2010 (circulating commemorative coin)
Chiang Wei-shui	1891–1931	Leader of the colonial resistance movement	NT$10	obverse	2010 (circulating commemorative coin)

=== Tajikistan ===
Currency: Somoni (since 2000)
Symbol: SM
Subdivision: Diram (1/100)
Currency code: TJS
See also Tajikistani somoni.

Person	Years of birth and death	Reason for honor	Denomination	Obverse or reverse	In circulation since
Isma'il ibn Ahmad (Somoni)	849–907	Amir of Transoxiana (892–907) and Khorasan (900–907)	1 somoni	obverse	2001
Mirzo Tursunzoda	1911–1977	Poet	1 somoni	obverse	2018
Shirinsho Shotemur	1899–1937	Politician	3 somoni	obverse	2018
Rudaki (Abuabdulloh Rudaki)	858–941	Founder of Tajik classic literature	5 somoni	obverse	2001
Sadriddin Ayni	1878–1954	Poet, writer, novelist, journalist and historian; recipient of the Order of Lenin	5 somoni	obverse	2018

=== Thailand ===
Currency: Baht (since 1925)
Symbol: ฿
Subdivision: Satang (1/100)
Symbol: st
Currency code: THB
See also Thai baht.

Person	Years of birth and death	Reason for honor	Denomination	Obverse or reverse	In circulation since
Vajiralongkorn	1952–	King of Thailand (2016–)	1st	obverse	2018
Vajiralongkorn	1952–	King of Thailand (2016–)	5st	obverse	2018
Vajiralongkorn	1952–	King of Thailand (2016–)	10st	obverse	2018
Vajiralongkorn	1952–	King of Thailand (2016–)	25st	obverse	2018
Vajiralongkorn	1952–	King of Thailand (2016–)	50st	obverse	2018
Vajiralongkorn	1952–	King of Thailand (2016–)	฿1	obverse	2018
Vajiralongkorn	1952–	King of Thailand (2016–)	฿2	obverse	2018
Vajiralongkorn	1952–	King of Thailand (2016–)	฿5	obverse	2018
Vajiralongkorn	1952–	King of Thailand (2016–)	฿10	obverse	2018

=== Tonga ===
Currency: Paʻanga (since 1967)
Symbol: T$
Subdivision: Seniti (1/100)
Currency code: TOP
See also Tongan paʻanga.

Person	Years of birth and death	Reason for honor	Denomination	Obverse or reverse	In circulation since
King Tupou VI of Tonga	1959–	King of Tonga (2012–)	5 setini	obverse	2015
King Tupou VI of Tonga	1959–	King of Tonga (2012–)	10 setini	obverse	2015
King Tupou VI of Tonga	1959–	King of Tonga (2012–)	20 sentini	obverse	2015
King Tupou VI of Tonga	1959–	King of Tonga (2012–)	50 sentini	obverse	2015
King Siaosi (George) Tupou V of Tonga	1948–2012	King of Tonga (2006–2012)	1 paʻanga	obverse	2015

=== Transnistria ===
Currency: Ruble (since 1994)
Symbol:
Subdivision: Kopeck (1/100)
Currency code: PRB or RUP (unofficial)
See also Transnistrian rubla.

Person	Years of birth and death	Reason for honor	Denomination	Obverse or reverse	In circulation since
Alexander Suvorov	1730–1800	General of the Imperial Russian Army; founder of the city and capital of Tiraspol	1 rubla	obverse	2014
François Sainte de Wollant	1752–1818	Engineer	3 rubles	obverse	2014
Pyotr Alexandrovich Rumyantsev-Zadunaisky	1725–1796	General of the Russian Empire, Collegium of Little Russia	5 rubles	obverse	2014
Catherine II (the Great)	1729–1796	Empress of the Russian Empire	10 rubles	obverse	2014

=== Ukraine ===
Currency: Hryvnia (pl. Hryvni and Hryven) (since 1996)
Symbol: ₴
Subdivision: Kopiyka (1/100)
Currency code: UAH
See also Ccins of the Ukrainian hryvnia and Ukrainian hryvnia.

Person	Years of birth and death	Reason for honor	Denomination	Obverse or reverse	In circulation since
Volodymyr I	958–1015	Prince of Kyiv and Novgorod (978–1015)	₴1	obverse	2004
Volodymyr I	958–1015	Prince of Kyiv and Novgorod (978–1015)	₴1	obverse	2018
Yaroslav I	978–1054	Prince of Kyiv and Novgorod	₴2	obverse	2018
Bohdan Khmelnytsky	1595–1657	Hetman of Ukraine (1648–1657)	₴5	obverse	2019
Ivan Mazepa	1640–1709	Hetman of Ukraine (1687–1708)	₴10	obverse	2020

=== United Kingdom ===
Currency: pound sterling (since 1158)
Symbol: £
Subdivision: Penny (1/100)
Symbol: p
Currency code: GBP
See also coins of the pound sterling and pound sterling.

Person	Years of birth and death	Reason for honor	Denomination	Obverse or reverse	In circulation since
Isambard K. Brunel	1806–1859	Prominent English engineer during the Industrial Revolution	£2	reverse	2006 (circulating commemorative coin)
Charles III	1948-	King of the United Kingdom (2022-)	50p	obverse	2022 (circulating commemorative coin)
Charles III	1948–	King of the United Kingdom (2022–)	1p	obverse	2023
Charles III	1948–	King of the United Kingdom (2022–)	2p	obverse	2023
Charles III	1948–	King of the United Kingdom (2022–)	5p	obverse	2023
Charles III	1948–	King of the United Kingdom (2022–)	10p	obverse	2023
Charles III	1948–	King of the United Kingdom (2022–)	20p	obverse	2023
Charles III	1948–	King of the United Kingdom (2022–)	50p	obverse	2023
Charles III	1948–	King of the United Kingdom (2022–)	£1	obverse	2023
Charles III	1948–	King of the United Kingdom (2022–)	£2	obverse	2023
Charles Darwin	1809–1882	Contributions to evolutionary biology	£2	reverse	2009 (circulating commemorative coin)
Elizabeth II	1926–2022	Queen of the United Kingdom (1952–2022)	1p	obverse	1971
Elizabeth II	1926–2022	Queen of the United Kingdom (1952–2022)	2p	obverse	1971
Elizabeth II	1926–2022	Queen of the United Kingdom (1952–2022)	5p	obverse	1968
Elizabeth II	1926–2022	Queen of the United Kingdom (1952–2022)	10p	obverse	1968
Elizabeth II	1926–2022	Queen of the United Kingdom (1952–2022)	20p	obverse	1982
Elizabeth II	1926–2022	Queen of the United Kingdom (1952–2022)	50p	obverse	1969
Elizabeth II	1926–2022	Queen of the United Kingdom (1952–2022)	£1	obverse	1983
Elizabeth II	1926–2022	Queen of the United Kingdom (1952–2022)	£2	obverse	1997
King John of England	1166–1216	King of England (1199–1216); signed Magna Carta	£2	reverse	2015 (circulating commemorative coin)
Lord Kitchener	1850–1916	British army officer during World War I	£2	reverse	2014 (circulating commemorative coin)

=== United States ===
Currency: Dollar (since 1792)
Symbol: $
Subdivision: Cent (1/100)
Symbol: ¢
Currency code: USD

Person	Years of birth and death	Reason for honor	Denomination	Obverse or reverse	In circulation since
John Adams	1735–1826	2nd President of the United States (1797–1801)	$1	obverse	2007
John Quincy Adams	1767–1848	6th President of the United States (1825–1829)	$1	obverse	2008
Maya Angelou	1928–2014	Poet, memorist and civil rights activist	25¢	reverse (American Women quarter)	2022
Susan B. Anthony	1820–1906	Suffragist and women's rights activist	$1	obverse	1979
James Buchanan	1791–1868	15th President of the United States (1857–1861)	$1	obverse	2010
John Carver	~1984–1621	Governor of Plymouth Colony	$1	reverse (Native American dollar)	2011
Jean Baptiste Charbonneau	1805–1866	Sacagawea's son	$1	obverse	2000
William Clark	1770–1838	Co-leader of the Corps of Discovery	25¢	reverse (MO state quarter)	2003
Bessie Coleman	1892–1926	First African American and female aviator	25¢	reverse (American Women quarter)	2023
Polly Cooper	Unknown	Oneida woman who assisted George Washington during the American Revolutionary War	$1	reverse (Native American dollar)	2026
Celia Cruz	1925–2003	Singer and actress; known as the "Queen of Salsa" for her contributions to Latin music	25¢	reverse (American Women quarter)	2024
Duke Ellington	1899–1974	Jazz composer, pianist, and orchestra leader	25¢	reverse (District of Columbia quarter)	2009
Millard Fillmore	1800–1874	13th President of the United States (1850–1853)	$1	obverse	2010
James Garfield	1831–1881	20th President of the United States (1881)	$1	obverse	2011
Althea Gibson	1927–2003	Tennis player, first Black athlete to break the color barrier at the highest level of international tennis	25¢	reverse (American Women quarter)	2025
Juliette Gordon Low	1860–1927	Founder of the Girl Scouts of the United States of America	25¢	reverse (American Women quarter)	2025
Ulysses S. Grant	1822–1885	18th President of the United States (1869–1877)	$1	obverse	2011
General Edward Hand	1744–1802	Continental Army Officer	25¢	reverse (NJ state quarter)	1999
Rutherford B. Hayes	1822–1893	19th President of the United States (1877–1881)	$1	obverse	2011
William Henry Harrison	1773–1841	9th President of the United States (1841)	$1	obverse	2009
John Herrington	1958–	Astronaut; first enrolled citizen of a Native American tribe to enter outer space	$1	reverse (Native American dollar)	2019
Jovita Idar	1885–1946	Journalist, teacher, political activist, and civil rights worker who championed the cause of Mexican-Americans and Mexican immigrants	25¢	reverse (American Women quarter)	2023
Andrew Jackson	1767–1845	7th President of the United States (1829–1837)	$1	obverse	2008
Thomas Jefferson	1743–1846	3rd President of the United States (1801–1809); author of the United States Declaration of Independence	5¢	obverse	1938
Thomas Jefferson	1743–1846	3rd President of the United States (1801–1809); author of the United States Declaration of Independence	25¢	reverse (SD state quarter)	2006
Thomas Jefferson	1743–1846	3rd President of the United States (1801–1809); author of the United States Declaration of Independence	$1	obverse	2007
Andrew Johnson	1808–1875	17th President of the United States (1865–1869)	$1	obverse	2011
Kamehameha I	1758?–1819	King of Hawaii (1795–1819)	25¢	reverse (HI state quarter)	2008
Edith Kanakaʻole	1913–1979	Dancer, chanter, teacher, and kumu hula	25¢	reverse (American Women quarter)	2023
Helen Keller	1880–1968	Deafblind activist, author and lecturer	25¢	reverse (AL state quarter)	2003
John F. Kennedy	1917–1963	35th President of the United States (1917–1963)	50¢	obverse	1964
Meriwether Lewis	1774–1809	leader of the Corps of Discovery	25¢	reverse (MO state quarter)	2003
Abraham Lincoln	1809–1865	16th President of the United States (1861–1865)	1¢	both	1909
Abraham Lincoln	1809–1865	future president	25¢	reverse (IL state quarter)	2003
Abraham Lincoln	1809–1865	16th President of the United States (1861–1865)	25¢	reverse (SD state quarter)	2006
Abraham Lincoln	1809–1865	16th President of the United States (1861–1865)	$1	obverse	2010
James Madison	1751–1836	4th President of the United States (1809–1817)	$1	obverse	2007
Wilma Mankiller	1945–2010	Cherokee activist, social worker, community developer and the first woman elected to serve as Principal Chief of the Cherokee Nation	25¢	reverse (American Women quarter)	2022
Stacey Milbern	1987–2020	Disability activist	25¢	reverse (American Women quarter)	2025
Patsy Mink	1927–2002	Member of the U.S. House of Representatives from Hawaii (1965–1977; 1990–2002); first woman of color and the first Asian-American woman elected to Congress, and is known for her work on legislation advancing women's rights and education	25¢	reverse (American Women quarter)	2024
James Monroe	1758–1831	Revolutionary War hero	25¢	reverse (NJ state quarter)	1999
James Monroe	1758–1831	5th President of the United States (1817–1825)	$1	obverse	2008
John Muir	1838–1914	One of the first modern preservationists	25¢	reverse (CA state quarter)	2005
Pauli Murray	1910–1985	Civil rights activist, advocate, legal scholar and theorist, author and Episcopal priest; her work influencing the civil rights movement and expanded legal protection for gender equality	25¢	Reverse (American Women quarter)	2024
Nina Otero-Warren	1881–1965	Suffragist, educator, and politician	25¢	reverse (American Women quarter)	2022
Ousamequin	1581–1661	Leader of Wampanoag Confederacy	$1	reverse (Native American dollar)	2011
Ely S. Parker	1828–1895	Civil War colonel and Commissioner of Indian Affairs	$1	reverse (Native American dollar)	2022
Elizabeth Peratrovich	1911–1958	Alaska Native activist	$1	reverse (Native American dollar)	2018
Franklin Pierce	1804–1869	14th President of the United States (1853–1857)	$1	obverse	2010
James K. Polk	1795–1849	11th President of the United States (1845–1849)	$1	obverse	2009
Mary Kawena Pukui	1895–1986	Hawaiian scholar and educator	$1	reverse (Native American dollar)	2025
Caesar Rodney	1728–1784	Rode all night from Dover, Delaware, to Philadelphia, Pennsylvania, to cast the deciding vote for the Declaration of Independence (1776)	25¢	reverse (Delaware state quarter)	1999
Eleanor Roosevelt	1884–1962	First Lady of the United States (1933–1945); 1st Chair of the United Nations Commission on Human Rights (1946–1952); 1st United States Representative to the United Nations Commission on Human Rights (1947–1953); 1st Chair of the Presidential Commission on the Status of Women (1961–1962)	25¢	reverse (American Women quarter)	2023
Franklin D. Roosevelt	1882–1945	32nd President of the United States (1933–1945)	10¢	obverse	1946
Theodore Roosevelt	1858–1919	26th President of the United States (1901–1909)	25¢	reverse (SD state quarter)	2006
Vera Rubin	1928–2016	Astronomer who uncovered evidence for existence of dark matter; first Jewish person on U.S. currency	25¢	reverse (American Women quarter)	2025
Sacagawea	1787–1812	guide to the Corps of Discovery	$1	obverse	2000
Sally Ride	1951–2012	Astronaut and physicist	25¢	reverse (American Women quarter)	2022
Mary Golda Ross	1908–2008	Cherokee engineer	$1	reverse (Native American dollar)	2019
Sequoyah	1770–1843	Creator of the Cherokee syllabary	$1	reverse (Native American dollar)	2017
Maria Tallchief	1925–2013	First Native American prima ballerina	25¢	reverse (American Women quarter)	2023
Maria Tallchief	1925–2013	First Native American prima ballerina	$1	reverse (Native American dollar)	2023
Jim Thorpe	1887–1953	Sac and Fox Olympic athlete	$1	reverse (Native American dollar)	2018
John Tyler	1790–1862	10th President of the United States (1841–1845)	$1	obverse	2009
Zachary Taylor	1784–1850	12th President of the United States (1849–1850)	$1	obverse	2009
George Washington	1732–1799	1st President of the United States (1789–1797)	25¢	obverse	1932
George Washington	1732–1799	General of the Continental Army	25¢	reverse (NJ state quarter)	1999
George Washington	1732–1799	For crossing the Delaware River during the American Revolution	25¢	reverse	2021
George Washington	1732–1799	1st President of the United States (1789–1797)	25¢	reverse (SD state quarter)	2006
George Washington	1732–1799	1st President of the United States (1789–1797)	$1	obverse	2007
Martin Van Buren	1782–1862	8th President of the United States (1837–1841)	$1	obverse	2008
Mary Edwards Walker	1832–1919	Receiving the Medal of Honor during the American Civil War, was the first female U.S. Army surgeon, prohibitionist, abolitionist, first and only female Medal of Honor recipient	25¢	reverse (American Women quarter)	2024
Ida B. Wells	1862–1931	Investigative journalist, suffragist, educator, and civil rights leader.	25¢	reverse (American Women quarter)	2025
Prince Whipple	1750–1796	African American Slave, accompanied General Whipple of NH	25¢	reverse (NJ state quarter)	1999
Anna May Wong	1905–1961	The first Chinese American Hollywood movie star, as well as the first Chinese American actress to gain international recognition	25¢	reverse (American Women quarter)	2022
Orville Wright	1871–1948	Brothers who built the first airplane	25¢	reverse (NC state quarter)	2001
Wilbur Wright	1867–1912	Brothers who built the first airplane	25¢	reverse (NC state quarter)	2001
York	1770–1831	Explorer; Corps of Discovery	25¢	reverse (MO state quarter)	2003
Zitkala-Ša	1876–1938	Writer, editor, translator, musician, educator, and political activist	25¢	reverse (American Women quarter)	2024

=== Venezuela ===
Currency: Bolívar (since 1879)
Symbol: Bs.
Subdivision: Céntimo (1/100)
Currency code: VED
See also Venezuelan bolívar.

Person	Years of birth and death	Reason for honor	Denomination	Obverse or reverse	In circulation since
Simón Bolívar	1783–1830	Military and political leader who played a leading role in the establishment of Venezuela, Bolivia, Colombia, Ecuador, Peru and Panama as sovereign states, independent of Spanish rule; President of the Second Republic of Venezuela (1813–1814); President of the Third Republic of Venezuela (1817–1819); 1st President of Gran Colombia (1819–1830); 1st President of Bolivia (August 12 – December 29, 1815); 6th President of Peru (1824–1827)	25 céntimos	obverse	2021
Simón Bolívar	1783–1830	Military and political leader who played a leading role in the establishment of Venezuela, Bolivia, Colombia, Ecuador, Peru and Panama as sovereign states, independent of Spanish rule; President of the Second Republic of Venezuela (1813–1814); President of the Third Republic of Venezuela (1817–1819); 1st President of Gran Colombia (1819–1830); 1st President of Bolivia (August 12 – December 29, 1815); 6th President of Peru (1824–1827)	50 céntimos	obverse	2021
Simón Bolívar	1783–1830	Military and political leader who played a leading role in the establishment of Venezuela, Bolivia, Colombia, Ecuador, Peru and Panama as sovereign states, independent of Spanish rule; President of the Second Republic of Venezuela (1813–1814); President of the Third Republic of Venezuela (1817–1819); 1st President of Gran Colombia (1819–1830); 1st President of Bolivia (August 12 – December 29, 1815); 6th President of Peru (1824–1827)	1 bolívar	obverse	2021

== Coins no longer in circulation ==
=== Albania ===
Currency/Subdivision: Lek/qindarkë

Person	Years of Birth/Death	Reason for Honor	Currency	Denomination	Obverse or Reverse	Years of circulation
Alexander the Great	356 BC-323 BC	King of Macedonia	Albanian lek	1 lek	obverse & reverse	1926–1939

=== Argentina ===
Currency/Subdivision: Peso Moneda Nacional (m$n, 1881–1969)/Centavo (¢, 1/100)
Currency/Subdivision: Peso Ley ($L, 1970–1983)/Centavo (¢, 1/100)
Currency/Subdivision: Peso Argentino ($a, 1983–1985)/Centavo (¢, 1/100)
Currency/Subdivision: Austral (A, 1985–1991)/Centavo (¢, 1/100)
Currency/Subdivision: Peso ($, 1992–Present)/Centavo (¢, 1/100)
Currency Codes: ARM, ARL, ARP, ARA, ARS
See also Argentine peso moneda nacional, Argentine peso ley, Argentine peso argentino, Argentine austral, and Argentine peso.

Person	Years of Birth/Death	Reason for Honor	Currency	Denomination	Obverse or Reverse	Years of Circulation
Guillermo Brown	1777–1857	Father of the Argentine Navy	Peso Ley	$L10	obverse	1977–1984
José de San Martín	1778–1850	Leader for independence from Spain	Peso Moneda Nacional	5¢	obverse	1950–1965
José de San Martín	1778–1850	Leader for independence from Spain	Peso Moneda Nacional	5¢	obverse	1953–1965
José de San Martín	1778–1850	Leader for independence from Spain	Peso Moneda Nacional	10¢	obverse	1950–1966
José de San Martín	1778–1850	Leader for independence from Spain	Peso Moneda Nacional	10¢	obverse	1952–1966
José de San Martín	1778–1850	Leader for independence from Spain	Peso Moneda Nacional	20¢	obverse	1950–1967
José de San Martín	1778–1850	Leader for independence from Spain	Peso Moneda Nacional	20¢	obverse	1952–1967
José de San Martín	1778–1850	Leader for independence from Spain	Peso Moneda Nacional	50¢	obverse	1952–1969
José de San Martín	1778–1850	Leader for independence from Spain	Peso Ley	$L50	obverse	1978–1984
José de San Martín	1778–1850	Leader for independence from Spain	Peso Ley	$L100	obverse	1978–1984
José de San Martín	1778–1850	Leader for independence from Spain	Peso Ley	$L100	obverse	1978–1984
Domingo Faustino Sarmiento	1811–1888	President of Argentina (1868–1874)	Peso Moneda Nacional	m$n25	obverse	1950–1965

=== Australia ===
Currency/Subdivision: Pound (£, 1813–1966)/Penny (d, 1/240)
Currency/Subdivision: Dollar ($, 1966–Present)/Cent (c, 1/100)
Currency Code: AUD
See also Australian pound, Australian dollar, Coins of the Australian pound and Coins of the Australian dollar.

Person	Years of Birth/Death	Reason for Honor	Currency	Denomination	Obverse or Reverse	Years of Circulation
Edward VII	1841–1910	King of the United Kingdom (1901–1910)	Pound	3d	obverse	1910–1966
Edward VII	1841–1910	King of the United Kingdom (1901–1910)	Pound	6d	obverse	1910–1966
Edward VII	1841–1910	King of the United Kingdom (1901–1910)	Pound	12d (1/- or 1 shilling)	obverse	1910–1966
Edward VII	1841–1910	King of the United Kingdom (1901–1910)	Pound	24d (2/- or 1 florin)	obverse	1910–1966
Elizabeth II	1926–2022	Queen of the United Kingdom (1952–2022)	Pound	1/2d	obverse	1953–1966
Elizabeth II	1926–2022	Queen of the United Kingdom (1952–2022)	Pound	1d	obverse	1953–1966
Elizabeth II	1926–2022	Queen of the United Kingdom (1952–2022)	Pound	3d	obverse	1953–1966
Elizabeth II	1926–2022	Queen of the United Kingdom (1952–2022)	Pound	6d	obverse	1953–1966
Elizabeth II	1926–2022	Queen of the United Kingdom (1952–2022)	Pound	12d (1/- or 1 shilling)	obverse	1953–1966
Elizabeth II	1926–2022	Queen of the United Kingdom (1952–2022)	Pound	24d (2/- or 1 florin)	obverse	1953–1966
Elizabeth II	1926–2022	Queen of the United Kingdom (1952–2022)	Dollar	1c	obverse	1966–1992
Elizabeth II	1926–2022	Queen of the United Kingdom (1952–2022)	Dollar	2c	obverse	1966–1992
George V	1865–1936	King of the United Kingdom (1910–1936)	Pound	1/2d	obverse	1911–1966
George V	1865–1936	King of the United Kingdom (1910–1936)	Pound	1d	obverse	1911–1966
George V	1865–1936	King of the United Kingdom (1910–1936)	Pound	3d	obverse	1911–1966
George V	1865–1936	King of the United Kingdom (1910–1936)	Pound	6d	obverse	1911–1966
George V	1865–1936	King of the United Kingdom (1910–1936)	Pound	12d (1/- or 1 shilling)	obverse	1911–1966
George V	1865–1936	King of the United Kingdom (1910–1936)	Pound	24d (2/- or 1 florin)	obverse	1911–1966
George VI	1895–1952	King of the United Kingdom (1936–1952)	Pound	1/2d	obverse	1938–1966
George VI	1895–1952	King of the United Kingdom (1936–1952)	Pound	1d	obverse	1938–1966
George VI	1895–1952	King of the United Kingdom (1936–1952)	Pound	3d	obverse	1938–1966
George VI	1895–1952	King of the United Kingdom (1936–1952)	Pound	6d	obverse	1938–1966
George VI	1895–1952	King of the United Kingdom (1936–1952)	Pound	12d (1/- or 1 shilling)	obverse	1938–1966
George VI	1895–1952	King of the United Kingdom (1936–1952)	Pound	24d (2/- or 1 florin)	obverse	1938–1966
George VI	1895–1952	King of the United Kingdom (1936–1952)	Pound	60d (5/- or 1 crown)	obverse	1937–1966

=== Belgium ===
Currency/Subdivision: Franc (fr., 1832–Present)/Centime (c., 1/100)
Currency Code: BEL
See also Belgian franc.

Person	Years of Birth/Death	Reason for Honor	Currency	Denomination	Obverse or Reverse	Years of Circulation
Albert I	1875–1934	King of Belgium (1909–1934)	Franc	50 c.	obverse	1910–1932
Albert I	1875–1934	King of Belgium (1909–1934)	Franc	1 fr.	obverse	1910–1932
Albert I	1875–1934	King of Belgium (1909–1934)	Franc	2 fr.	obverse	1910–1932
Albert I	1875–1934	King of Belgium (1909–1934)	Franc	5 fr. (1 Belga)	obverse	1926–1951
Albert I	1875–1934	King of Belgium (1909–1934)	Franc	10 fr. (2 Belgas)	obverse	1930–1934
Albert I	1875–1934	King of Belgium (1909–1934)	Franc	20 fr.	obverse	1914–1934
Albert I	1875–1934	King of Belgium (1909–1934)	Franc	20 fr. (4 Belgas)	obverse	1931–1934
Albert I	1875–1934	King of Belgium (1909–1934)	Franc	20 fr.	obverse	1933–1947
Leopold I	1790–1865	King of Belgium (1831–1865)	Franc	20 c.	obverse	1852–1860
Leopold I	1790–1865	King of Belgium (1831–1865)	Franc	20 c.	obverse	1860–1861
Leopold I	1790–1865	King of Belgium (1831–1865)	Franc	1/4 fr.	obverse	1832–1852
Leopold I	1790–1865	King of Belgium (1831–1865)	Franc	1/2 fr.	obverse	1832–1867
Leopold I	1790–1865	King of Belgium (1831–1865)	Franc	1 fr.	obverse	1832–1867
Leopold I	1790–1865	King of Belgium (1831–1865)	Franc	1 fr.	obverse	1880–1932
Leopold I	1790–1865	King of Belgium (1831–1865)	Franc	2 fr.	obverse	1832–1867
Leopold I	1790–1865	King of Belgium (1831–1865)	Franc	2 fr.	obverse	1880–1932
Leopold I	1790–1865	King of Belgium (1831–1865)	Franc	21/2 fr.	obverse	1848–1867
Leopold I	1790–1865	King of Belgium (1831–1865)	Franc	5 fr.	obverse	1832–1932
Leopold I	1790–1865	King of Belgium (1831–1865)	Franc	10 fr.	obverse	1849–1850
Leopold I	1790–1865	King of Belgium (1831–1865)	Franc	10 fr. (2 Belgas)	obverse	1930–1934
Leopold I	1790–1865	King of Belgium (1831–1865)	Franc	20 fr.	obverse	1865-1865
Leopold I	1790–1865	King of Belgium (1831–1865)	Franc	25 fr.	obverse	1848–1850
Leopold II	1835–1909	King of Belgium (1865–1909)	Franc	50 c.	obverse	1867–1932
Leopold II	1835–1909	King of Belgium (1865–1909)	Franc	50 c.	obverse	1901–1932
Leopold II	1835–1909	King of Belgium (1865–1909)	Franc	50 c.	obverse	1909–1932
Leopold II	1835–1909	King of Belgium (1865–1909)	Franc	1 fr.	obverse	1867–1932
Leopold II	1835–1909	King of Belgium (1865–1909)	Franc	1 fr.	obverse	1880–1932
Leopold II	1835–1909	King of Belgium (1865–1909)	Franc	1 fr.	obverse	1904–1932
Leopold II	1835–1909	King of Belgium (1865–1909)	Franc	2 fr.	obverse	1867–1932
Leopold II	1835–1909	King of Belgium (1865–1909)	Franc	2 fr.	obverse	1880–1932
Leopold II	1835–1909	King of Belgium (1865–1909)	Franc	2 fr.	obverse	1904–1932
Leopold II	1835–1909	King of Belgium (1865–1909)	Franc	5 fr.	obverse	1867–1932
Leopold II	1835–1909	King of Belgium (1865–1909)	Franc	10 fr. (2 Belgas)	obverse	1930–1934
Leopold II	1835–1909	King of Belgium (1865–1909)	Franc	20 fr.	obverse	1867–1882
Leopold III	1901–1983	King of Belgium (1934–1951)	Franc	5 fr.	obverse	1936–1972
Leopold III	1901–1983	King of Belgium (1934–1951)	Franc	20 fr.	obverse	1934–1946
Leopold III	1901–1983	King of Belgium (1934–1951)	Franc	50 fr.	obverse	1939–1947

=== Brunei ===
Currency/Subdivision: Dollar ($, 1967–Present)/Sen (1/100)
Currency Code: BND
See also Brunei dollar and Coins of the Brunei dollar.

Person	Years of Birth/Death	Reason for Honor	Currency	Denomination	Obverse or Reverse	Years of Circulation
Omar Ali Saifuddin III	1914–1986	28th Sultan of Brunei (1951–1967)	Dollar	1 sen	obverse	1967–1968
Omar Ali Saifuddin III	1914–1986	28th Sultan of Brunei (1951–1967)	Dollar	5 sen	obverse	1967–1968
Omar Ali Saifuddin III	1914–1986	28th Sultan of Brunei (1951–1967)	Dollar	10 sen	obverse	1967–1968
Omar Ali Saifuddin III	1914–1986	28th Sultan of Brunei (1951–1967)	Dollar	20 sen	obverse	1967–1968
Omar Ali Saifuddin III	1914–1986	28th Sultan of Brunei (1951–1967)	Dollar	50 sen	obverse	1967–1968
Hassanal Bolkiah	1946–	29th Sultan of Brunei (1967–)	Dollar	1 sen	obverse	1968–1996
Hassanal Bolkiah	1946–	29th Sultan of Brunei (1967–)	Dollar	5 sen	obverse	1968–1996
Hassanal Bolkiah	1946–	29th Sultan of Brunei (1967–)	Dollar	10 sen	obverse	1968–1996
Hassanal Bolkiah	1946–	29th Sultan of Brunei (1967–)	Dollar	20 sen	obverse	1968–1996
Hassanal Bolkiah	1946–	29th Sultan of Brunei (1967–)	Dollar	50 sen	obverse	1968–1996

=== Canada ===
Currency/Subdivision: Dollar ($, 1858–Present)/Cent (¢, 1/100)
Currency Code: CAD
See also Canadian dollar and Coins of the Canadian dollar.

Person	Years of Birth/Death	Reason for Honor	Currency	Denomination	Obverse or Reverse	Years of Circulation
Edward VII	1841–1910	King of the United Kingdom (1901–1910)	Pound Sterling	1¢	obverse	1902–1911
Edward VII	1841–1910	King of the United Kingdom (1901–1910)	Pound Sterling	5¢	obverse	1902–1911
Edward VII	1841–1910	King of the United Kingdom (1901–1910)	Pound Sterling	10¢	obverse	1902–1911
Edward VII	1841–1910	King of the United Kingdom (1901–1910)	Pound Sterling	25¢	obverse	1902–1911
Edward VII	1841–1910	King of the United Kingdom (1901–1910)	Pound Sterling	50¢	obverse	1902–1911
George V	1865–1936	King of the United Kingdom (1910–1936)	Pound Sterling	1¢	obverse	1911–1937
George V	1865–1936	King of the United Kingdom (1910–1936)	Pound Sterling	5¢	obverse	1911–1937
George V	1865–1936	King of the United Kingdom (1910–1936)	Pound Sterling	10¢	obverse	1911–1937
George V	1865–1936	King of the United Kingdom (1910–1936)	Pound Sterling	25¢	obverse	1911–1937
George V	1865–1936	King of the United Kingdom (1910–1936)	Pound Sterling	50¢	obverse	1911–1937
George V	1865–1936	King of the United Kingdom (1910–1936)	Pound Sterling	$1	obverse	1935–1937
George VI	1895–1952	King of the United Kingdom (1936–1952)	Pound Sterling	1¢	obverse	1937–1953
George VI	1895–1952	King of the United Kingdom (1936–1952)	Pound Sterling	5¢	obverse	1937–1953
George VI	1895–1952	King of the United Kingdom (1936–1952)	Pound Sterling	10¢	obverse	1937–1953
George VI	1895–1952	King of the United Kingdom (1936–1952)	Pound Sterling	25¢	obverse	1937–1953
George VI	1895–1952	King of the United Kingdom (1936–1952)	Pound Sterling	50¢	obverse	1937–1953
George VI	1895–1952	King of the United Kingdom (1936–1952)	Pound Sterling	$1	obverse	1937–1953
Queen Victoria	1819–1901	Queen of the United Kingdom (1837–1901)	Pound Sterling	1¢	obverse	1870–1901
Queen Victoria	1819–1901	Queen of the United Kingdom (1837–1901)	Pound Sterling	5¢	obverse	1870–1901
Queen Victoria	1819–1901	Queen of the United Kingdom (1837–1901)	Pound Sterling	10¢	obverse	1870–1901
Queen Victoria	1819–1901	Queen of the United Kingdom (1837–1901)	Pound Sterling	25¢	obverse	1870–1901
Queen Victoria	1819–1901	Queen of the United Kingdom (1837–1901)	Pound Sterling	50¢	obverse	1870–1901

=== Chile ===
Currency: Peso (1851–1959)
Symbol: $
Subdivision: Centavo (1/100)
Currency: Escudo (1960–1975)
Symbol: E°
Subdivision: Centésimo (1/100)
Currency Code: CLE, CLP
See also Chilean peso.

Person	Years of Birth/Death	Reason for Honor	Denomination	Obverse or Reverse	Years of Circulation
Bernardo O'Higgins	1778–1842	Leader during Chilean Independence War	20 centavos	obverse	1942–1954
Bernardo O'Higgins	1778–1842	Leader during Chilean Independence War	50 centavos	obverse	1942
Bernardo O'Higgins	1778–1842	Leader during Chilean Independence War	1 peso	obverse	1942–1954
Bernardo O'Higgins	1778–1842	Leader during Chilean Independence War	50 pesos	obverse	1968
Bernardo O'Higgins	1778–1842	Leader during Chilean Independence War	10 centésimos	obverse	1971
Arturo Prat	1848–1879	Chilean naval hero	5 pesos	obverse	1968
José Manuel Balmaceda	1840–1891	Chilean president	20 centésimos	obverse	1971–1972
Manuel Rodríguez	1785–1818	Chilean patriot	50 centésimos	obverse	1971
José Miguel Carrera	1785–1821	Chilean president	1 Escudo	obverse	1971–1972
Caupolicán	¿?-1558	Mapuche leader	2 Escudos	obverse	1971
Lautaro	c.1534–1557	Mapuche leader	5 Escudos	obverse	1971–1972

=== Cook Islands ===
Currency: Dollar (since 1972)
Symbol: $
Subdivision: Cent (1/100)
Currency Code: CKD (unofficial)
See also Cook Islands dollar.

Person	Years of Birth/Death	Reason for Honor	Denomination	Obverse or Reverse	Years of Circulation
Queen Elizabeth II	1926–2022	Queen of the United Kingdom (1952–2022)	1 cent	obverse	1972–1983
Queen Elizabeth II	1926–2022	Queen of the United Kingdom (1952–2022)	2 cents	obverse	1972–1983
Queen Elizabeth II	1926–2022	Queen of the United Kingdom (1952–2022)	5 cents	obverse	1972–1994
Queen Elizabeth II	1926–2022	Queen of the United Kingdom (1952–2022)	10 cents	obverse	1972–1994
Queen Elizabeth II	1926–2022	Queen of the United Kingdom (1952–2022)	20 cents	obverse	1972–1994
Queen Elizabeth II	1926–2022	Queen of the United Kingdom (1952–2022)	50 cents	obverse	1972–1992
Queen Elizabeth II	1926–2022	Queen of the United Kingdom (1952–2022)	50 tene	obverse	1988–1994
Queen Elizabeth II	1926–2022	Queen of the United Kingdom (1952–2022)	1 dollar	obverse	1972–1983
Queen Elizabeth II	1926–2022	Queen of the United Kingdom (1952–2022)	1 dollar	obverse	1987–1994
Queen Elizabeth II	1926–2022	Queen of the United Kingdom (1952–2022)	1 dollar	obverse	1994
Queen Elizabeth II	1926–2022	Queen of the United Kingdom (1952–2022)	2 dollars	obverse	1987–1994
Queen Elizabeth II	1926–2022	Queen of the United Kingdom (1952–2022)	5 dollars	obverse	1987–1994
Queen Elizabeth II	1926–2022	Queen of the United Kingdom (1952–2022)	5 dollars	obverse	2003

=== Cyprus ===
Currency: Pound (1879–2008)
Symbol: £
Subdivision: Cent (1/100) and Mil (1/1000)
Currency Code: CYP
See also Cypriot pound and Coins of the Cypriot pound.

Person	Years of Birth/Death	Reason for Honor	Denomination	Obverse or Reverse	Years of Circulation
Zeno of Citium	333 BC-264 BC	Hellenistic Stoic philosopher	20 cents	obverse	1983–2008

=== Czechoslovakia ===
Currency/Subdivision: Koruna (Kčs, 1919–1939 and 1945–1993)/Haléř or Halier (h, 1/100)
Currency Code: CSK
See also Czechoslovak koruna.

Person	Years of Birth/Death	Reason for Honor	Currency	Denomination	Obverse or Reverse	Years of Circulation
Juraj Jánošík	1688–1713	Outlaw; "Slovak Robin Hood"	Koruna	2 Kčs	reverse	1947–1953

=== Fiji ===
Currency/Subdivision: Pound (£, 1934–1969)/Penny (1/240)
Currency/Subdivision: Dollar ($, 1969–Present)/Cent (1/100)
Currency Code: FJD
See also Coins of the Fijian pound, Fijian pound and Fijian dollar.

Person	Years of Birth/Death	Reason for Honor	Currency	Denomination	Obverse or Reverse	Years of Circulation
Edward VIII	1894–1972	King of the United Kingdom (1936)	Pound	1 penny	obverse	1936–1937
Edward VIII	1894–1972	King of the United Kingdom (1936)	Pound	3 pence	obverse	1936–1937
Elizabeth II	1926–2022	Queen of the United Kingdom (1952–2022)	Pound	1/2 penny	obverse	1953–1969
Elizabeth II	1926–2022	Queen of the United Kingdom (1952–2022)	Pound	1 penny	obverse	1953–1969
Elizabeth II	1926–2022	Queen of the United Kingdom (1952–2022)	Pound	3 pence	obverse	1953–1969
Elizabeth II	1926–2022	Queen of the United Kingdom (1952–2022)	Pound	6 pence	obverse	1953–1969
Elizabeth II	1926–2022	Queen of the United Kingdom (1952–2022)	Pound	12 pence (1/- or 1 shilling)	obverse	1953–1969
Elizabeth II	1926–2022	Queen of the United Kingdom (1952–2022)	Pound	120 pence (10/- or 10 shillings)	obverse	1953–1969
Elizabeth II	1926–2022	Queen of the United Kingdom (1952–2022)	Pound	£1	obverse	1953–1969
Elizabeth II	1926–2022	Queen of the United Kingdom (1952–2022)	Pound	£5	obverse	1953–1969
George V	1865–1936	King of the United Kingdom (1910–1936)	Pound	1/2 penny	obverse	1934–1936
George V	1865–1936	King of the United Kingdom (1910–1936)	Pound	1 penny	obverse	1934–1936
George V	1865–1936	King of the United Kingdom (1910–1936)	Pound	6 pence	obverse	1934–1936
George V	1865–1936	King of the United Kingdom (1910–1936)	Pound	12 pence (1/- or 1 shilling)	obverse	1934–1936
George V	1865–1936	King of the United Kingdom (1910–1936)	Pound	120 pence (10/- or 10 shillings)	obverse	1934–1936
George V	1865–1936	King of the United Kingdom (1910–1936)	Pound	£1	obverse	1934–1936
George V	1865–1936	King of the United Kingdom (1910–1936)	Pound	£5	obverse	1934–1936
George VI	1895–1952	King of the United Kingdom (1910–1952)	Pound	1/2 penny	obverse	1937–1953
George VI	1895–1952	King of the United Kingdom (1910–1952)	Pound	1 penny	obverse	1937–1953
George VI	1895–1952	King of the United Kingdom (1910–1952)	Pound	3 pence	obverse	1937–1953
George VI	1895–1952	King of the United Kingdom (1910–1952)	Pound	6 pence	obverse	1937–1953
George VI	1895–1952	King of the United Kingdom (1910–1952)	Pound	12 pence (1/- or 1 shilling)	obverse	1937–1953
George VI	1895–1952	King of the United Kingdom (1910–1952)	Pound	120 pence (10/- or 10 shillings)	obverse	1937–1953
George VI	1895–1952	King of the United Kingdom (1910–1952)	Pound	£1	obverse	1937–1953
George VI	1895–1952	King of the United Kingdom (1910–1952)	Pound	£5	obverse	1937–1953

=== France ===
Currency: French franc (1795–2001)/Subdivision: Centime (1/100)
See also French franc.

Person	Years of Birth/Death	Reason for Honor	Currency	Denomination	Obverse or Reverse	Years of circulation
Napoleon Bonaparte	1769–1821	Provisional Consul of France (November 10 – December 12, 1799); First Consul of France (1799–1804); Emperor of the French (1st reign: 1804–1814; 2nd reign: March 20 – June 22, 1815)	Franc (1795–1959)	¼ franc	obverse	1803–1809
Napoleon Bonaparte	1769–1821	Provisional Consul of France (November 10 – December 12, 1799); First Consul of France (1799–1804); Emperor of the French (1st reign: 1804–1814; 2nd reign: March 20 – June 22, 1815)	Franc (1795–1959)	½ franc	obverse	1802–1814
Napoleon Bonaparte	1769–1821	Provisional Consul of France (November 10 – December 12, 1799); First Consul of France (1799–1804); Emperor of the French (1st reign: 1804–1814; 2nd reign: March 20 – June 22, 1815)	Franc (1795–1959)	1 franc	obverse	1802–1814
Napoleon Bonaparte	1769–1821	Provisional Consul of France (November 10 – December 12, 1799); First Consul of France (1799–1804); Emperor of the French (1st reign: 1804–1814; 2nd reign: March 20 – June 22, 1815)	Franc (1795–1959)	2 francs	obverse	1803–1815
Napoleon Bonaparte	1769–1821	Provisional Consul of France (November 10 – December 12, 1799); First Consul of France (1799–1804); Emperor of the French (1st reign: 1804–1814; 2nd reign: March 20 – June 22, 1815)	Franc (1795–1959)	5 francs	obverse	1802–1815
Napoleon Bonaparte	1769–1821	Provisional Consul of France (November 10 – December 12, 1799); First Consul of France (1799–1804); Emperor of the French (1st reign: 1804–1814; 2nd reign: March 20 – June 22, 1815)	Franc (1795–1959)	20 francs	obverse	1802–1814
Napoleon Bonaparte	1769–1821	Provisional Consul of France (November 10 – December 12, 1799); First Consul of France (1799–1804); Emperor of the French (1st reign: 1804–1814; 2nd reign: March 20 – June 22, 1815)	Franc (1795–1959)	40 francs	obverse	1802–1813

Person	Years of Birth/Death	Reason for Honor	Currency	Denomination	Obverse or Reverse	Years of circulation
Louis XVIII	1755–1824	King of France (1st reign: 1814–1815; 2nd reign: 1815–1824)	Franc (1795–1959)	¼ franc	obverse	1817–1824
Louis XVIII	1755–1824	King of France (1st reign: 1814–1815; 2nd reign: 1815–1824)	Franc (1795–1959)	½ franc	obverse	1816–1824
Louis XVIII	1755–1824	King of France (1st reign: 1814–1815; 2nd reign: 1815–1824)	Franc (1795–1959)	1 franc	obverse	1816–1824
Louis XVIII	1755–1824	King of France (1st reign: 1814–1815; 2nd reign: 1815–1824)	Franc (1795–1959)	2 francs	obverse	1816–1824
Louis XVIII	1755–1824	King of France (1st reign: 1814–1815; 2nd reign: 1815–1824)	Franc (1795–1959)	5 francs	obverse	1816–1824
Louis XVIII	1755–1824	King of France (1st reign: 1814–1815; 2nd reign: 1815–1824)	Franc (1795–1959)	20 francs	obverse	1814–1824
Louis XVIII	1755–1824	King of France (1st reign: 1814–1815; 2nd reign: 1815–1824)	Franc (1795–1959)	40 francs	obverse	1816–1824

Person	Years of Birth/Death	Reason for Honor	Currency	Denomination	Obverse or Reverse	Years of circulation
Charles X	1757–1836	King of France (1824–1830)	Franc (1795–1959)	¼ franc	obverse	1825–1830
Charles X	1757–1836	King of France (1824–1830)	Franc (1795–1959)	½ franc	obverse	1825–1830
Charles X	1757–1836	King of France (1824–1830)	Franc (1795–1959)	1 franc	obverse	1825–1830
Charles X	1757–1836	King of France (1824–1830)	Franc (1795–1959)	2 francs	obverse	1825–1830
Charles X	1757–1836	King of France (1824–1830)	Franc (1795–1959)	5 francs	obverse	1824–1830
Charles X	1757–1836	King of France (1824–1830)	Franc (1795–1959)	20 francs	obverse	1824–1830
Charles X	1757–1836	King of France (1824–1830)	Franc (1795–1959)	40 francs	obverse	1824–1830

Person	Years of Birth/Death	Reason for Honor	Currency	Denomination	Obverse or Reverse	Years of circulation
Louis Philippe I	1773–1850	King of France (1830–1848)	Franc (1795–1959)	¼ franc	obverse	1831–1845
Louis Philippe I	1773–1850	King of France (1830–1848)	Franc (1795–1959)	25 centimes	obverse	1845–1848
Louis Philippe I	1773–1850	King of France (1830–1848)	Franc (1795–1959)	½ franc	obverse	1831–1845
Louis Philippe I	1773–1850	King of France (1830–1848)	Franc (1795–1959)	50 centimes	obverse	1845–1848
Louis Philippe I	1773–1850	King of France (1830–1848)	Franc (1795–1959)	1 franc	obverse	1831–1848
Louis Philippe I	1773–1850	King of France (1830–1848)	Franc (1795–1959)	2 francs	obverse	1831–1848
Louis Philippe I	1773–1850	King of France (1830–1848)	Franc (1795–1959)	5 francs	obverse	1830–1848
Louis Philippe I	1773–1850	King of France (1830–1848)	Franc (1795–1959)	20 francs	obverse	1830–1848
Louis Philippe I	1773–1850	King of France (1830–1848)	Franc (1795–1959)	40 francs	obverse	1831–1839

Person	Years of Birth/Death	Reason for Honor	Currency	Denomination	Obverse or Reverse	Years of circulation
Napoleon III	1808–1873	President of France (1848–1852); Emperor of the French (1852–1870)	Franc (1795–1959)	1 centime	obverse	1853–1870
Napoleon III	1808–1873	President of France (1848–1852); Emperor of the French (1852–1870)	Franc (1795–1959)	2 centimes	obverse	1853–1862
Napoleon III	1808–1873	President of France (1848–1852); Emperor of the French (1852–1870)	Franc (1795–1959)	5 centimes	obverse	1853–1865
Napoleon III	1808–1873	President of France (1848–1852); Emperor of the French (1852–1870)	Franc (1795–1959)	10 centimes	obverse	1852–1868
Napoleon III	1808–1873	President of France (1848–1852); Emperor of the French (1852–1870)	Franc (1795–1959)	20 centimes	obverse	1853–1863
Napoleon III	1808–1873	President of France (1848–1852); Emperor of the French (1852–1870)	Franc (1795–1959)	20 centimes	obverse	1864–1868
Napoleon III	1808–1873	President of France (1848–1852); Emperor of the French (1852–1870)	Franc (1795–1959)	50 centimes	obverse	1853–1869
Napoleon III	1808–1873	President of France (1848–1852); Emperor of the French (1852–1870)	Franc (1795–1959)	1 franc	obverse	1853–1870
Napoleon III	1808–1873	President of France (1848–1852); Emperor of the French (1852–1870)	Franc (1795–1959)	2 francs	obverse	1853–1870
Napoleon III	1808–1873	President of France (1848–1852); Emperor of the French (1852–1870)	Franc (1795–1959)	5 francs	obverse	1853–1859
Napoleon III	1808–1873	President of France (1848–1852); Emperor of the French (1852–1870)	Franc (1795–1959)	5 francs	obverse	1854–1860
Napoleon III	1808–1873	President of France (1848–1852); Emperor of the French (1852–1870)	Franc (1795–1959)	5 francs	obverse	1861–1870
Napoleon III	1808–1873	President of France (1848–1852); Emperor of the French (1852–1870)	Franc (1795–1959)	5 francs	obverse	1862–1869
Napoleon III	1808–1873	President of France (1848–1852); Emperor of the French (1852–1870)	Franc (1795–1959)	10 francs	obverse	1854–1868
Napoleon III	1808–1873	President of France (1848–1852); Emperor of the French (1852–1870)	Franc (1795–1959)	20 francs	obverse	1853–1860
Napoleon III	1808–1873	President of France (1848–1852); Emperor of the French (1852–1870)	Franc (1795–1959)	20 francs	obverse	1861–1870
Napoleon III	1808–1873	President of France (1848–1852); Emperor of the French (1852–1870)	Franc (1795–1959)	50 francs	obverse	1855–1868
Napoleon III	1808–1873	President of France (1848–1852); Emperor of the French (1852–1870)	Franc (1795–1959)	100 francs	obverse	1855–1870

Person	Years of Birth/Death	Reason for Honor	Currency	Denomination	Obverse or Reverse	Years of circulation
Philippe Pétain	1856–1951	Chief of the French State (1940–1944)	Franc (1795–1959)	5 francs	obverse	1941

=== Germany ===
Currency/Subdivision: Reichsmark (ℛℳ, 1924–1945)/Reichspfennig (rpf., 1/100)
Currency/Subdivision: Deutsche Mark (DM, 1948–2002)/Pfennig (Pf., 1/100)
Currency Code: DEM
See also German mark and Reichsmark.

Person	Years of Birth/Death	Reason for Honor	Currency	Denomination	Obverse or Reverse	Years of Circulation
Paul von Hindenburg	1847–1934	2nd president of Germany (1925–1934)	Reichsmark	5 ℛℳ	obverse	1935–1945
Konrad Adenauer	1876–1967	1st chancellor of West Germany (1949–1963)	Deutsche Mark	2 DM	reverse	1969–1987
Willy Brandt	1913–1992	4th chancellor of West Germany (1999–1974)	Deutsche Mark	2 DM	reverse	1969–1987
Ludwig Erhard	1897–1977	2nd chancellor of West Germany (1963–1966)	Deutsche Mark	2 DM	reverse	1988–2001
Theodor Heuss	1884–1963	1st president of the Federal Republic of Germany (1949–1959)	Deutsche Mark	2 DM	reverse	1970–1987
Max Planck	1858–1947	Winner of the Nobel Prize in Physics (1918)	Deutsche Mark	2 DM	reverse	1957–1971
Albert Schweitzer	1875–1965	Winner of the Nobel Peace Prize (1952)	Deutsche Mark	5 DM	reverse	1975
Kurt Schumacher	1895–1952	Leader of the Social Democratic Party of Germany (1945–1952)	Deutsche Mark	2 DM	reverse	1979–2001
Franz Josef Strauß	1915–1988	Prime Minister of Bavaria (1978–1988)	Deutsche Mark	2 DM	reverse	1990–1994

=== Greece ===
Currency/Subdivision: Drachma (Δρ., 1832–2001)/Lepto (n/a, 1/100)
Currency Code: GRD
See also Greek drachma.

Person	Years of Birth/Death	Reason for Honor	Currency	Denomination	Obverse or Reverse	Years of Circulation
Alexander the Great	356 BC-323 BC	King of Macedon (336 BC-323 BC)	Drachma	100 Δρ.	obverse	1990–2002
Aristotle	384 BC-322 BC	Philosopher	Drachma	5 Δρ.	obverse	1976–2002
Markos Botsaris	1788–1823	Leader of the Greek War of Independence	Drachma	50 lepta	obverse	1976–2002
Laskarina Bouboulina	1771–1825	Heroine of the Greek War of Independence	Drachma	1 Δρ.	obverse	1988–2002
Democritus	406 BC-370 BC	Philosopher	Drachma	10 Δρ.	obverse	1976–2002
Homer	8th century BC	Poet	Drachma	50 Δρ.	obverse	1986–2002
Konstantinos Kanaris	1790–1877	Hero of the Greek War of Independence; Prime Minister of Greece (1844, 1848–1849, 1864, 1864–1865, 1877–1878)	Drachma	1 Δρ.	obverse	1976–1986
Manto Mavrogenous	1796–1840	Heroine of the Greek War of Independence	Drachma	2 Δρ.	obverse	1988–2002
Dionysios Solomos	1798–1857	Poet; wrote "Hymn to Freedom", part of the National Anthem	Drachma	2 Δρ.	obverse	1990–2002

=== Hungary ===
Currency/Subdivision: Korona (K, 1919–1926)/Fillér (1/100)
Currency/Subdivision: Pengő (P, 1927–1946)/Fillér (1/100)
Currency/Subdivision: Forint (Ft, 1946–Present)/Fillér (1/100)
Currency Code: HUF
See also Coins of the Hungarian pengő, Coins of the Hungarian forint, Hungarian pengő and Hungarian forint.

Person	Years of Birth/Death	Reason for Honor	Currency	Denomination	Obverse or Reverse	Years of Circulation
Ferenc Deák	1803–1876	Statesman and political reformer	Forint	200 Ft	obverse	1983–1995
György Dózsa	????-1514	Lead a peasants' revolt against the nobility	Forint	20 Ft	obverse	1983–1995
Miklós Horthy	1868–1957	Regent (1920–1944)	Pengő	5 P	reverse	1939–1945
Lajos Kossuth	1802–1894	Regent-President (1848–1849)	Forint	5 Ft	reverse	1946–1977
Lajos Kossuth	1802–1894	Regent-President (1848–1849)	Forint	5 Ft	reverse	1947–1977
Lajos Kossuth	1802–1894	Regent-President (1848–1849)	Forint	5 Ft	reverse	1967–1973
Lajos Kossuth	1802–1894	Regent-President (1848–1849)	Forint	5 Ft	obverse	1971–1995
Lajos Kossuth	1802–1894	Regent-President (1848–1849)	Forint	5 Ft	obverse	1983–1995
Mary	1st century BC-1st century AD	Mother of Jesus Christ	Pengő	2 P	reverse	1930–1942
Jesus	1 BC-33 AD	The Christ	Pengő	2 P	reverse	1930–1942

=== India (British Raj) ===
Currency/Subdivision: Rupee
See also Indian rupee.

Person	Years of Birth/Death	Reason for Honor	Currency	Denomination	Obverse or Reverse	Years of Circulation
William IV	1765–1837	King of the United Kingdom (1830–1837)	Rupee	1/4 rupee	obverse	1835
William IV	1765–1837	King of the United Kingdom (1830–1837)	Rupee	1/2 rupee	obverse	1835
William IV	1765–1837	King of the United Kingdom (1830–1837)	Rupee	1 rupee	obverse	1835
William IV	1765–1837	King of the United Kingdom (1830–1837)	Rupee	1 mohur	obverse	1835
William IV	1765–1837	King of the United Kingdom (1830–1837)	Rupee	2 mohurs	obverse	1835
Victoria	1819–1901	Queen of the United Kingdom of Great Britain and Ireland (1837–1901); Empress of India (1876–1901)	Rupee	2 annas	obverse	1841–1849
Victoria	1819–1901	Queen of the United Kingdom of Great Britain and Ireland (1837–1901); Empress of India (1876–1901)	Rupee	1/4 rupee	obverse	1840
Victoria	1819–1901	Queen of the United Kingdom of Great Britain and Ireland (1837–1901); Empress of India (1876–1901)	Rupee	1/2 rupee	obverse	1840–1849
Victoria	1819–1901	Queen of the United Kingdom of Great Britain and Ireland (1837–1901); Empress of India (1876–1901)	Rupee	1 rupee	obverse	1840–1849
Victoria	1819–1901	Queen of the United Kingdom of Great Britain and Ireland (1837–1901); Empress of India (1876–1901)	Rupee	1 mohur	obverse	1841
Victoria	1819–1901	Queen of the United Kingdom of Great Britain and Ireland (1837–1901); Empress of India (1876–1901)	Rupee	1/12 anna	obverse	1861–1901
Victoria	1819–1901	Queen of the United Kingdom of Great Britain and Ireland (1837–1901); Empress of India (1876–1901)	Rupee	1/2 pice	obverse	1862–1901
Victoria	1819–1901	Queen of the United Kingdom of Great Britain and Ireland (1837–1901); Empress of India (1876–1901)	Rupee	1/4 anna	obverse	1862–1901
Victoria	1819–1901	Queen of the United Kingdom of Great Britain and Ireland (1837–1901); Empress of India (1876–1901)	Rupee	1/2 anna	obverse	1862–1893
Victoria	1819–1901	Queen of the United Kingdom of Great Britain and Ireland (1837–1901); Empress of India (1876–1901)	Rupee	2 annas	obverse	1862–1901
Victoria	1819–1901	Queen of the United Kingdom of Great Britain and Ireland (1837–1901); Empress of India (1876–1901)	Rupee	1/4 rupee	obverse	1862–1901
Victoria	1819–1901	Queen of the United Kingdom of Great Britain and Ireland (1837–1901); Empress of India (1876–1901)	Rupee	1/2 rupee	obverse	1862–1899
Victoria	1819–1901	Queen of the United Kingdom of Great Britain and Ireland (1837–1901); Empress of India (1876–1901)	Rupee	1 rupee	obverse	1862–1901
Victoria	1819–1901	Queen of the United Kingdom of Great Britain and Ireland (1837–1901); Empress of India (1876–1901)	Rupee	5 rupees	obverse	1870–1879
Victoria	1819–1901	Queen of the United Kingdom of Great Britain and Ireland (1837–1901); Empress of India (1876–1901)	Rupee	10 rupees	obverse	1870–1879
Victoria	1819–1901	Queen of the United Kingdom of Great Britain and Ireland (1837–1901); Empress of India (1876–1901)	Rupee	1 mohur	obverse	1862–1891

Person	Years of Birth/Death	Reason for Honor	Currency	Denomination	Obverse or Reverse	Years of Circulation
Edward VII	1841–1910	King of the United Kingdom and the British Dominions (1901–1910); Emperor of India (1901–1910)	Rupee	1/12 anna	obverse	1903–1910
Edward VII	1841–1910	King of the United Kingdom and the British Dominions (1901–1910); Emperor of India (1901–1910)	Rupee	1/2 pice	obverse	1903–1910
Edward VII	1841–1910	King of the United Kingdom and the British Dominions (1901–1910); Emperor of India (1901–1910)	Rupee	1/4 anna	obverse	1903–1910
Edward VII	1841–1910	King of the United Kingdom and the British Dominions (1901–1910); Emperor of India (1901–1910)	Rupee	1 anna	obverse	1906–1910
Edward VII	1841–1910	King of the United Kingdom and the British Dominions (1901–1910); Emperor of India (1901–1910)	Rupee	2 annas	obverse	1903–1910
Edward VII	1841–1910	King of the United Kingdom and the British Dominions (1901–1910); Emperor of India (1901–1910)	Rupee	1/4 rupee	obverse	1903–1910
Edward VII	1841–1910	King of the United Kingdom and the British Dominions (1901–1910); Emperor of India (1901–1910)	Rupee	1/2 rupee	obverse	1905–1910
Edward VII	1841–1910	King of the United Kingdom and the British Dominions (1901–1910); Emperor of India (1901–1910)	Rupee	1 rupee	obverse	1903–1910

Person	Years of Birth/Death	Reason for Honor	Currency	Denomination	Obverse or Reverse	Years of Circulation
George V	1865–1936	King of the United Kingdom and the British Dominions (1910–1936); Emperor of India (1910–1936)	Rupee	1/12 anna	obverse	1912–1936
George V	1865–1936	King of the United Kingdom and the British Dominions (1910–1936); Emperor of India (1910–1936)	Rupee	1/2 pice	obverse	1912–1936
George V	1865–1936	King of the United Kingdom and the British Dominions (1910–1936); Emperor of India (1910–1936)	Rupee	1/4 anna	obverse	1911–1936
George V	1865–1936	King of the United Kingdom and the British Dominions (1910–1936); Emperor of India (1910–1936)	Rupee	1 anna	obverse	1912–1936
George V	1865–1936	King of the United Kingdom and the British Dominions (1910–1936); Emperor of India (1910–1936)	Rupee	2 annas	obverse	1911–1917
George V	1865–1936	King of the United Kingdom and the British Dominions (1910–1936); Emperor of India (1910–1936)	Rupee	2 annas	obverse	1918–1936
George V	1865–1936	King of the United Kingdom and the British Dominions (1910–1936); Emperor of India (1910–1936)	Rupee	1/4 rupee	obverse	1911–1936
George V	1865–1936	King of the United Kingdom and the British Dominions (1910–1936); Emperor of India (1910–1936)	Rupee	4 annas	obverse	1919–1921
George V	1865–1936	King of the United Kingdom and the British Dominions (1910–1936); Emperor of India (1910–1936)	Rupee	1/2 rupee	obverse	1911–1936
George V	1865–1936	King of the United Kingdom and the British Dominions (1910–1936); Emperor of India (1910–1936)	Rupee	8 annas	obverse	1919–1920
George V	1865–1936	King of the United Kingdom and the British Dominions (1910–1936); Emperor of India (1910–1936)	Rupee	1 rupee	obverse	1911–1936
George V	1865–1936	King of the United Kingdom and the British Dominions (1910–1936); Emperor of India (1910–1936)	Rupee	15 rupees	obverse	1918

Person	Years of Birth/Death	Reason for Honor	Currency	Denomination	Obverse or Reverse	Years of Circulation
George VI	1895–1952	King of the United Kingdom and the British Dominions (1936–1952); last Emperor of India (1936–1947)	Rupee	1/12 anna	obverse	1938–1942
George VI	1895–1952	King of the United Kingdom and the British Dominions (1936–1952); last Emperor of India (1936–1947)	Rupee	1/2 pice	obverse	1938–1942
George VI	1895–1952	King of the United Kingdom and the British Dominions (1936–1952); last Emperor of India (1936–1947)	Rupee	1/4 anna	obverse	1938–1942
George VI	1895–1952	King of the United Kingdom and the British Dominions (1936–1952); last Emperor of India (1936–1947)	Rupee	1/2 anna	obverse	1940–1947
George VI	1895–1952	King of the United Kingdom and the British Dominions (1936–1952); last Emperor of India (1936–1947)	Rupee	1 anna	obverse	1938–1947
George VI	1895–1952	King of the United Kingdom and the British Dominions (1936–1952); last Emperor of India (1936–1947)	Rupee	2 annas	obverse	1939–1947
George VI	1895–1952	King of the United Kingdom and the British Dominions (1936–1952); last Emperor of India (1936–1947)	Rupee	1/4 rupee	obverse	1938–1947
George VI	1895–1952	King of the United Kingdom and the British Dominions (1936–1952); last Emperor of India (1936–1947)	Rupee	1/2 rupee	obverse	1938–1947
George VI	1895–1952	King of the United Kingdom and the British Dominions (1936–1952); last Emperor of India (1936–1947)	Rupee	1 rupee	obverse	1938–1947

=== Jordan ===
Currency/Subdivision: Dinar (1949–Present)/Qirsh or Piastre (1/100) and Fils (1/1000)
Currency Code: JOD
See also Jordanian dinar.

Person	Years of Birth/Death	Reason for Honor	Currency	Denomination	Obverse or Reverse	Years of Circulation
Hussein	1935–1999	King of Jordan (1952–1999)	Dinar	1 fils	reverse	1968–1984
Hussein	1935–1999	King of Jordan (1952–1999)	Dinar	1 fils	reverse	1984–1985
Hussein	1935–1999	King of Jordan (1952–1999)	Dinar	5 fils	reverse	1968–1978
Hussein	1935–1999	King of Jordan (1952–1999)	Dinar	5 fils	reverse	1978–1996
Hussein	1935–1999	King of Jordan (1952–1999)	Dinar	10 fils	reverse	1968–1978
Hussein	1935–1999	King of Jordan (1952–1999)	Dinar	10 fils	reverse	1978–1994
Hussein	1935–1999	King of Jordan (1952–1999)	Dinar	25 fils	reverse	1968–1981
Hussein	1935–1999	King of Jordan (1952–1999)	Dinar	25 fils	reverse	1981–1992
Hussein	1935–1999	King of Jordan (1952–1999)	Dinar	50 fils	reverse	1968–1978
Hussein	1935–1999	King of Jordan (1952–1999)	Dinar	50 fils	reverse	1978–1992
Hussein	1935–1999	King of Jordan (1952–1999)	Dinar	100 fils	reverse	1968–1978
Hussein	1935–1999	King of Jordan (1952–1999)	Dinar	100 fils	reverse	1978–1992
Hussein	1935–1999	King of Jordan (1952–1999)	Dinar	¼ dinar	reverse	1970–1978
Hussein	1935–1999	King of Jordan (1952–1999)	Dinar	¼ dinar	reverse	1978–1996

=== Kenya ===
Currency/Subdivision: Shilling (1966–Present)/Cent (1/100)
Currency Code: KES
See also Kenyan shilling.

Person	Years of Birth/Death	Reason for Honor	Currency	Denomination	Obverse or Reverse	Years of Circulation
Mzee Jomo Kenyatta	1893–1978	1st Prime Minister of Kenya (1963–1964); 1st President of Kenya (1964–1978)	Shilling	5 cents	obverse	1966–1980
Mzee Jomo Kenyatta	1893–1978	1st Prime Minister of Kenya (1963–1964); 1st President of Kenya (1964–1978)	Shilling	10 cents	obverse	1966–1980
Mzee Jomo Kenyatta	1893–1978	1st Prime Minister of Kenya (1963–1964); 1st President of Kenya (1964–1978)	Shilling	25 cents	obverse	1966–1969
Mzee Jomo Kenyatta	1893–1978	1st Prime Minister of Kenya (1963–1964); 1st President of Kenya (1964–1978)	Shilling	50 cents	obverse	1966–1980
Mzee Jomo Kenyatta	1893–1978	1st Prime Minister of Kenya (1963–1964); 1st President of Kenya (1964–1978)	Shilling	1 shilling	obverse	1966–1980
Mzee Jomo Kenyatta	1893–1978	1st Prime Minister of Kenya (1963–1964); 1st President of Kenya (1964–1978)	Shilling	2 shillings	obverse	1966–1971
Daniel arap Moi	1924–2020	2nd President of Kenya (1978–2002)	Shilling	5 cents	obverse	1980–2005
Daniel arap Moi	1924–2020	2nd President of Kenya (1978–2002)	Shilling	10 cents	obverse	1980–2005
Daniel arap Moi	1924–2020	2nd President of Kenya (1978–2002)	Shilling	50 cents	obverse	1980–2005
Daniel arap Moi	1924–2020	2nd President of Kenya (1978–2002)	Shilling	1 shilling	obverse	1980–2005
Daniel arap Moi	1924–2020	2nd President of Kenya (1978–2002)	Shilling	5 shillings	obverse	1985–2005
Daniel arap Moi	1924–2020	2nd President of Kenya (1978–2002)	Shilling	10 shillings	obverse	1994–2005
Daniel arap Moi	1924–2020	2nd President of Kenya (1978–2002)	Shilling	20 shillings	obverse	1998–2005

=== Liechtenstein ===
Currency/Subdivision: Krone (1898–1921)/Heller (1/100)
Franc (Franken) (1920–present)/Centime (Rappen) (1/100)
See also Liechtenstein krone and Liechtenstein franc.

Person	Years of Birth/Death	Reason for Honor	Currency	Denomination	Obverse or Reverse	Years of Circulation
Johann II	1840–1929	Prince of Liechtenstein (1858–1929)	Liechtenstein krone	1 krone	obverse	1900–1915
Johann II	1840–1929	Prince of Liechtenstein (1858–1929)	Liechtenstein krone	2 kronen	obverse	1912–1915
Johann II	1840–1929	Prince of Liechtenstein (1858–1929)	Liechtenstein krone	5 kronen	obverse	1900–1915
Johann II	1840–1929	Prince of Liechtenstein (1858–1929)	Liechtenstein krone	10 kronen	obverse	1900
Johann II	1840–1929	Prince of Liechtenstein (1858–1929)	Liechtenstein krone	20 kronen	obverse	1898

Person	Years of Birth/Death	Reason for Honor	Currency	Denomination	Obverse or Reverse	Years of Circulation
Johann II	1840–1929	Prince of Liechtenstein (1858–1929)	Liechtenstein franc	1/2 franc	obverse	1924
Johann II	1840–1929	Prince of Liechtenstein (1858–1929)	Liechtenstein franc	1 franc	obverse	1924
Johann II	1840–1929	Prince of Liechtenstein (1858–1929)	Liechtenstein franc	2 francs	obverse	1924
Johann II	1840–1929	Prince of Liechtenstein (1858–1929)	Liechtenstein franc	5 francs	obverse	1924

Person	Years of Birth/Death	Reason for Honor	Currency	Denomination	Obverse or Reverse	Years of Circulation
Franz I	1853–1938	Prince of Liechtenstein (1929–1938)	Liechtenstein franc	10 francs	obverse	1930
Franz I	1853–1938	Prince of Liechtenstein (1929–1938)	Liechtenstein franc	20 francs	obverse	1930

Person	Years of Birth/Death	Reason for Honor	Currency	Denomination	Obverse or Reverse	Years of Circulation
Franz Joseph II	1906–1989	Prince of Liechtenstein (1938–1989)	Liechtenstein franc	10 francs	obverse	1946
Franz Joseph II	1906–1989	Prince of Liechtenstein (1938–1989)	Liechtenstein franc	20 francs	obverse	1946

=== Mexico ===
Currency/Subdivision: Peso ($, 1821–Present)/Centavo (¢, 1/100)
Currency Code: MXP (1821–1993) and MXN (1993–Present)
See also Mexican peso.

Person	Years of Birth/Death	Reason for Honor	Currency	Denomination	Obverse or Reverse	Years of Circulation
Venustiano Carranza	1859–1920	President of Mexico (1917–1920)	Peso	$5	obverse	1959–1971
Venustiano Carranza	1859–1920	President of Mexico (1917–1920)	Peso	$100	obverse	1984–1992
Miguel Domínguez	1756–1830	Conspirator and supporter of the Mexican War of Independence	Peso	10¢	obverse	1955–1976
Miguel Domínguez	1756–1830	Conspirator and supporter of the Mexican War of Independence	Peso	$1	obverse	1957-1957
Miguel Domínguez	1756–1830	Conspirator and supporter of the Mexican War of Independence	Peso	$5	obverse	1957-1957
Miguel Domínguez	1756–1830	Conspirator and supporter of the Mexican War of Independence	Peso	$10	obverse	1957-1957
Miguel Hidalgo	1753–1811	Catholic priest; chief leader of the Mexican War of Independence	Peso	$5	obverse	1955–1959
Miguel Hidalgo	1753–1811	Catholic priest; chief leader of the Mexican War of Independence	Peso	$10	obverse	1955–1956
Miguel Hidalgo	1753–1811	Catholic priest; chief leader of the Mexican War of Independence	Peso	$10	obverse	1960–1974
Miguel Hidalgo	1753–1811	Catholic priest; chief leader of the Mexican War of Independence	Peso	$10	obverse	1978–1985
Miguel Hidalgo	1753–1811	Catholic priest; chief leader of the Mexican War of Independence	Peso	$10	obverse	1985–1990
Benito Juárez	1806–1872	President of Mexico (1858–1872)	Peso	$25	obverse	1972–1982
Benito Juárez	1806–1872	President of Mexico (1858–1872)	Peso	$50	obverse	1984–1992
José María Morelos	1765–1815	General and leader in the Mexican War of Independence	Peso	$1	obverse	1947–1987
José María Morelos	1765–1815	General and leader in the Mexican War of Independence	Peso	$100	obverse	1977–1979
Josefa Ortiz de Domínguez	1768–1829	Conspirator and supporter of the Mexican War of Independence	Peso	5¢	obverse	1942–1976
Francisco I. Madero	1873–1913	President of Mexico (1911–1913)	Peso	20¢	obverse	1974–1983
Francisco I. Madero	1873–1913	President of Mexico (1911–1913)	Peso	25¢	obverse	1964–1966
Francisco I. Madero	1873–1913	President of Mexico (1911–1913)	Peso	$10	obverse	1960–1974
Guadalupe Victoria	1786–1843	President of Mexico (1824–1829)	Peso	$20	obverse	1985–1990

=== Monaco ===
Currency: Monégasque franc (1837–1995)/Subdivision: Centime (1/100)
See also Monégasque franc.

Person	Years of Birth/Death	Reason for Honor	Currency	Denomination	Obverse or Reverse	Years of circulation
Honoré V	1778–1841	Prince of Monaco (1819–1841)	Monégasque franc (Ancien franc)	5 centimes	obverse	1837–1838
Honoré V	1778–1841	Prince of Monaco (1819–1841)	Monégasque franc (Ancien franc)	1 decime	obverse	1838

Person	Years of Birth/Death	Reason for Honor	Currency	Denomination	Obverse or Reverse	Years of circulation
Charles III	1818–1889	Prince of Monaco (1856–1889); founder of the Monte Carlo Casino	Monégasque franc (Ancien franc)	20 francs	obverse	1878–1879
Charles III	1818–1889	Prince of Monaco (1856–1889); founder of the Monte Carlo Casino	Monégasque franc (Ancien franc)	100 francs	obverse	1882–1886

Person	Years of Birth/Death	Reason for Honor	Currency	Denomination	Obverse or Reverse	Years of circulation
Albert I	1848–1922	Prince of Monaco (1889–1922)	Monégasque franc (Ancien franc)	100 francs	obverse	1891–1904

Person	Years of Birth/Death	Reason for Honor	Currency	Denomination	Obverse or Reverse	Years of circulation
Louis II	1870–1949	Prince of Monaco (1922–1949)	Monégasque franc (Ancien franc)	1 franc	obverse	1943–1945
Louis II	1870–1949	Prince of Monaco (1922–1949)	Monégasque franc (Ancien franc)	2 francs	obverse	1943–1945
Louis II	1870–1949	Prince of Monaco (1922–1949)	Monégasque franc (Ancien franc)	5 francs	obverse	1945
Louis II	1870–1949	Prince of Monaco (1922–1949)	Monégasque franc (Ancien franc)	10 francs	obverse	1946
Louis II	1870–1949	Prince of Monaco (1922–1949)	Monégasque franc (Ancien franc)	20 francs	obverse	1947

Person	Years of Birth/Death	Reason for Honor	Currency	Denomination	Obverse or Reverse	Years of circulation
Rainier III	1923–2005	Prince of Monaco (1940–2005)	Monégasque franc (Ancien franc)	10 francs	obverse	1950–1951
Rainier III	1923–2005	Prince of Monaco (1940–2005)	Monégasque franc (Ancien franc)	20 francs	obverse	1950–1951
Rainier III	1923–2005	Prince of Monaco (1940–2005)	Monégasque franc (Ancien franc)	50 francs	obverse	1950
Rainier III	1923–2005	Prince of Monaco (1940–2005)	Monégasque franc (Ancien franc)	100 francs	obverse	1950
Rainier III	1923–2005	Prince of Monaco (1940–2005)	Monégasque franc (Ancien franc)	100 francs	obverse	1956

Person	Years of Birth/Death	Reason for Honor	Currency	Denomination	Obverse or Reverse	Years of circulation
Rainier III	1923–2005	Prince of Monaco (1940–2005)	Monégasque franc (Nouveau franc)	5 centimes	obverse	1962–1995
Rainier III	1923–2005	Prince of Monaco (1940–2005)	Monégasque franc (Nouveau franc)	10 centimes	obverse	1962–1995
Rainier III	1923–2005	Prince of Monaco (1940–2005)	Monégasque franc (Nouveau franc)	20 centimes	obverse	1962–1995
Rainier III	1923–2005	Prince of Monaco (1940–2005)	Monégasque franc (Nouveau franc)	50 centimes	obverse	1962
Rainier III	1923–2005	Prince of Monaco (1940–2005)	Monégasque franc (Nouveau franc)	½ franc	obverse	1965–1995
Rainier III	1923–2005	Prince of Monaco (1940–2005)	Monégasque franc (Nouveau franc)	1 franc	obverse	1960–1995
Rainier III	1923–2005	Prince of Monaco (1940–2005)	Monégasque franc (Nouveau franc)	2 francs	obverse	1979–1995
Rainier III	1923–2005	Prince of Monaco (1940–2005)	Monégasque franc (Nouveau franc)	5 francs	obverse	1960–1966
Rainier III	1923–2005	Prince of Monaco (1940–2005)	Monégasque franc (Nouveau franc)	5 francs	obverse	1971–1995
Rainier III	1923–2005	Prince of Monaco (1940–2005)	Monégasque franc (Nouveau franc)	10 francs	obverse	1975–1982

=== Morocco ===
Currency/Subdivision: Dirham (1882–Present)/Santim (1/100)
Currency Code: MAD
See also Moroccan dirham.

Person	Years of Birth/Death	Reason for Honor	Currency	Denomination	Obverse or Reverse	Years of Circulation
Hassan II	1929–1999	King of Morocco (1961–1999)	Dirham	20 santimat	obverse	1974–1987
Hassan II	1929–1999	King of Morocco (1961–1999)	Dirham	50 santimat	obverse	1974–1987
Hassan II	1929–1999	King of Morocco (1961–1999)	Dirham	½ dirham	obverse	1987–2002
Hassan II	1929–1999	King of Morocco (1961–1999)	Dirham	1 dirham	obverse	1965–1974
Hassan II	1929–1999	King of Morocco (1961–1999)	Dirham	1 dirham	obverse	1974–1987
Hassan II	1929–1999	King of Morocco (1961–1999)	Dirham	1 dirham	obverse	1987–2002
Hassan II	1929–1999	King of Morocco (1961–1999)	Dirham	5 dirhams	obverse	1980–1987

=== Netherlands ===
Currency/Subdivision: Gulden (ƒ, 1817–2002)/Cent (ct., 1/100)
Currency Code: NLG
See also Dutch gulden.

Person	Years of Birth/Death	Reason for Honor	Currency	Denomination	Obverse or Reverse	Years of Circulation
Beatrix	1938–	Queen of the Netherlands (1980–2013)	Gulden	5 ct.	obverse	1982–2001
Beatrix	1938–	Queen of the Netherlands (1980–2013)	Gulden	10 ct.	obverse	1982–2001
Beatrix	1938–	Queen of the Netherlands (1980–2013)	Gulden	25 ct.	obverse	1982–2001
Beatrix	1938–	Queen of the Netherlands (1980–2013)	Gulden	1 ƒ	obverse	1982–2001
Beatrix	1938–	Queen of the Netherlands (1980–2013)	Gulden	21/2 ƒ	obverse	1982–2001
Beatrix	1938–	Queen of the Netherlands (1980–2013)	Gulden	5 ƒ	obverse	1987–2001

=== Newfoundland, Dominion of ===
Currency/Subdivision: Dollar ($/NF$, 1865–1949)/Cent (¢ 1/100)
See also Newfoundland dollar.

Person	Years of Birth/Death	Reason for Honor	Currency	Denomination	Obverse or Reverse	Years of Circulation
Victoria	1819–1901	Queen of the United Kingdom of Great Britain and Ireland (1837–1901)	Dollar	1 cent	obverse	1865–1896
Victoria	1819–1901	Queen of the United Kingdom of Great Britain and Ireland (1837–1901)	Dollar	5 cents	obverse	1865–1896
Victoria	1819–1901	Queen of the United Kingdom of Great Britain and Ireland (1837–1901)	Dollar	10 cents	obverse	1865–1896
Victoria	1819–1901	Queen of the United Kingdom of Great Britain and Ireland (1837–1901)	Dollar	20 cents	obverse	1865–1900
Victoria	1819–1901	Queen of the United Kingdom of Great Britain and Ireland (1837–1901)	Dollar	50 cents	obverse	1870–1900
Victoria	1819–1901	Queen of the United Kingdom of Great Britain and Ireland (1837–1901)	Dollar	2 dollars	obverse	1865–1888
Edward VII	1841–1910	King of the United Kingdom and the British Dominions (1901–1910); Emperor of India (1901–1910)	Dollar	1 cent	obverse	1904–1909
Edward VII	1841–1910	King of the United Kingdom and the British Dominions (1901–1910); Emperor of India (1901–1910)	Dollar	5 cents	obverse	1903–1908
Edward VII	1841–1910	King of the United Kingdom and the British Dominions (1901–1910); Emperor of India (1901–1910)	Dollar	10 cents	obverse	1903–1904
Edward VII	1841–1910	King of the United Kingdom and the British Dominions (1901–1910); Emperor of India (1901–1910)	Dollar	20 cents	obverse	1904
Edward VII	1841–1910	King of the United Kingdom and the British Dominions (1901–1910); Emperor of India (1901–1910)	Dollar	50 cents	obverse	1904–1909
George V	1865–1936	King of the United Kingdom and the British Dominions (1910–1936); Emperor of India (1910–1936)	Dollar	1 cent	obverse	1913–1936
George V	1865–1936	King of the United Kingdom and the British Dominions (1910–1936); Emperor of India (1910–1936)	Dollar	5 cents	obverse	1912–1929
George V	1865–1936	King of the United Kingdom and the British Dominions (1910–1936); Emperor of India (1910–1936)	Dollar	10 cents	obverse	1912–1919
George V	1865–1936	King of the United Kingdom and the British Dominions (1910–1936); Emperor of India (1910–1936)	Dollar	20 cents	obverse	1912
George V	1865–1936	King of the United Kingdom and the British Dominions (1910–1936); Emperor of India (1910–1936)	Dollar	25 cents	obverse	1917–1919
George V	1865–1936	King of the United Kingdom and the British Dominions (1910–1936); Emperor of India (1910–1936)	Dollar	50 cents	obverse	1911–1919
George VI	1895–1952	King of the United Kingdom and the British Dominions (1936–1952); Emperor of India (1936–1947)	Dollar	1 cent	obverse	1938–1947
George VI	1895–1952	King of the United Kingdom and the British Dominions (1936–1952); Emperor of India (1936–1947)	Dollar	5 cents	obverse	1938–1947
George VI	1895–1952	King of the United Kingdom and the British Dominions (1936–1952); Emperor of India (1936–1947)	Dollar	10 cents	obverse	1938–1947

=== New Zealand ===
Currency/Subdivision: Pound (£, 1840–1967)/Penny (d, 1/240)
Currency/Subdivision: Dollar ($, 1967–Present)/Cent (c, 1/100)
Currency Code: NZD
See also New Zealand pound, New Zealand dollar and Coins of the New Zealand dollar.

Person	Years of Birth/Death	Reason for Honor	Currency	Denomination	Obverse or Reverse	Years of Circulation
Elizabeth II	1926–2022	Queen of the United Kingdom (1952–2022)	Pound	1/2d	obverse	1940–1967
Elizabeth II	1926–2022	Queen of the United Kingdom (1952–2022)	Pound	1d	obverse	1940–1967
Elizabeth II	1926–2022	Queen of the United Kingdom (1952–2022)	Pound	3d	obverse	1933–1967
Elizabeth II	1926–2022	Queen of the United Kingdom (1952–2022)	Pound	6d	obverse	1933–1967
Elizabeth II	1926–2022	Queen of the United Kingdom (1952–2022)	Pound	12d (1/- or 1 shilling)	obverse	1933–1967
Elizabeth II	1926–2022	Queen of the United Kingdom (1952–2022)	Pound	24d (2/- or 1 florin)	obverse	1933–1967
Elizabeth II	1926–2022	Queen of the United Kingdom (1952–2022)	Pound	30d (21/2/- or 1/2 crown)	obverse	1933–1967
Elizabeth II	1926–2022	Queen of the United Kingdom (1952–2022)	Dollar	1c	obverse	1967–1990
Elizabeth II	1926–2022	Queen of the United Kingdom (1952–2022)	Dollar	2c	obverse	1967–1990
Elizabeth II	1926–2022	Queen of the United Kingdom (1952–2022)	Dollar	5c	obverse	1967–2006
Elizabeth II	1926–2022	Queen of the United Kingdom (1952–2022)	Dollar	10c	obverse	1967–2006
Elizabeth II	1926–2022	Queen of the United Kingdom (1952–2022)	Dollar	20c	obverse	1967–2006
Elizabeth II	1926–2022	Queen of the United Kingdom (1952–2022)	Dollar	50c	obverse	1967–2006

=== Nigeria ===
Currency/Subdivision: Pounds (£, 1959–1973)/Shilling (/-, 1/20) and pence (d, 1/240)
Currency/Subdivision: Naira (₦, 1973–Present)/Kobo (1/100)
Currency Code: GBP, NGN
See also Nigerian pound and Nigerian naira.

Person	Years of Birth/Death	Reason for Honor	Currency	Denomination	Obverse or Reverse	Years of Circulation
Elizabeth II	1926–2022	Queen of the United Kingdom (1952–2022)	Pound	3d	obverse	1959–1973
Elizabeth II	1926–2022	Queen of the United Kingdom (1952–2022)	Pound	6d	obverse	1959–1973
Elizabeth II	1926–2022	Queen of the United Kingdom (1952–2022)	Pound	1/-	obverse	1959–1973
Elizabeth II	1926–2022	Queen of the United Kingdom (1952–2022)	Pound	2/-	obverse	1959–1973
Herbert Macaulay	1864–1946	National leader in colonial Nigeria	Naira	₦1	obverse	1979–1984

=== Romania ===
Currency/Subdivision: Romanian leu (L, 1867–Present)/ban (b, 1/100)
Currency Code: ROL
See also Romanian leu.

Person	Years of Birth/Death	Reason for Honor	Currency	Denomination	Obverse or Reverse	Years of Circulation
Carol I	1839–1914	Domnitor (1866–1881); King of Romania (1881–1914)	Romanian leu	1 L	both	1905–1910
Carol I	1839–1914	Domnitor (1866–1881); King of Romania (1881–1914)	Romanian leu	5 L	both	1905–1910
Carol I	1839–1914	Domnitor (1866–1881); King of Romania (1881–1914)	Romanian leu	50 b	reverse	1910–1914
Carol I	1839–1914	Domnitor (1866–1881); King of Romania (1881–1914)	Romanian leu	1 L	reverse	1910–1914
Carol I	1839–1914	Domnitor (1866–1881); King of Romania (1881–1914)	Romanian leu	2 L	reverse	1910–1914
Michael I	1921–2017	King (1st reign: 1927–1930)	Romanian leu	5 L	reverse	1930
Michael I	1921–2017	King (1st reign: 1927–1930)	Romanian leu	20 L	reverse	1930
Carol II	1893–1953	King of Romania (1930–1940)	Romanian leu	10 L	reverse	1930–1932
Carol II	1893–1953	King of Romania (1930–1940)	Romanian leu	20 L	reverse	1930–1932
Carol II	1893–1953	King of Romania (1930–1940)	Romanian leu	100 L	reverse	1932–1936
Carol II	1893–1953	King of Romania (1930–1940)	Romanian leu	250 L	reverse	1932–1936
Carol II	1893–1953	King of Romania (1930–1940)	Romanian leu	50 L	reverse	1936–1942
Carol II	1893–1953	King of Romania (1930–1940)	Romanian leu	100 L	reverse	1936–1942
Michael I	1921–2017	King (2nd reign: 1940–1947)	Romanian leu	200 L	reverse	1942–1944
Michael I	1921–2017	King (2nd reign: 1940–1947)	Romanian leu	200 L	reverse	1944–1945
Michael I	1921–2017	King (2nd reign: 1940–1947)	Romanian leu	250 L	reverse	1941–1944
Michael I	1921–2017	King (2nd reign: 1940–1947)	Romanian leu	500 L	reverse	1941
Michael I	1921–2017	King (2nd reign: 1940–1947)	Romanian leu	500 L	reverse	1944–1945
Michael I	1921–2017	King (2nd reign: 1940–1947)	Romanian leu	500 L	reverse	1945–1946
Michael I	1921–2017	King (2nd reign: 1940–1947)	Romanian leu	500 L	reverse	1946–1947
Michael I	1921–2017	King (2nd reign: 1940–1947)	Romanian leu	100 L	reverse	1944–1947
Michael I	1921–2017	King (2nd reign: 1940–1947)	Romanian leu	2,000 L	reverse	1946–1947
Michael I	1921–2017	King (2nd reign: 1940–1947)	Romanian leu	25,000 L	reverse	1946–1947
Michael I	1921–2017	King (2nd reign: 1940–1947)	Romanian leu	100,000 L	reverse	1946–1947
Michael I	1921–2017	King (2nd reign: 1940–1947)	Romanian leu	5 L	reverse	1947
Michael I	1921–2017	King (2nd reign: 1940–1947)	Romanian leu	10,000 L	reverse	1947
Ştefan cel Mare	ca. 1432–1504	Domnitor of Moldavia	Romanian leu	20 L	reverse	1991–2004
Alexandru Ioan Cuza	1820–1873	Domnitor of the Romanian Principalities	Romanian leu	50 L	reverse	1991–2004
Mihai Viteazu	1558–1601	Domnitor of Wallachia, Domnitor of Transylvania and Domnitor of Moldavia	Romanian leu	100 L	reverse	1991–2006
Constantin Brâncoveanu	1654–1714	Domnitor of Wallachia	Romanian leu	1,000 L	reverse	2000–2006

=== Sarawak, Raj of ===
Currency/Subdivision: Dollar ($, 1858–1953)/Cent (1/100)
See also Sarawak dollar.

Person	Years of Birth/Death	Reason for Honor	Currency	Denomination	Obverse or Reverse	Years of circulation
James Brooke	1803–1868	1st White Rajah of Sarawak (1842–1868)	Dollar	1/4 cent	obverse	1863
James Brooke	1803–1868	1st White Rajah of Sarawak (1842–1868)	Dollar	1/2 cent	obverse	1863
James Brooke	1803–1868	1st White Rajah of Sarawak (1842–1868)	Dollar	1 cent	obverse	1863
Charles Brooke	1829–1917	2nd White Rajah of Sarawak (1868–1917)	Dollar	1/4 cent	obverse	1870–1896
Charles Brooke	1829–1917	2nd White Rajah of Sarawak (1868–1917)	Dollar	1/2 cent	obverse	1870–1896
Charles Brooke	1829–1917	2nd White Rajah of Sarawak (1868–1917)	Dollar	1 cent	obverse	1870–1891
Charles Brooke	1829–1917	2nd White Rajah of Sarawak (1868–1917)	Dollar	1 cent	obverse	1892–1897
Charles Brooke	1829–1917	2nd White Rajah of Sarawak (1868–1917)	Dollar	5 cents	obverse	1900–1915
Charles Brooke	1829–1917	2nd White Rajah of Sarawak (1868–1917)	Dollar	10 cents	obverse	1900–1915
Charles Brooke	1829–1917	2nd White Rajah of Sarawak (1868–1917)	Dollar	20 cents	obverse	1900–1915
Charles Brooke	1829–1917	2nd White Rajah of Sarawak (1868–1917)	Dollar	50 cents	obverse	1900–1906
Charles Vyner Brooke	1874–1963	3rd and final White Rajah of Sarawak (1917–1946)	Dollar	1/2 cent	obverse	1933
Charles Vyner Brooke	1874–1963	3rd and final White Rajah of Sarawak (1917–1946)	Dollar	1 cent	obverse	1920
Charles Vyner Brooke	1874–1963	3rd and final White Rajah of Sarawak (1917–1946)	Dollar	1 cent	obverse	1927–1941
Charles Vyner Brooke	1874–1963	3rd and final White Rajah of Sarawak (1917–1946)	Dollar	5 cents	obverse	1920
Charles Vyner Brooke	1874–1963	3rd and final White Rajah of Sarawak (1917–1946)	Dollar	5 cents	obverse	1920–1927
Charles Vyner Brooke	1874–1963	3rd and final White Rajah of Sarawak (1917–1946)	Dollar	10 cents	obverse	1920
Charles Vyner Brooke	1874–1963	3rd and final White Rajah of Sarawak (1917–1946)	Dollar	10 cents	obverse	1920–1934
Charles Vyner Brooke	1874–1963	3rd and final White Rajah of Sarawak (1917–1946)	Dollar	20 cents	obverse	1920
Charles Vyner Brooke	1874–1963	3rd and final White Rajah of Sarawak (1917–1946)	Dollar	20 cents	obverse	1927
Charles Vyner Brooke	1874–1963	3rd and final White Rajah of Sarawak (1917–1946)	Dollar	50 cents	obverse	1927

=== South Africa ===
Currency/Subdivision: Pound (£, 1923–1961)/Penny (d, 1/240)
Currency/Subdivision: Rand (R, 1961–Present)/Cent (c, 1/100)
Currency Code: ZAR
See also Coins of the South African pound, Coins of the South African rand, South African rand and South African pound.

Person	Years of Birth/Death	Reason for Honor	Currency	Denomination	Obverse or Reverse	Years of Circulation
Elizabeth II	1926–2022	Queen of the United Kingdom (1952–2022)	Pound	1/4d	obverse	1953–1961
Elizabeth II	1926–2022	Queen of the United Kingdom (1952–2022)	Pound	1/2d	obverse	1953–1961
Elizabeth II	1926–2022	Queen of the United Kingdom (1952–2022)	Pound	1d	obverse	1953–1961
Elizabeth II	1926–2022	Queen of the United Kingdom (1952–2022)	Pound	3d	obverse	1953–1961
Elizabeth II	1926–2022	Queen of the United Kingdom (1952–2022)	Pound	6d	obverse	1953–1961
Elizabeth II	1926–2022	Queen of the United Kingdom (1952–2022)	Pound	1/- (1 shilling)	obverse	1953–1961
Elizabeth II	1926–2022	Queen of the United Kingdom (1952–2022)	Pound	2/- (1 florin)	obverse	1953–1961
Elizabeth II	1926–2022	Queen of the United Kingdom (1952–2022)	Pound	21/2 shillings	obverse	1953–1961
Elizabeth II	1926–2022	Queen of the United Kingdom (1952–2022)	Pound	1/2 sovereign	obverse	1953–1961
Elizabeth II	1926–2022	Queen of the United Kingdom (1952–2022)	Pound	1 sovereign	obverse	1953–1961
George V	1865–1936	King of the United Kingdom (1910–1936)	Pound	1/4d	obverse	1923–1937
George V	1865–1936	King of the United Kingdom (1910–1936)	Pound	1/2d	obverse	1923–1937
George V	1865–1936	King of the United Kingdom (1910–1936)	Pound	1d	obverse	1923–1937
George V	1865–1936	King of the United Kingdom (1910–1936)	Pound	3d	obverse	1923–1937
George V	1865–1936	King of the United Kingdom (1910–1936)	Pound	6d	obverse	1923–1937
George V	1865–1936	King of the United Kingdom (1910–1936)	Pound	1/- (1 shilling)	obverse	1923–1937
George V	1865–1936	King of the United Kingdom (1910–1936)	Pound	2/- (1 florin)	obverse	1923–1937
George V	1865–1936	King of the United Kingdom (1910–1936)	Pound	21/2 shillings	obverse	1923–1937
George V	1865–1936	King of the United Kingdom (1910–1936)	Pound	1/2 sovereign	obverse	1923–1937
George V	1865–1936	King of the United Kingdom (1910–1936)	Pound	1 sovereign	obverse	1923–1937
George VI	1895–1952	King of the United Kingdom (1936–1952)	Pound	1/4d	obverse	1937–1953
George VI	1895–1952	King of the United Kingdom (1936–1952)	Pound	1/2d	obverse	1937–1953
George VI	1895–1952	King of the United Kingdom (1936–1952)	Pound	1d	obverse	1937–1953
George VI	1895–1952	King of the United Kingdom (1936–1952)	Pound	3d	obverse	1937–1953
George VI	1895–1952	King of the United Kingdom (1936–1952)	Pound	6d	obverse	1937–1953
George VI	1895–1952	King of the United Kingdom (1936–1952)	Pound	1/- (1 shilling)	obverse	1937–1953
George VI	1895–1952	King of the United Kingdom (1936–1952)	Pound	2/- (1 florin)	obverse	1937–1953
George VI	1895–1952	King of the United Kingdom (1936–1952)	Pound	21/2 shillings	obverse	1937–1953
George VI	1895–1952	King of the United Kingdom (1936–1952)	Pound	1/2 sovereign	obverse	1937–1953
George VI	1895–1952	King of the United Kingdom (1936–1952)	Pound	1 sovereign	obverse	1937–1953

=== South Korea ===
Currency/Subdivision: Won (1945–1953)/Jeon (1/100)
Currency/Subdivision: Hwan (1953–1962)/Jeon (1/100)
Currency/Subdivision: Won (1962–Present)/Jeon (1/100)
Currency Code: KRW
See also South Korean won (1945), South Korean hwan, and South Korean won.

Person	Years of Birth/Death	Reason for Honor	Currency	Denomination	Obverse or Reverse	Years of Circulation
I Seungman	1875–1965	1st President of the Provisional Government of South Korea (1919–1925); 1st, 2nd, & 3rd President of the Republic of Korea (1948–1960)	won	100 won	obverse	1959–1962

=== Soviet Union ===
Currency/Subdivision: Ruble (руб, 1917–1991)/Kopek (к, 1/100)
Currency Code: SUR
See also Soviet ruble.

Person	Years of Birth/Death	Reason for Honor	Currency	Denomination	Obverse or Reverse	Years of Circulation
Vladimir Lenin	1870–1924	Leader of the October Revolution; 1st Chairman of the Council of People's Commissars (1917–1924)	Ruble	50к	obverse	1967–1991

=== Thailand ===
Currency/Subdivision: Tical (1857–1925)/Satang (st, 1/100)
Currency/Subdivision: Baht (฿, 1925–Present)/Satang (st, 1/100)
Currency Code: THB
See also Thai baht.

Person	Years of Birth/Death	Reason for Honor	Currency	Denomination	Obverse or Reverse	Years of Circulation
Chulalongkorn	1853–1910	King of Siam (1868–1910)	Tical	1 fueang (12.5st)	obverse	1876–1909
Chulalongkorn	1853–1910	King of Siam (1868–1910)	Tical	1 salueng (25st)	obverse	1876–1913
Chulalongkorn	1853–1910	King of Siam (1868–1910)	Tical	50st	obverse	1876–1913
Chulalongkorn	1853–1910	King of Siam (1868–1910)	Tical	1 tical	obverse	1876–1913
Chulalongkorn	1853–1910	King of Siam (1868–1910)	Tical	1 solot (0.78125st)	obverse	1887–1909
Chulalongkorn	1853–1910	King of Siam (1868–1910)	Tical	1 at (1.5625st)	obverse	1887–1909
Chulalongkorn	1853–1910	King of Siam (1868–1910)	Tical	1 siao (3.125st)	obverse	1887–1909
Vajiravudh	1881–1925	King of Siam (1910–1925)	Tical; Baht	1 salueng (25st)	obverse	1913–1930
Vajiravudh	1881–1925	King of Siam (1910–1925)	Tical; Baht	2 salueng (50st)	obverse	1913–1930
Vajiravudh	1881–1925	King of Siam (1910–1925)	Tical; Baht	฿1	obverse	1913–1918
Prajadhipok	1893–1941	King of Siam (1925–1935)	Baht	25st	obverse	1930–1942
Prajadhipok	1893–1941	King of Siam (1925–1935)	Baht	50st	obverse	1930–1942
Ananda Mahidol	1925–1946	King of Siam (1935–1946)	Baht	5st	obverse	1946–1950
Ananda Mahidol	1925–1946	King of Siam (1935–1946)	Baht	10st	obverse	1946–1950
Ananda Mahidol	1925–1946	King of Siam (1935–1946)	Baht	25st	obverse	1946–1950
Ananda Mahidol	1925–1946	King of Siam (1935–1946)	Baht	50st	obverse	1946–1950
Bhumibol Adulyadej	1927–2016	King of Thailand (1946–2016)	Baht	5st	obverse	1950–2018
Bhumibol Adulyadej	1927–2016	King of Thailand (1946–2016)	Baht	10st	obverse	1950–2018
Bhumibol Adulyadej	1927–2016	King of Thailand (1946–2016)	Baht	25st	obverse	1950–2018
Bhumibol Adulyadej	1927–2016	King of Thailand (1946–2016)	Baht	50st	obverse	1950–2018
Bhumibol Adulyadej	1927–2016	King of Thailand (1946–2016)	Baht	฿1	obverse	1950–2018
Bhumibol Adulyadej	1927–2016	King of Thailand (1946–2016)	Baht	฿5	obverse	1972–2018
Bhumibol Adulyadej	1927–2016	King of Thailand (1946–2016)	Baht	1st	obverse	1987–2018
Bhumibol Adulyadej	1927–2016	King of Thailand (1946–2016)	Baht	฿10	obverse	1988–2018
Bhumibol Adulyadej	1927–2016	King of Thailand (1946–2016)	Baht	฿2	obverse	2005–2018

=== United Kingdom ===
Currency/Subdivision: Pound Sterling (£, 1138–Present)/Pence (p, 1/240, 1158–1971; 1/100, 1971–Present)
Currency Code: GBP
See also Coins of the pound sterling and Pound sterling.

Person	Years of Birth/Death	Reason for Honor	Currency	Denomination	Obverse or Reverse	Years of Circulation
Anne	1665–1714	King of Great Britain and Ireland (1702–1714)	Pound Sterling	1 farthing (1/4p)	obverse	1702–1714
Charles I	1600–1649	King of England, Scotland, and Ireland (1625–1649)	Pound Sterling	1 farthing (1/4p)	obverse	1625–1649
Charles II	1630–1685	King of Scots, King of England and Ireland (1660–1685)	Pound Sterling	1 farthing (1/4p)	obverse	1660–1685
Edward I	1239–1307	King of England (1272–1307)	Pound Sterling	1 farthing (1/4p)	obverse	????-????
Edward I	1239–1307	King of England (1272–1307)	Pound Sterling	1 halfpenny (1/2p)	obverse	????-????
Edward II	1284–1327	King of England (1307–1327)	Pound Sterling	1 farthing (1/4p)	obverse	????-????
Edward III	1312–1377	King of England (1327–1377)	Pound Sterling	1 farthing (1/4p)	obverse	????-????
Edward IV	1442–1483	King of England (1461–1470 and 1470–1471)	Pound Sterling	1 farthing (1/4p)	obverse	????-????
Edward VI	1537–1553	King of England (1547–1553)	Pound Sterling	1 farthing (1/4p)	obverse	1547–1553
Edward VII	1841–1910	King of the United Kingdom (1901–1910)	Pound Sterling	3/4 farthing (1/12p)	obverse	1902–1913
Edward VII	1841–1910	King of the United Kingdom (1901–1910)	Pound Sterling	1 farthing (1/4p)	obverse	1901–1911
Elizabeth II	1926–2022	Queen of the United Kingdom (1952–2022)	Pound Sterling	1 farthing (1/4p)	obverse	1953–1960
Elizabeth II	1926–2022	Queen of the United Kingdom (1952–2022)	Pound Sterling	Halfpenny (1/2p)	obverse	1953–1984
Elizabeth II	1926–2022	Queen of the United Kingdom (1952–2022)	Pound Sterling	3p	obverse	1953–1971
Elizabeth II	1926–2022	Queen of the United Kingdom (1952–2022)	Pound Sterling	6p	obverse	1953–1980
Elizabeth II	1926–2022	Queen of the United Kingdom (1952–2022)	Pound Sterling	12p	obverse	1953–1990
George I	1660–1727	King of Great Britain and Ireland (1714–1727)	Pound Sterling	1 farthing (1/4p)	obverse	1717–1730
George II	1683–1760	King of Great Britain and Ireland (1727–1760)	Pound Sterling	1 farthing (1/4p)	obverse	1730–1771
George III	1738–1820	King of the United Kingdom (1760–1820)	Pound Sterling	1 farthing (1/4p)	obverse	1771–1821
George IV	1762–1830	King of the United Kingdom (1820–1830)	Pound Sterling	1/3 farthing (1/12p)	obverse	1827–1835
George IV	1762–1830	King of the United Kingdom (1820–1830)	Pound Sterling	1 farthing (1/4p)	obverse	1821–1831
George V	1865–1936	King of the United Kingdom (1910–1936)	Pound Sterling	1/3 farthing (1/12p)	obverse	1913–????
George V	1865–1936	King of the United Kingdom (1910–1936)	Pound Sterling	1 farthing (1/4p)	obverse	1911–1831
George VI	1895–1952	King of the United Kingdom (1936–1952)	Pound Sterling	1 farthing (1/4p)	obverse	1936–1952
Henry I	1068–1135	King of England (1100–1135)	Pound Sterling	1 halfpenny (1/2p)	obverse	????-????
Henry III	1207–1272	King of England (1216–1272)	Pound Sterling	1 halfpenny (1/2p)	obverse	????-????
Henry IV	1367–1413	King of England (1399–1413)	Pound Sterling	1 farthing (1/4p)	obverse	????-????
Henry V	1387–1422	King of England (1399–1413)	Pound Sterling	1 farthing (1/4p)	obverse	????-????
Henry VI	1421–1471	King of England (1422–1461 and 1470–1471)	Pound Sterling	1 farthing (1/4p)	obverse	????-????
Henry VII	1457–1509	King of England (1457–1509)	Pound Sterling	1 farthing (1/4p)	obverse	????-????
Henry VIII of England	1491–1547	King of England (1509–1547)	Pound Sterling	1 farthing (1/4p)	obverse	1509–1547
James I	1566–1625	King of Scots (1567–1625); King of England and Ireland (1603–1625)	Pound Sterling	1 farthing (1/4p)	obverse	1566–1625
James II	1633–1701	King of England, Scotland, and Ireland (1685–1688)	Pound Sterling	1 farthing (1/4p)	obverse	1685–1688
Mary II	1662–1694	Queen of England, Scotland, and Ireland (1689–1694)	Pound Sterling	1 farthing (1/4p)	obverse	1689–1694
Richard II	1367–1400	King of England (1377–1399)	Pound Sterling	1 farthing (1/4p)	obverse	????-????
Richard III	1452–1485	King of England (1483–1485)	Pound Sterling	1 farthing (1/4p)	obverse	????-????
Victoria	1819–1901	Queen of the United Kingdom (1837–1901)	Pound Sterling	1/4 farthing (1/16p)	obverse	1839–1853
Victoria	1819–1901	Queen of the United Kingdom (1837–1901)	Pound Sterling	{{fraction|1|3}} farthing (1/12p)	obverse	1866–1902
Victoria	1819–1901	Queen of the United Kingdom (1837–1901)	Pound Sterling	1/2 farthing (1/8p)	obverse	1828–1869
Victoria	1819–1901	Queen of the United Kingdom (1837–1901)	Pound Sterling	1 farthing (1/4p)	obverse	1838–1902
William III	1650–1702	King of England, Scotland, and Ireland (1689–1702)	Pound Sterling	1 farthing (1/4p)	obverse	1689–1702
William IV	1765–1837	King of the United Kingdom (1830–1837)	Pound Sterling	1/3 farthing (1/12p)	obverse	1835–1866
William IV	1765–1837	King of the United Kingdom (1830–1837)	Pound Sterling	1 farthing (1/4p)	obverse	1831–1838

=== United States ===
Currency/Subdivision: Dollar ($, 1792–Present)/Cent (¢, 1/100)
Currency Code: USD
See also Coins of the United States dollar, Template:Obsolete U.S. currency and coinage and United States dollar.

Person	Years of Birth/Death	Reason for Honor	Currency	Denomination	Obverse or Reverse	Years of Circulation
Dwight D. Eisenhower	1890–1969	34th President of the United States (1953–1961)	Dollar	$1	obverse	1971–1978
Benjamin Franklin	1706–1790	Founding Father	Dollar	50¢	obverse	1948–1963
