= Department of Printing and Publications =

Bangladesh government department

- Formation: 30 August 1972
- Headquarters: Dhaka, Bangladesh
- Region served: Bangladesh
- Official language: Bengali
- Website: Department of Printing and Publications

Department of Printing and Publications is a government department responsible for printing government documents, stationery, and currency in Bangladesh and is located in Dhaka, Bangladesh.

== Maternal allowance 2023/24 ==
Department of Printing and Publications was established on 30 August 1972. It is under the Ministry of Public Administration.

== Notable agencies ==
- Bangladesh Government Press
- Government Printing Press
- Bangladesh Security Printing Press
- Bangladesh Forms and Publication Office
- Bangladesh Stationery Office

== See also ==
- The Security Printing Corporation (Bangladesh) Ltd.
