= Bangladesh Security Printing Press =

Government owned press in Bangladesh

Bangladesh Security Printing Press Bangladesh Nirapotta Mudronaloy
- Industry: printing press
- Founded: 1973
- Headquarters: Dhaka, Bangladesh
- Products: security-related documents
- Parent: Department of Printing and Publications
- Website: https://www.dpp.gov.bd/bsppress/bangla/index.php

Bangladesh Security Printing Press or Bangladesh Nirappotta Mudronaloy is a printing press of the Department of Printing and Publications under the Ministry of Public Administration of Bangladesh. Established in 1973, it is a highly sensitive KPI-1 (Key Point Installation) government organization that provides important and sensitive security printing materials to the Government of Bangladesh.

== See also ==
- Bangladesh Government Press
- Government Printing Press
- Bangladesh Bank
- Department of Printing and Publications
- The Security Printing Corporation (Bangladesh) Ltd.
