= List of banknote printers =

The following is a list providing an overview of private companies and state-owned enterprises that are active in the field of printing banknotes.

== List ==
Country	Name (abbreviation)	Foundation (printing)	Government affiliation	Ref
Algeria	Hôtel des Monnaies	1964	Bank of Algeria	
Argentina	Casa de Moneda de la República Argentina	1826	Ministry of the Treasury	
Australia	Note Printing Australia (NPA)	1913	Reserve Bank of Australia	
Austria	Oesterreichische Banknoten- und Sicherheitsdruck GmbH (OeBS)		Oesterreichische Nationalbank	
Bangladesh	The Security Printing Corporation (Bangladesh) Ltd. (SPCBL)	1972	Bangladesh Bank	
Belgium	Imprimerie de la Banque nationale de Belgique	1850	National Bank of Belgium	
Brazil	Casa da Moeda do Brasil (CMB)	1694 (1969)	Ministry of Economy	
Bulgaria	BNB Printing Works	2001	National Bank of Bulgaria (Note: Started as a Joint venture with Oberthur Fiduciaire.)	
Cambodia	Printing House Department		National Bank of Cambodia	
Canada	Canadian Bank Note Company (CBNC)	1897	None (Privately held company)	
Chile	La Casa de Moneda de Chile (CMCh)	1743 (1927)	CORFO	
China	China Banknote Printing and Minting Corporation (CBPMC)	1908	People's Bank of China	
Colombia	Imprenta de Billetes	1959	Bank of the Republic	
Cuba	Impresos de Seguridad Cuba (IdSC)		Government of Cuba	
Czech Republic	Státní tiskárna cenin	1953	Ministry of Finance	
DR Congo	Hotel des Monnaies (RDC)	1987	Central Bank of the Congo	
Denmark	Banknote Printing Works	1818 (1945)	Danmarks Nationalbank	
Egypt	Banknote Printing Press	1968	Central Bank of Egypt	
Germany	Bundesdruckerei GmbH	1763 (1851/1879)	Federal Ministry of Finance	
Germany	Giesecke+Devrient GmbH (G+D)	1852	None (Privately held company)	
Greece	Idryma Trapezis tis Ellados	1941	Bank of Greece	
France	Imprimerie de la Banque de France – Chamalières	1918	Bank of France	
France	Oberthur Fiduciaire	1842 (1940)	None (Privately held company)	
Hong Kong	Hong Kong Note Printing Limited (HKNPL)	1984	Government of Hong Kong (Note: Started as a De La Rue subsidiary in 1984, purchased by Hong Kong Exchange Fund in 1996. Current minority shareholders are China Banknote Printing and Minting Corporation (15%), The Hongkong and Shanghai Banking Corporation (10%), Standard Chartered Hong Kong (10%) and Bank of China (Hong Kong) Limited (10%).)	
Hungary	Pénzjegynyomda Zrt.	1922 (1925)	Hungarian National Bank	
India	Security Printing & Minting Corporation of India Limited (SPMCIL)	1928	Ministry of Finance	
India	Bharatiya Reserve Bank Note Mudran (BRBNMPL)	1995	Reserve Bank of India	
Indonesia	Perum Percetakan Uang R.I. (PERURI)	1971	State Owned Enterprises Ministry	
Indonesia	Pura Group Total Security System (TSS)	1908 (1970)	None (Privately held company)	
Iran	Security Printing and Minting Organization (SPMO)	1877 (1983)	Central Bank of Iran	
Iraq	Central Bank of Iraq	1950	Government of Iraq	
Ireland	Currency Centre	1978	Central Bank of Ireland	
Italy	Officina Carte Valori (OCV)	1928	Bank of Italy	
Japan	National Printing Bureau (NPB)	1877	Government of Japan	
Kazakhstan	Banknote Factory (BFNBK)	1995	National Bank of Kazakhstan (Note: Started as a Joint venture with De La Rue.)	
Kenya	De La Rue Kenya EPZ Limited		The National Treasury (Note: Since 2019, the company operates as a Joint venture between De La Rue (60%) and Government of Kenya (40%).)	
Laos	Printing House		Bank of the Lao P.D.R.	
Malta	De La Rue Currency & Security Print Ltd.	1979	None (Privately held company) (Note: Subsidiary of De La Rue.)	
Malta	Crane Currency Malta Ltd.	2017 (2018)	None (Privately held company) (Note: Subsidiary of Crane Currency.)	
Mexico	Fábrica de Billetes del Banco de México	1969	Bank of Mexico	
Morocco	Dar As Sikkah	1987	Bank Al-Maghrib	
Myanmar	Security Printing Works Factory – Wazi (SPW)	1972	Central Bank of Myanmar (Note: Started as a Joint venture with Giesecke+Devrient.)	
Netherlands	Royal Joh. Enschedé	1703 (1814)	None (Privately held company)	
Nigeria	Nigerian Security Printing and Minting Company Limited (NSPMC)	1963	Central Bank of Nigeria	
Pakistan	Pakistan Security Printing Corporation (PSPC)	1949	State Bank of Pakistan	
Philippines	Banknotes and Securities Printing Department (BSPD)	1978	Bangko Sentral ng Pilipinas	
Poland	Polska Wytwórnia Papierów Wartociowych S.A. (PWPW)	1919	Ministry of Interior and Administration	
Portugal	Imprensa Nacional-Casa da Moeda (INCM)	1972	Banco de Portugal	
Portugal	Valora S.A. (VSA)	1999	Banco de Portugal	
Romania	Imprimeria Bancii Nationale a Romaniei (NBR)	1896	National Bank of Romania	
Russia	JSC Goznak	1818	Ministry of Finance	
Serbia	Zavod za izradu novčanica i kovanog novca – Topčider (ZIN)	1929	National Bank of Serbia	
South Africa	South African Bank Note Company (SABN)	1961	South African Reserve Bank (Note: Started as a Joint venture with Bradbury Wilkinson and Company.)	
South Korea	Korea Minting and Security Printing Corporation (KOMSCO)	1951	Government of South Korea	
Spain	Fábrica Nacional de Moneda y Timbre (FNMT)	1893 (1940)	Ministry of Economy	
Sri Lanka	De La Rue Lanka Currency & Security Print (Pvt.) Ltd.	1986 (1987)	Government of Sri Lanka (Note: The company is a Joint venture between De La Rue (60%) and Government of Sri Lanka (40%).)	
Sudan	Sudan Currency Printing Press (SCPP)	1994	None (Privately held company)	
Sweden	Crane AB	1755	None (Privately held company) (Note: Crane AB was formerly named Tumba Bruk and was affiliated with the Sveriges Riksbank. It was purchased by Crane Currency in 2002.)	
Switzerland	Orell Füssli Security Printing Ltd. (OFS)	1519 (1911)	None (Privately held company)	
Thailand	Note Printing Works	1969	Bank of Thailand	
Taiwan	Central Engraving and Printing Plant (CEPP)	1941	Central Bank of China	
Turkey	Banknot Matbaasi	1955	Merkez Bankası	
UAE	Oumolat Security Printing	2017	Central Bank of UAE	
Ukraine	NBU Banknote Printing and Minting Works	1994	National Bank of Ukraine	
United Kingdom	De La Rue plc	1813 (1860)	None (Privately held company)	
United States	Crane Currency	1770 (1806)	None (Privately held company)	
United States	Bureau of Engraving and Printing (BEP)	1862 (1877)	Department of the Treasury	
Uzbekistan	Davlat Belgisi	1995	Central Bank of Uzbekistan	
Venezuela	Casa de la Moneda de Venezuela (CMV)	1802 (1999)	Banco Central de Venezuela	
Vietnam	National Banknote Printing Plant (NBPP)	1946	State Bank of Vietnam	
Zimbabwe	Fidelity Printers and Refinery (FPR)	1966	Reserve Bank of Zimbabwe	

== Historic printers ==
Country	Name	Year of start	Year of end
Argentina	Compañía de Valores Sudamericana	1951	2013 (Note: Merged into Casa de Moneda de la República Argentina.)
Canada	The British American Bank Note Company	1866	1956
Finland	Setec Oy	1999	2005
United Kingdom	Perkins Bacon	1810	1935
United Kingdom	Harrison and Sons	1750	1997 (Note: Purchased by De La Rue and later shut down.)
United Kingdom	Waterlow and Sons	1810	2009
United Kingdom	Bradbury Wilkinson and Company	1856	1990
United States	New York Bank Note Company	1877	
United States	Homer Lee Bank Note Company		1891 (Note: Purchased by American Bank Note Company.)
United States	American Bank Note Company	1795	(Note: It is still active by the name ABCorp, however does not print banknotes anymore.)
United States	Hamilton Bank Note Company		

== See also ==
- Security printing
- List of mints
