= South African rand =

Currency of South Africa

List: 10 other official names: Suid-Afrikaanse rand (Afrikaans); iRanti yeSewula Afrika (Southern Ndebele); iRanti yoMzantsi Afrika (Xhosa); iRandi laseNingizimu Afrika (Zulu); liRandi laseNingizimu Afrika (Swazi); Ranta ya Afrika Borwa (Northern Sotho); Ranta ya Afrika Borwa (Sotho); Ranta ya Aforika Borwa (Tswana); Rhandi ya Afrika-Dzonga (Tsonga); Rannda ya Afurika Tshipembe (Venda)
- South African rand banknotes

ISO 4217
- Code: ZAR (numeric: 710)
- Subunit: 0.01

Units of account
- Plural: rand
- Symbol: R
- Subunit
- 1/100: Cent
- Symbol
- Cent: c

Denominations
- Banknotes: R10, R20, R50, R100, R200
- Coins: 10c, 20c, 50c, R1, R2, R5
- Rarely used: 1 cent and 2 cents (both discontinued 2002) and 5 cents (discontinued 2012)

Demographics
- Official user(s): South Africa (Note: A Common Monetary Area member.); Namibia (Note: A Common Monetary Area member, used alongside Namibian dollar); Lesotho (Note: A Common Monetary Area member, used alongside Lesotho loti); Eswatini (Note: A Common Monetary Area member, used alongside Swazi lilangeni)
- Unofficial users: Angola; Malawi; Zambia; Zimbabwe (Note: Alongside Zimbabwean ZiG.)

Issuance
- Central bank: South African Reserve Bank
- Website: www.resbank.co.za
- Printer: South African Bank Note Company
- Mint: South African Mint
- Website: www.samint.co.za

Valuation
- Inflation: 2.7% (South Africa only)
- Source: StatsSA , Dec 2024
- Method: CPI
- Pegged by: Namibian dollar Lesotho loti Swazi lilangeni (at par)

The South African rand, or simply the rand, (sign: R; code: ZAR) (Note: From Zuid-Afrikaanse rand; the ZA is a historical relic from Dutch, used because "SA" is allocated to Saudi Arabia.) is the official currency of South Africa. It is subdivided into 100 cents (sign: "c"), a comma separates the rand and cents.

The South African rand is legal tender in the Common Monetary Area member states of Namibia, Lesotho, and Eswatini, with these three countries also having national currencies (the dollar, the loti, and the lilangeni respectively) pegged with the rand at parity and still widely accepted as substitutes. The rand was also legal tender in Botswana until 1976, when the pula replaced the rand at par.

The rand is legal tender in Zimbabwe as part of its multiple currency system, which also includes other currencies, such as the euro, the pound sterling, the US dollar, and the Zimbabwean ZiG.

== Etymology ==
The rand takes its name from the Witwatersrand ("white waters' ridge" in English, rand being the Afrikaans and Dutch word for 'ridge'), the ridge upon which Johannesburg is built and where most of South Africa's gold deposits were found. In English, Afrikaans and Dutch, the singular and plural forms of the unit ("rand") are the same: one rand, ten rand, and two million rand.

== History ==
The rand was introduced in the Union of South Africa in 1961, three months before the country declared itself a republic. A Decimal Coinage Commission had been set up in 1956 to consider a move away from the denominations of pounds, shillings, and pence; it submitted its recommendations on 8 August 1958. It replaced the South African pound as legal tender, at the rate of 2 rand to 1 pound, or 10 shillings to the rand. The government introduced a mascot, Decimal Dan, "the rand-cent man" (known in Afrikaans as Daan Desimaal). This was accompanied by a radio jingle to inform the public about the new currency. Although pronounced in the Afrikaans style as /rʌnt/ in the jingles when introduced, the contemporary pronunciation in South African English is /rænd/.

=== Brief exchange rate history ===
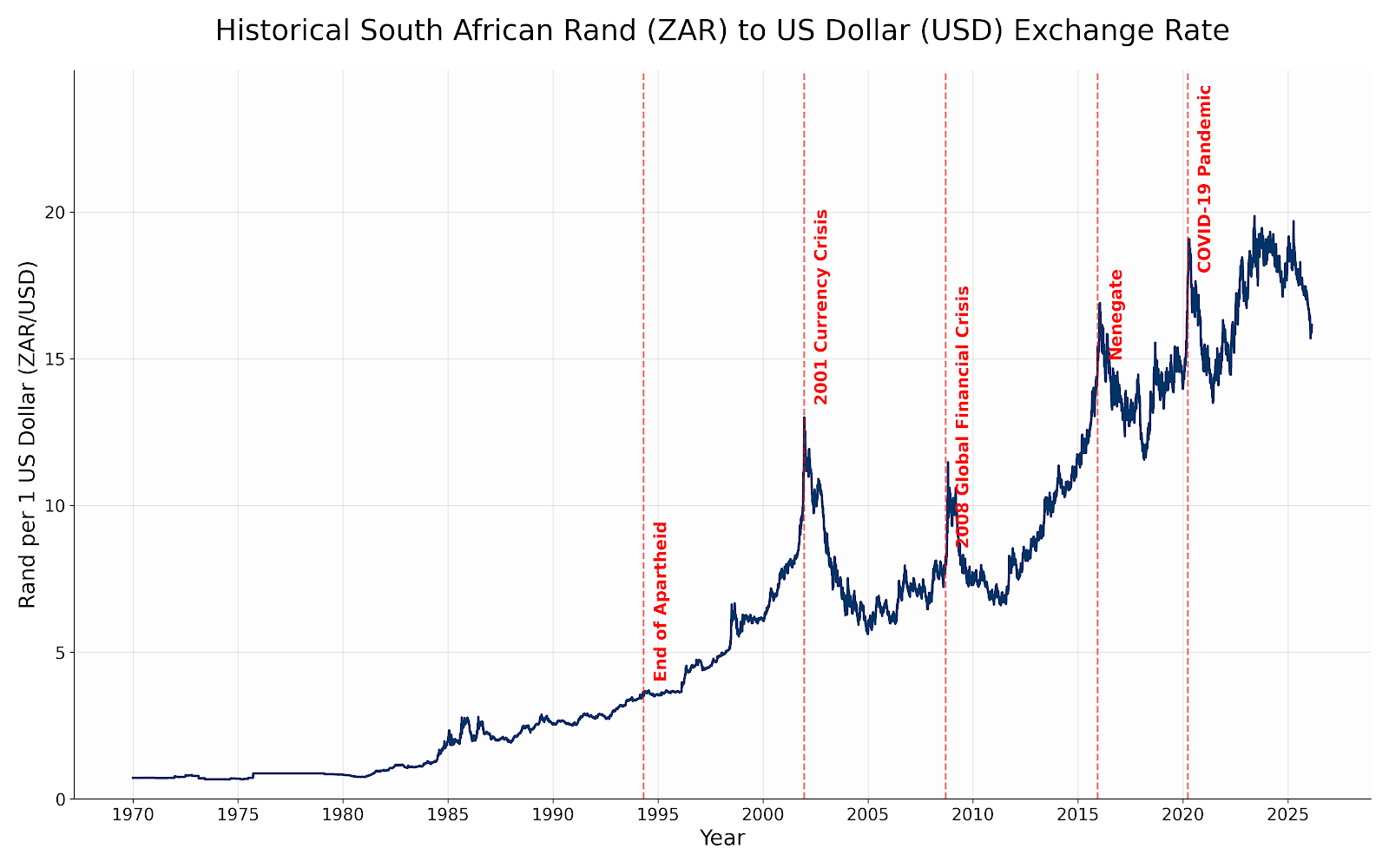
Rand per US Dollar (1970–2026)

==== 1961–2000 ====
One rand was worth US$1.40 (R0,72 per dollar) from the time of its inception in 1961 until late 1971, the U.S. dollar became stronger than the South African currency for the first time on 15 March 1982. Its value thereafter fluctuated as various exchange rate dispensations were implemented by the South African authorities. By the early 1980s, high inflation, mounting political pressure, and sanctions placed against the country due to international opposition to apartheid had started to erode its value. The currency broke above parity with the dollar for the first time in March 1982. It continued to trade between R1 and R1,30 to the dollar until June 1984, when the currency's depreciation gained momentum. By February 1985, the currency was trading at over R2 per dollar. In July of that year, authorities suspended all foreign exchange trading for three days in an attempt to halt the currency's depreciation.

By the time that State President P. W. Botha made his Rubicon speech on 15 August 1985, it had weakened to R2,40 per dollar. The currency recovered somewhat between 1986 and 1988, trading near the R2 level usually and breaking beneath it sporadically. The recovery was short-lived; by the end of 1989, the rand was trading at more than R2,50 per dollar.

As it became clear in the early 1990s that the country was destined for Black majority rule and one reform after the other were announced. Uncertainty about the country's future hastened the depreciation until a level of R3 to the dollar was breached in November 1992. A host of local and international events influenced the currency after that, most notably the 1994 general election, which weakened it to over R3.60 to the dollar; the election of Tito Mboweni as the governor of the South African Reserve Bank; and the inauguration of President Thabo Mbeki in 1999, quickened the slide to over R6 to the dollar. The controversial land reform programme that was initiated in Zimbabwe, followed by the September 11 attacks, propelled it to its weakest historical level of R13,84 to the dollar in December 2001.

==== 2001–2011 ====
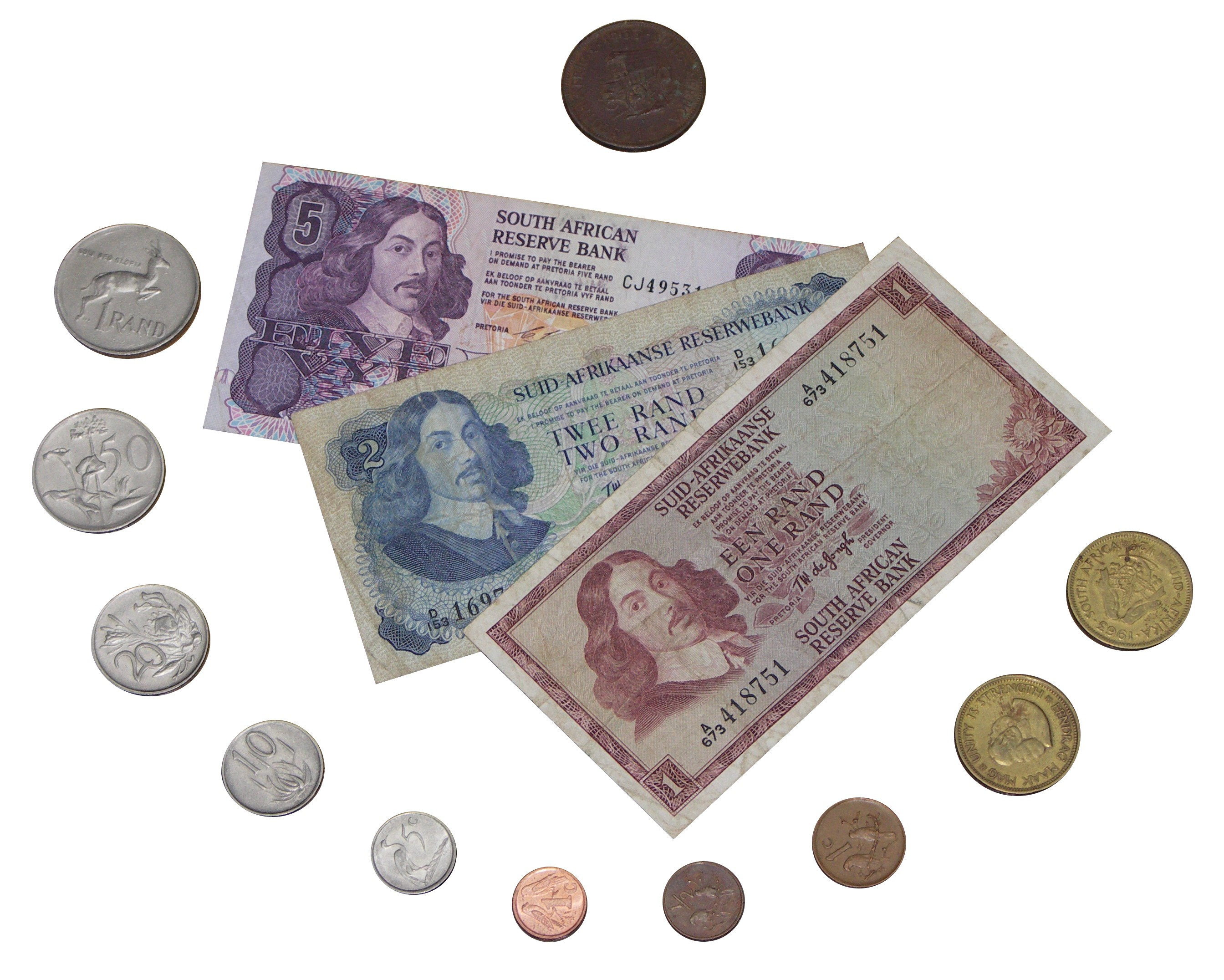
Two generations of older notes and coins, later replaced with the "Big Five" notes, which were in turn replaced to show the face of Nelson Mandela in 2012.

The sudden depreciation in 2001 led to a formal investigation and a dramatic recovery. By the end of 2002, the currency was trading under R9 to the dollar again, and by the end of 2004, it was trading under R5,70. The currency softened somewhat in 2005, trading around R6,35 to the dollar at the end of the year. At the start of 2006, however, the currency resumed its rally and, on 19 January 2006, was trading under R6 to the dollar again. However, the rand weakened significantly during the second and third quarters of 2006 (i.e., April through September).

In sterling terms, it fell from around 9.5% to just over 7%, losing some 25% of its international trade-weighted value in six months. In late 2007, the rand rallied modestly by over 8%, only to experience a precipitous slide during the first quarter of 2008.

This downward slide could be attributed to a range of factors: South Africa's worsening current account deficit, which widened to a 36‑year high of 7.3% of gross domestic product (GDP) in 2007; inflation at a five-year high of just under 9%; escalating global risk aversion as investors' concerns over the spreading impact of the subprime crisis grew; and a general flight to "safe havens", away from the perceived risks of emerging markets. The rand depreciation was exacerbated by the Eskom electricity crisis, which arose from the utility's inability to meet the country's rapidly growing energy demands.

==== 2012–present ====
A stalled mining industry in late 2012 led to new lows in early 2013. In late January 2014, the rand slid to R11,25 to the dollar, with analysts attributing the shift to "word from the US Federal Reserve that it would trim back stimulus spending, which led to a massive sell-off in emerging economies". In 2014, South Africa experienced its worst year against the US dollar since 2009, and in March 2015, the rand traded at its worst since 2002. At the time, Trading Economics released data that the rand averaged R4,97 to the dollar between 1972 and 2015, reaching an all-time high (that is, the rand reaching its lowest relative value) of R12,45 in December 2001 and a record low of R0,67 in June 1973. By the end of 2014, the rand had weakened to R15,05 per dollar, partly due to South Africa's consistent trade account deficit with the rest of the world.

From 9 to 13 December 2015, over four days, the rand dropped over 10% due to what some suspected was President Jacob Zuma's surprise announcement that he would be replacing the Finance Minister Nhlanhla Nene with the little-known David van Rooyen. The rapid decline in value stemmed from when Zuma backtracked and announced that the better-known previous Minister of Finance, Pravin Gordhan, would instead be appointed to the post. Zuma's surprise sacking of Nene damaged international confidence in the rand, and the exchange rate was volatile throughout much of January 2016 and reached an all-time low of R17,9169 to the US dollar on 9 January 2016 before rebounding to R16,57 later the same day.

The January drop in value was also partly caused by Japanese retail investors cutting their losses in the currency to look for higher-yield investments elsewhere and due to concerns over the impact of the economic slowdown in China, South Africa's largest export market. By mid-January, economists were speculating that the rand could expect to see further volatility for the rest of 2016. By 29 April, it reached its highest performance over the previous five months, exchanging at a rate of R14,16 to the United States dollar.

Following the United Kingdom voting to leave the European Union, the rand dropped in value over 8% against the US$ on 24 June 2016, the currency's largest single-day decline since the 2008 economic crash. This was partly due to a general global financial retreat from currencies seen as risky to the US dollar and partly due to concerns over how British withdrawal from the EU would impact the South African economy and trade relations.

In April 2017, a Reuters poll estimated that the rand would remain relatively stable for the rest of the year, two polls found that analysts had already factored in a possible downgrade to "junk" status. At the time, Moody's rated South Africa two notches above junk status. After President Jacob Zuma narrowly won a motion of no confidence in South Africa in August 2017, the rand continued to slide, dropping 1.7% that same day. In September 2017, Goldman Sachs said that the debt and corruption of Eskom Holdings was the biggest risk to South Africa's economy and the exchange rate of the rand. At that time, Eskom Holdings had no permanent CEO, and Colin Coleman of Goldman Sachs in Africa stated that the company was "having discussions on solutions" to find credible management. In October 2017, the rand firmed against the US dollar as it recovered from a six-month low. Olivia Kumwenda-Mtambo noted, "South Africa is highly susceptible to global investor sentiment as the country relies on foreign money to cover its large budget and current account deficits." On 13 November 2017, the rand fell by over 1% when the budget chief, Michael Sachs, stepped down from his position in Zuma's administration.

In October 2022, the rand sank to its lowest point in two years, reaching R18,46 to the US dollar on 25 October 2022. The rand has never suffered from much inflation compared to other African currencies, with the same value as other currencies such as the Euro, US dollar and Renminbi since 2016. The rand began appreciating in value in 2024 compared to the USD, and it remained stable.

== Coins ==
A 5 rand bimetallic coin issued in 2004.

Coins were introduced in 1961 in denominations of 1/2, 1, 2 1/2, 5, 10, 20, and 50 cents. In 1965, the introduction of 2-cent coins replaced the 2 1/2 cent coins. The 1/2 cent coin was last struck for circulation in 1973. The 1 rand coin was introduced in 1967, followed by 2 rand coins in 1989 and 5 rand coins in 1994. Production of the 1- and 2-cent coins was discontinued in 2002, followed by 5-cent coins in 2012, primarily due to inflation having devalued them, but they remain legal tender. Shops normally round the total purchase price of goods to the nearest 10 cents.

To curb counterfeiting, a new 5-rand coin was released in August 2004. Security features introduced on the coin include a bimetal design (similar to the €1 and €2 coins, the Thai ฿10 coin, the pre-2018 Philippine ₱10 coin, the British £2 coin, and the Canadian $2 coin), a specially serrated security groove along the rim, and microlettering.

On 3 May 2023, the South African Reserve Bank announced that a new series of coins would be released. These will have the same denominations as the previous series. The 10c will feature an image of the Cape Honey Bee, the 20c the Bitter Aloe, the 50c the Knysna Turaco, the R1 the Springbok, the R2 the King Protea, and the R5 the Southern Right Whale.

== Banknotes ==
The first series of rand banknotes was introduced in 1961 in denominations of 1, 2, 10, and 20 rand, with similar designs and colours to the preceding pound notes to ease the transition. They bore the image of what was believed at the time to be Jan van Riebeeck, the first VOC administrator of Cape Town. It was later discovered that the original portrait was not, in fact, Van Riebeeck at all, but a portrait of Bartholomew Vermuyden had been mistaken for Van Riebeeck.

In 1966, a second series of banknotes with designs that moved away from the previous pound notes was released. Notes with 1, 5, and 10 rand denominations were produced with predominantly one colour per note. A smaller 1 rand note with the same design was introduced in 1973, and a 2 rand note was introduced in 1974. The 20 rand denomination from the first series was discontinued. This series continued the practice of offering both an English and an Afrikaans version of each note.

The 1978 series started with denominations of 2, 5, 10, and 20 rand, with a 50 rand introduced in 1984. This series had only one language variant for each denomination of note. The 2, 10, and 50 rand had Afrikaans first, while the 5 and 20 rand had English first. A coin replaced the one-rand note.

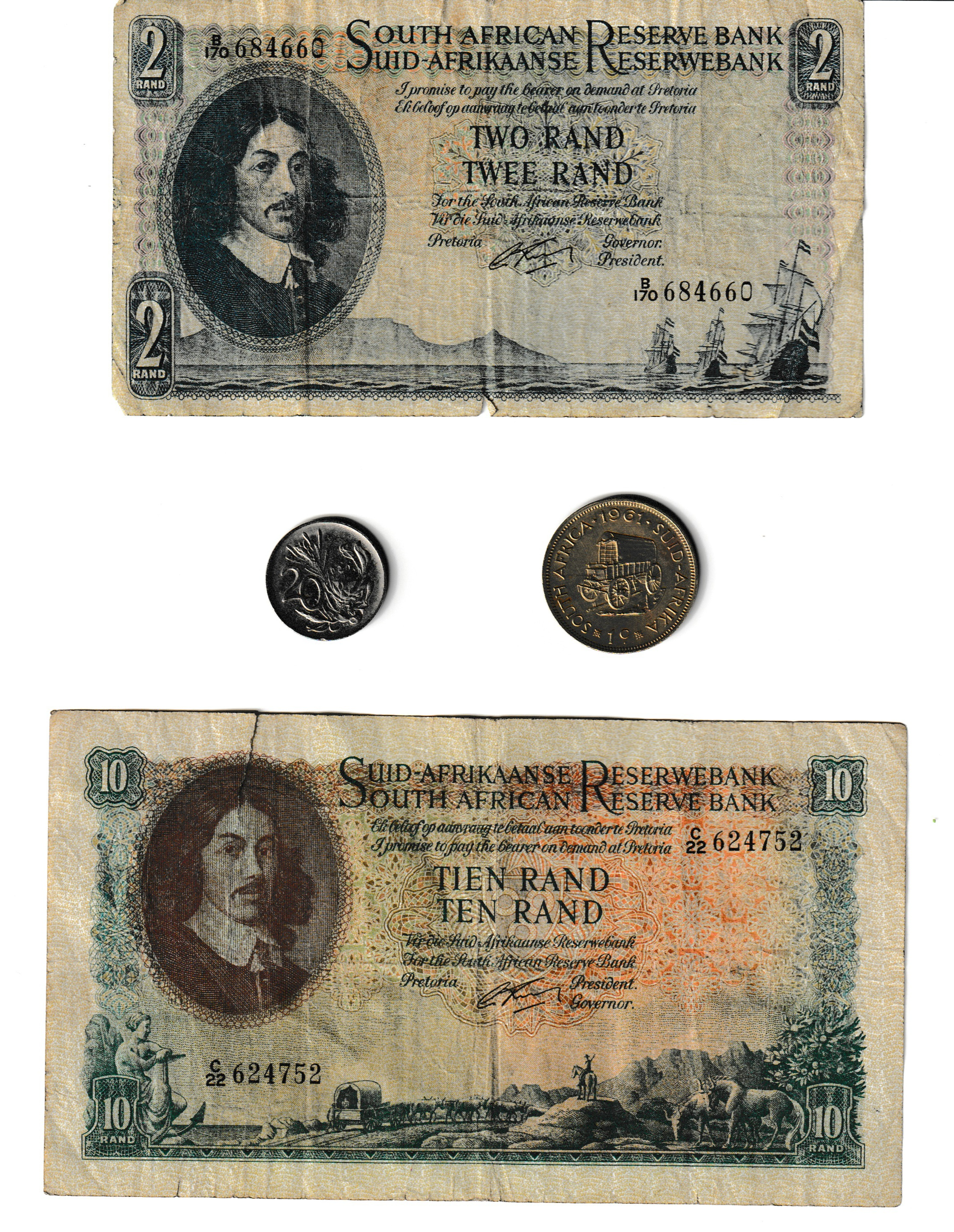
Rand banknotes and coins.

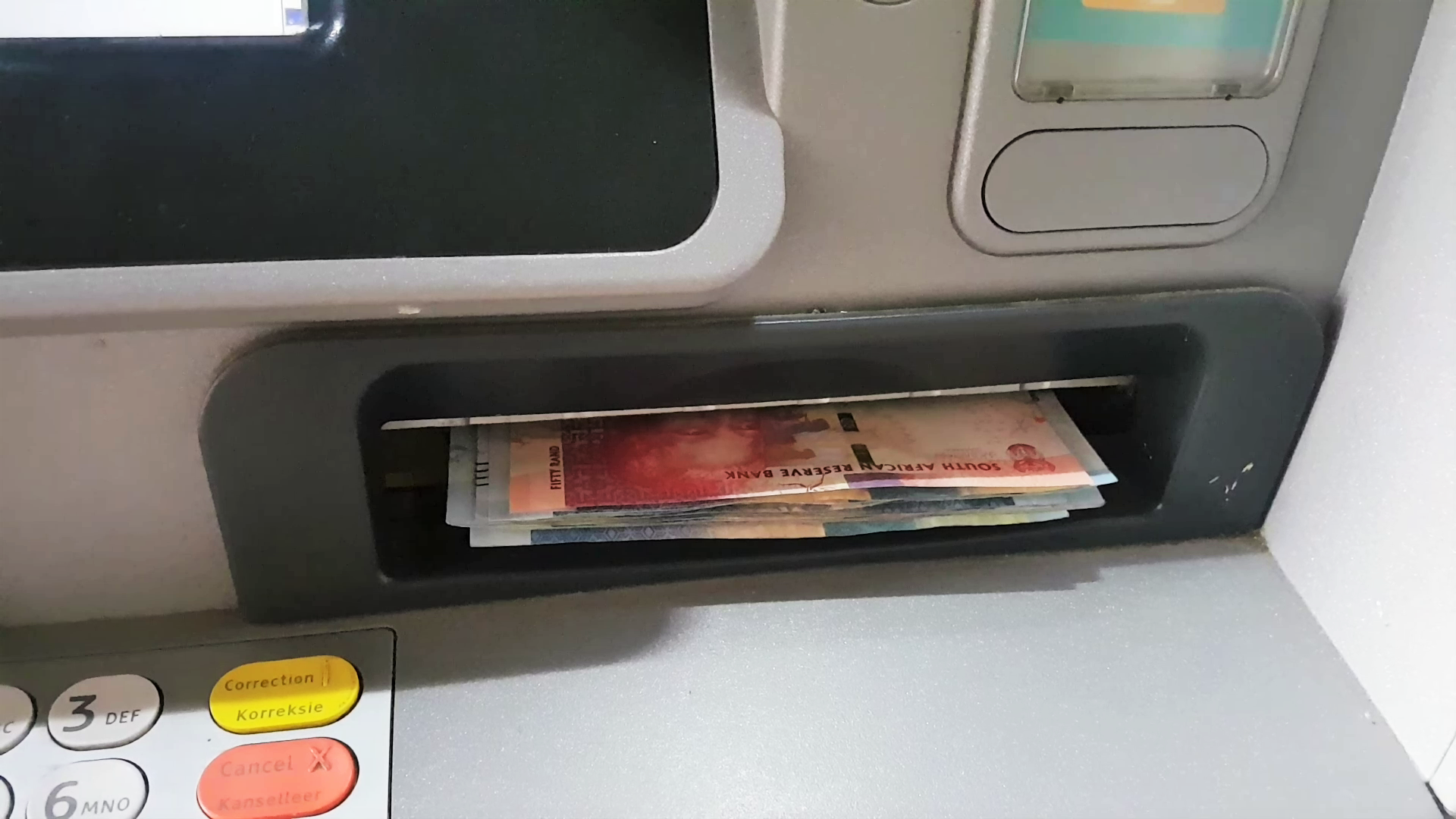
South African ATM showing R50 and R100 banknotes.

During the 1990s, the banknotes were redesigned to feature images of the Big Five wildlife species. 10, 20, and 50 rand notes were introduced in 1992 and 1993, retaining the colour scheme of the previous issue. Coins were introduced for the 2 and 5 rand, replacing the notes of the previous series, mainly because of the severe wear and tear experienced with low-denomination notes in circulation. In 1994, 100 and 200 rand notes were introduced.

The 2005 series has the same principal design but with additional security features, such as colour-shifting ink on the 50 rand and higher and the EURion constellation. The obverses of all denominations were printed in English, while two other official languages were printed on the reverse, thus using all 11 official written languages of South Africa.

In 2010, the South African Reserve Bank and commercial banks withdrew all 1994 series 200-rand banknotes due to relatively high-quality counterfeit notes in circulation.

In 2011, the South African Reserve Bank issued defective 100 rand banknotes that lacked fluorescent printing visible under UV light. In June, the printing of this denomination was moved from the South African Bank Note Company to Crane Currency's Swedish division (Tumba Bruk), which reportedly produced 80 million 100 rand notes. The South African Reserve Bank shredded 3.6 million 100-rand banknotes printed by Crane Currency because they had the same serial numbers as a batch printed by the South African Bank Note Company. In addition, the notes printed in Sweden were not the correct colour and were 1 mm short.

On 11 February 2012, President Jacob Zuma announced that the country would be issuing a new set of banknotes bearing Nelson Mandela's image. They were entered into circulation on 6 November 2012. These contained the same denominations of 10, 20, 50, 100, and 200 rand.

In 2013, the 2012 series was updated with the addition of the EURion constellation to all five denominations. They were entered into circulation on 6 November 2013.

On 18 July 2018, a special commemorative series of banknotes was released in commemoration of the 100th anniversary of Nelson Mandela's birth. This series includes notes of all denominations: 10, 20, 50, 100, and 200 rand. These notes will circulate alongside the existing notes. The notes depict the standard face of Nelson Mandela on the obverse. Still, instead of the Big Five animals on the reverse, they show a younger Mandela with different iconic scenes relating to his legacy. These scenes comprise the rolling hills of the Eastern Cape, featuring Mandela's humble birthplace of Mvezo (10 rand); the home of Mandela in Soweto, where he defined his political life alongside other struggle icons (20 rand); the site where Mandela was captured near Howick, following 17 months in hiding, where a monument to him has been erected (50 rand); the place of Mandela's 27-year imprisonment at Robben Island, showing a pile of quarried limestone (100 rand); and the statue of Mandela at the Union Buildings in remembrance of when he was inaugurated there in 1994 (200 rand).

On 3 May 2023, the South African Reserve Bank announced that a new series of banknotes would retain the image of Nelson Mandela on the obverse while showing the Big 5 in a family depiction on the reverse. This series contains the same denominations of 10, 20, 50, 100, and 200 rand.

=== First series ===
Banknotes of the South African rand (1961 First Issue)
Image	Value	Obverse	Reverse	Colour	Language	Size (mm)
	1 rand	Jan van Riebeeck	Lion from coat of arms	Brown	Afrikaans/English, English/Afrikaans	136×78
	2 rand	Jan van Riebeeck	Lion from coat of arms	Blue	Afrikaans/English, English/Afrikaans	149×84
	10 rand	Jan van Riebeeck	Jan van Riebeeck's sailing ship	Green	Afrikaans/English, English/Afrikaans	170×96
	20 rand	Jan van Riebeeck	Gold mine	Purple	Afrikaans/English, English/Afrikaans	176×103

=== Second series ===
Banknotes of the South African rand (1966 Second Issue)
Image	Value	Obverse	Reverse	Colour	Language	Size (mm)
	1 rand	Jan van Riebeeck and protea	Farming and agriculture	Brown	Afrikaans/English, English/Afrikaans	128×64
	1 rand	Jan van Riebeeck and protea	Farming and agriculture	Brown	Afrikaans/English, English/Afrikaans	120×57
	2 rand	Jan van Riebeeck, Cape Dutch architecture and vines	Gariep Dam, pylon and maize cob	Blue	Afrikaans/English, English/Afrikaans	127×63
	5 rand	Jan van Riebeeck, Voortrekker Monument and Great Trek	Mining	Purple	Afrikaans/English, English/Afrikaans	134×70
	10 rand	Jan van Riebeeck, Union Buildings and springbok	Jan van Riebeeck's three ships	Green	Afrikaans/English, English/Afrikaans	140×76

=== Third series ===
Banknotes of the South African rand (1978 Third Issue)
Image	Value	Obverse	Reverse	Colour	Language	Size (mm)
	2 rand	Jan van Riebeeck and pylon	Sasol coal to oil refinery	Blue	Afrikaans and English	120×57
	5 rand	Jan van Riebeeck and diamonds	Mining and Johannesburg city centre	Purple	Afrikaans and English	127×63
	10 rand	Jan van Riebeeck and protea	Agriculture	Green	Afrikaans and English	133×70
	20 rand	Jan van Riebeeck, Cape Dutch architecture and vines	Jan van Riebeeck's three ships and Coat of Arms of South Africa	Brown	Afrikaans and English	140×77
	50 rand	Jan van Riebeeck and lion	Fauna and flora	Red	Afrikaans and English	147×83

=== Fourth series ===
Banknotes of the South African rand (1992 Fourth Issue "Big Five")
Image	Value	Obverse	Reverse	Colour	Language	Size (mm)
	10 rand	Rhinoceros	Agriculture	Green	Afrikaans and English	128×70
	20 rand	Elephants	Mining	Brown	English and Afrikaans	134×70
	50 rand	Lions	Manufacturing	Red	Afrikaans and English	140×70
	100 rand	Cape buffaloes	Tourism	Blue	English and Afrikaans	146×70
	200 rand	Leopards	Transport and communication	Orange	Afrikaans and English	152×70

=== Fifth series ===
Banknotes of the South African rand (2005 Fifth Issue "English & Other Official Languages")
Image	Value	Obverse	Reverse	Colour	Language	Size (mm)
	10 rand	Rhinoceros	Agriculture	Green	English, Afrikaans, Swati	128×70
	20 rand	Elephants	Mining	Brown	English, Southern Ndebele, Tswana	134×70
	50 rand	Lions	Manufacturing	Red	English, Venda, Xhosa	140×70
	100 rand	Cape buffaloes	Tourism	Blue	English, Northern Sotho, Tsonga	146×70
	200 rand	Leopards	Transport and communication	Orange	English, Sotho, Zulu	152×70

=== Sixth series ===
Banknotes of the South African rand (2012 Sixth Issue "Nelson Mandela")
Image	Value	Obverse	Reverse	Colour	Language	Size (mm)
	10 rand	Nelson Mandela	Rhinoceros	Green	English, Afrikaans, Swati	128×70
	20 rand	Nelson Mandela	Elephant	Brown	English, Southern Ndebele, Tswana	134×70
	50 rand	Nelson Mandela	Lion	Red	English, Venda, Xhosa	140×70
	100 rand	Nelson Mandela	Cape buffalo	Blue	English, Northern Sotho, Tsonga	146×70
	200 rand	Nelson Mandela	Leopard	Orange	English, Sotho, Zulu	152×70

=== Seventh series ===
Banknotes of the South African rand (2018 Seventh Issue "Nelson Mandela Centenary")
Image	Value	Obverse	Reverse	Colour	Language	Size (mm)
	10 rand	Nelson Mandela	Young Mandela and his birthplace of Mvezo	Green	English, Afrikaans, Swati	128×70
	20 rand	Nelson Mandela	Young Mandela and his home in Soweto	Brown	English, Southern Ndebele, Tswana	134×70
	50 rand	Nelson Mandela	Young Mandela and the site of his capture near Howick	Red	English, Venda, Xhosa	140×70
	100 rand	Nelson Mandela	Young Mandela and his place of imprisonment at Robben Island	Blue	English, Northern Sotho, Tsonga	146×70
	200 rand	Nelson Mandela	Young Mandela and his statue at the Union Buildings	Orange	English, Sotho, Zulu	152×70

=== Eighth series ===
Banknotes of the South African rand (2023 Eighth Issue "Big 5 Families")
Image	Value	Obverse	Reverse	Colour	Language	Size (mm)
	10 rand	Nelson Mandela	Rhinoceros	Green	English, Afrikaans, Swati	128×70
	20 rand	Nelson Mandela	Elephant	Brown	English, Tswana, Ndebele	134×70
	50 rand	Nelson Mandela	Lion	Purple	English, Xhosa, Venda	140×70
	100 rand	Nelson Mandela	Cape buffalo	Blue	English, Sepedi, Tsonga	146×70
	200 rand	Nelson Mandela	Leopard	Orange	English, Zulu, Sotho	152×70

== Exchange rate ==
Current ZAR exchange rates
From Google Finance:	AUD CAD CHF CNY EUR GBP HKD JPY USD INR NGN
From Yahoo! Finance:	AUD CAD CHF CNY EUR GBP HKD JPY USD INR NGN
From XE.com:	AUD CAD CHF CNY EUR GBP HKD JPY USD INR NGN
From OANDA:	AUD CAD CHF CNY EUR GBP HKD JPY USD INR NGN

== See also ==
- Financial rand
- Witwatersrand
- Krugerrand
- Coins of the South African rand
- South African pound
- Economy of South Africa

== Note ==
Preceded by: South African pound Reason: decimalisation Ratio: 2 rand = 1 South African pound = 1 British pound	Currency of South Africa; 1961 –			Succeeded by: Current
Preceded by: South African pound Reason: decimalisation Ratio: 2 rand = 1 South African pound = 1 British pound	Currency of South West Africa; 1961 – 1990; Note: administered by/occupied by South Africa since 1915	Currency of Namibia; 1990 – 1993	Legal tender in Namibia; 1993 –	Succeeded by: Namibian dollar Reason: withdrawal from Common Monetary Area; Ratio: at par Note: dollar introduced in 1993, with South African rand remaining legal tender
Preceded by: South African pound Reason: decimalisation Ratio: 2 rand = 1 South African pound = 1 British pound	Currency of Basutoland; 1961 – 1966	Currency of Lesotho; 1966 – 1980	Legal tender in Lesotho; 1980 –	Succeeded by: Lesotho loti Note: loti introduced in 1980, with South African rand remaining legal tender
Preceded by: South African pound Reason: decimalisation Ratio: 2 rand = 1 South African pound = 1 British pound	Currency of Eswatini; 1961 – 1974	Legal tender in Eswatini; 1974 – 1986	Circulates in Eswatini; 1986 –	Succeeded by: Swazi lilangeni Note: lilangeni introduced in 1974. South African rand continues to circulate unofficially
Preceded by: South African pound Reason: decimalisation Ratio: 2 rand = 1 South African pound = 1 British pound	Currency of Bechuanaland Protectorate; 1961 – 1966	Currency of Botswana; 1966 – 1976		Succeeded by: Botswana pula Reason: creation of independent currency
