= The Gazette of Pakistan =

Pakistani official newspaper

- The proclamation of the Queen's title published in The Gazette of Pakistan, 29 May 1953
- Type: Official newspaper
- Owner: Government of Pakistan
- Publisher: Printing Corporation of Pakistan
- Founded: 1948; 78 years ago
- Language: Urdu, English
- Headquarters: Islamabad, Pakistan
- City: Islamabad
- OCLC number: 1761724
- Website: The Gazette of Pakistan

The Gazette of Pakistan (Urdu: سرکاری جریدہَ پاکستان) is the official government gazette of the Government of Pakistan. This Gazette provides information about government acts, ordinances, regulations, orders, S.R.Os, notifications, appointments, promotions, leaves, and awards.

== See also ==
- List of government gazettes
