= Government Printing Press =

- Formation: 1971
- Headquarters: Dhaka, Bangladesh
- Region served: Bangladesh
- Official language: Bengali
- Website: Government Printing Press

Government Printing Press (Bengali: সরকারী প্রিন্টিং প্রেস) is a Bangladesh government owned official printing press.

== History ==
Government Printing Press traces its origin to the Central Press established in 1953 by government of East Pakistan. Created as a department under the Ministry of Industries, it operated under the name of Printing Corporation of Pakistan Press, Dhaka branch. In 1971, after the Independence of Bangladesh it became the Government Printing Press. The press previously had a football team in the Third Division Football League of Bangladesh.

On 10 July 2010, a staff member of Government Printing Press and another of Bangladesh Government Press were arrested for leaking recruitment question papers of teachers in Rangpur. The leak was investigated by the Special Branch of Bangladesh Police.

== See also ==
- Printing Corporation of Pakistan
