= Money in Islam =

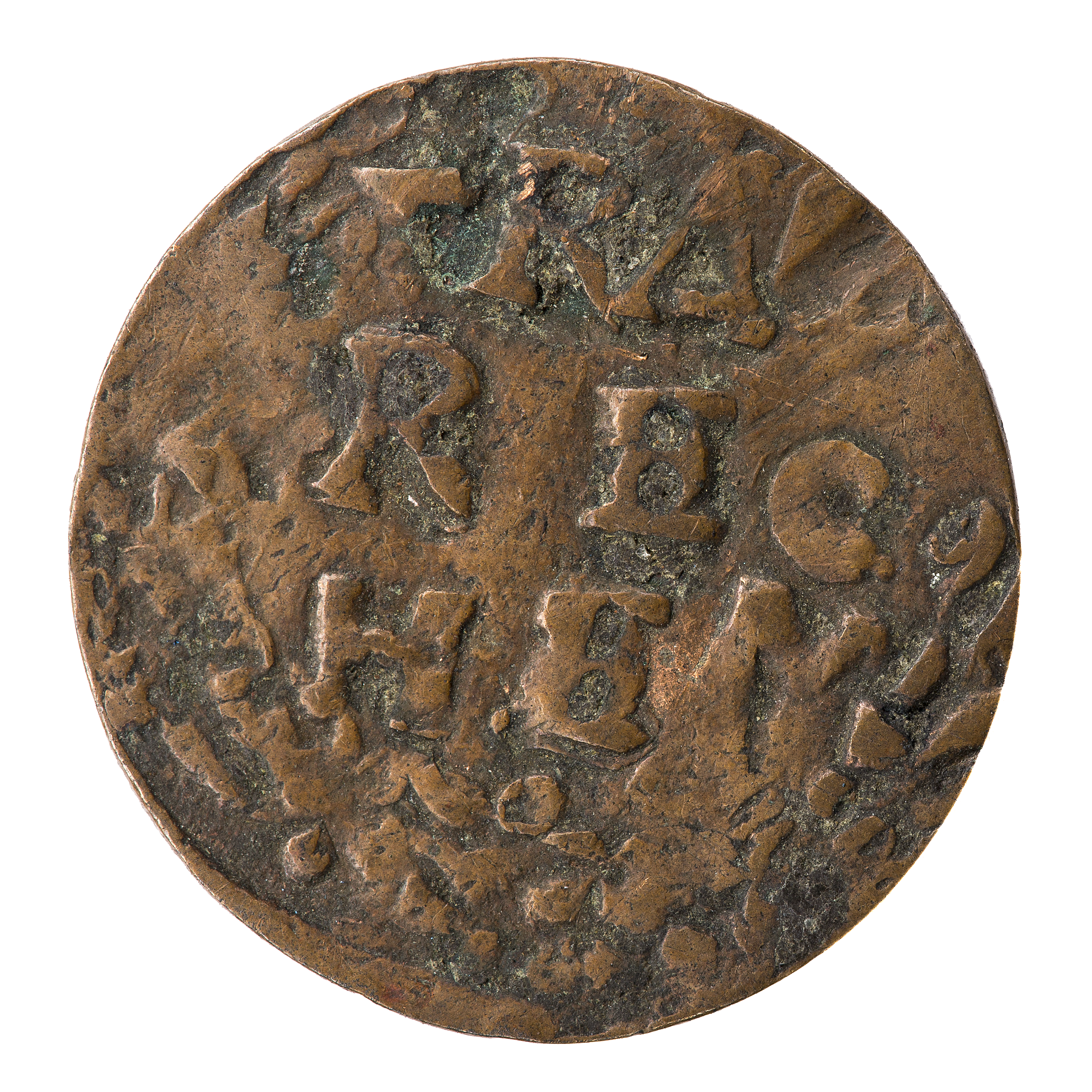
Ancient coin

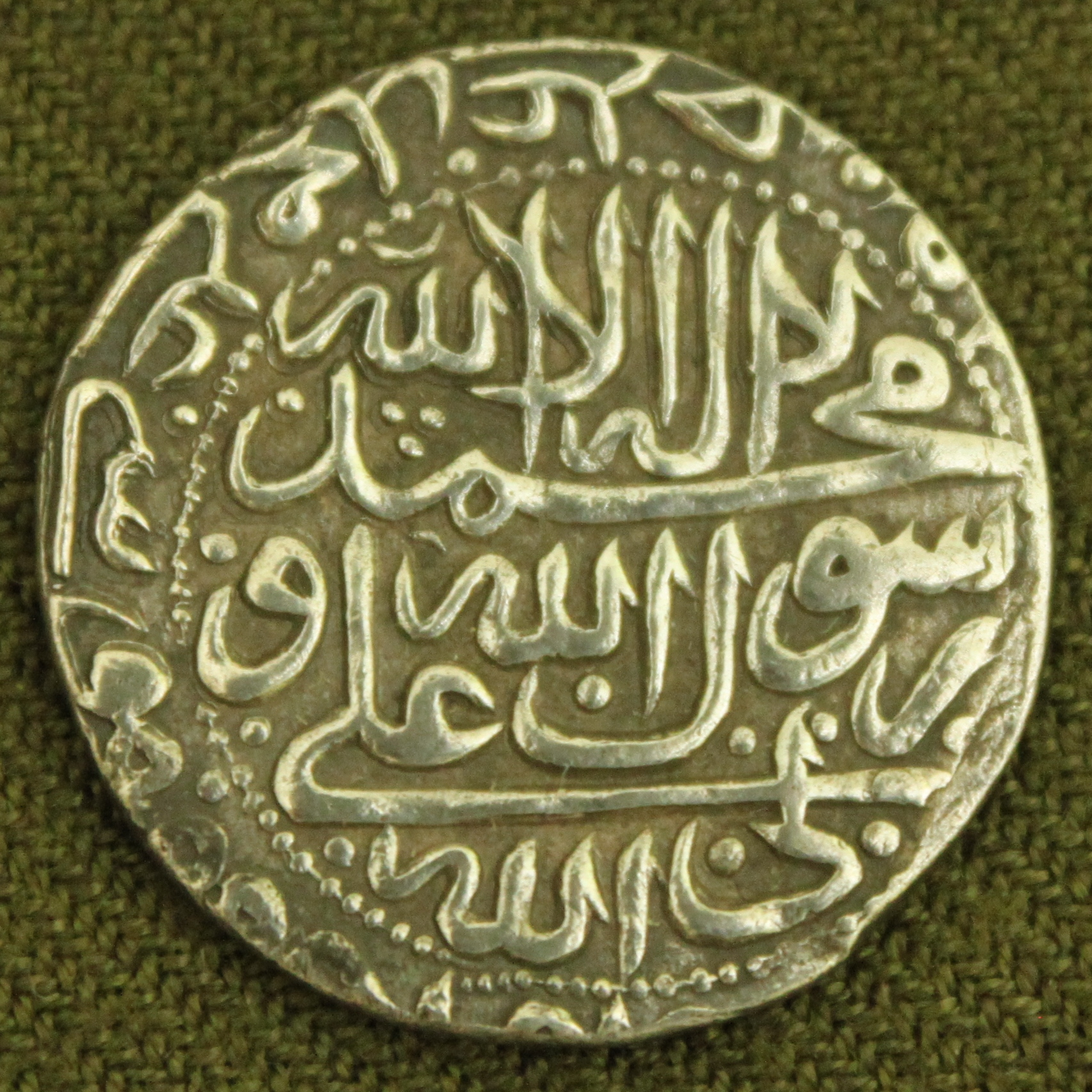
A Safavid coin minted during the reign of Shah Abbas III.

Money in Islam refers to all possessions that hold monetary value, such as livestock, commodities, houses, and buildings. Islam encourages earning wealth through legitimate means (e.g., trade, agriculture, industry, and handicrafts). Conversely, illegal earnings like bribery, fraud, and interest are declared haram (forbidden).

== Qur'an and Hadith ==
Islam, while encouraging spending money in legitimate ways, also forbids extravagance and miserliness. In the Qur'an, Allah says,

And do not make your hand chained to your neck or extend it completely, lest you sit blameworthy and destitute.

— Al-Isra, Ayah: 29

From an Islamic perspective, wealth truly belongs to Allah, and humans are merely its guardians or trustees. Therefore, Islam imposes two conditions regarding wealth,

Following the provisions of Sharia in earning wealth, because people will be questioned on the Day of Judgment. The Prophet of Islam Muhammad said,

The feet of any servant will not move on the Day of Judgment until he is asked... and about his wealth – from where he earned it and where he spent it.

— Sunan al-Tirmidhi, Hadith/2417

Adopting a moderate approach in spending. Allah has forbidden extravagance, as it is a misuse of wealth. At the same time, miserliness is also haram (forbidden), as it is an injustice to the soul and contrary to the spirit of social empathy. In the Qur'an, Allah says,

And those who, when they spend, do so not excessively or stingily but are moderate between the two.

— Al-Furqan, Ayah: 67

== Categories of wealth in Islam ==
According to Fiqh, wealth is categorized into the following classes based on various aspects:

- Accountability:This refers to wealth that can be possessed and used in a Sharia-compliant manner, with ease and preference.
- Equivalence: This is divided into two types—
  - Valuable assets (whose equivalent is not readily available in the market, e.g., livestock), and
  - Fungible assets (whose value is ascertainable and readily available in the market).
- Stability: This includes
  - Immovable assets (which are not transferable) and
  - Movable assets (which are transferable).
- Separability of benefit: This refers to assets whose benefit is intrinsically linked to the original item; meaning, they are consumed through use.
- Physical nature: This is divided into three types—
  - Tangible assets (which are physically touchable),
  - Usufructuary assets (which derive benefit from the use of an object), and
  - Financial rights (e.g., patent rights).
- Utility of ownership:
  - Public assets (e.g., Waqf), and
  - Private assets (which can be privately owned).
- Purpose:
  - Usable assets (for personal use),
  - Commercial assets, and
  - Investment assets.
- Presence:
  - Existing assets (assets that are visible), and
  - Debt assets (which are proven as liabilities on someone).
- Individuality:
  - Distinct assets (whose owner is specified), and
  - Undivided assets (whose ownership share is determined through shares).
- Value bearing: This refers to monetary value or market price.
  - Valuable assets and
  - Commodities.

== The role of money in Islam ==
Islam permits the use of wealth to acquire more assets through legitimate means, opening avenues that contribute to social justice and community development, such as:

1. Preservation of national and individual wealth: Islam encourages investing wealth to increase it and prohibits hoarding it or preventing its circulation. Islam forbids unjustly consuming people's wealth, which hinders societal progress.
2. Achieving solidarity and social empathy: Islam calls for spending in the way of Allah, considering it a profitable loan for which an excellent reward will be given on the Day of Judgment. Islam has made Zakat obligatory and legislated inheritance laws to prevent wealth from concentrating in the hands of a few.

The functions of wealth in Islam are:

1. Preservation of national and individual wealth.
2. Achieving solidarity and social empathy.
3. Social justice.
4. Community development.

== Islamic view on currency and market ==
The free market principle is an Islamic principle as cited per the primary islamic source in the Quran. Islam considers commodities with intrinsic value as currency. The following are some examples of commodities that can be used as currency: gold (as Gold Dinar), silver (as Silver Dirham), dates, wheat, barley, and salt. The mentioned six items are derived from a hadith i.e. gold, silver, dates, wheat, barley, and salt and were used as money in barter system. As the items mentioned in hadith, therefore, also known as Sunnah money.

Paper money or electronic money can be used, as long as, it is backed by one of these commodities at a fixed exchange rate (in other words the paper is just a contract stipulating that the bearer can redeem the paper for a fixed measure (weight) of that particular commodity). Until 1971, most currencies of the world were backed by gold. However, only governments could redeem paper, not the average citizen.

The price of a commodity is set by the market as long as fiat currency (paper) is not used. On the other hand, the price/value of commodities can be manipulated/adjusted by the creators of fiat money (by virtue of the market law of supply and demand).

== See also ==
- SAMA Money Museum
- The Security Printing Corporation (Bangladesh) Ltd.
