= Bangladesh Forms and Publication Office =

Bangladesh government department handling official documentation

- Formation: 1972
- Headquarters: Tejgaon, Dhaka, Bangladesh
- Region served: Bangladesh
- Official language: Bengali
- Website: Bangladesh Forms and Publication Office

Bangladesh Forms and Publication Office (Bengali: বাংলাদেশ ফর্ম ও প্রকাশনা অফিস) is a Bangladesh government department under the Ministry of Public Administration. The department is responsible for supplying official documents including land registration certificates, marriage certificates, money receipts, etc. to government offices.

== History ==
Bangladesh Forms and Publication Office started an part of the East Pakistan Government Press. After the Independence of Bangladesh in 1972 it was separated from the Bangladesh Government Press and renamed Bangladesh Forms and Publication Office.
