= The Security Printing Corporation (Bangladesh) Ltd. =

Government owned body

- Logo of Security Printing Corporation (Bangladesh) Ltd.

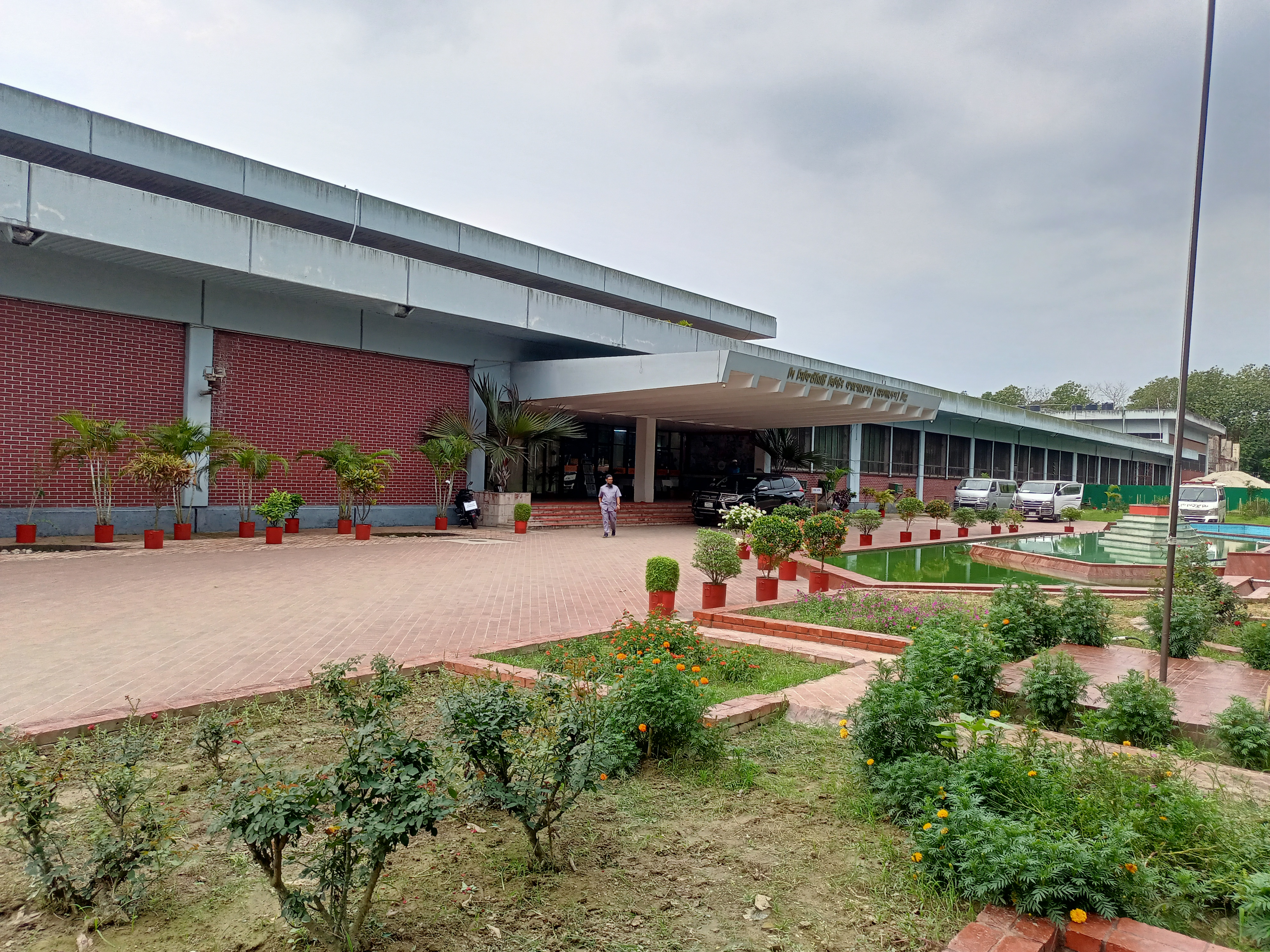
- Native name: দি সিকিউরিটি প্রিন্টিং কর্পোরেশন (বাংলাদেশ) লিমিটেড
- Industry: Printing press (security printing)
- Founded: 1988
- Headquarters: Gazipur, Bangladesh, 24.034114°N 90.409334°E
- Key people: Safayat Arefin (Managing Director)
- Products: Banknotes, government postal stamps
- Net income: 2026: $15.8 million dollar (196.93 crore BDT)
- Number of employees: 800+
- Parent: Bangladesh Bank
- Website: spcbl.portal.gov.bd

The Security Printing Corporation (Bangladesh) Ltd. (SPCBL; Bengali: দি সিকিউরিটি প্রিন্টিং কর্পোরেশন (বাংলাদেশ) লিমিটেড) is the main printer of banknotes and government postal stamps in Bangladesh.

== History and description ==
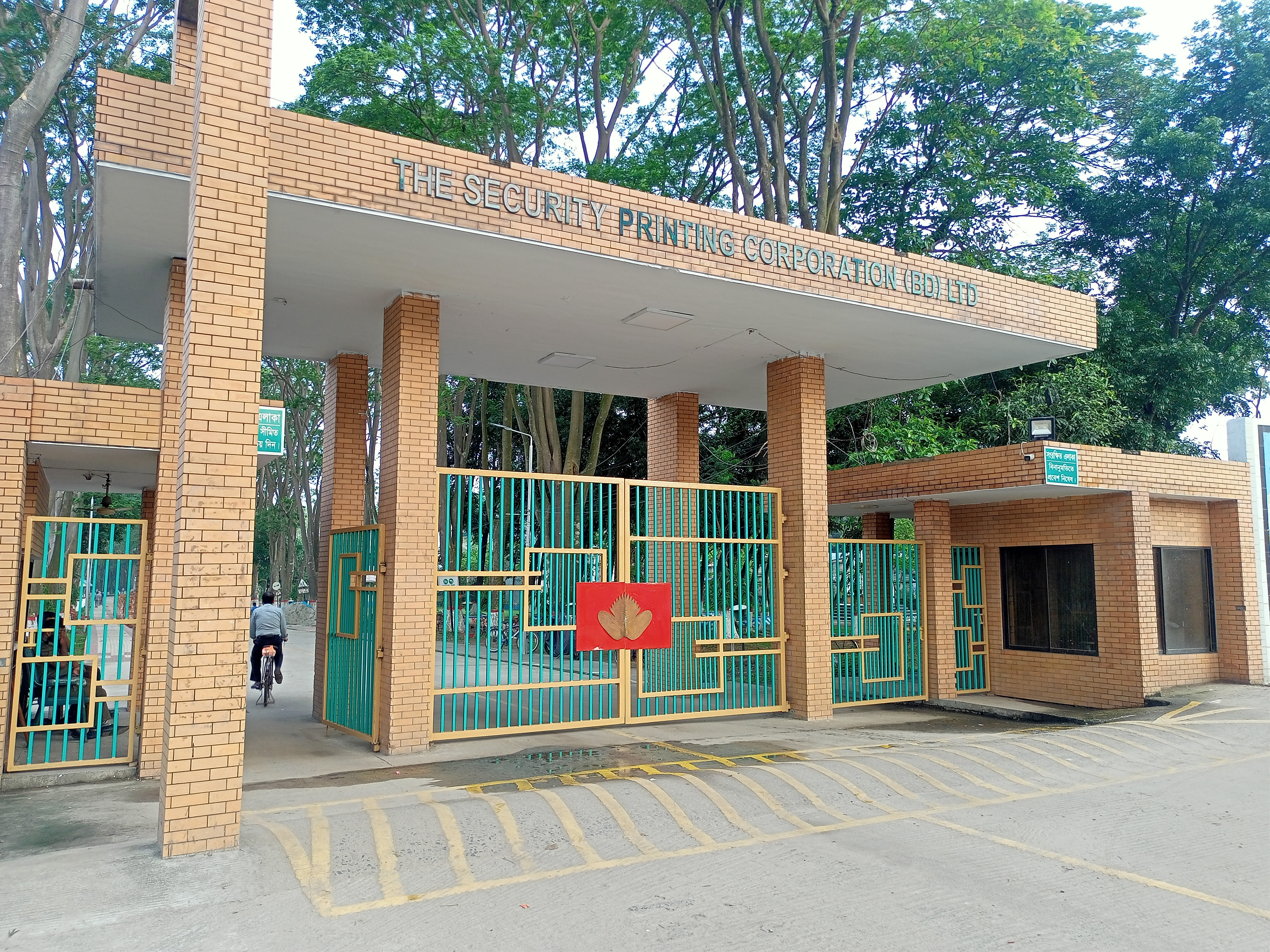
Office entrance, May 2026

Established in 1988, it started operating as a project of the Bangladesh Bank. Since April 1992, it has been running as an autonomous organization constituted under the existing law of the country. It is the regular member of International Government Printers Association. Its clients for high-quality four-color postage stamps include Nepal. Located on a secured 66-acre site in Gazipur, the facility officially commenced operations in 1989. While it prints all Bangladeshi banknotes and commemorative notes through a meticulous 30-stage process, the facility does not produce metallic coins, as coin minting is not economically viable domestically. Beyond paper currency, the corporation prints various government revenue and security instruments, including savings certificates, judicial and revenue stamps, commemorative stamps, bank checkbooks, and academic certificates for various education boards. Fully funded by the Bangladesh Bank, the institution is governed by a seven-member board of directors led by the Governor of the central bank, and maintains stringent, high-level security protocols due to its sensitive national status.

== Products ==
Coins, banknotes and related others

- 1 Taka, 2 Taka, 2 Taka Doel, 5 Taka
- 5 Taka Old, 5 Taka In, 10 Taka Old, 10 Taka In
- 10 Taka Old, 10 Taka Odel 1, 20 Taka, 20 Taka Old
- 50 Taka, 50 Taka Old, 50 Taka Old 1, 70 Taka, 100 Taka N
- 100 Taka O, 100 Taka Old, 100 Taka
- 500 Taka N, 500 Taka O, 500 Taka O, 500 Taka O 1
- 1000 Taka B N N, 1000 Taka O,
- Prize Bonds, 25 Taka, 40 Taka, 60 Taka,

Others

- Postage and Revenue Stamps
- Postal Envelopes
- Postcards
- Non-Judicial Stamps
- Court Fee Stamps
- Cheque Books and Schedules and Other Security Items of Private Banks
- Share Certificates
- Treasury Bonds
- Academic Certificates
- Bidi Bands Rolls (Tax Labels)
- Bands (Tax Labels) for Stamps and Cigarette Boxes
- Bands (Tax Labels) for Toilet Soap Packets
- Tax Labels for Vehicle Route Permits, Vehicle Fitness and Vehicle Taxes

The organization's 25th anniversary in 2013 was commemorated by the Bangladesh Bank issuing a ৳25 note showing its headquarters on the reverse.

=== Latest series ===
Following the fall of Awami League in the July Revolution in 2024, the Bangladesh Bank announced plans to redesign Taka banknotes by 2025. The central bank's Currency and Design Advisory Committee, made up of nine members was selected to submit theme proposals to the Ministry of Finance. Sheikh Mujib's portrait was removed and graffiti of the July Revolution was added in this series.

- Security Features: The new notes include advanced security features such as colour-changing thread, microprinting, see-through pattern and optically variable ink. The taka note alone has 10 security features.

Eleventh Series
Image		Value	Main Color	Description		First Issue
Obverse	Reverse	Value	Main Color	Obverse	Reverse	First Issue
		৳2	Light Green	Martyred Intellectuals Memorial, Mirpur	Martyred Intellectuals Memorial, Rayer Bazar	2 June 2025
		৳5	Pink	Star Mosque	Graffiti of the July Revolution	2 June 2025
		৳10	Pink	Baitul Mukarram National Mosque	Graffiti of the July Revolution	2 June 2025
		৳20	Cyan	Kantajew Temple	Somapura Mahavihara	1 June 2025
		৳50	Deep Brown	Ahsan Manzil	The Struggle by Zainul Abedin	1 June 2025
		৳100	Sky Blue	Sixty Dome Mosque	The Sundarbans	2 June 2025
		৳200	Golden Yellow	Aparajeyo Bangla	Graffiti of the July Revolution	2 June 2025
		৳500	Olive Green	Central Shaheed Minar	Bangladesh Supreme Court	1 June 2025
		৳1000	Violet	National Martyrs' Memorial	Jatiya Sangsad Bhaban	1 June 2025

== Process, cost and security of printing money ==
The banknote papers are made of cotton, which are imported from foreign countries, including Uzbekistan, PT Pura of Indonesia and other European countries, printing machines are also imported from Europe, and the inks including optically variable ink are imported from Germany and SICPA of Switzerland. The first batch of machines (purchased from Germany KBA-Notasys Swiss) were delivered in 2001 and in the second phase, in 2010 and 2014, two money printing machines called 'Intaglio Printing Machine' were purchased from the German company KBA-Notasys Swiss. The machine purchased in 2010 cost about 124 crore taka and the machine purchased in 2014 cost 142 crore taka, 4 machines were purchased at a cost of 1150-1200 crore taka. The average annual cost of printing banknotes of various denominations issued by Bangladesh Bank by the institution is around 4 billion taka to 5 billion taka. The leading designers are appointed for designing the money, the most prominent of whom was Muslim Mia. A 2022 report said that the Bangladesh government spends about 8 taka to print a 1,000 taka note. The cost of printing a 500 taka note is about 6 taka, and the average cost of printing each of the 5, 10, 20, and 50 taka notes is about 3 taka. In March 2025, Bangladesh Bank said that it costs five taka to print a 1,000 taka note and four taka 70 paisa to print a 500 taka note. In addition, the 200 taka note costs three taka 20 paisa, the 100 taka note costs four taka, and all 10, 20, and 50 taka notes cost one and a half taka. And the cost of printing five taka and two taka notes is one taka 40 paisa. After printing the money, each bundle is counted both by hand and by machine.

== Criticism ==
=== Corruption allegations ===
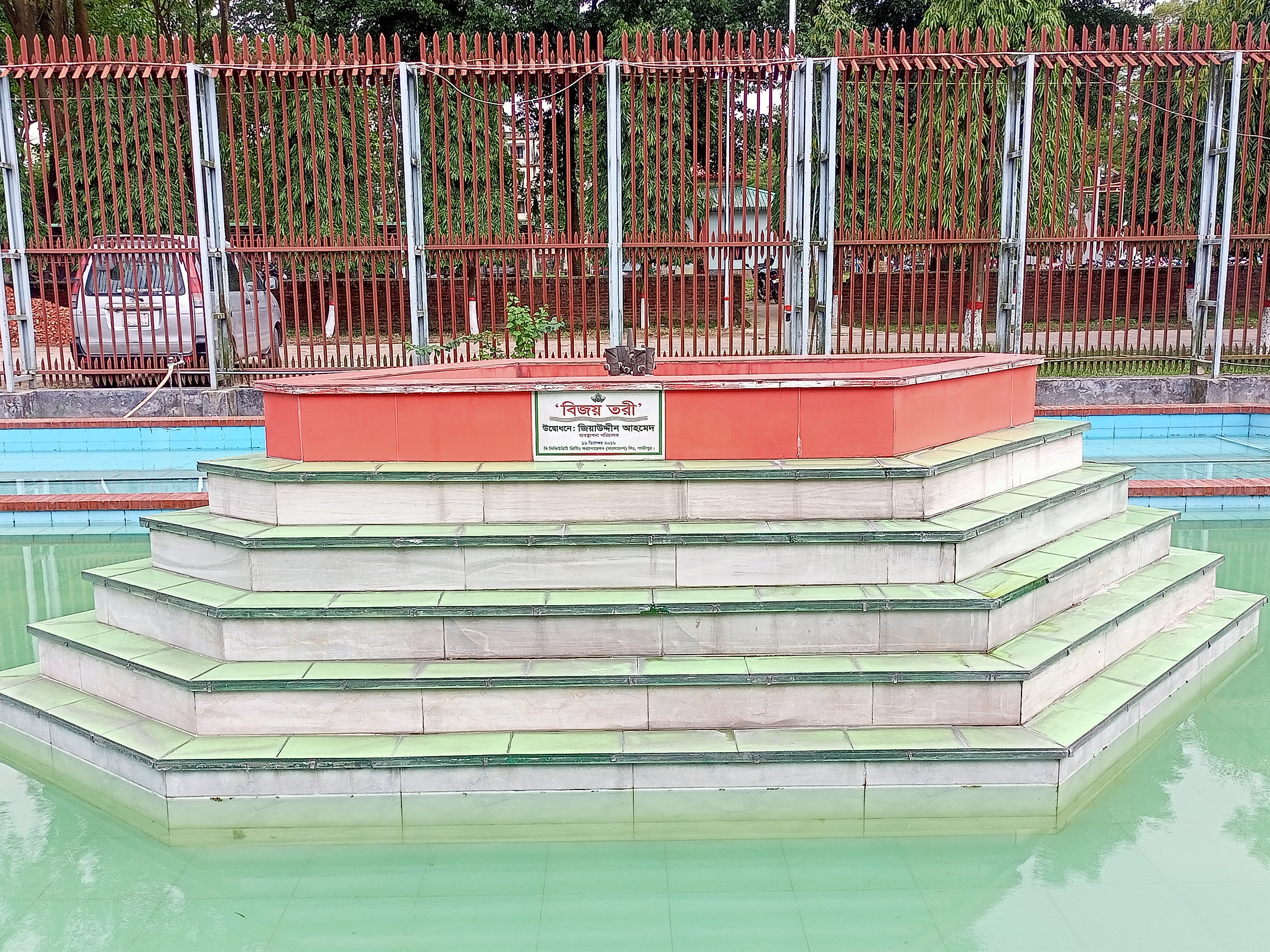
Bijoy Tori (Victory boat), on 16 December 2016, the then Managing Director Ziauddin Ahmed inaugurated it in the office premises, built with the support of the contemporary Awami League government. After the political change after 5 August 2024, it was removed as it resembled the Awami League boat symbol.

There are various allegations against the officials of the organisation, including becoming millionaires through corruption. In a report submitted by the Department of Posts on 2 December 2024, in response to a court order in a non-judicial stamp forgery case filed against Simin Rahman of Transcom Group in December 2024, the Assistant Controller of Stamps, Shuvro Sutradhar, confirmed that the stamps in question were issued by Security Printing Corporation (Bangladesh) Limited in May 2023. On May 18, 2025, Elias Hossain's YouTube investigative report program called Fifteen Minutes showed that when Elias sent his own reporter to the organization to question about the fraud, the matter was ignored. A news report claims that none of the 714 officers and employees working at the company have the minimum educational training in currency engineering technology or security printing technology. In 2024, the DB suspected and monitored the institution for fraudulent certification of the Technical Education Board.

==== Managing director ====
In addition, in 2016, there were multiple allegations of corruption in the appointment of its Managing Director, where it was claimed that an official named Ziauddin Ahmed was lobbied to be reappointed as Managing Director after his term expired, on the recommendation of the then Finance Minister Abul Mal Abdul Muhith, against whom there were many allegations of corruption related to the appointment and purchase of equipment and parts, one of which was to create his own ring to take control of the company and let them manage everything, to raise fake bills by showing the import of parts worth about one crore taka in the name of repairing MICR machines, to purchase two rotary numbering machines worth 10 lakh taka each for 6 million taka, to purchase a cutting finishing machine worth 25/30 lakh taka for 2 million taka in collusion with the business firm Graphic Associates, to purchase a comb perforating machine worth 50/60 lakh taka for 3 million taka by showing fake documents of board members, to conceal the information of the company's 3 crore taka FDR deposited in Oriental Bank in 2003 with illegal benefits, to hide the information of 10 million taka Re-starting the intaglio printing of high-value notes, causing economic losses and taking commissions from businessmen, removing 3 officers with high degrees in chemistry from the research and quality control department to pass the humanities department to determine the quality of low-quality paper and ink, paying bribes to the auditor general's office to settle various irregularities in audit objections, cutting down trees of the corporation, looting fish from the lake by giving them to himself and his relatives, embezzling money by showing the attendance of workers who work on a daily basis, disrupting proper supervision of the organization and collapsing the organization's production due to being busy with various irregularities, hiring more than a hundred people in a year and purchasing and repairing new machines at a cost of crores of taka, requesting the finance minister to be reappointed as some more time is needed to cover up these irregularities, etc. In addition, before the end of the term of the Managing Director, the name of a criticized official named Bishnupada Saha from Bangladesh Bank was proposed for the position. In 2018, the Central Bank Governor Fazle Kabir and a contracting company were accused of lobbying to keep the company's managing director, Sheikh Azizul Haque, in his position even after his retirement period ended, with the aim of committing tender-related corruption. After 5 August 2024, allegations were made against former Bangladesh Bank Governor Abdur Rouf Talukder and several senior officials of the institution, Ashraful Alam and Forkan Hossain, for corruptly printing notes worth 60,000 crore taka during the Awami League era.

=== Allegation of militant involvement ===
On October 8, 2023, a person named Yusuf Ali Sarkar, who worked at the organization, was arrested on charges of involvement with the militant organization Ansar Al Islam.

=== Association in making counterfeit money ===
On 1 October 2025 Zulkarnain Saer After revealing the secret release of fake notes worth two lakh crore taka, which were produced in India on 5 August 2024, Jugantor in an investigative report claimed that the secret involvement of the pro-Awami League officials and employees of the mint was with them; According to them, many machines and parts used in the Bangladesh mint are made in India, and those concerned believe that those machines can also be used for this purpose; They suspect especially since the paper used in the fake currency and the paper of the Bangladesh banknotes are the same. Awami craftsmen, including the former designer of the money making at the mint, are among the suspects in making the huge amount of fake notes, who have been printing fake money for a long time under the supervision of the intelligence agencies. According to the sources concerned, the fake paper coins, which are perfectly made in the style of the notes printed at the Bangladesh mint, are being smuggled to Bangladesh after being manufactured in neighboring countries by the intelligence agencies. After that, they are being passed around to retailers. Some fugitive Awami League leaders in India are directly involved in the ring of making fake notes and sending them to the country with the intelligence agencies. The ring formed by the combination of the two parties has created a new chain. From dealers to retailers, everyone there is a follower of their ideology. An official, who did not want to be named, said that if the work was done by the state, it would not have been possible for anyone to stop it. Because, most of the officials and employees appointed in the mint in the last 15 years were followers of the Awami ideology. Many machineries have also been taken from a neighboring country. He said that the craftsmen who designed the money, who retired in the last one to one and a half years; they can be brought under surveillance.

== Other features ==
There is a money meuseum inside the organization's official building.

== Gallery ==
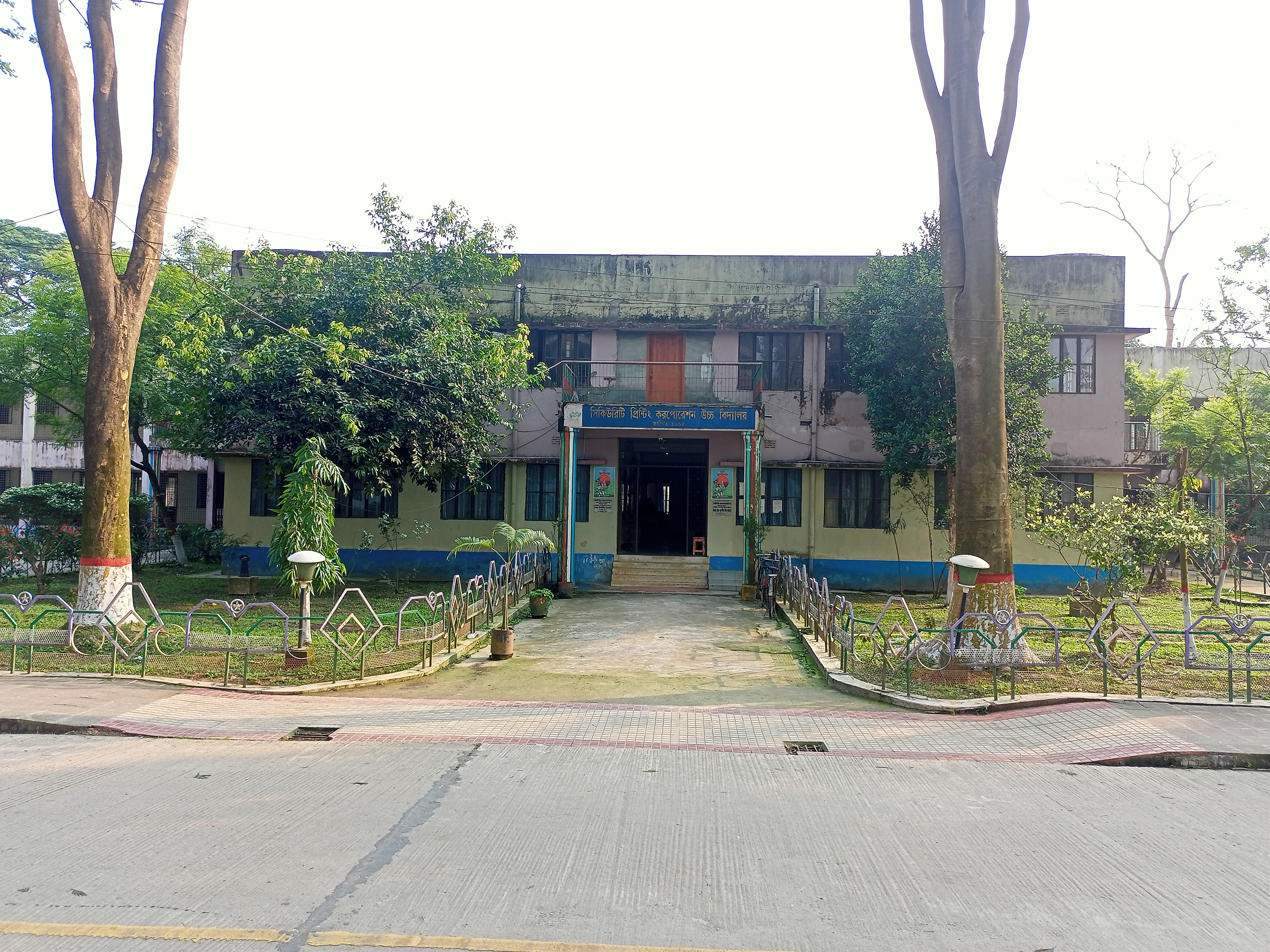
The main gate of the SPC High School run by the organization

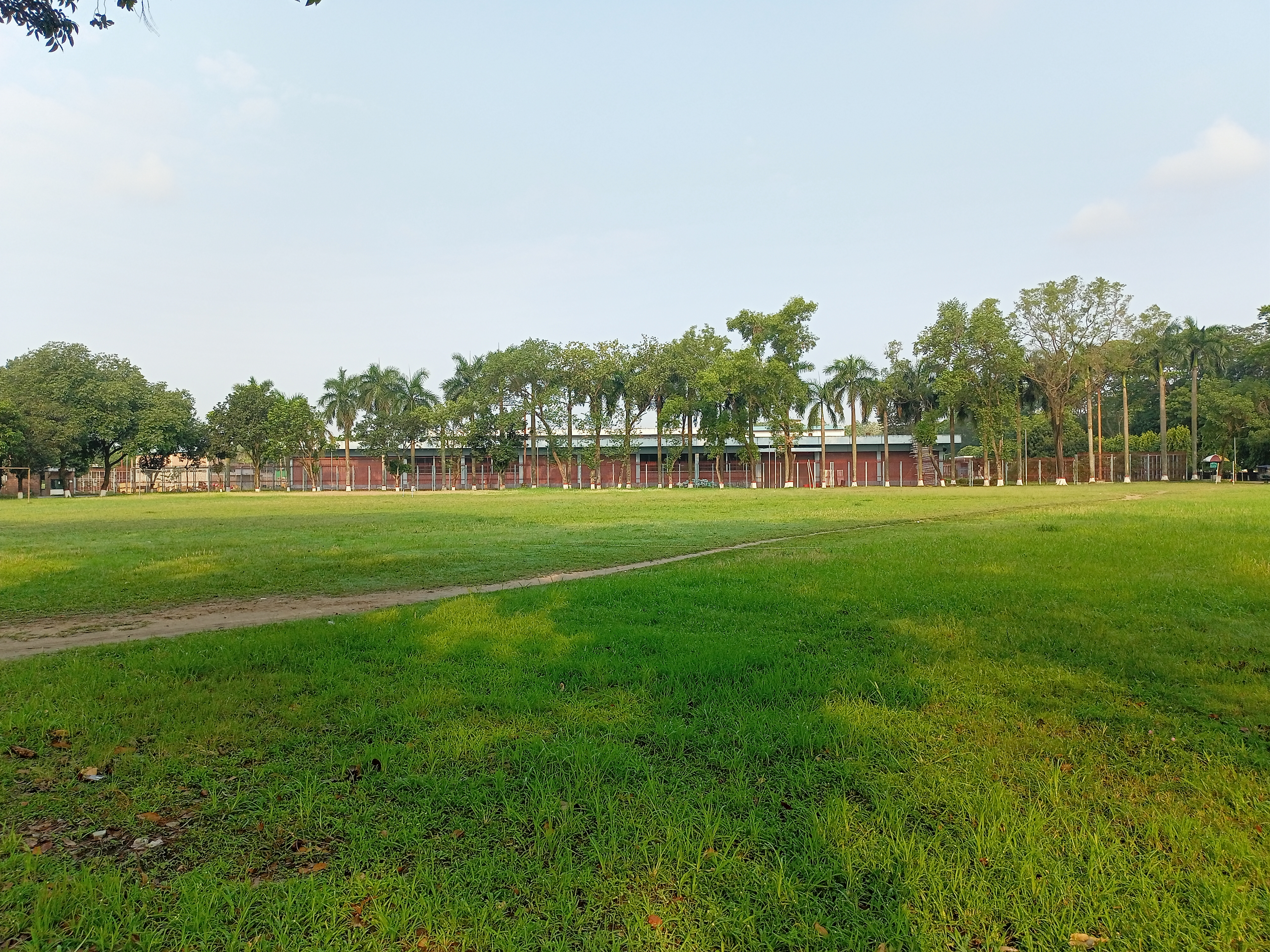
East side of institutional and office buildings

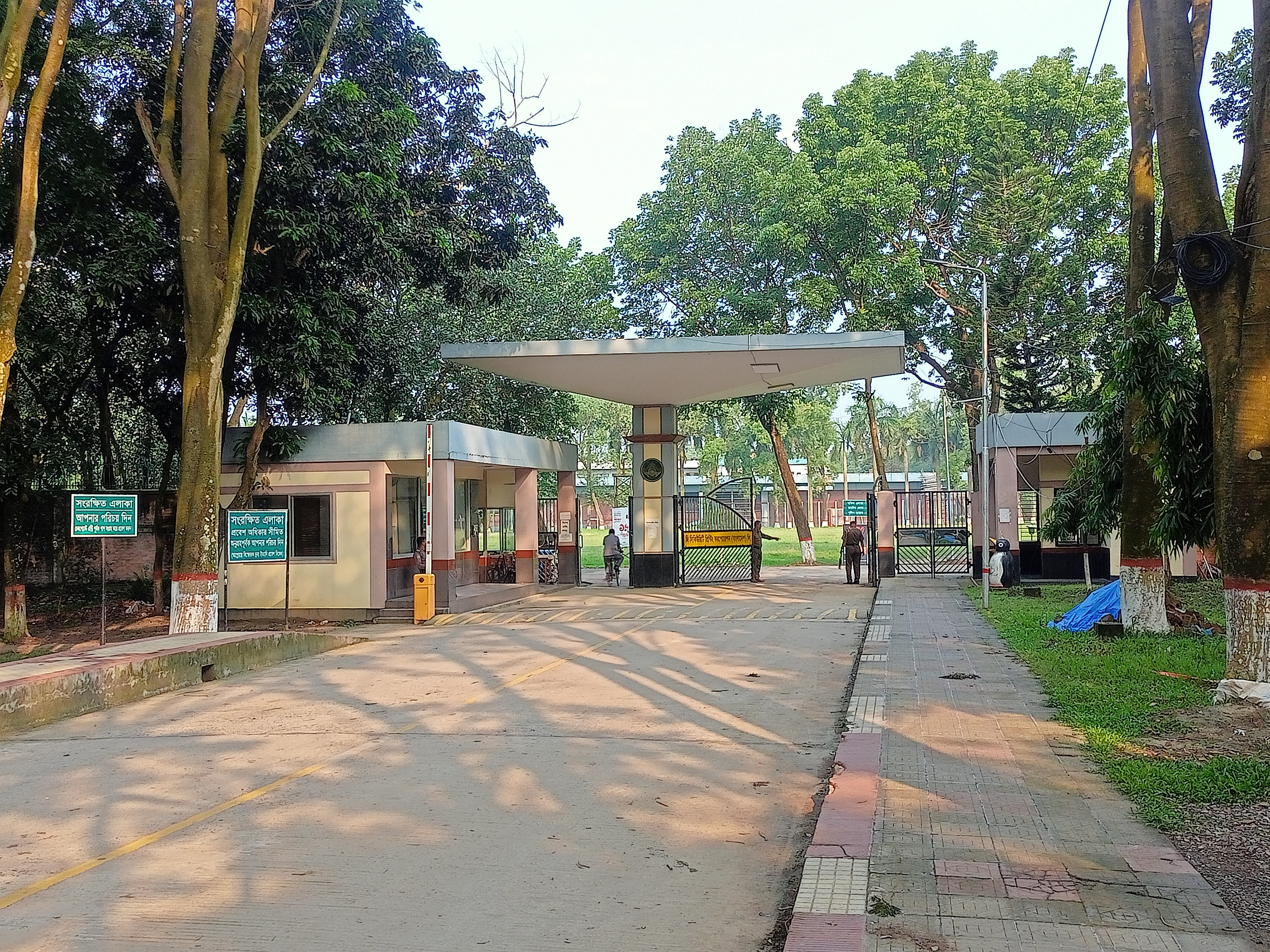
Institutional 2nd security gate

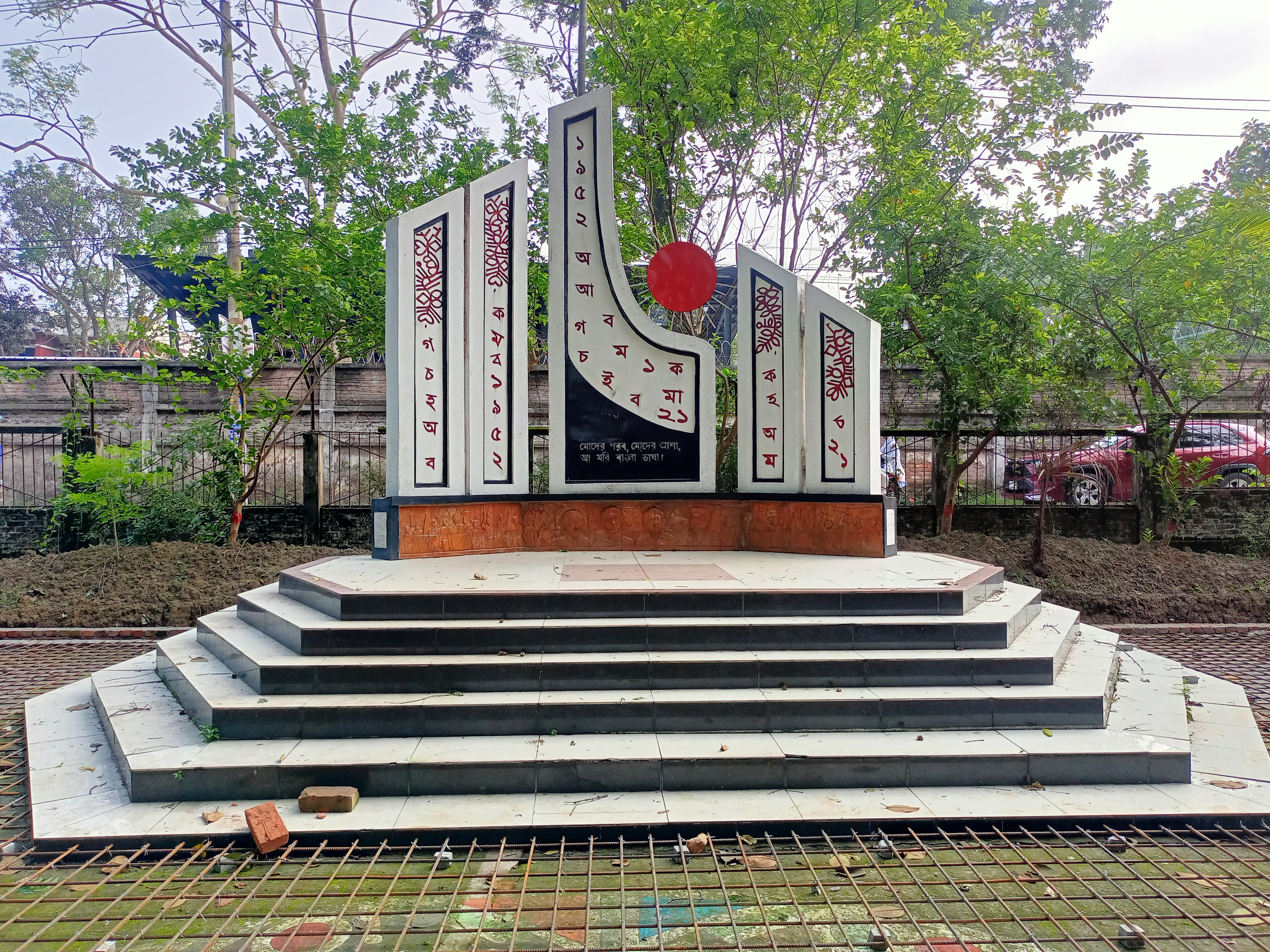
Institutional Language martyr relics

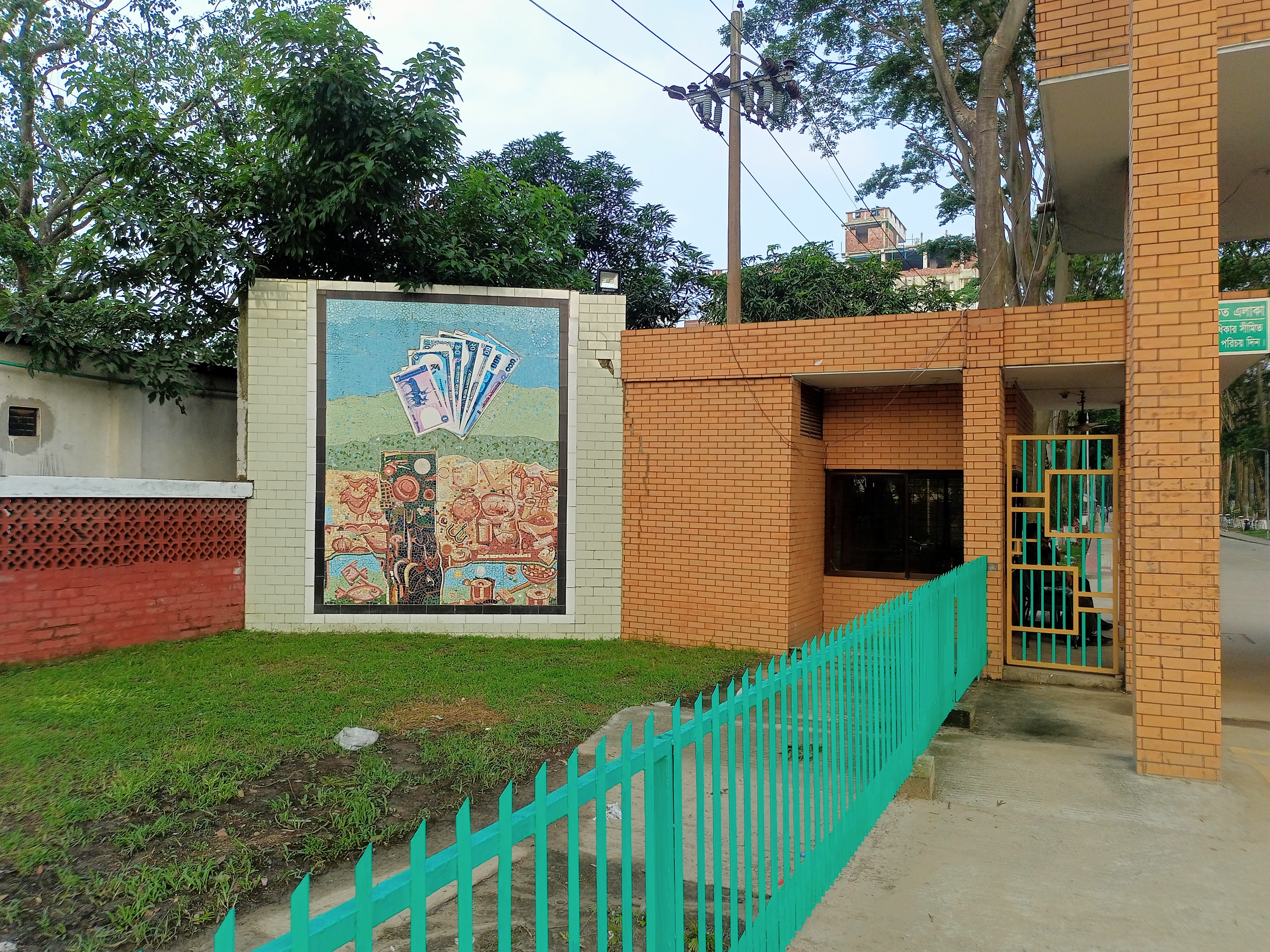
Tiled mural of the 1st gate (left)

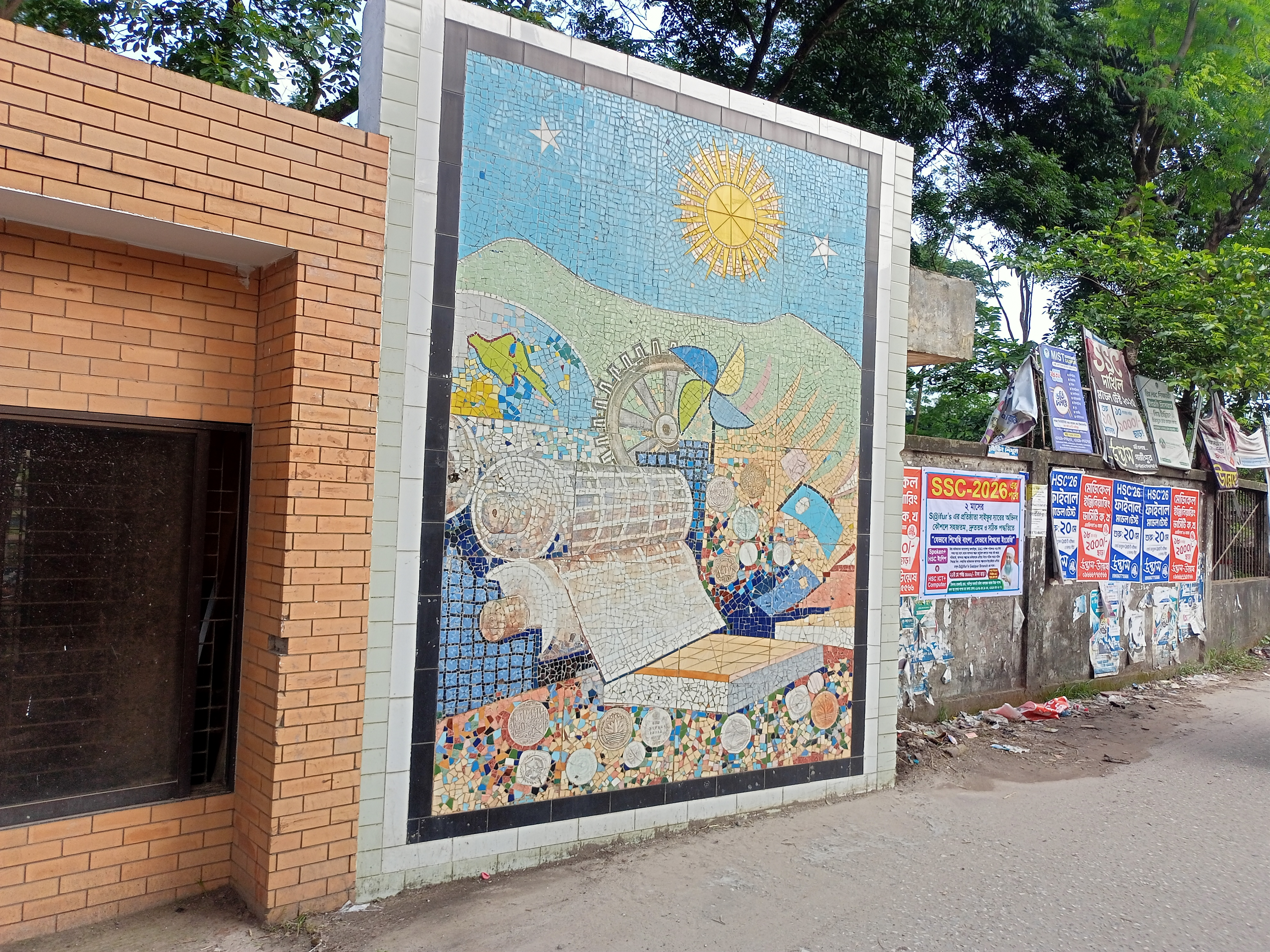
Tiled mural of the 1st gate (right)

== See also ==
- Bangladesh Machine Tools Factory
- Bangladesh Government Press
- Bangladesh Bank
- Banking in Bangladesh
- Department of Printing and Publications
- List of banknote printers
- Security Printing and Minting Corporation of India
- Pakistan Security Printing Corporation
- SAMA Money Museum
- Islamic banking and finance
- Islamic economics
- Money in Islam
- Riba
- Nepotism
- Bangladesh Bank robbery
- Cronyism
- Populism
- Corruption in Bangladesh
- Militancy in the name of Islam
