= Question paper leaks in Bangladesh =

Illegal sharing of examination papers in Bangladesh

According to the government of Bangladesh, the first question paper leak from any public examination happened in 1979, during the Secondary School Certificate (SSC) examination period. However, leaks have become more frequent since 2014. Question papers of other public examinations such as the Primary School Certificate (PSC), Junior School Certificate (JSC), Secondary School Certificate (SSC) and Higher Secondary School Certificate (HSC) have been leaked in a regular basis. There have also been multiple university and medical entrance exam question paper leaks.

== Incidents ==
=== Certificate examinations ===
In 2014, question papers from all Bangladesh public examinations were leaked but the government initially denied this allegation. However, after a few days, Minister of Education of Bangladesh Nurul Islam Nahid declared quick action would be taken against people involved in question paper leaks.

During the 2014 HSC examination period, the English exam schedule of Dhaka Board was changed due to leaks. Other tests' question papers were leaked but no further action was taken.

=== Admission tests ===
There were allegations of medical and dental entrance test question paper leaks in 2015. The Health Minister Mohammad Nasim denied this allegation. An inquiry team was established which confirmed the allegations and suggested the entrance test be retaken. Students and renowned Bangladesh educators like Muhammad Zafar Iqbal and Syed Abul Maksud protested against the leak and demanded the test be retaken, but no action was taken. The demonstration was described as 'illogical' and the Health Minister Mohammad Nasim described the demonstrations as hype.

In 2018, the question paper of Dhaka University D unit (Gha Unit) entrance test was allegedly leaked. The government denied this allegation.

In 2020, the Criminal Investigation Department (CID) of police said that at least 4,000 students were admitted to several medical and dental colleges through answering the question papers leaked by a gang from 2013 to 2018.

== Criticism and reaction ==
Bangladesh people and educators have criticized the leaks. In 2014, scientist and writer Muhammad Zafar Iqbal protested at the Central Shaheed Minar against an alleged leak and the government's silence.

In 2015, there was a massive student demonstration against medical and dental entrance test leaks. Educator and columnist Syed Abul Maksud joined this demonstration and demanded the test be retaken.

The Bangladesh Government had several meetings with Bangladesh educators to prevent question paper leaks. The government briefly shut down mobile internet access in 2018 in an attempt to avoid the leaking of questions, but the measure was unsuccessful.

== Law and punishment ==
Leaking and distribution of any public examination question paper is a crime under Bangladesh law. According to 'The Public Examinations (Offences) (Amended) Act, 1992' the punishment is a 3-10 year prison term. Many people have been arrested in relation to question paper leaks. On 2017, a government official was arrested for being involved with a medical and dental entrance test question paper leak. However, no-one has been punished over this incident.
