= Syed Abul Maksud =

Bangladeshi journalist (1946–2021)

- সৈয়দ আবুল মকসুদ
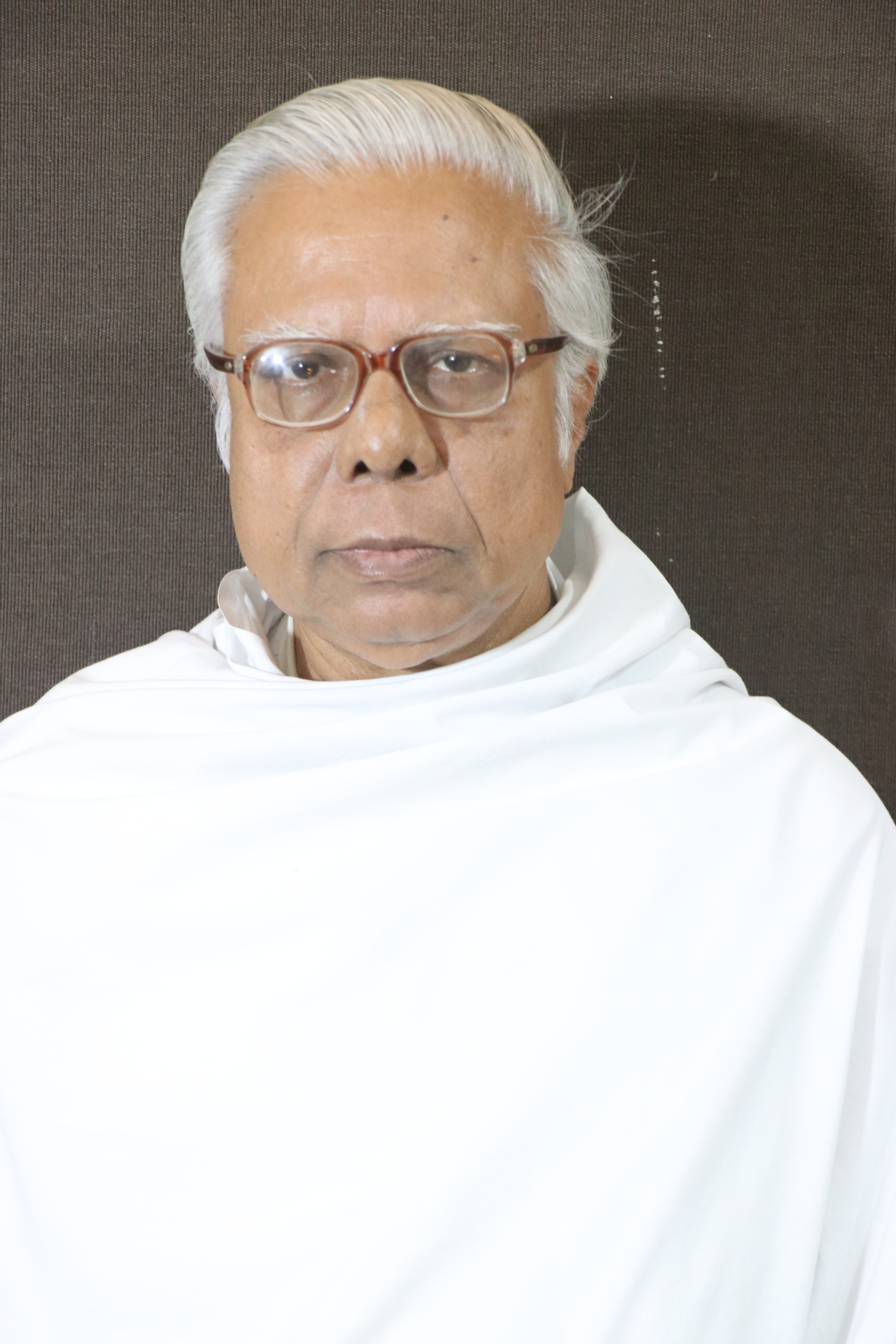
- Born: 23 October 1946; Elachipur, Manikganj, Bengal Presidency, British India (now in Bangladesh)
- Died: 23 February 2021 (aged 74); Dhaka, Bangladesh
- Education: University of Dhaka
- Occupations: Writer; scholar
- Awards: Bangla Academy Literary Award

Syed Abul Maksud (23 October 1946 – 23 February 2021) was a Bangladeshi journalist, columnist, research scholar, essayist, and writer. He was acclaimed for his critical and research work. He was a regular contributor to the Daily Prothom Alo. The Bangla Dictionary of Writers stats that his essays on literature, society, culture and politics are much appreciated for his clear view, lucid language and simple style. He carried out substantive research works on "the lives of famous litterateurs such as Rabindranath Tagore, Buddhadeva Bose", Mohandas Karamchand Gandhi, Syed Waliullah etc. His Journal of Germany is a popular travel book. In 1995, he was awarded Bangla Academy Literary Award by Bangla Academy for his contributions to Bengali Literature.

== Death ==
Maksud died at the age of 74 on the way to the hospital after falling ill on 23 February 2021.

== Selected publications ==
- Juddha O Manusher Murkhata (1988)
- Maulana Abdul Hamid Khan Bhasanir jiban, Karmakanda, rajniti o darshan (1986)
- Gandhi, Nehru and Noakhali (2008)
- Dhakar Buddhadeb Basu (2011)
- Dhaka University & Higher Education in Bangladesh (2016)
- Syed Waliullah'r Jibon O Sahitya
- Rabindranather Dharmatattwa O Darshan (2012)
