= Bangladesh Stationery Office =

Government Agency of Bangladesh

- Formation: 1972
- Headquarters: Dhaka, Bangladesh
- Region served: Bangladesh
- Official language: Bengali
- Website: www.dpp.gov.bd/bso

The Bangladesh Stationery Office (Bengali: বাংলাদেশ স্টেশনারী অফিস) is a Bangladesh government agency responsible for supplying stationery to government offices throughout Bangladesh.

== History ==
The Bangladesh Stationery Office started as an office at the Bhawal Raj Building of Bhawal Estate in Gazipur. It was shifted to a rented house in Dhaka under the name of Central Stationery Depot. It moved to a permanent location in Tejgaon soon after. It was called the Pakistan Central Stationery Depot, Dhaka. After the Independence of Bangladesh it was renamed to Bangladesh Stationery Office. It was responsible for supplying all stationery products for government offices till 1985 when its duties were divided among four different zonal offices. The four zonal officers under it are Bogra, Chittagong, Dhaka and Khulna regional offices.

On 17 September 2017, the Daily Sun criticized a move by the Bangladesh Stationery Office to contract to the fourth bidder. The tender was for the procurement of paper for the upcoming national elections in Bangladesh. According to the Daily Sun, by picking the fourth bidder 66 million more than would have paid if they picked the lowest bidder.
