= South African Bank Note Company =

Bank Note Printer in South Africa

- Industry: Printing
- Founded: 1958
- Headquarters: Pretoria, Gauteng
- Products: Bank notes
- Parent: South African Reserve Bank
- Website: www.sabanknote.co.za

The South African Bank Note Company (SABN) is a South African security printing company responsible for the printing of the South African Rand. It is a wholly owned subsidiary of the South African Reserve Bank.

== History ==
The South African Bank Note Company was established in 1958 as a result of a decision by the South African Government to print South African currency locally. The South African Reserve Bank formed a joint venture with Bradbury Wilkinson and Company and commenced production from a factory in Pretoria. Bradbury Wilkinson and Company's shareholding was eventually taken over by the South African Reserve Bank.
