= SAMA Money Museum =

Currency museum in Riyadh, Saudi Arabia

- متحف العملات بالبنك المركزي السعودي
- Established: 1990s
- Location: Riyadh, Saudi Arabia
- Coordinates: 24°39′53.496″N 46°41′14.64″E
- Owner: Saudi Central Bank
- Website: www.sama.gov.sa/en-US/Currency/Museum/Pages/MuseumBrief.aspx

SAMA Money Museum (Arabic: متحف العملات بالبنك المركزي السعودي, lit. 'Currency Museum of the Saudi Central Bank'), simply shortened to the Currency Museum (Arabic: متحف العملات), is a currency museum in the al-Mutamarat neighborhood of Riyadh, Saudi Arabia, located in the compound of the head office of the Saudi Central Bank. Established in the 1990s, the museum is dedicated to exhibiting the country's history of currency use, including coins from medieval and pre-Islamic periods.

The museum has five halls:

Hall	Brief overview
First Hall	It showcases two Abbasid era silver dirhams from the Islamic Golden Age, one struck in 781 CE from al-Yamama during the reign of Caliph al-Mahdi and other one in 895 CE from Mecca during the reign of Caliph al-Mu'tamid.
Second Hall	The hall shows raw materials extracted from Mahd al-Dhahab gold mine that are used in multiple stages of printing banknotes and coin minting.
Third Hall	It's the principal hall for exhibiting various currencies from different periods of history.: 42 pieces of coins belonging to timeline from pre-Islamic times (i.e., before 610 CE) to 1980.; Banknotes and coins in circulation in the member states of the Gulf Cooperation Council.; Coins used in the Arabian Peninsula prior to the unification of Saudi Arabia.; Modern currencies in circulation around the world.
Fourth Hall	It exhibits different samples of historical banknotes and coins of Saudi riyals as well as special gold and silver coins issued by the Saudi Central Bank.
Fifth Hall	The hall portraits the security features of Saudi riyal banknotes as well as instructional means are disclosed for the identification of accurate banknotes.

== See also ==
- Money in Islam
