= Tumba Bruk =

Printing company manufacturing Swedish krona banknotes

Coordinates: 59°12′4″N 17°49′19″E

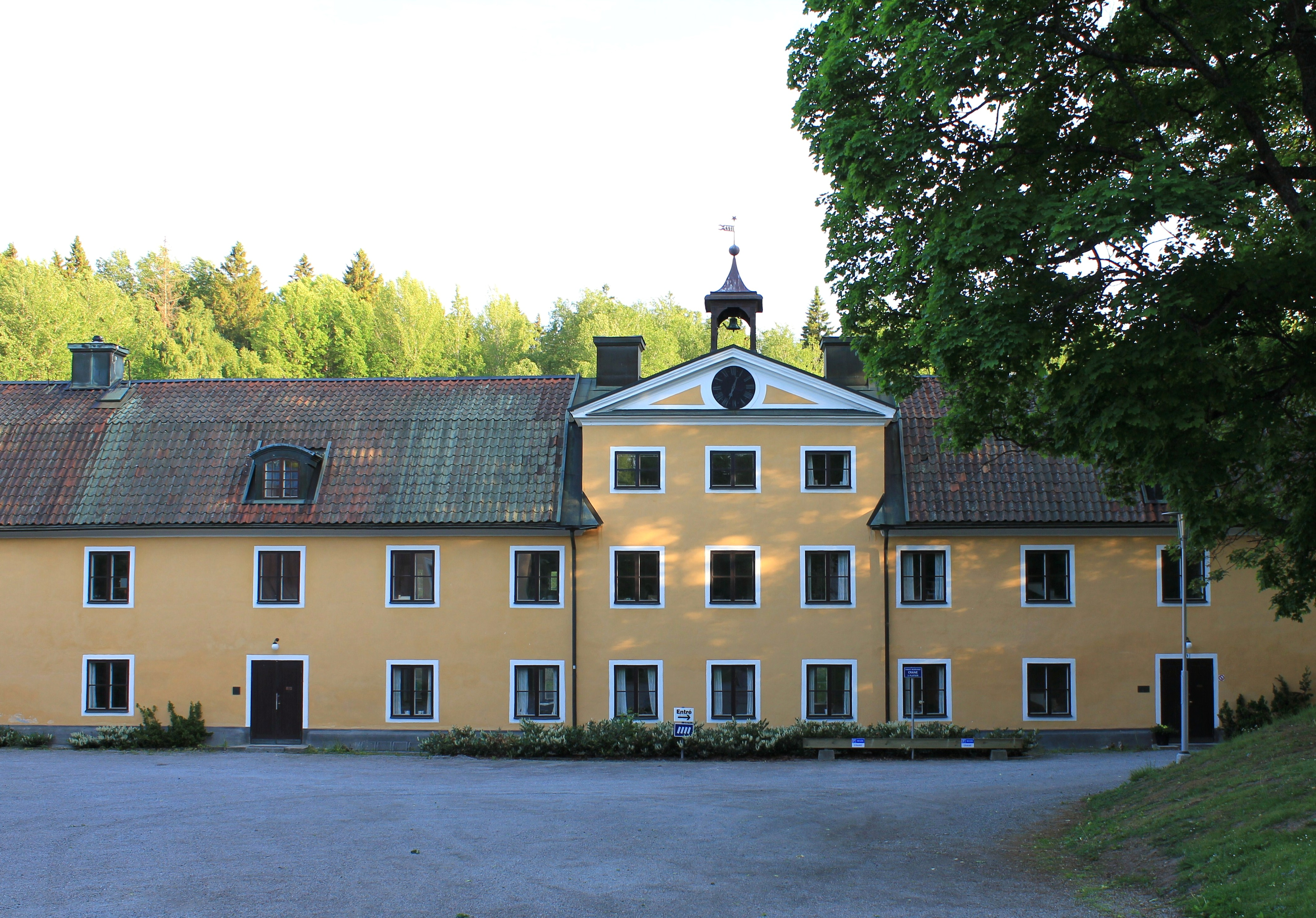
Tumba bruk, Klockhuset

Tumba Bruk was the printing company responsible for the manufacturing of the Swedish krona banknotes. The company was founded by Sveriges Riksbank in 1755 to produce banknotes, making it the world's oldest factory of its kind. In 2002, the company was sold to the current owner, banknote paper supplier Crane & Co. It is located in Tumba, close to Stockholm. The facility and its park were designated a listed building in 2001.

== Background ==
In 1661, Sweden's first banknotes were produced by Stockholm Banco, which were used as credit notes for its customers. These notes soon became worthless, however, when Stockholm Banco went bankrupt in 1668, and banknotes were subsequently prohibited.

Banknotes received a second chance in 1701 when the predecessor to Sveriges Riksbank started handing out transportsedlar, notes that worked in a similar way to modern cheques. These notes were easily forged since the paper used for the production of the notes was imported, and these transports were often hijacked. In order to combat this, King Adolf Frederick ordered the construction of a proper paper production facility on the grounds of present-day Tumba Bruk on 23 June 1755. Paper production on a smaller scale had been going on since 1750. To deter counterfeiting, printing methods were steadily upgraded. The Tumba paper mill was created so banknotes could be printed on specially made paper that forgers would struggle to reproduce. In 1755 the Bank purchased the Tumbo estate; the site included a waterfall to drive the mill.

Workforce recruitment began in 1756. The project depended on importing Dutch know-how in fine papermaking. A contract was first arranged with the papermaker Jan Mülder, but he was arrested in the Netherlands on charges of industrial espionage and died in custody. The offer then went to his brother Erasmus, a veteran of more than three decades at a leading Dutch mill and skilled in sizing and other techniques. Appointed master at Tumba, he trained the Swedish staff.
