= Printing Corporation of Pakistan =

State-owned company printing company of the Government of Pakistan

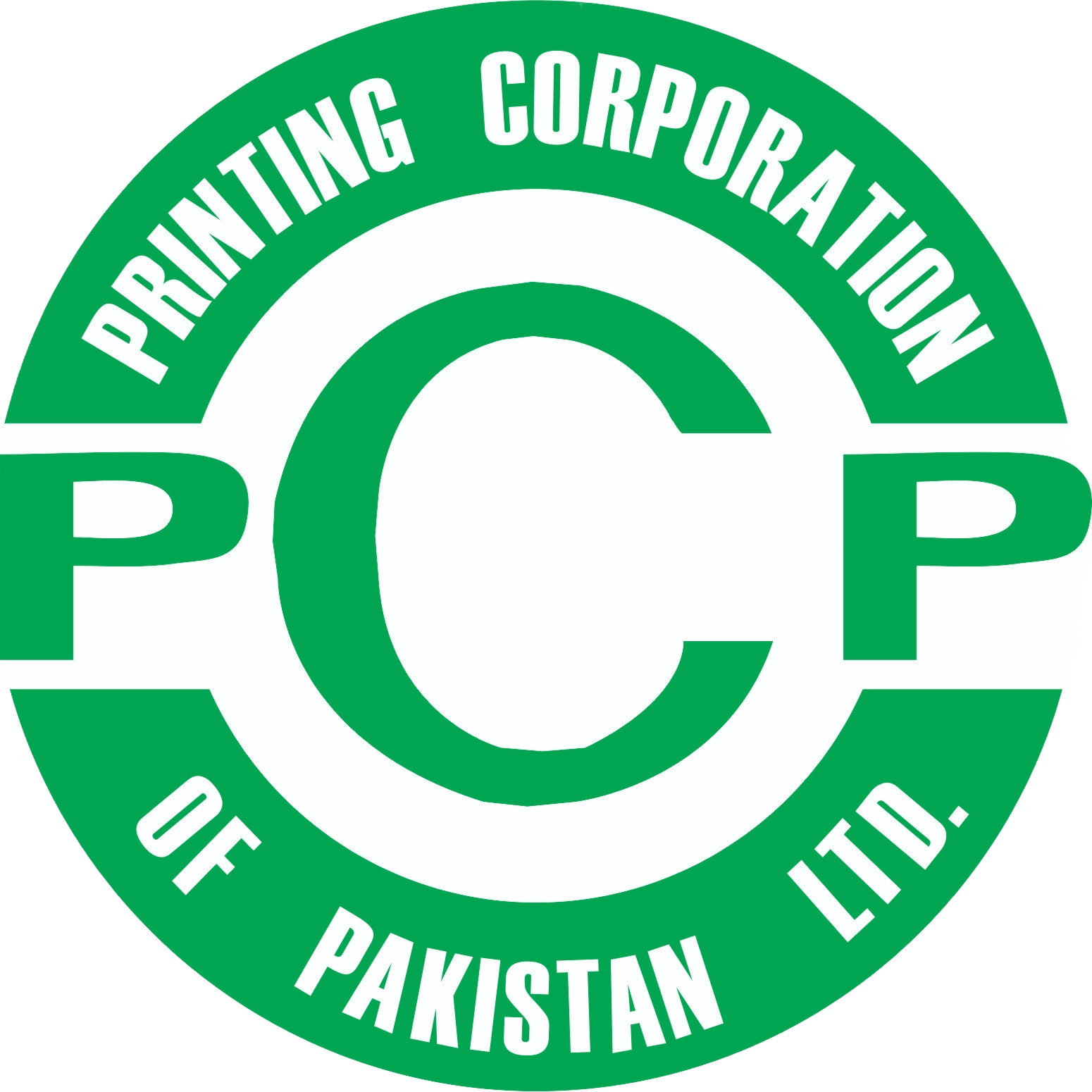

Agency overview
- Formed: 1 January 1969
- Jurisdiction: Government of Pakistan
- Headquarters: Islamabad, Pakistan
- Website: pcp.gov.pk

The Printing Corporation of Pakistan (PCP) is a Pakistani state-owned company that is responsible for printing official documents including gazettes, ballot papers and passports. It is based in Islamabad, Pakistan.

== History ==
The Printing Corporation of Pakistan (PCP), established on 1 January 1969, is a self-financed private limited company. It was formed by merging the four government printing presses of Islamabad, Lahore, Karachi and Dhaka. PCP provides limited printing services to federal government departments and generates its own funds. It currently operates three presses in Islamabad, Lahore and Karachi.

== Controversies ==
The corporation is mired in controversy. In January 2014, the Corporation refused to issue the Gazette of Pakistan notification regarding the executive committee of the Pakistan Medical and Dental Council.

Former Punjab Election Commissioner Mehboob Anwar stated that no printing press was ordered to print additional ballot papers after May 7, 2013.

In October 2023, another controversy arose when a shortage of lamination paper led to a crisis in passport printing.
