= Bangladesh Government Press =

Official printing house

- Formation: 1971
- Headquarters: Dhaka, Bangladesh
- Region served: Bangladesh
- Official language: Bengali
- Website: dpp.gov.bd/bgpress

Bangladesh Government Press (Bengali: বাংলাদেশ সরকারি মুদ্রণালয়) is the official printing house of Bangladesh government. It is also known as BG Press. The press is responsible for publishing government documents including classified documents. It publishes budgets, parliament bills, resolutions, ordinances, and posters. They are responsible for printing court verdicts and legal cases.

== History ==
Bangladesh Government Press traces its origins to the East Bengal Government Press which was based in Kolkata. It was briefly shifted to Dhaka Central Jail. It was reorganized and moved to current location in 1953 and renamed East Pakistan Government Press. After the Independence of Bangladesh, it became the Bangladesh Government Press.

In 2012, taka 11 crore were embezzled by people using fake cheques similar to the ones printed by BG press. In December 2014, bdnews24.com reported that security at the Printing press was inadequate. There had been some concerns over security after questions for national examinations, including Bangladesh Civil Service exams, were leaked. In June 2016, an employee of the press memorized questions papers for H.S.C. examinations and tried to sell them. He was arrested along with 9 others.

BG Press football team currently play in the Dhaka Second Division Football League, the fourth-tier football league in Bangladesh.

== See also ==
- The Security Printing Corporation (Bangladesh) Ltd.
