= Coins of the South African rand =

Coins of South Africa's currency

The coins of the South African rand are part of the physical form of South Africa's currency, the rand.

== 1961–1964 ==
1/2 c, 1 c and 5 c coins issued between 1961 and 1964

1 R and 2 R coin issued from 1961 to 1983

The rand was introduced in the then Union of South Africa on 14 February 1961, shortly before the establishment of the Republic on 31 May 1961. The rand replaced the pound with a decimal currency: 100 cents (100c) = 1 rand (R1), 1 rand being valued at 10 shillings and 1 cent at 1.2 pence. The coins bore the forward-facing portrait of Jan van Riebeeck on the obverse.

The initial circulation coins of the Republic were the following:

- 1/2 cent, replacing the 1/2d
- 1 cent, replacing the 1d
- 2 1/2 cents, replacing the threepence (formerly nicknamed tickey)
- 5 cents, replacing the sixpence
- 10 cents, replacing the shilling
- 20 cents, replacing the florin
- 50 cents, replacing the 5 shillings coin

The coins initially had the same size as the former South African coins. All except the 1/2 and 1 cent coins were in silver. The previous South African farthing coin (1/4d) and half-a-crown (2 1/2s) were not continued in decimal currency.

In addition, two bullion coins with denominations of 1 rand and 2 rand were issued, replacing the gold half-pound and pound coins introduced in 1952. Both the pound and the rand gold coins matched the specifications of the British half-sovereign and sovereign (minted, among others, at the Pretoria branch mint until 1932), including the gold alloy (crown gold) with a fineness of 22 carat (91.67%). The reverse of the gold rand coins features the well-known pronking springbok illustration designed by Coert Steynberg for the 5-shilling coin introduced in 1947.

Specifications of gold rand coins
Denomination	Diameter^{*} (mm)	Thickness^{*} (mm)	Mass (g)	Fine gold content	
Denomination	Diameter^{*} (mm)	Thickness^{*} (mm)	Mass (g)	(g)	(oz t)
1 R	19.43	1.09	3.9936	3.6608	0.1177
2 R	22.00	1.83	7.9873	7.3217	0.2354
^{*} Maximum dimensions

== 1965–1990 ==
South African coins issued between 1965 and 1988

A revised coinage series was introduced for 1965. Denominations included 1/2, 1, 2, 5, 10, 20 and 50 cents. Silver was replaced in coins by nickel.

Initially the coinage bore the portrait of Van Riebeeck, and later the State Presidents of South Africa (except F.W. de Klerk) or the South African coat of arms. The country name was given in Afrikaans, English or both. The 1/2 cent coin was discontinued in the 1970s in circulation, but struck in Proof only until 1983.

The gold rand coins were minted until 1983. Starting in 1967, however, they were gradually replaced by the Krugerrand coins, especially after the issue of the smaller Krugerrand denominations from 1/10 to 1/2 oz in 1980. The 1 rand coin was in silver and has the diameter of 32.7 mm and weighs 15 grams from 1967, but from 1970 to 1990, the 1 rand coins were smaller by 1.7 mm and it weighs 12 grams, and the composition was in nickel.

== 1989–2022 ==
South African circulating coins

New coinage was introduced beginning with a R2 denomination (initially known colloquially as a "De Klerk"), adding a R5 coin, and replacing all the denominations of the previous coinage. Initially the coins bore the coat of arms and the name of the country in English and Afrikaans from 1990 to 1995. After 1996, the coins carried the name in one of the country's 11 new official languages. The 10, 20 and 50 cent coins were slightly redesigned by enlarging the numerals of the coin's denomination. From 2000 coins carried South Africa's new coat of arms. From 2002, R1, R2 and R5 coins carried the country's name in two of the official languages.

Minting of 1c and 2c coins ceased at the end of March 2002. Minting of the 5c coin ceased on 1 April 2012, and the 10c coin, previously minted in bronze-plated steel, has since then been minted in copper-plated steel. The 5c coins are still legal tender, but have more or less disappeared from circulation, and most transactions are rounded to the nearest 10c.

5 rand coin introduced in 2004

A bi-metallic R5 coin with added security features, including a grooved edge and micro-lettering on the reverse, was introduced in 2004.

The gold Krugerrand coin is produced in 1/10 oz, 1/4 oz, 1/2 oz and 1 oz denominations.

The silver Krugerrand was first introduced in 2017 to commemorate 50 years of the Krugerrand. The 2017 silver Krugerrand has a commemorative inscription on the reverse.

Since 2018, the silver Krugerrand has been struck, but these do not have a commemorative inscription.

Commemorative 5 rand coins were circulated in 2008 for Nelson Mandela's 90th birthday, in 2011 to commemorate 90 Years of the South African Reserve Bank, and in 2015 for the 200th anniversary of the Griqua coinage, the first coinage issued in South Africa. These coins are the same in size and shape as the 5 rand that was introduced in 2004, but have different features. The Griqua Town coin has a bird and has the years 1815 and 2015 on the reverse, and the South African coat of arms and the acronym SARB on the obverse. Commemorative 2 rand and 5 rand coins were also circulated in 2019 to mark 25 years of democracy.

In 2017, a commemorative 5 Rand coin was struck to commemorate the Order of the Companions of O.R. Tambo.

In 2018, a commemorative 5 Rand coin was struck to commemorate Nelson Mandela's Birth Centenary.

In 2021, a commemorative 5 Rand coin was released to commemorate 100 Years of the South African Reserve Bank.

As of 2026, no standard issue circulation currency has been issued since 2019. The coins issued in 2019 were the 5 Rand, 50 cent and 10 cent pieces.

Specifications of current South African coins in circulation
Denomination	Diameter (mm)	Mass (g)	Metal
R5	26	9.5	Bi-metal
R2	23	5.5	Nickel-plated copper
R1	20	4	Nickel-plated copper
50c	22	5	Bronze-plated steel
20c	19	3.5	Bronze-plated steel
10c	16	2	Copper-plated steel

== From 2023 ==
From 1 January 2023, a new series, the Fourth Decimal Series, became legal tender. The designs were approved in August 2022.

== See also ==
- Coins of the South African pound
- Krugerrand
