= Transvaal gold fields =

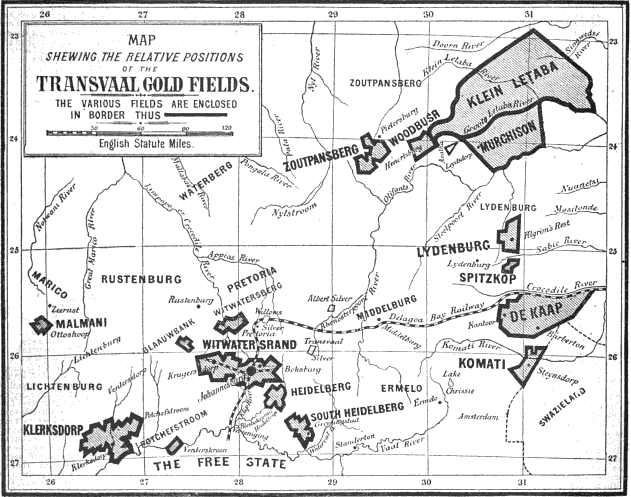
1896 map of the Transvaal Gold Fields

The Transvaal gold fields resulted from gold discoveries during the late 19th century in the South African Republic. After insignificant discoveries from 1840 up to 1870, payable or substantial gold deposits were found at:

- Leydsdorp in 1870 and 1883
- Geelhoutboom farm, or Mac-Mac diggings, in 1873
- Pilgrim's Rest in 1873
- Barberton in 1881
- Kaapsehoop in 1882
- Ferreirasdorp in 1886 (in the Witwatersrand Basin, Witwatersrand)

== See also ==
- Randlord
- Witwatersrand Gold Rush
