= Coins of the South African pound =

Obsolete currency

The coins of the South African pound were part of the physical form of South Africa's historical currency, the South African pound. Prior to the Union of 1910, various authorities issued their own pounds, some as independent entities. After the Union but before 1923, coins in circulation were mostly British, but the coins of Paul Kruger's South African Republic remained in circulation. In 1923, South Africa began to issue its own coins, adopting coins that were identical in size and value to those used in Great Britain: 12 pence (12d) = 1 shilling (1s), and 20s = 1 pound (£1). On 14 February 1961, the Union of South Africa adopted a decimal currency, replacing the pound with the Rand.

The term "Tickey" was used as a nickname for the 3d coin. It was also used for its replacement, the 2 1/2c coin.

== The introduction of the pound ==
The Cape of Good Hope was a Dutch colony administered by the Dutch East India Company between 1652 and 1795. In that year it was seized by British forces, returned to the Dutch under the Treaty of Amiens, seized again in 1806 and seceded to Britain under the Anglo-Dutch Treaty of 1814. After the 1806 seizure, the military administrator issued a proclamation prohibiting the export of coinage and fixing the relationship of the various coins in the colony. The relative values were:

Proclamation by his Excellency Major General Sir David Baird
	Skillings	Stuivers	Sterling
A Guinea	44	264	£1.2.0
1 Doubloon, 16 Spanish Dollars	160	960	4.0.0
A Johanna, 8 Spanish Dollars	80	480	2.0.0
A Venetian Sequin	19	114	0.9.6
A Ducat	19	114	0.9.6
Gold Mohur, 15 Rupees			1.17.6
A Pagoda	16	96	0.8.0
A Spanish Dollar	10	60	0.5.0
A Rupee	5	60	0.5.0
English Shilling	2	12	0.1.0
Copper Coin		2	0.0.2

During the succeeding years, British coins were introduced, but paper rijksdaalders which were nominally worth four English shillings continued to circulate until 1 January 1826 when British currency became the sole legal tender in the Cape Colony and paper rijksdaalders were redeemed at 1s 6 1/2d each.

== Coins of the South African Republic ==
The South African Republic (Zuid Afrikaansche Republiek), established under the Sand River Convention of 1852, was one of the two principal 19th century Boer republics. It was later to become the Transvaal, one of the four provinces of the Union of South Africa from 1910 to 1961, and a province of the Republic of South Africa from 1961 to 1994.

Although nominally an independent country, it was under British suzerainty apart from the period from 1877 to 1881 when it was under direct British rule. This has led to a debate as to whether its coinage should be classified as being a Commonwealth coinage, considering its constitutional status.

=== The Burgerspond of 1874 ===
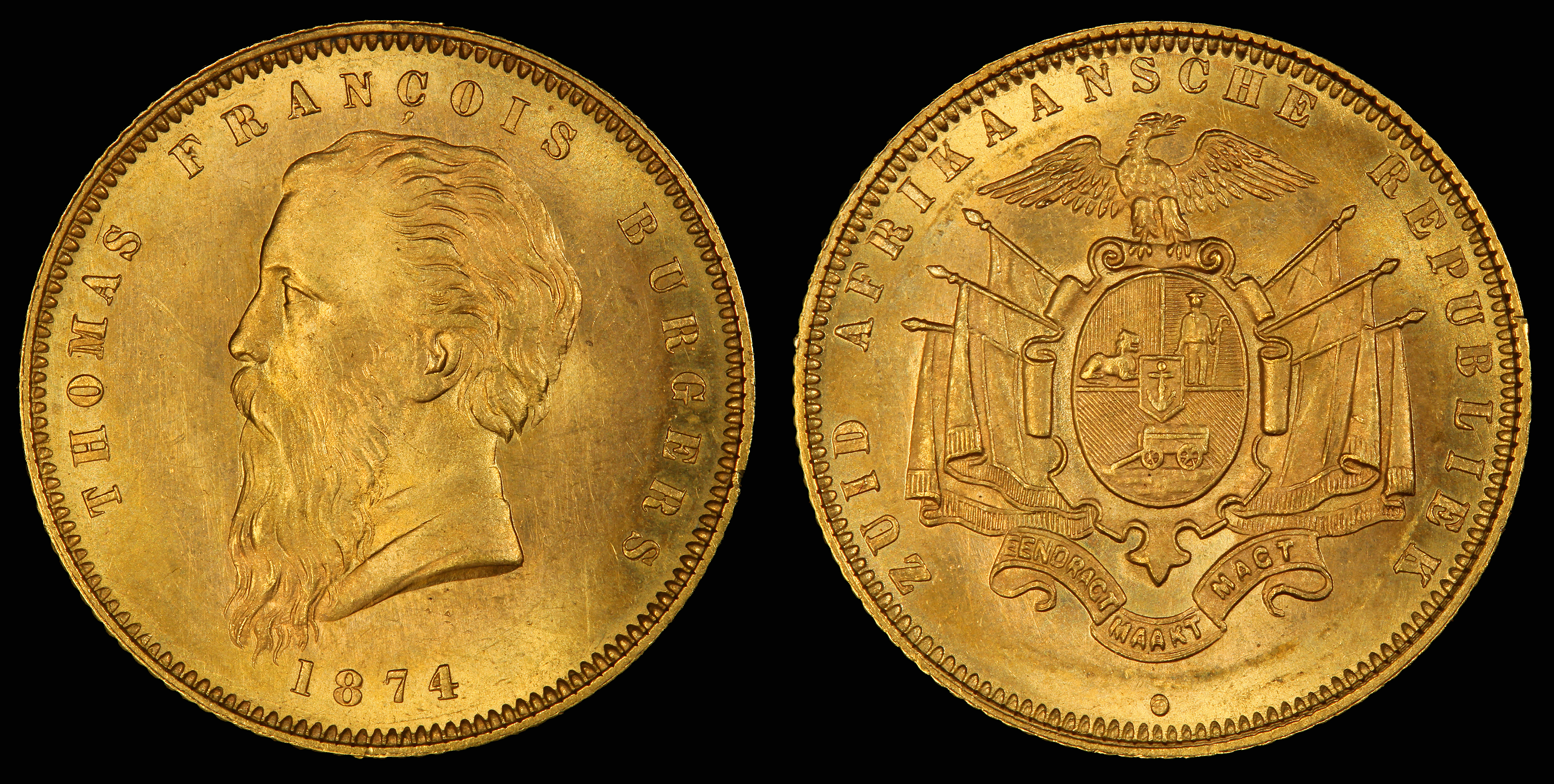
South African 1874 Burgerspond, fine beard variety

The Burgerspond, struck at Heaton's Mint, Birmingham, England, was the first coin to have been struck for any entity that later became part of South Africa.

In 1853, the Volksraad received its first petition for an indigenous coinage. It was not until 1874 that the President of the South African Republic, Thomas François Burgers responded to such a request. He sent 300 ounces of gold to J.J. Pratt, the Republic's Consul-General in London with a request that coins the size of the English sovereign be struck. Pratt contracted with Heatons to strike the coins as requested. Two batches of coins were struck – the first batch of 695 coins became known as the fine beard type and the second batch of 142 coins being known as the coarse beard type.

When the first issue (the fine beard variety) was presented to members of the Volksraad some scorned the coins that carried Burger's image. The symbolism represented foolish pride to a very religious community, but others supported Pratt for producing the first coinage for the Republic.

=== Kruger Coins of 1892–1900 ===
The discovery of gold in the Witwatersrand in 1885 turned the South African Republic from an impoverished state dominated by farmers to one where fortunes could be made from mining. In 1892 President Kruger, facing an election campaign, ordered the building of a mint and the striking of the republic's first full coinage series. The government, which contained a number of Hollanders and Germans, debated whether to base the Republic's coinage on the British coinage or whether to introduce a decimal coinage. Eventually it was decided to adopt the British coinage system as the basis of the Republic's system.

There were 12 pence in one shilling, and 20 shillings in one pond. These coins depict the portrait of the President Kruger. The name of the Republic was the Zuid-Afrikaansche Republiek, which was abbreviated as ZAR on the obverse of the 1d, the 2 1/2s, the 5s, the 1/2 pond, and the 1 pond.

The coins of the 1892 issue were struck at the Royal Prussian Mint in Berlin. The others were struck at the South African Republic's Mint in Pretoria.

There are two types of Kruger coins: Single Shaft and Double Shaft, which is derived from the wagon depicted in the Republic's coat of arms. The Double Shaft coins are known by the nickname Disselboom, which is Afrikaans for Double Shaft. The 1892 Single Shaft pond coin is a unique coin. The Disselboom coins are the 1892 1/2 pond and 5s coins. One has to be very careful, as there are forgeries of the Disselboom coins, especially the 5s. A genuine Disselboom 5s must have the wheels on the wagon the same size.

These coins were minted under the Presidency of Paul Kruger and bear his bust on the reverse and the coat of arms of the ZAR on the obverse.

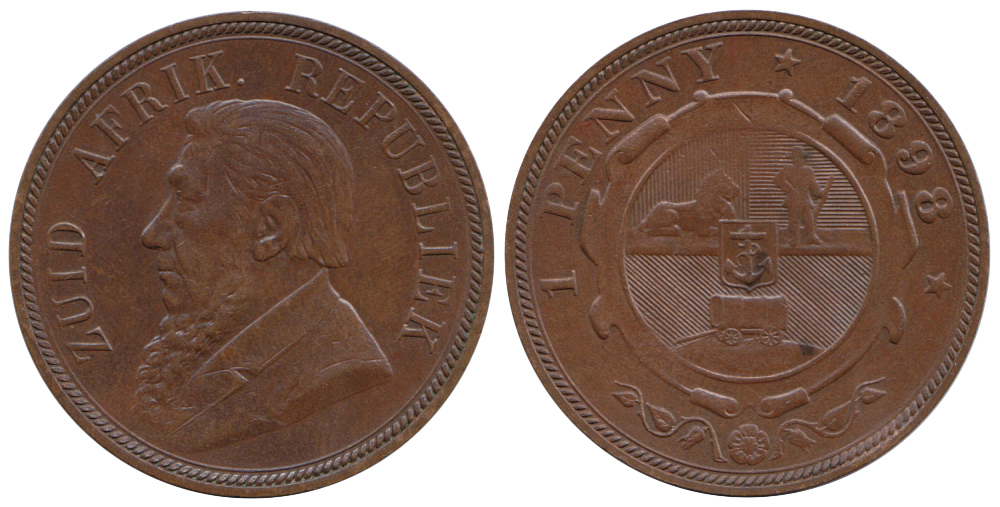
Penny 1898. Bronze, 9.43 g.

- Penny (1D/pence): minted from 1892 until 1894 and then only 1898
- Tickey (3D): minted from 1892 until 1897
- Six Pence (6D): minted from 1892 until 1897
- Shilling (1S): minted from 1892 until 1897
- Two Shillings (2S):minted from 1892 until 1897
- Half Crown (2.5S): minted from 1892 until 1897
- Crown (5S): minted solely in 1892 with both a single and a double shaft
- Half Pond (£1/2): minted from 1892 until 1897
- Pond (£1): minted from 1892 until 1902^{†}
- Blank Pond (£1): minted in 1900 with either a rim or without one
- Veldpond (£1): only minted in 1902

^{†} An 1899 pond was not minted because the dies, made in Germany, were intercepted and confiscated by the British. As an alternative, the Boer government used 1898 dies and punched a 9 on the obverse to signify 1899. Only one such coin was struck and came to be known as the "Single 9". The other 130 coins in the batch were stamped with two smaller 9s and came to be known as the "Double 99".

=== The Sammy Marks Tickey of 1898 ===
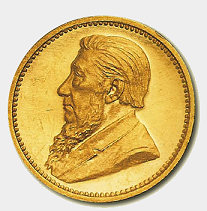
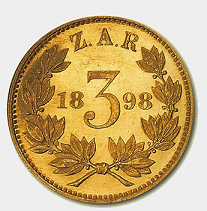
A Sammy Marks Tickey of 1898, depicting Kruger

This very rare coin is the same design as the Tickey of 1892–97, but dated 1898 and struck only in 22 carat (92%) gold. There are 215 pieces known. These were struck by the mining magnate Sammy Marks. There were also contemporary jewellers' copies struck at the same time. The jewellers' copies are also in 22 carat (92%) gold, but they can be identified by the lack of stops in the Z.A.R. monogram at the top of the reverse. The jewellers' copies of the Sammie Marks Tickey are popular with Commonwealth of Nations coin collectors.

=== The Veld Pond and the Kaal Pond ===
The Second Anglo-Boer War broke out in October 1899 and in June 1900 the British under Lord Roberts occupied Pretoria, the capital of the South African Republic. When Roberts' entry into Pretoria was imminent, the Boer Government left, taking with them any precious metals at the Pretoria Mint. Amongst the metals were a number of pond blanks that were ready for striking. These were put into circulation and became known as kaal ponde [naked pounds].

The Government set up an emergency mint at Pilgrim's Rest where a total of 986 Veld Ponde were struck and put into circulation. These coins, struck from hand-made dies, had the South African Republic monogram Z.A.R and the date (1902) on the obverse and the text EEN POND on the reverse.

=== Kruger pond brass token ===
There is a brass token that is often confused with the Kruger 1 pond coin. The giveaway is in the scroll below the coat of arms. Instead of the normal motto, it is inscribed 'IMITATION KRUGER SOVEREIGN'.

== Coins of the Union of South Africa ==
From 1923 coins of the Union of South Africa were struck at the Royal Mint, Pretoria. In 1941, the Government of South Africa took over the mint. It was renamed the South African Mint, although it continued to produce coins based on the British coinage for some years thereafter.

=== King George V first coinage (1923–25/30) ===
The 2/- was struck under both the first and second coinages of King George V.

- 1/4d. Reverse inscribed '1/4 Penny 1/4': 1923, 1924.
- 1/2d. Reverse inscribed '1/2 Penny 1/2': 1923–1926.
- 1d. Reverse inscribed '1 Penny 1': 1923, 1924.
- 3d. '3' in wreath: 1923–1925.
- 6d. '6' in wreath: 1923, 1924.
- 1/-. Reverse inscribed 'SHILLING': 1923, 1924.
- 2/-. florin: 1923–1930.
- 2/6. Reverse inscribed '2 1/2 SHILLING': 1923–1925.
- 1/2 sovereign, British type, but with 'SA' mintmark added: 1923SA, 1925SA, 1926SA.
- 1 sovereign, British type, but with 'SA' mintmark added: 1923SA, 1925SA, 1926SA, 1927SA, 1928SA, 1929SA, 1930SA, 1931SA, 1932SA.

=== King George V second coinage (1925–30) ===
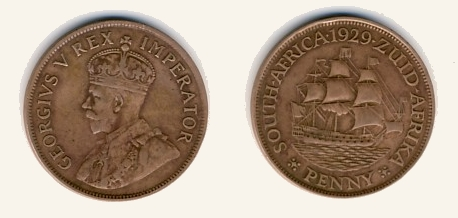
1929 Penny

The reverse of all coins for this era were designed by George Kruger Gray.

=== King George V third coinage (1931–36) ===
The previous designs by George Kruger Gray for the reverse of all coins was continued.

=== King George VI first coinage (1937–47) ===
The obverse features the uncrowned King George VI design by T. Humphrey Paget. The previous reverse designs by George Kruger Gray for all coins was continued.

=== King George VI second coinage (1948–50) ===
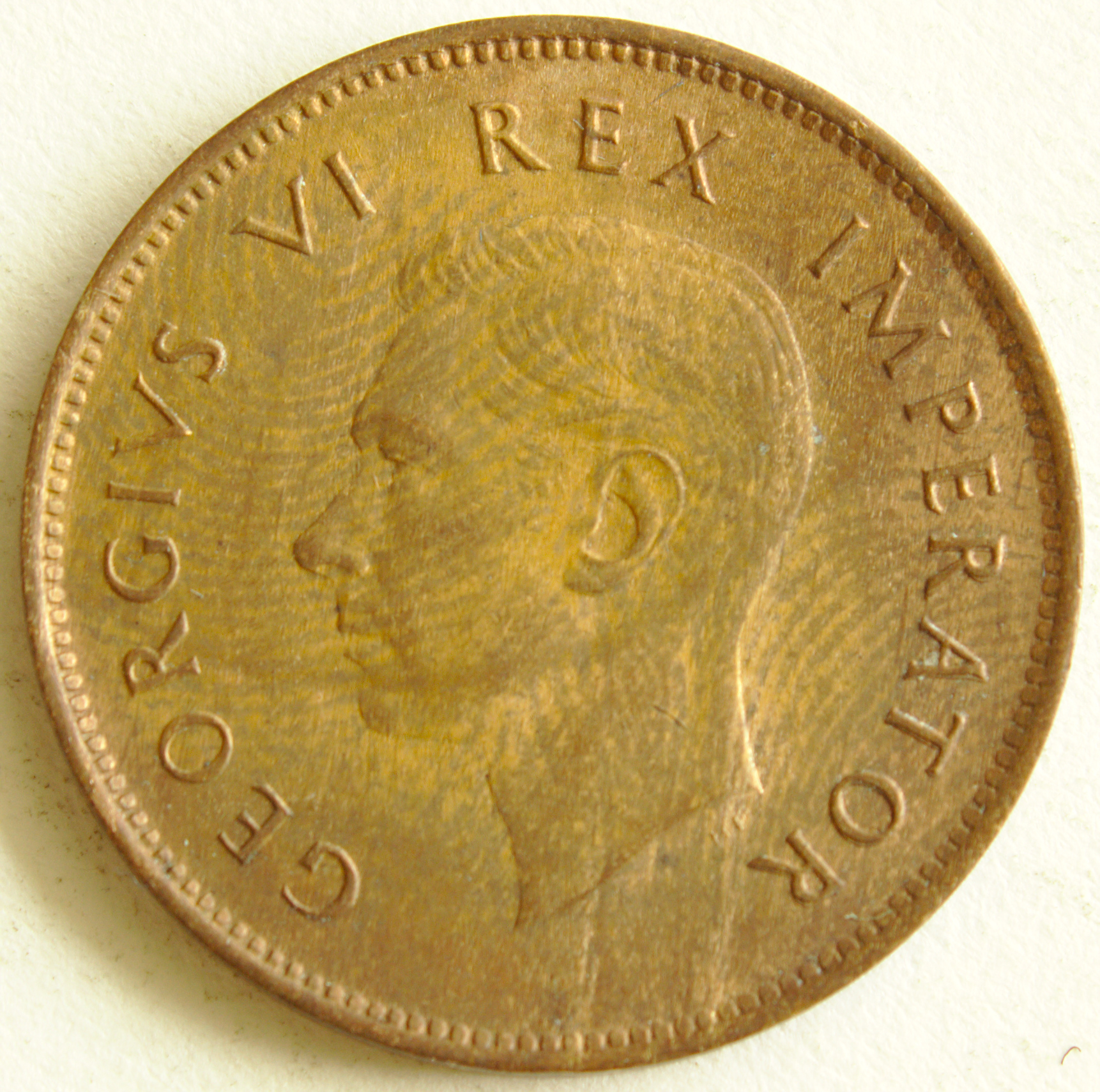
George VI depicted on a 1943 farthing of South Africa

The obverse continued the previous design by T. Humphrey Paget. The previous reverse designs by George Kruger Gray for all coins was continued except the 5-Shillings coin which features a prancing Springbok against a Karoo background designed by Coert Steynberg.

=== King George VI third coinage (1951–52) ===
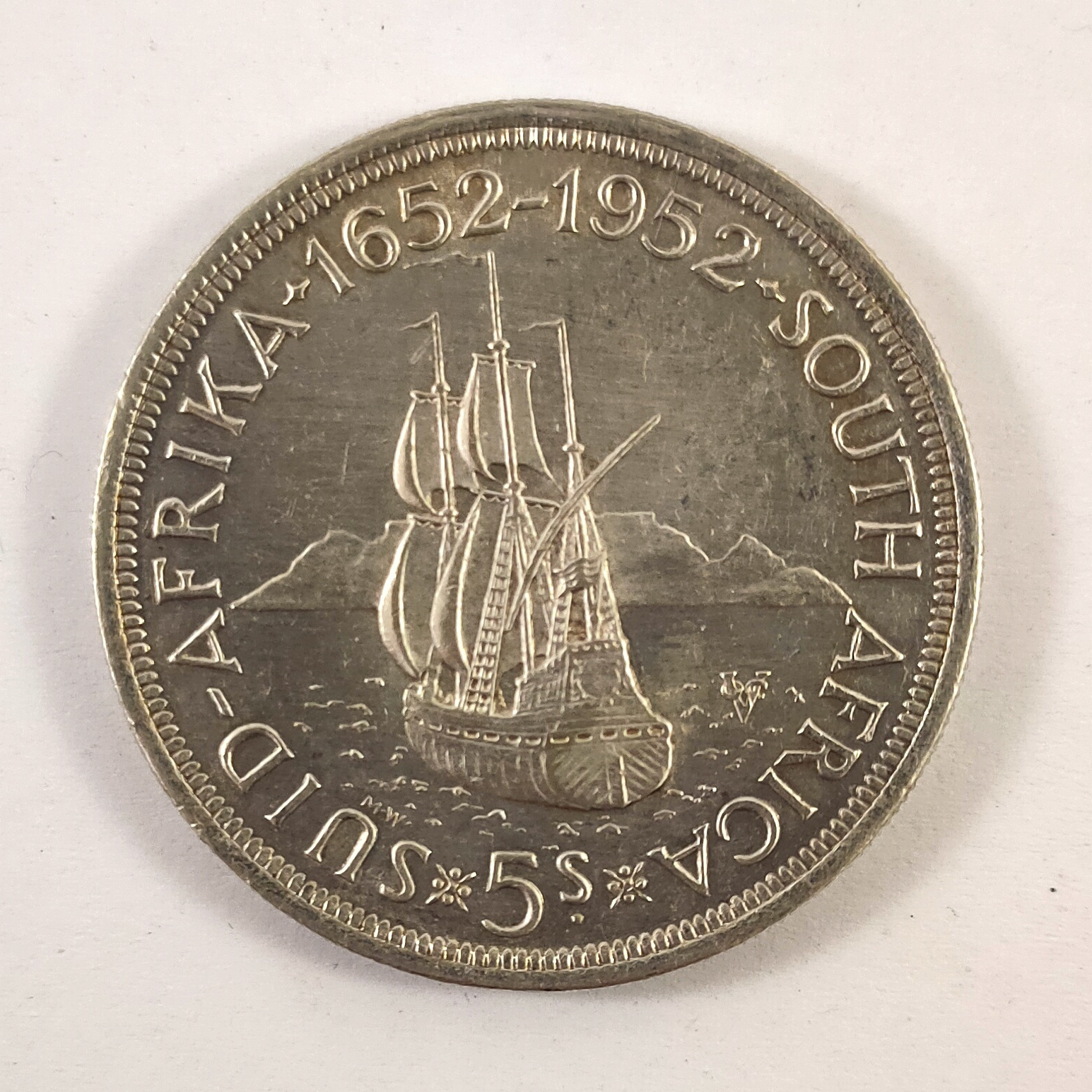
300th Anniversary of the founding of Cape Town, designed by Marion Walgate for the 1952 5-Shillings.

The obverse continued the previous design by T. Humphrey Paget and the reverse the previous designs by George Kruger Gray.

The 5-Shillings coin dated 1952 was a commemorative issue celebrating the 300th anniversary of the founding of Cape Town. The obverse continued the previous design by T. Humphrey Paget and the reverse a design by Marion Walgate.

=== Queen Elizabeth II coinage (1953–60) ===
The obverse features the portrait of Queen Elizabeth II designed by Mary Gillick, while the reverse continued the previous designs by George Kruger Gray except the 5-Shillings coin which was designed by Coert Steynberg.

The 5-Shillings coin dated 1960 however was a commemorative issue celebrating the 50th anniversary of the Union of South Africa. The obverse continued the previous design by T. Humphrey Paget and the reverse a design by Hilda Mason depicting the Union Buildings in Pretoria.

== See also ==
- Coins of the South African rand
