= Mac-Mac Falls =

Waterfall in Mpumalanga, South Africa

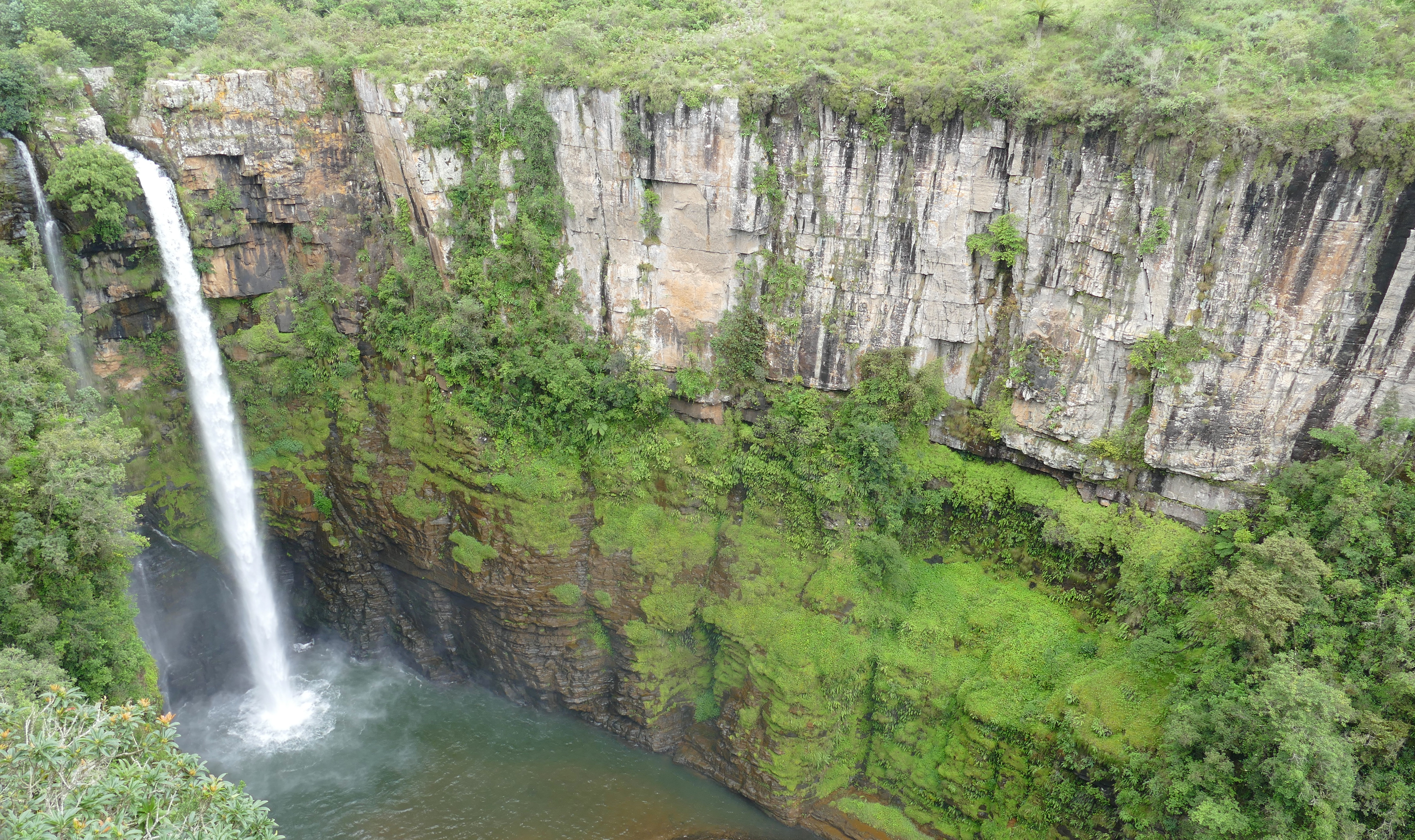
- Mac-Mac Falls
- Interactive map of Mac-Mac Falls
- Location: Mac-Mac Forest Nature Reserve, Mpumalanga, South Africa
- Coordinates: 25°00′02″S 30°48′58″E
- Total height: 65 metres (213 ft)
- Number of drops: 1
- Watercourse: Mac-Mac River

The Mac-Mac Falls is a 65-metre waterfall on the Mac-Mac River in the Mac-Mac Forest Nature Reserve, Mpumalanga, South Africa.

== History ==
Originally, the waterfall had a single stream, but miners used dynamite on the waterfall in the hopes of exposing the gold-rich reef, which now has the water falling in two streams.

It was declared a Provincial Heritage Site February 18, 1983, along with the indigenous forest in the kloof below the waterfall.

== Gallery ==
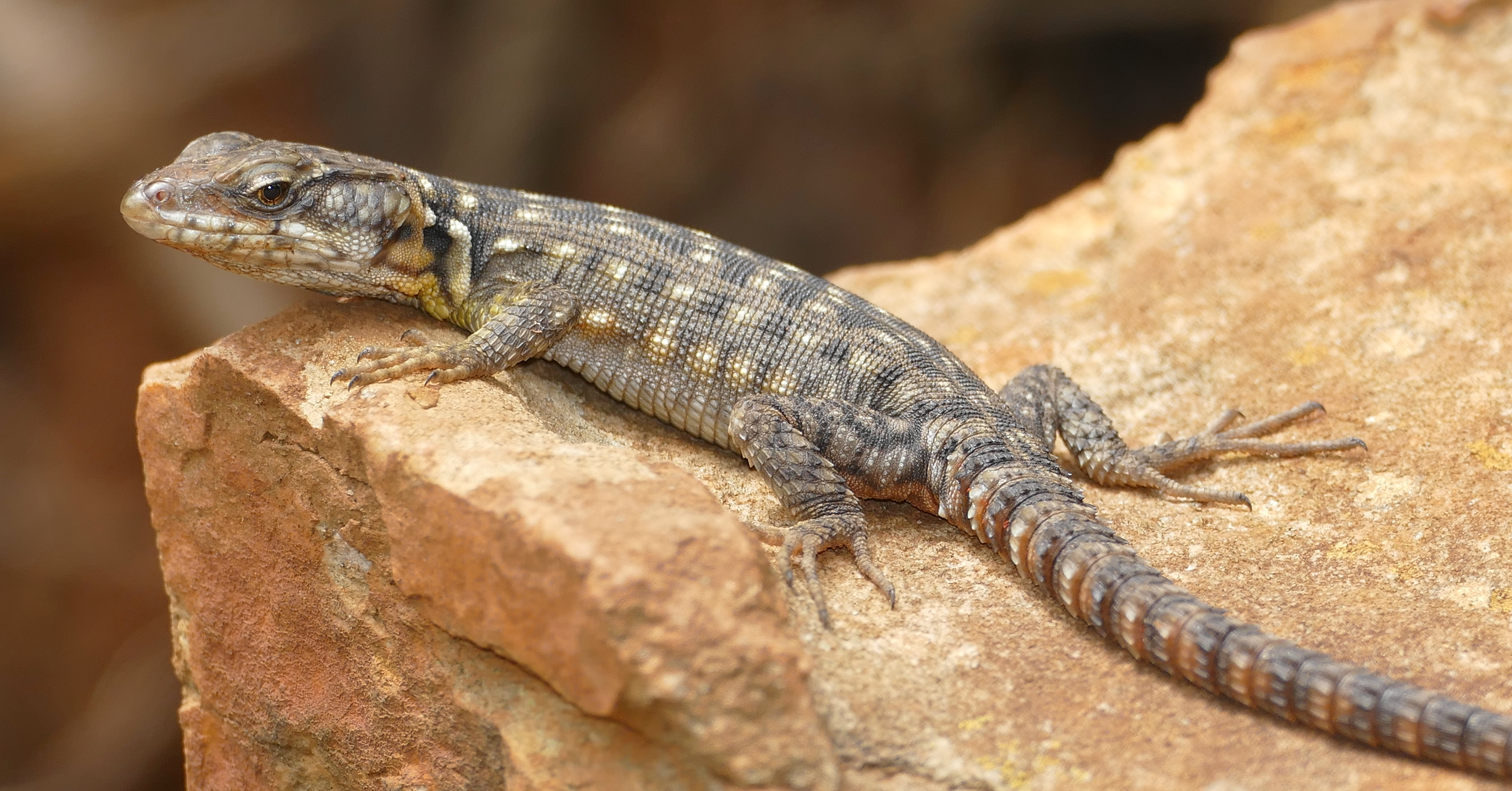
Northern Crag Lizard

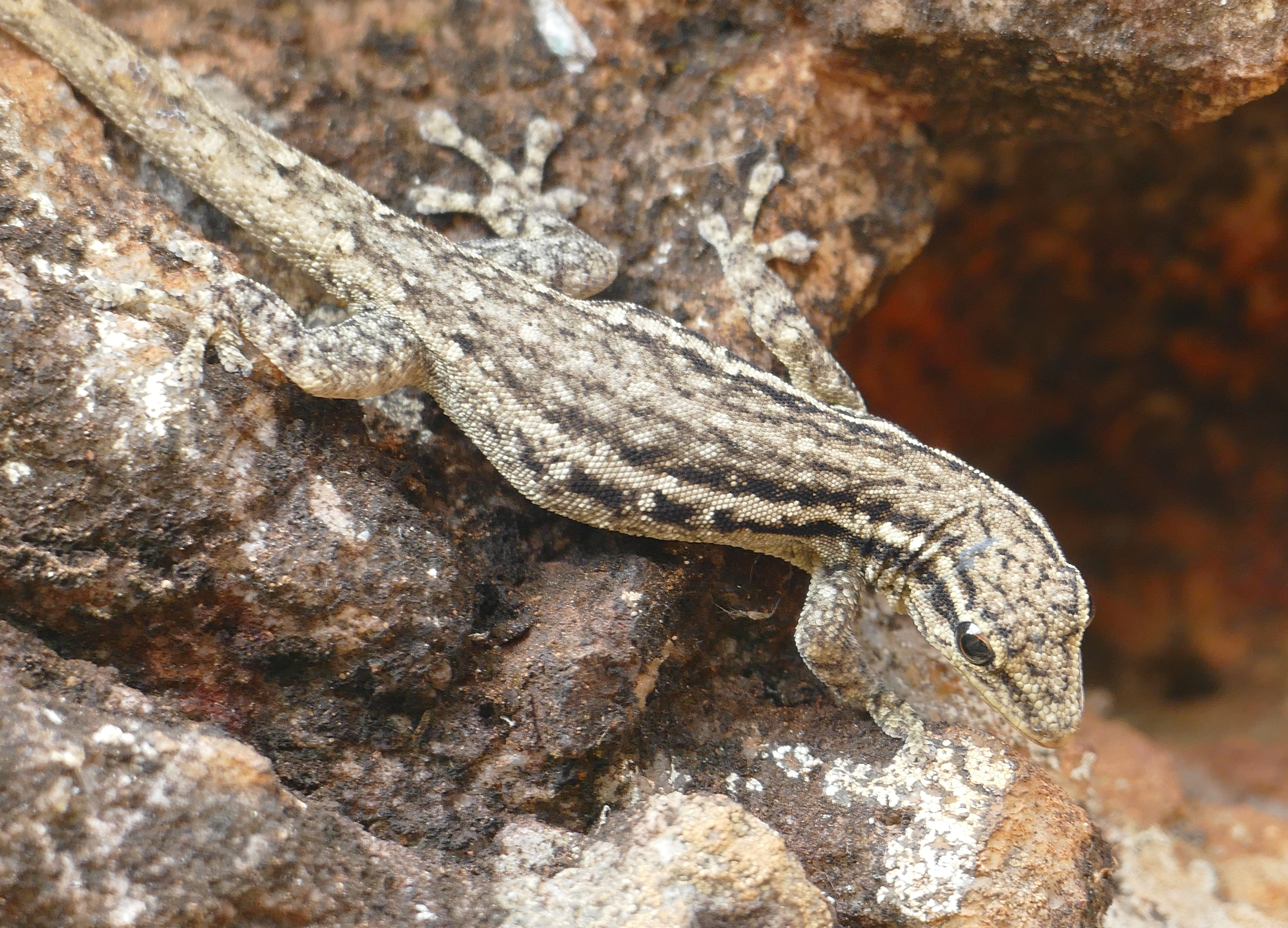
Cape dwarf gecko

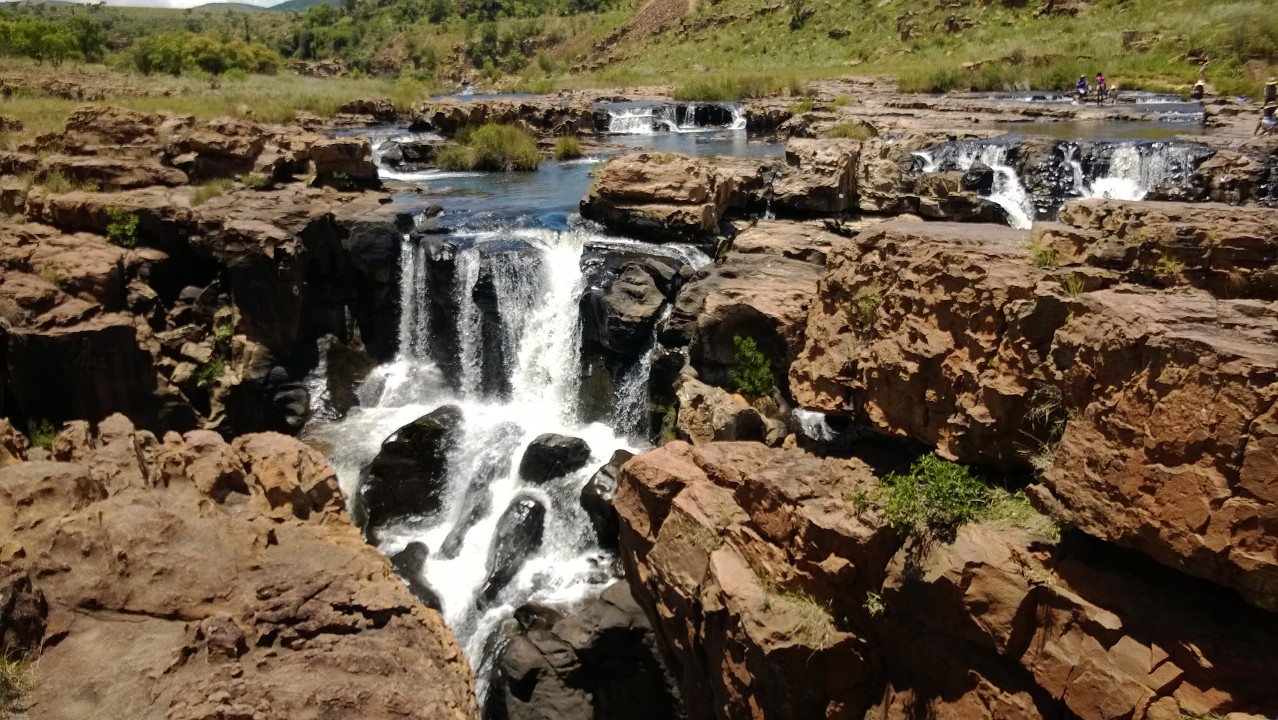
Mac-Mac Pools

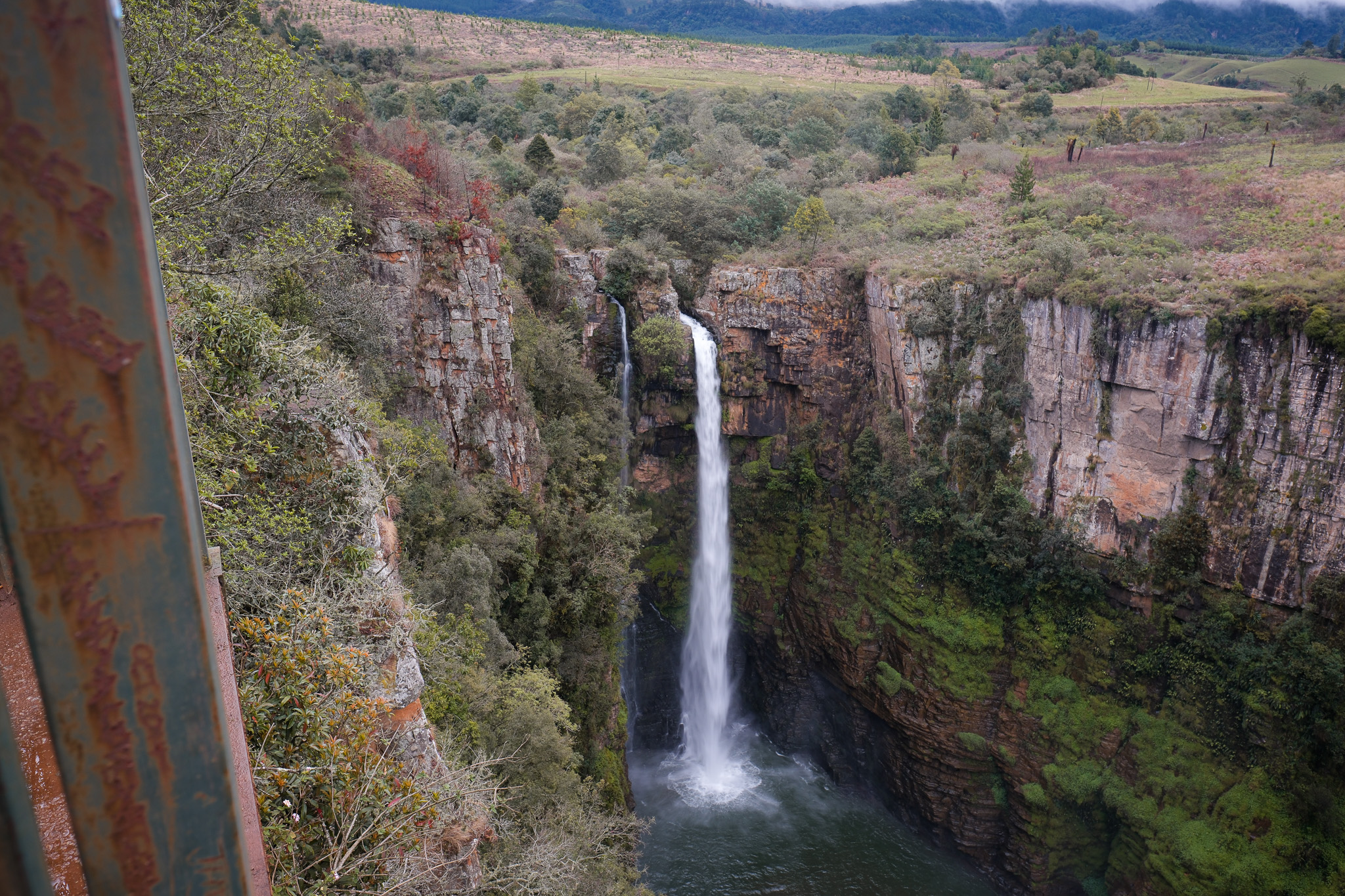
Mac Mac Falls

== See also ==
- List of waterfalls
- List of waterfalls of South Africa
- Mac-Mac
