= Pilgrim's Rest, South Africa =

Pilgrims Rest Pelgrimsrus
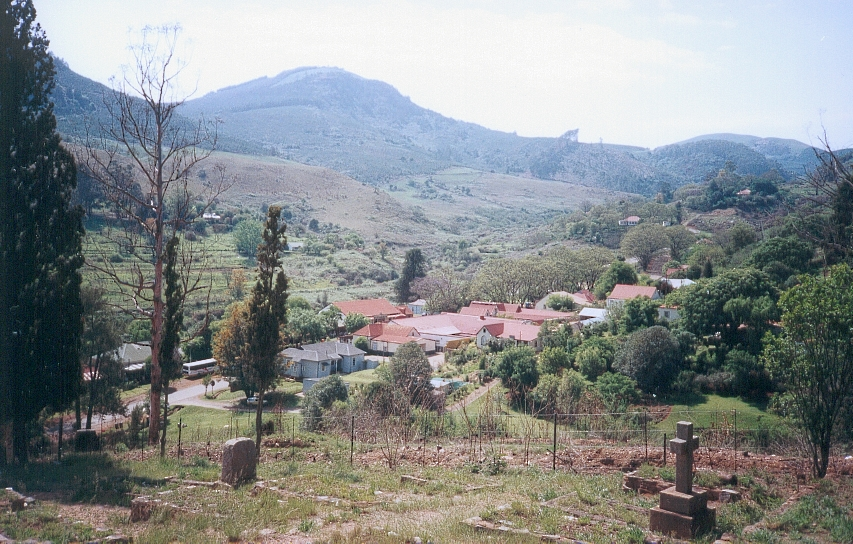
- (1998)

- Location within Mpumalanga Location within South Africa
- Coordinates: 24°54′28″S 30°45′24″E
- Country: South Africa
- Province: Mpumalanga
- District: Ehlanzeni
- Municipality: Thaba Chweu

Area
  - Total: 25.40 km^{2} (9.81 sq mi)

Population (2011)
  - Total: 1,721
  - Density: 67.76/km^{2} (175.5/sq mi)

Racial makeup (2011)
  - Black African: 93.4%
  - Coloured: 1.5%
  - White: 4.8%
  - Other: 0.3%

First languages (2011)
  - Northern Sotho: 50.4%
  - Sotho: 15.3%
  - Swazi: 13.5%
  - Tsonga: 5.9%
  - Other: 14.8%
- Time zone: UTC+2 (SAST)
- PO box: 1290
- Area code: 013

Pilgrim's Rest (Afrikaans: Pelgrimsrus) is a small museum town in the Mpumalanga province of South Africa which is protected as a provincial heritage site. It was the second of the Transvaal gold fields, attracting a rush of prospectors in 1873, soon after the MacMac diggings started some 5 kilometres (3.1 mi) away. Alluvial panning eventually gave way to deeper ore mining. In the 1970s the town, not greatly changed, became a tourist destination.

== History ==
The alluvial gold was discovered by prospector Alec Patterson. He panned Pilgrim's Creek, as it became known, when the nearby MacMac diggings became too crowded. He kept his find a secret, but a gold rush resulted when fellow prospector William Trafford registered his claim with the Gold Commissioner at MacMac. After it was officially declared a gold field in September 1873, the town suddenly grew to 1,500 inhabitants searching for alluvial gold.

=== Mining companies ===
In the 1880s the alluvial gold dwindled and prospectors were attracted to Barberton's newly discovered gold deposits. Towards the end of the 19th century claims were bought up and underground mining started by the company known as TGME. The better-funded mining companies started mining the deeper gold-bearing ore. By 1895 several small mining companies amalgamated to form the Transvaal Gold Mining Estates (T.G.M.E.). This company was listed on the London Stock Exchange and became the first listed gold mining company in South Africa.

As the volumes of gold ore increased, the engineers constructed small, local hydro-electric plants to generate electricity for the electric tramway and the ore crushers at the reduction works, built in 1897. In 1911 the 2,000 kW Belvedere power station (at 24°39′18″S 30°50′12″E) was completed on the Blyde River, some 30 km to the east. It supplied hydro-electric power to Pilgrim's Rest and adjacent communities up to 1992. Pilgrim's Rest was southern Africa's second town with street electricity, the first being Kimberley, also a mining town.

=== Boer war ===
Pilgrim's Rest was the location of an emergency mint during the Second Boer War. This mint struck the famous and extremely rare Veld Pond.

=== Graveyard ===
At the graveyard, every grave was laid facing in the same direction, except for the traditional Robber’s Grave which is laid at right angles to the rest, not facing the rising sun, and emblazoned simply with a cross and the large type words of "Robbers Grave". One legend attributes it to a robber who was shot when he was caught stealing a tent from another miner, while other legends would have it that he instead stole a wheelbarrow, or that the thief died after being lynched.

The most detailed account attributes the grave to a fortune hunter, one Walter Scott, who committed suicide. Scott would have shot his friend Roy Spencer, son of a well-to-do English banker, after they returned drunk from a party. Scott suspected Spencer of stealing his purse of gold. Scott pursued Spencer and shot him near the church, the site of the present graveyard, whereafter Spencer was secretly buried. The sobered-up Scott found his purse in his tent, and committed suicide when he realised what he had done. Scott was then buried in an unmarked grave next to that of his friend, Spencer.

== Recent times and tourism ==
Mining was closed down in 1971 and the village was sold to the government as a national museum. Transvaal Gold Mining Estates Limited started mining again in 1998. It is currently owned by Theta Gold Mines Limited, an Australian listed company. On May 15, 2004, the old TGME reduction works was added to the UNESCO World Heritage tentative List in the Cultural category but was removed in 2016.

The town's original architecture remains largely unchanged since the heyday of the mining era, because the town was declared a National Monument. It became a provincial heritage site in 1986. The village is a cultural heritage site and living museum with a variety of village museums, tours, accommodation, restaurants and shops.

== Gallery ==
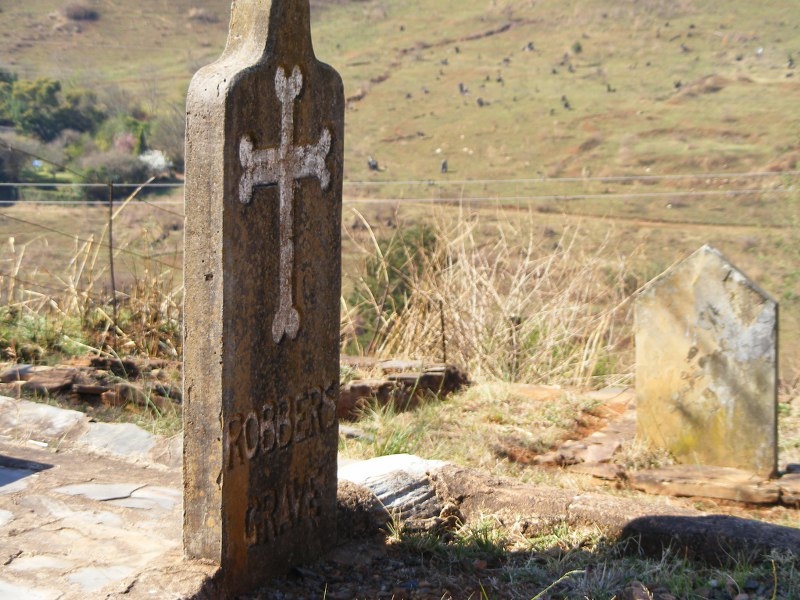
The Robber's Grave

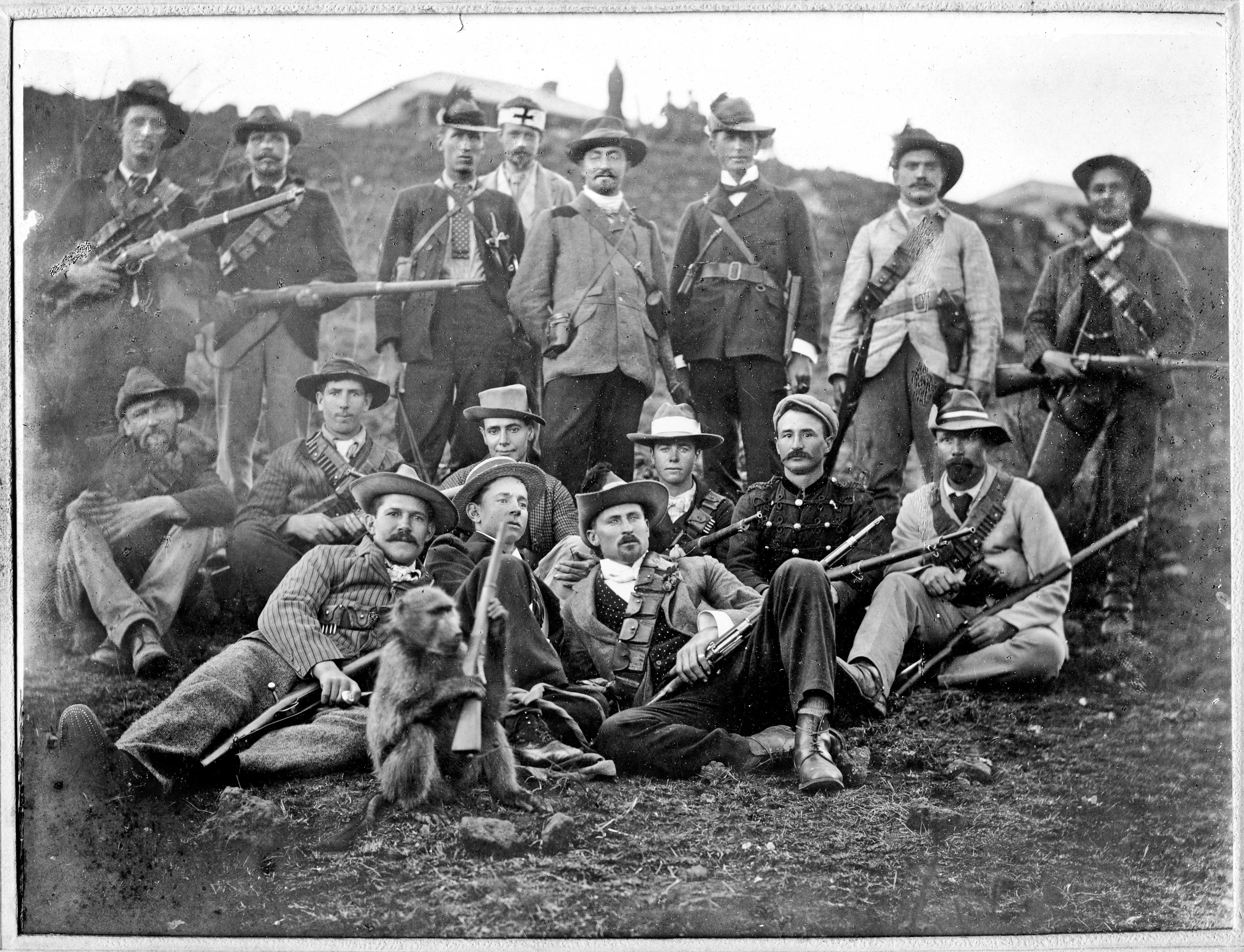
General Ben Viljoen and his Commando, Pelgrimsrus district (Pilgrim's Rest, South Africa). A baboon with a rifle, 1901.

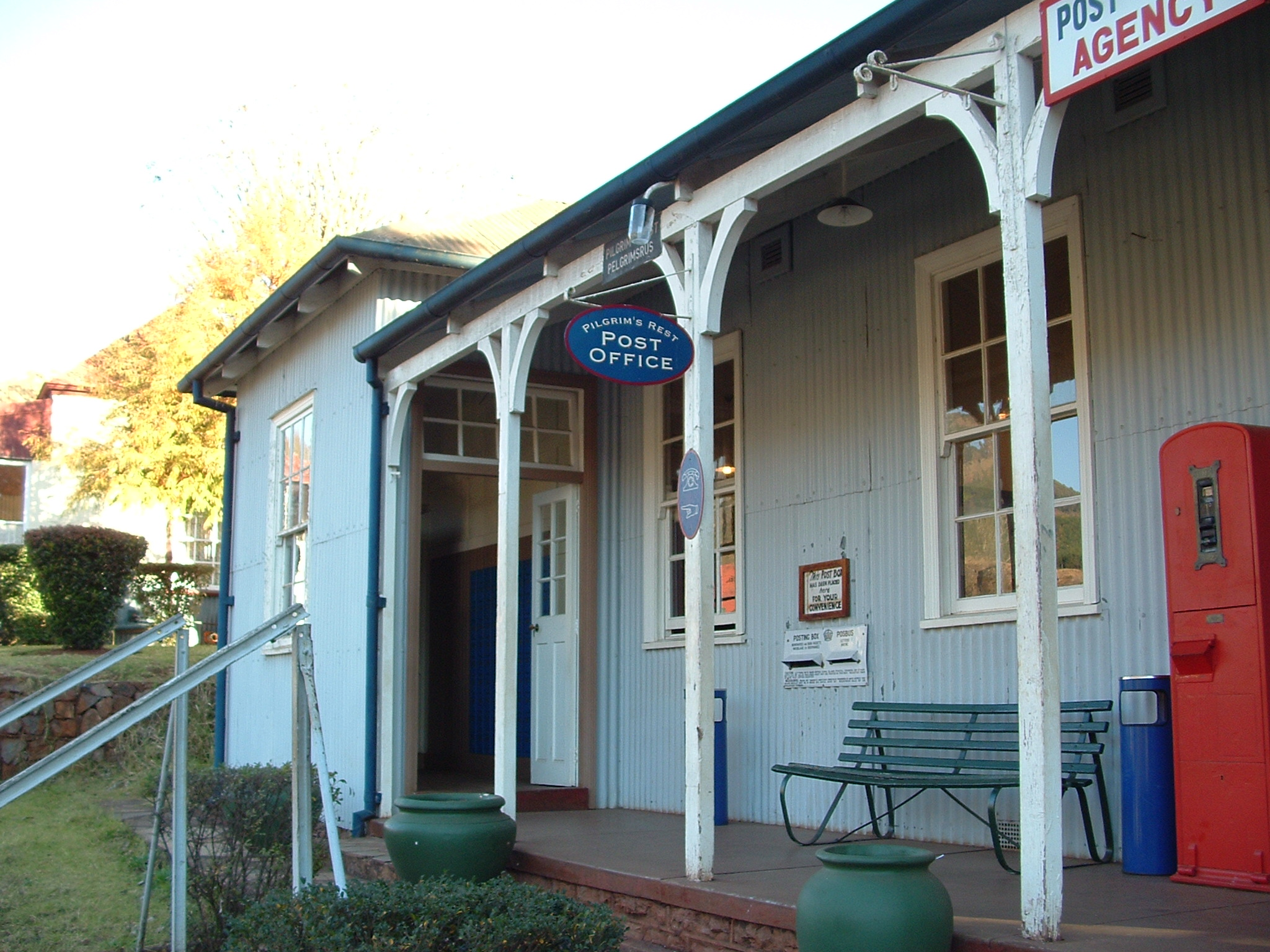
Post Office

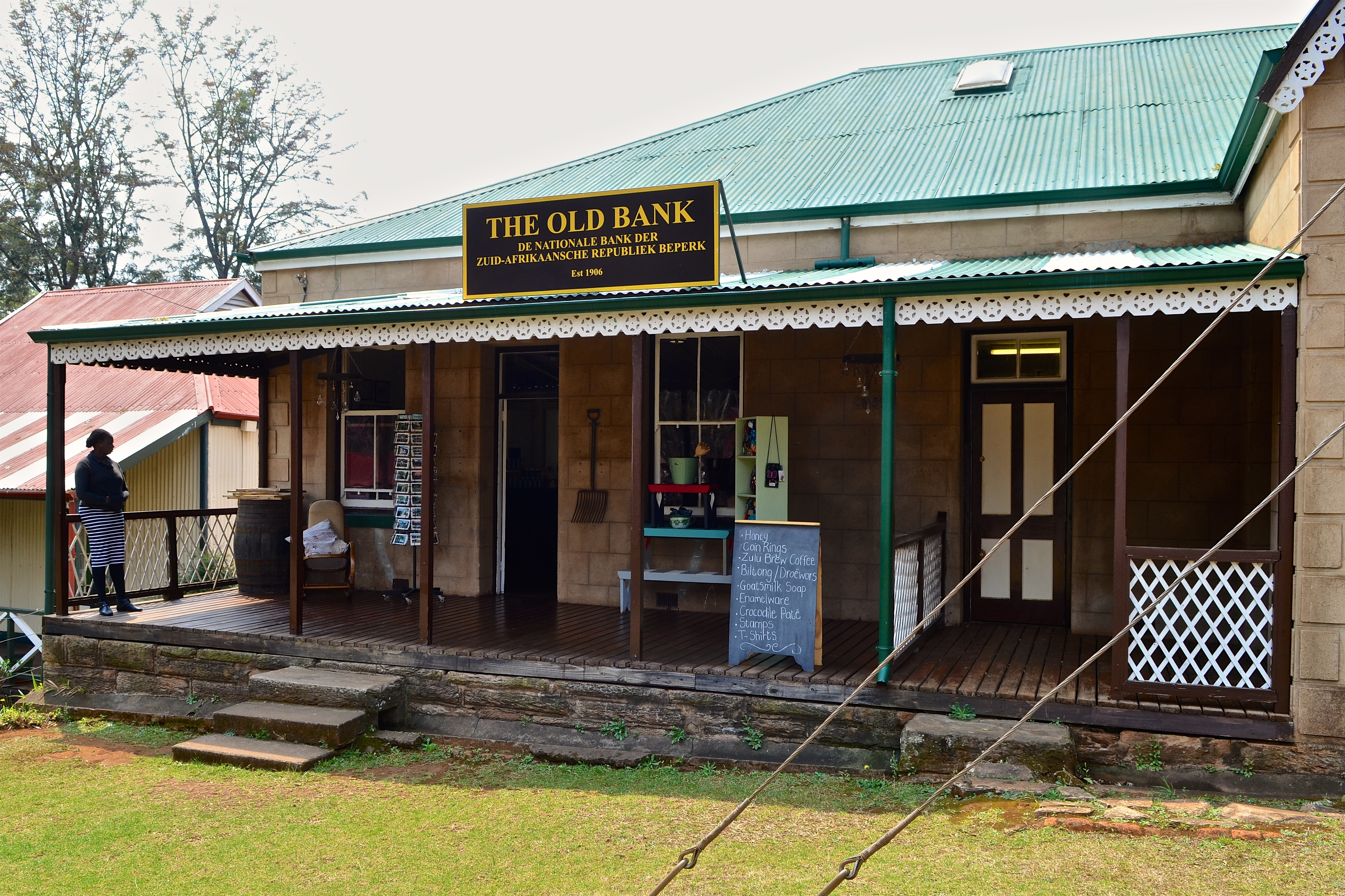
The Old Bank

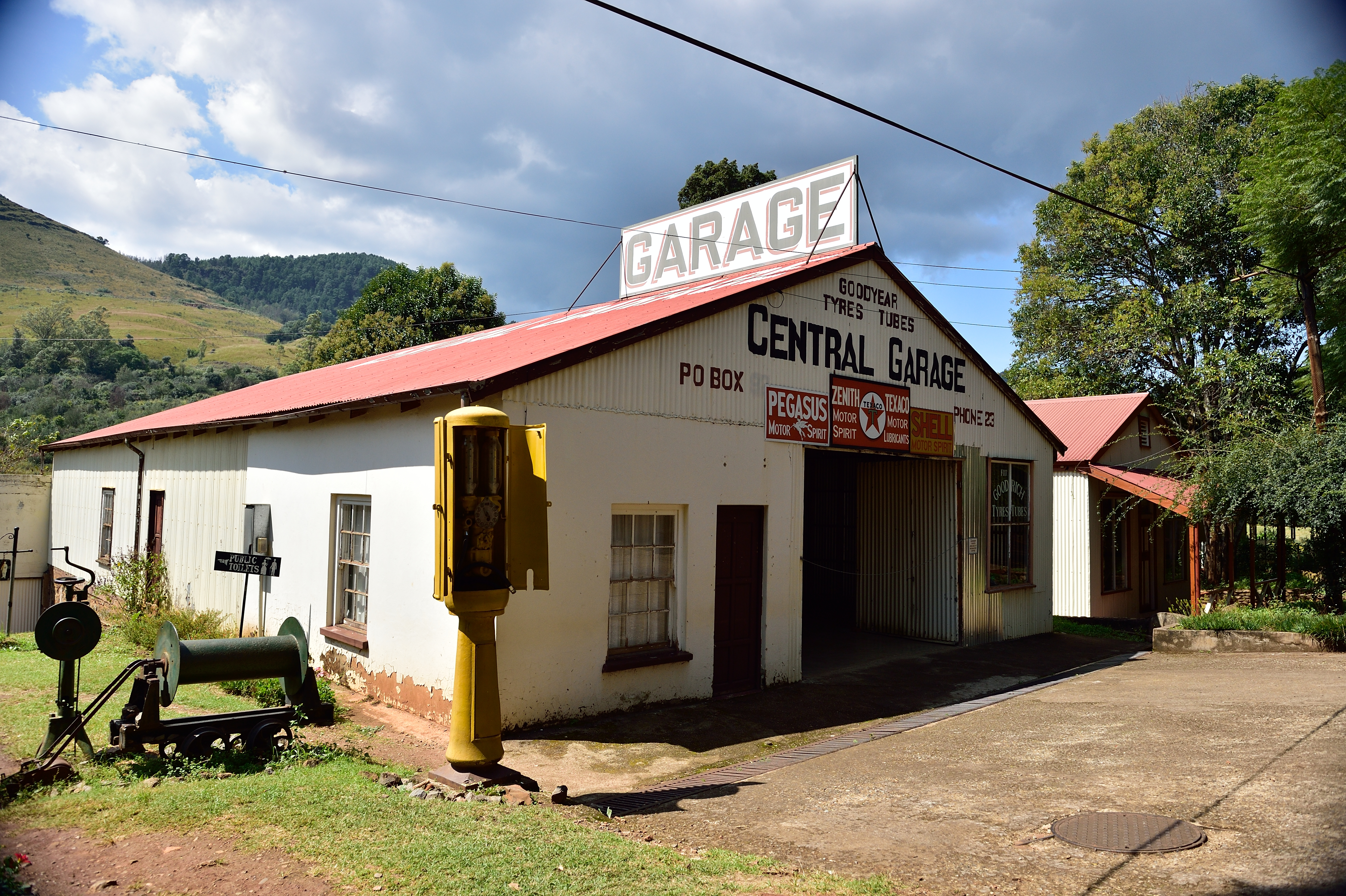
Central Garage

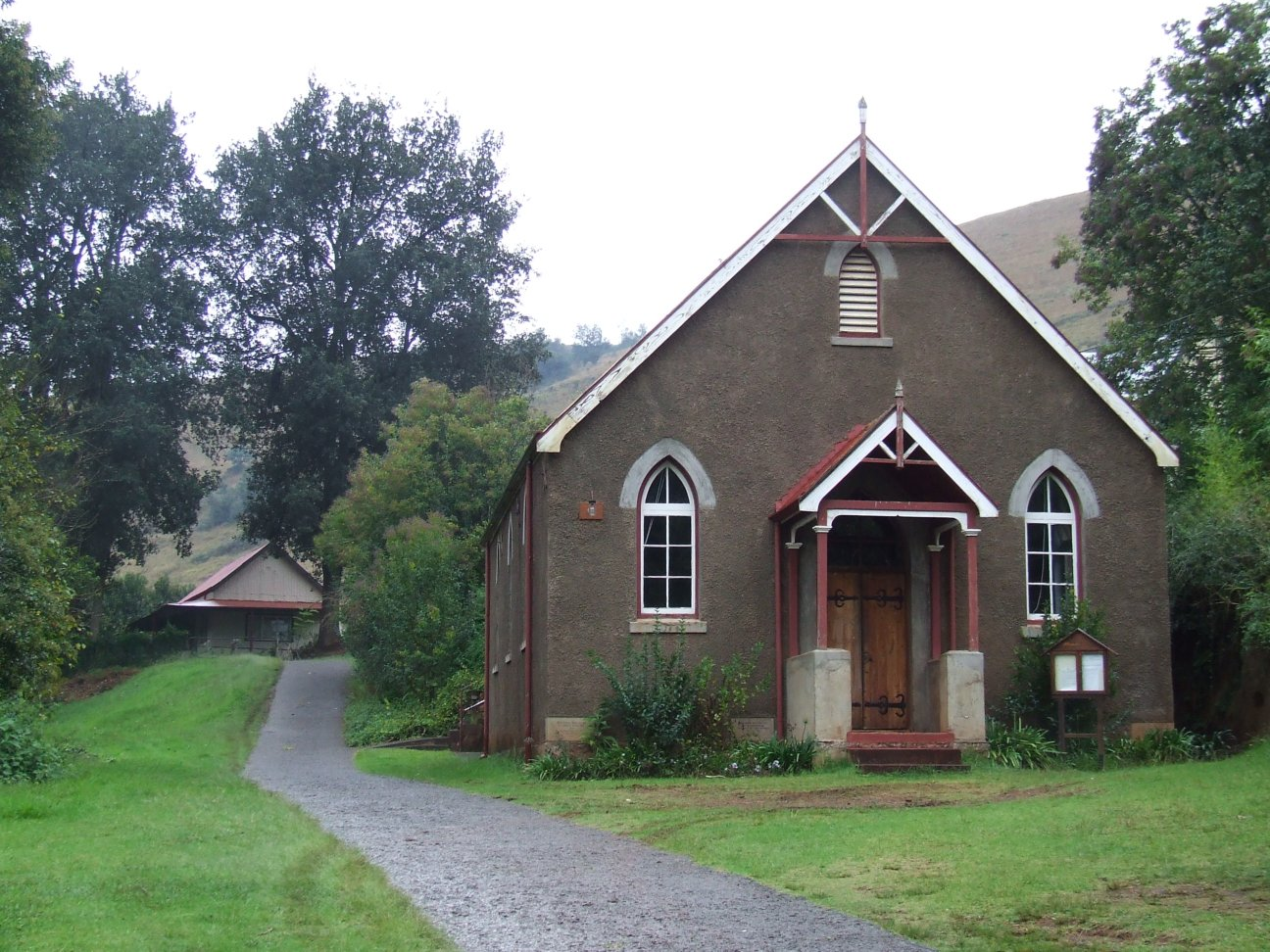
Methodist Church

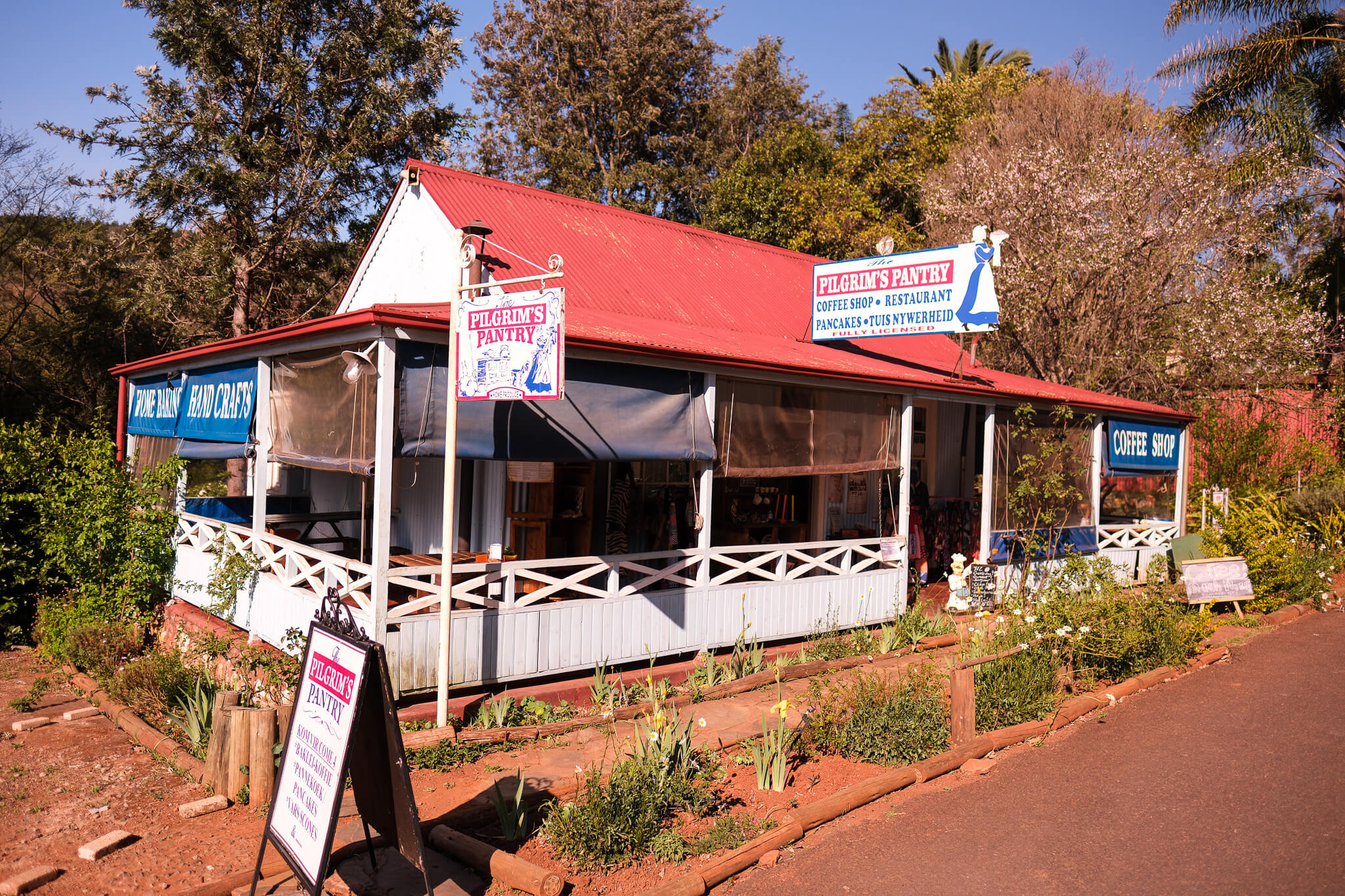
Shop in Pilgrim's Rest

== In popular culture ==
- Pilgrim's Rest was featured in the "Kingdom of the Vanished" episode of the Science Channel's TV program Mysteries of the Abandoned, originally cablecast on October 24, 2019.

== See also ==
- Coins of the South African pound
- Jock of the Bushveld
