= Rand Refinery =

Precious metals refinery in South Africa

Coordinates: 26°13′08″S 28°09′18″E

- Industry: Metals & Mining
- Founded: 1920 in Germiston, South Africa
- Headquarters: Germiston, Gauteng, South Africa
- Key people: Praveen Baijnath (CEO)
- Products: Krugerrands
- Services: Precious metals refining and smelting
- Website: www.randrefinery.com

Rand Refinery (Pty) Limited is the world's largest integrated single-site precious metals refining and smelting complex. It was established in 1920 to refine gold within South Africa, which had previously been refined in London.

== History ==
It was established in 1920 in Germiston, South Africa, by the Chamber of Mines of South Africa to refine all the gold produced by South Africa's gold mines instead of in London. As of 1919, the Bank of England would receive consignments of raw gold from the producers and issue it to individual refineries, refined and then returned to the Bank for sale, and the hope was that after the Rand Refinery was built, the gold industry would still be financed in London and that the refined gold would be sold in the latter. On 27 November 1920, Rand Refinery Ltd was registered as a private company, the capital raised from shares of gold mining companies that were members of the Chamber of Mines. The building of the facilities commenced in August 1920. Low-quality ingots would be received from the gold mines and then refined to 99.6% purity and then sold to the South African Reserve Bank for sale around the world on the London and Zurich bullion markets. By 1922, the supply of gold to London was almost nonexistent and impacted the two major UK refiners, Johnson Matthey and Rothschild. Rand Refinery is one of five companies accredited as Good Delivery Referees by London Bullion Market Association (LBMA).

== Products ==
In recent years, Rand Refinery has evolved from a pure refiner of doré to a more rounded company emphasizing beneficiation. It facilitates a wide range of value-added products, including:

- cast bars
- minted bars
- minted coins
- coin blanks and medallions
- semi-fabricated products for the jewellery manufacturing industry

By law, the South African Mint Company is the only company allowed to manufacture South African legal tender coins such as the world-famous Krugerrand. Rand Refinery supplies all the gold used to manufacture the coins. It has been appointed the sole supplier of bullion Krugerrands to primary distributors both locally and internationally.

In addition to its smelting and refining services, Rand Refinery offers metallurgical, logistics, and vault services. It acts as an agent for its precious metal depositing customers, and its global market business unit markets all the precious metal produced by the refinery.
