= Christmas Kettle =

Fundraising campaign by The Salvation Army

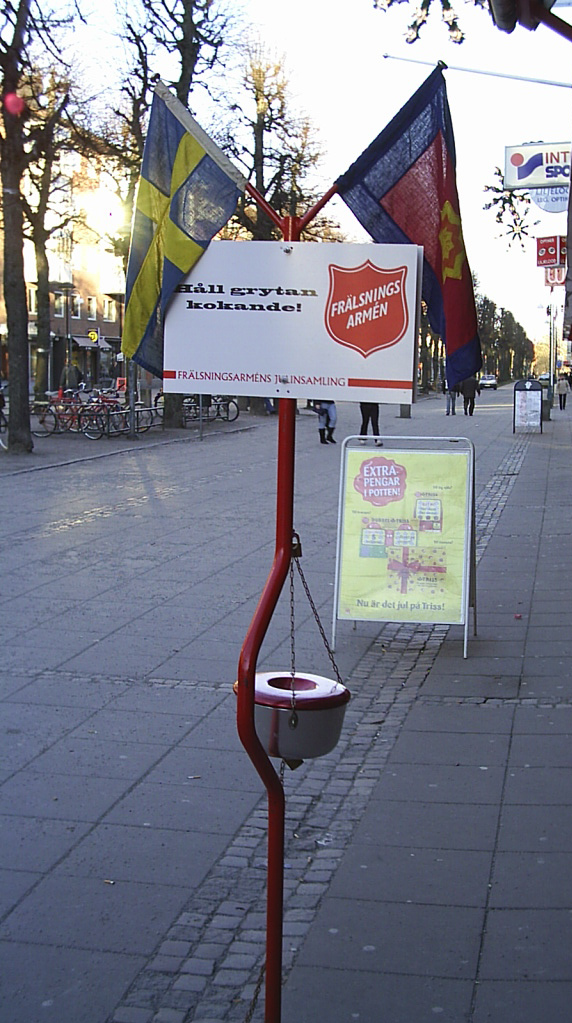
A Christmas kettle in Sweden

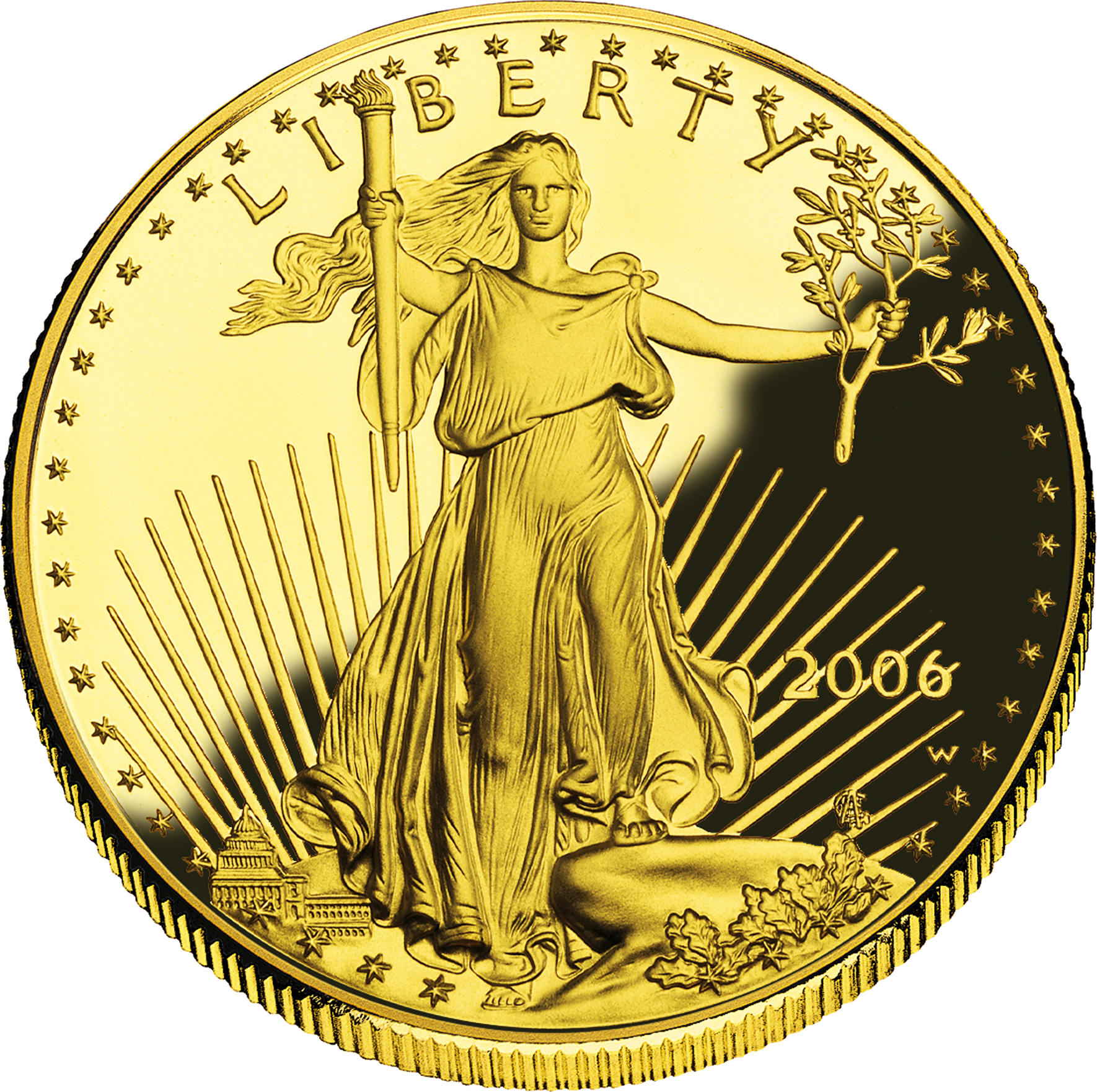
An American Gold Eagle

The Christmas Kettle (also referred to as the Red Kettle due to its color) is The Salvation Army's most famous street campaign. It is most recognized during the Christmas season through its volunteers who stand outside of businesses and play or sing Christmas carols, or ring bells to inspire passersby to place donations of cash and checks inside the trademark red kettles.

== History ==
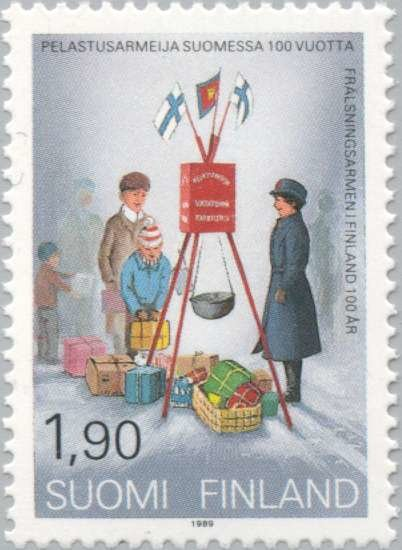
Stamp of Finland Christmas collecting by the Salvation Army

A tradition on the "kettle" started in 1891, in San Francisco, by Salvation Army officer Captain Joseph McFee. Captain McFee, resolving to provide a free Christmas dinner to the poor of San Francisco, remembered a sight he saw in Liverpool, England. From his days as a sailor McFee remembered a large pot displayed on the Stage Landing, called "Simpson's Pot." The pot took in donations put in by passersby. Taking this idea, McFee asked for permission from San Francisco city authorities to place a crab pot and tripod at the Oakland ferry landing. The kettle -- and McFee's call of "Keep the Pot Boiling!" -- drew in passengers and donations.

The idea spread, and is in use by many Salvation Army charities worldwide. Innovations from the crab pot have included self ringing kettles, booths that play Christmas music, and Credit Card capabilities.

Since 1997, the Christmas kettle campaign is traditionally kicked off during the halftime of the Dallas Cowboys Thanksgiving Day football game. An oversized kettle sits just outside the playing field, which has on several occasions been featured after touchdown celebrations. Under NFL rules such celebrations result in league fines, which players pay without objection, often donating an equal amount to the Salvation Army.

== Anonymous donations ==
A tradition has developed in the United States where, in some places, gold coins are anonymously inserted into the kettles in which the bell ringers collect donations. The tradition appears to have started in the Midwest when the first known drop of a gold coin was put into a kettle in Crystal Lake, Illinois in 1982.

Since this drop, many others have taken to dropping not only gold coins, but also other bullion and rare coins, gold medals, jewelry, and large checks.

The anonymous donations have included:

- Various bullion and rare coins:
  - American Gold Eagle
  - Krugerrand
  - United States Quarter Eagle
  - United States Double Eagle
  - Counterfeit 1804 dollar
- Jewelry
  - 1/3-carat diamond ring
  - Five gold rings (invoking the song The Twelve Days of Christmas)
- Checks for $14,845.00 and for $500,000.00
- Gold teeth
