= Coert Steynberg =

South African sculptor and medallist

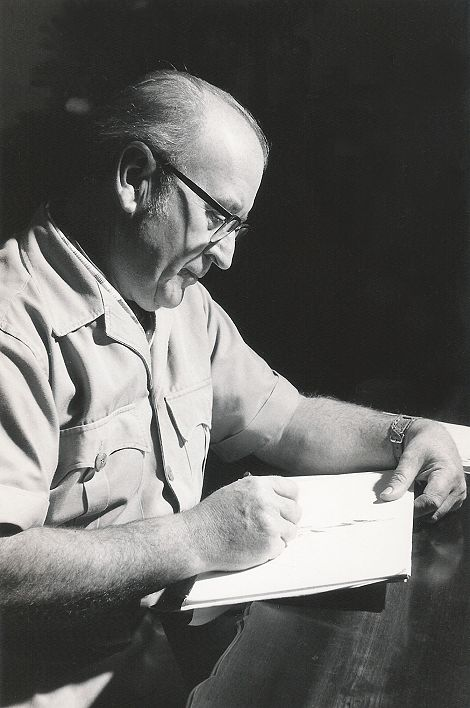
- Sculpting the Dias statue, 1933
- Born: Coert Lourens Steynberg; 7 January 1905; Hennops River, Transvaal Colony
- Died: 28 July 1982 (aged 77); Pretoria, South Africa
- Education: Rhodes University; Royal College of Art
- Known for: sculpture, drawing
- Notable work: Monuments, Statues, Coin Design
- Movement: Modernism
- Awards: Honorary Life Membership: Royal Society of Arts, London; Honorary Life Membership: South African Arts Association; Honorary Membership: International Society of Arts and Letters, Lausanne, Switzerland; D.Phil. (Honoris Causa): University of Pretoria; Medal: Academia Nacional de Belas Artes, Portugal; Medal: Admiralty of the Navy, Portugal; Medal of Honour: South African Academy of Science & Art

Coert Steynberg (7 January 1905 – 28 July 1982) was a South African sculptor and medallist who worked in stone, marble, bronze, copper and wood. His work is represented nationwide and internationally, including a statue of Bartholomew Dias in South Africa House in London, a monument to Andries Pretorius in Graaff-Reinet, and the Peace of Vereeniging monument in Vereeniging. He was the son of Johannes Lodewikus and Magdalena Susanna (Née Hamman). He married Elizabeth Johanna Maria Bosman.

Steynberg is best known for sculpting a statue of Paul Kruger, found at the Kruger-gate, Kruger National Park. His most famous coin design is the pronking springbok on all gold Krugerrands. The springbok design was reused on the 5 shilling and 50 cents crowns from 1947 to 1964, the gold 1/2 Pound and 1 Pound coins of the 1952-60 issues, the gold 1 Rand and 2 Rand of the 1961-83 issues, and on the Krugerrand medal-coin issues that have been issued since 1967.

While Steynberg is famous for his huge statues of public figures, his many private works are of his most definitive works, such as his well-known statuette of the dancing Mabalel. In later life his works tended to be of a more abstract nature. He experimented with a wide variety of materials, such as lacquer, coloured glass, wire mesh and ceramic.
