= Mac-Mac =

Historical area in the Mpumalanga province of South Africa

Coordinates: 24.991°S 30.813°E

Mac-Mac is a historical area in the Mpumalanga province of South Africa, and the site of the country's earliest gold rush. It is located near the town of Sabie, 5 km from Pilgrim's Rest.

While a number of small gold deposits had been discovered in the northern parts of South Africa between 1840 and 1870, Mac-Mac was the first place where payable quantities of gold were found. In 1873 gold was discovered on the farm Geelhoutboom. President Burgers officially named the area the New Caledonian Gold Fields, but it became known as Mac-Mac because of the amount of Scottish diggers at the camp. Within one year, 1,500 diggers made 4,000 claims.

The nearby Mac Mac twin falls, originally a single stream, acquired their current appearance when gold miners blasted the stream to reach the gold-bearing reef over which it drops.

In the late 1990s the old forestry station and forester houses were used to start the Mac Mac Forest Retreat.
