= Krugerrand =

South African gold coin

- South Africa
- Value: None specified (implied value equal to gold content)
- Mass: 33.93 g (1.09 troy oz)
- Diameter: 32.77 mm (1.28 in)
- Thickness: 2.84 mm (0.11 in)
- Composition: Gold (91.67% Au, 8.33% Cu)
- Years of minting: 1967–present

Obverse
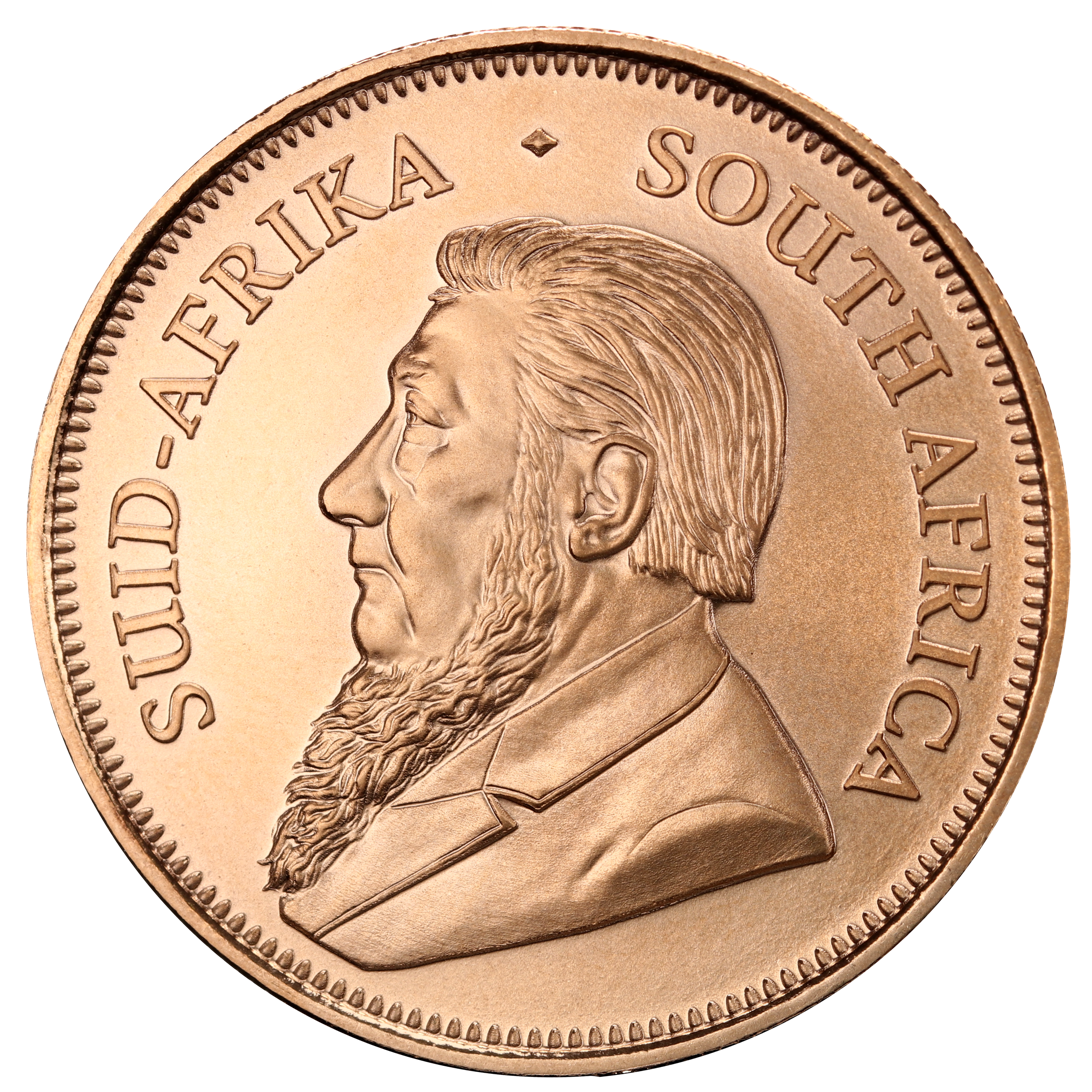
- Design: 1892 by Otto Schultz – Profile of Paul Kruger with "SUID‑AFRIKA · SOUTH AFRICA" in the legend

Reverse
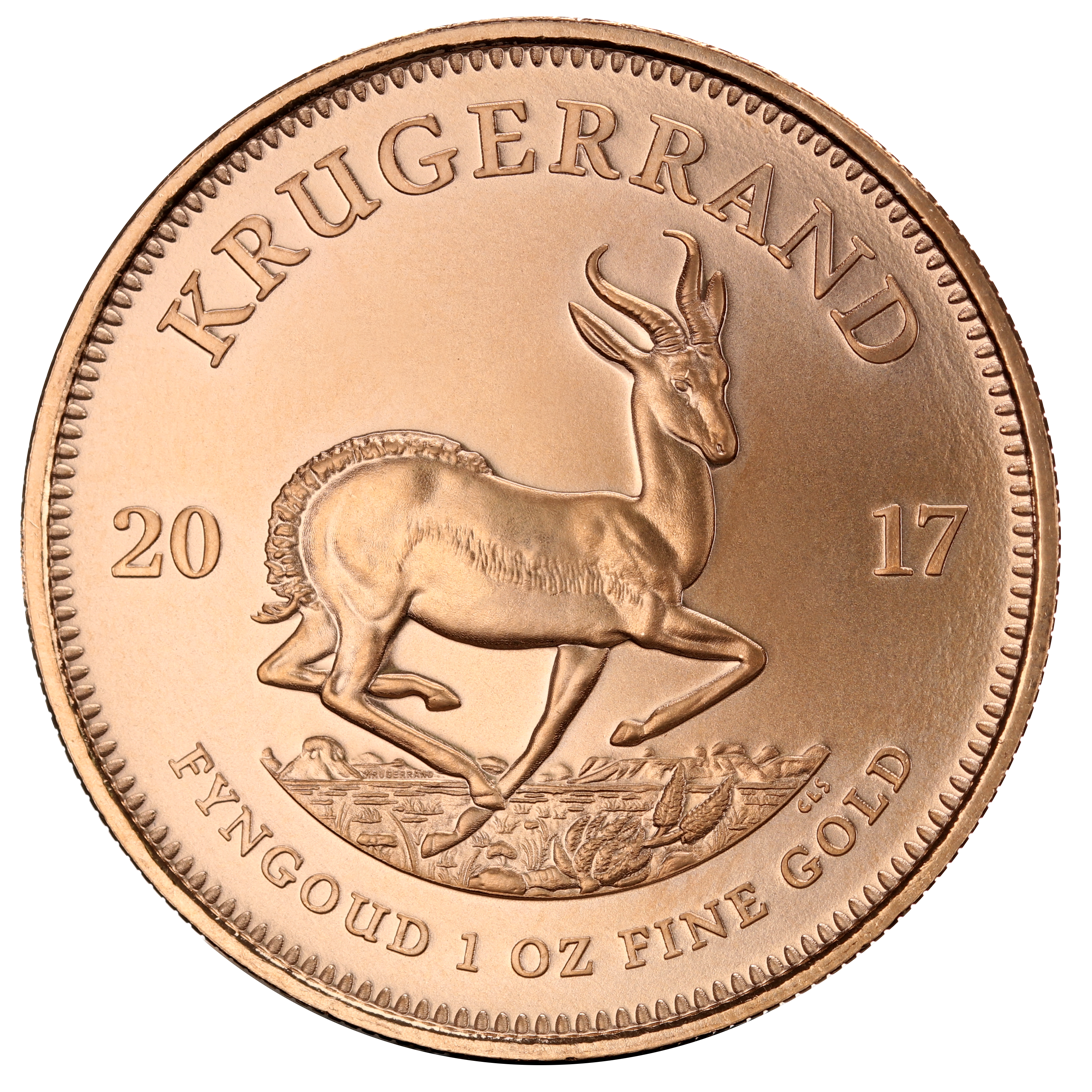
- Design: 1947 by Coert Steynberg – A pronking springbok antelope with the mint date in the field. The legend is inscribed with "KRUGERRAND", the year of minting and the gold weight in Afrikaans and English.

The Krugerrand (/ˈkruːɡərænd/; Afrikaans: [ˈkry.ərˌrant]) is a South African coin, first minted on 3 July 1967 to help market South African gold and produced by Rand Refinery and the South African Mint. The name is a compound of Paul Kruger, the former President of the South African Republic (depicted on the obverse), and rand, the South African unit of currency. On the reverse side of the Krugerrand is a pronking springbok, South Africa's national animal.

By 1980, the Krugerrand accounted for more than 90% of the global gold coin market and was the number one choice for investors buying gold. However, during the 1980s and 1990s, Krugerrands fell out of favor as some Western countries forbade import of the Krugerrand because of its association with the apartheid government of South Africa.

Unlike virtually all other modern bullion coins, Krugerrands have no nominal face value. Yet they are considered legal tender in South Africa by the South African Reserve Bank Act (SARBA) of 1989 based solely on their gold content. This feature distinguishes them from contemporary sovereign bullion coins like the American Gold Eagle which have face values that are merely symbolic and far below the market value of their metal content. The Krugerrand’s "denomination" is therefore implicitly 'one ounce of fine gold' (or the fractional equivalent). The only significant historical parallel is the British gold sovereign, which likewise bears no face value but is legally recognized as one pound sterling.

To celebrate the Krugerrand's 50 year anniversary in 2017, the Rand Refinery began minting silver versions with the same overall design as the gold coin. According to the online collector database Numista, the non-commemorative, 1 oz silver bullion Krugerrands have been minted regularly ever since.

== History ==
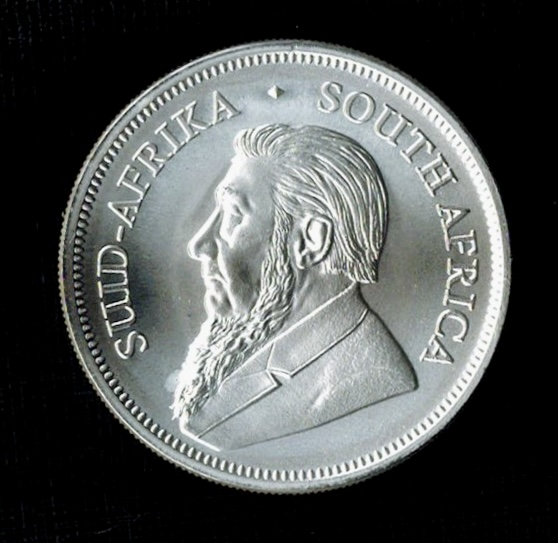
2022 South Africa 1 oz silver Krugerrand obverse

The Krugerrand was introduced in 1967 as a vehicle for private ownership of gold. Like most circulating gold coins from the pre-World War 1 era, the Krugerrand was minted in a 22k copper-gold alloy far more durable than pure gold. By 1980, the Krugerrand accounted for 90% of the global gold coin market. That year, South Africa introduced three smaller coins containing 1/2, 1/4, and 1/10 troy ounce (15.6, 7.8, and 3.1 g) of gold.

Economic sanctions against South Africa for its policy of apartheid made the Krugerrand an illegal import in many Western countries during the 1970s and 1980s, with the United States, which had historically been the largest market for the coin, banning imports in 1985: the previous year, over US$600 million of Krugerrands had been marketed in the country. Although gold coin imports could be sanctioned, gold imports could not be sanctioned more generally at the time, due to the West's reliance on South African gold production, so this did not have a great effect on the South African economy.

Most of these sanctions were removed in 1991 after the South African government took steps to end its apartheid policies.

By 2017, over 53 million troy ounces of gold Krugerrands have been sold since their launch in 1967, comprising more than 60 million individual coins (including bullion and fractional sizes).

== Variations and imitations ==
During the bull market in gold of the 1970s, the gold Krugerrand quickly became the primary choice for gold investors worldwide. Over 36 million gold bullion Krugerrands were minted from 1970 to 1980. Between 1974 and 1985, it is estimated that 22 million gold Krugerrand coins were imported into the United States alone. This huge success of the Krugerrand encouraged other gold-producing countries to mint and issue gold bullion coins of their own, including the Canadian Gold Maple Leaf in 1979, the Australian Nugget in 1987, the Chinese Gold Panda in 1982, the American Gold Eagle in 1986, and the British Britannia coin in 1987.

== Properties ==
The coin is so named because the obverse, designed by Otto Schultz, bears the face of Boer statesman Paul Kruger, four-term president of the old South African Republic. The reverse depicts a springbok, the national animal of South Africa. The image was designed by Coert Steynberg and was previously used on the reverse of the earlier South African five shillings (1947–51 and 1953–59) and 50-cent (1961–64) coins. The name "South Africa" and the gold content are inscribed in both Afrikaans and English (as can be seen on the pictures of the coin).

Confusingly among modern gold bullion coins, the specified weight (1 troy oz etc.) refers to the precious metals content only. This is why the 1 troy oz. Krugerrand actually weighs 1.09 troy oz. (33.9 g) total.

The word "Krugerrand" is a registered trademark owned by Rand Refinery Limited, of Germiston.

Weight	Diameter	Thickness	Gross weight	Fineness	Gold content		Reeds along edge	Grade
1 troy oz	32.77mm	2.84mm	33.930 g	22k (91.67% pure)	31.103 g	1 troy oz	180	Bullion
1/2 troy oz	27.07mm	2.215mm	16.965 g	22k (91.67% pure)	15.552 g	0.5 troy oz	150	Bullion
1/4 troy oz	22.06mm	1.888mm	8.482 g	22k (91.67% pure)	7.776 g	0.25 troy oz	140	Bullion
1/10 oz	16.55mm	1.35mm	3.393 g	22k (91.67% pure)	3.110 g	0.10 troy oz	115	Bullion

== Proof Krugerrands ==
The South African Mint Company produces limited edition proof Krugerrands intended to be collector's items rather than financial assets. These coins are sold at prices significantly above market bullion value (like all proof coins). They can be distinguished from the bullion Krugerrands both by the crispness of its design and by the number of serrations on the coin's edge. Proof coins have 220 edge serrations, while bullion coins have 160.

== 50th Anniversary Krugerrands ==
2017 marked the 50th year of issuance (1967–2017), and to commemorate the anniversary, the South African Mint produced "Premium Uncirculated" versions in 0.9167 fine (or 22 k pure) gold. Additionally, the first platinum (0.999 fine) and silver (0.999 fine) Krugerrands were minted. The issue limit for these commemorative platinum, gold, and silver coins was 2,017 for platinum, 5,000 for gold, and 1,000,000 for silver. The commemorative issues are distinguished by a '50' privy seal mark above the springbok design on the reverse for the platinum and silver issues and to the right of the springbok design on the gold issues. In addition to the "Premium Uncirculated" issue, 15,000 silver "Proof" Krugerrands were also issued, as well as "Proof" Krugerrands in gold and platinum.

== Export control ==
The South African Reserve Bank restricts the exportation of Krugerrands by a South African resident to a non-resident to a maximum of R30,000 (about US$1,800 or €1,540 as of May 2026). Visitors to South Africa can export up to 15 coins by declaring the items to the South African Revenue Service.

== Charitable donations ==
In the 21st century, Krugerrands have received media attention in the United States after anonymous donors have left the valuable coin in the Salvation Army's annual "Christmas Kettle" donation jars in various cities around the country.

== See also ==
- Bullion
- Bullion coin
- Economy of South Africa
- Gold as an investment
- Inflation hedge
- Silver as an investment
- Mosi-oa-Tunya (coin)
