= South African pound =

National currency (1910–1961)

Suid-Afrikaanse pond (Afrikaans)
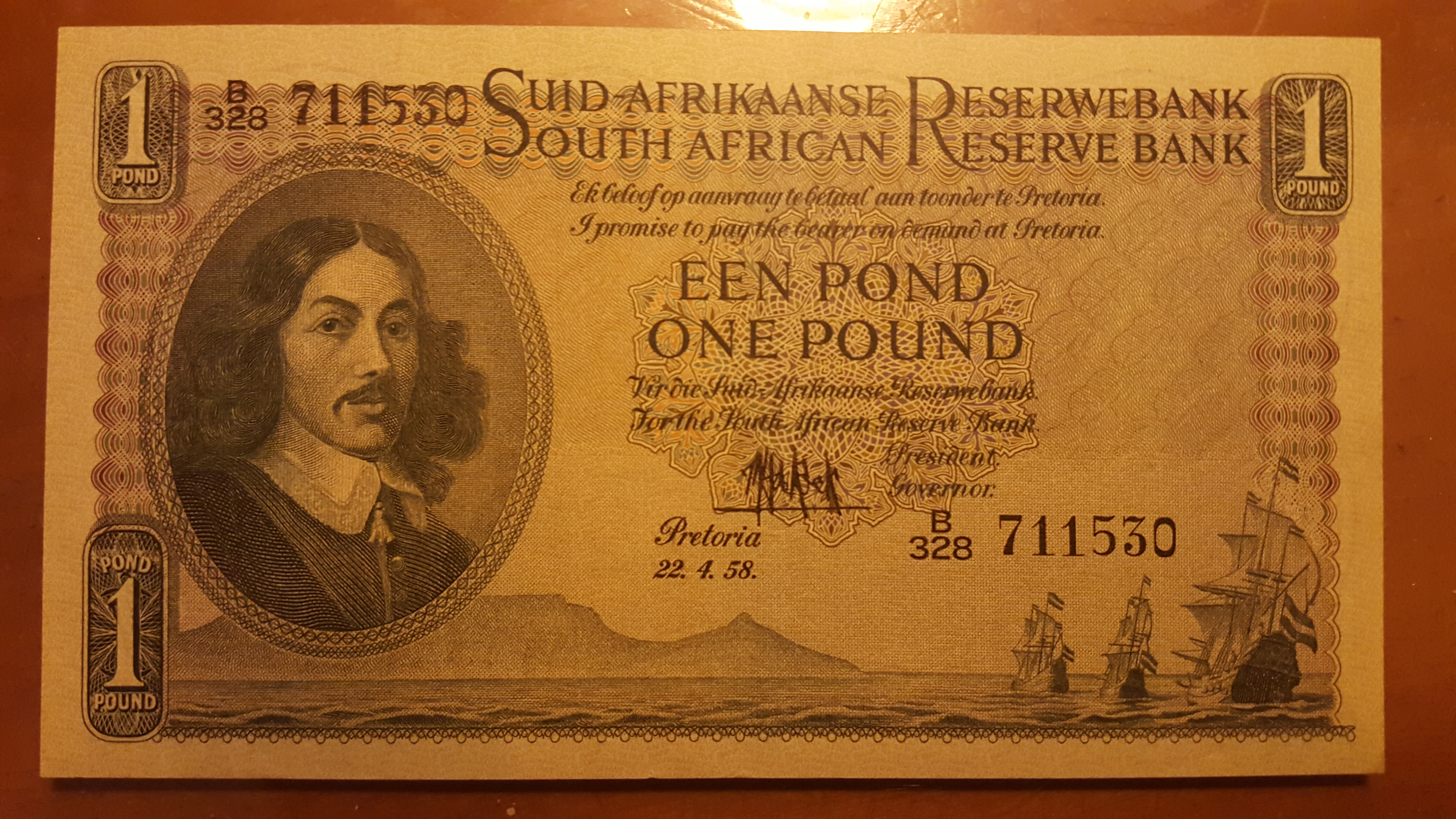
- £1 note from 1958

Unit
- Plural: pond (Afrikaans)
- Symbol: £

Denominations
- Subunit
- 1/20: shilling (sjieling)
- 1/240: penny (pennie)
- Plural
- penny (pennie): pence (English)
- Symbol
- shilling (sjieling): s or /–
- penny (pennie): d
- Banknotes: 10/–, £1, £5, £10, and £100
- Coins
- Freq. used: 1/4d, 1/2d, 1d, 3d, 6d, 1/–, 2/–, 2/6
- Rarely used: 5/–

Demographics
- User(s): Union of South Africa; Basutoland; Bechuanaland Protectorate; Swaziland Protectorate; Stellaland; Goshen

Issuance
- Central bank: South African Reserve Bank
- Website: www.resbank.co.za
- This infobox shows the latest status before this currency was rendered obsolete.

The pound (Afrikaans: pond; symbol £, £SA for distinction) was the currency of the Union of South Africa from the formation of the country as a British dominion in 1910. It was replaced by the rand in 1961 when South Africa decimalised.

In 1825, an imperial order-in-council made sterling coinage legal tender in all the British colonies. At that time, the only British colony in Southern Africa was the Cape Colony. As time went on, sterling and its associated coinage became the currency of every British territory in Southern Africa. At that time sterling followed the Carolingian monetary system of a pound divided into 20 shillings, each of 12 pence.

== History ==
The pound sterling became the standard currency of the Cape of Good Hope colony in 1825 following an imperial order-in-council that was issued for the purpose of introducing sterling coinage into all British colonies. British coins then replaced the Dutch currency. Before a unified South Africa, many authorities issued coins and banknotes in values equivalent to sterling.

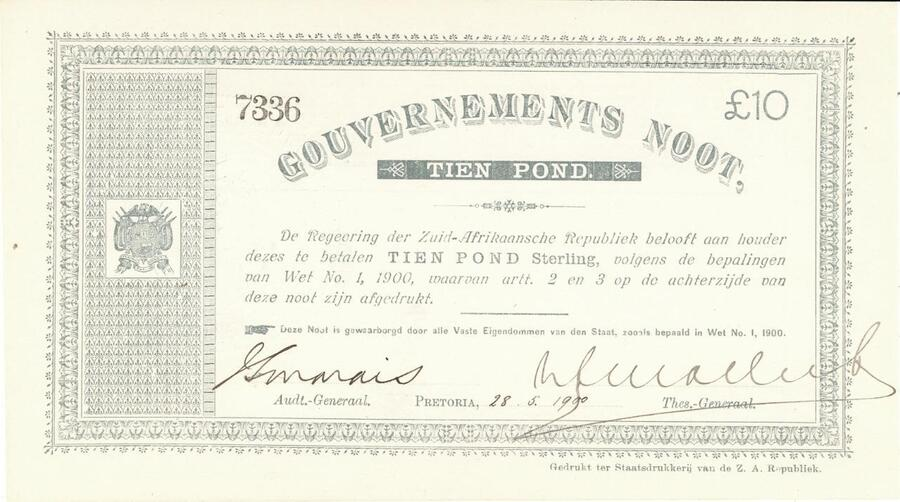
An old 10 pound banknote from the South African Republic

The Transvaal Republic, the Boer state that in 1902 was to become Transvaal Colony, issued notes from 1867 to 1902 and coins from 1892 to 1902. The denominations of the gold coins were inscribed in Afrikaans, thus reading "pond" instead of "pound".

In 1920, the Treasury issued gold certificate notes. The following year, the South African Reserve Bank was established as the sole note issuing authority. Coins were issued from 1923. The South African pound remained equal to sterling throughout its existence, except for a short period following the abandonment of the gold standard in the United Kingdom in 1931. When the United Kingdom abandoned the gold standard in September 1931, Canada quickly followed suit because it had been under exactly the same pressure as the United Kingdom. The contraction of the money supply in the United States had been causing large amounts of gold bullion to flow west across the Atlantic Ocean, and south into the United States. The situation in South Africa was different, because gold exportation to London was a major business. According to Jan Smuts in his biography, the Nationalists specifically wanted to make a point of not automatically following suit with the United Kingdom, and they perceived that they were in a strong position to do so. For the United Kingdom and Canada, an outflow of gold was seen as a flight of gold, whereas for South Africa the same was seen as a profitable enterprise. The effect of South Africa's continuing adherence to the gold standard did not however turn out as Prime Minister J. B. M. Hertzog might have hoped. The South African pound rose dramatically in value against sterling, and this virtually crippled South Africa's gold export industry overnight. By 1933, Hertzog abandoned the gold standard and the South African pound returned to parity with sterling. The relief was felt almost immediately

The South African pound was replaced during decimalisation by the rand on 14 February 1961 at a rate of R 2 = £SA 1. The rand retained a 2:1 parity with sterling until sterling's devaluation in 1967 when South Africa did not follow suit.

== State-issued coinage ==
=== Transvaal Republic ===
In 1892, the Transvaal Republic introduced coins in denominations of 1d, 3d, 6d, 1/–, 2/–, 2/6, 5/–, £1/2 (10/–) and £1. The last of these coins were issued in 1900, except for siege £1 coins issued in 1902.

=== Union of South Africa ===
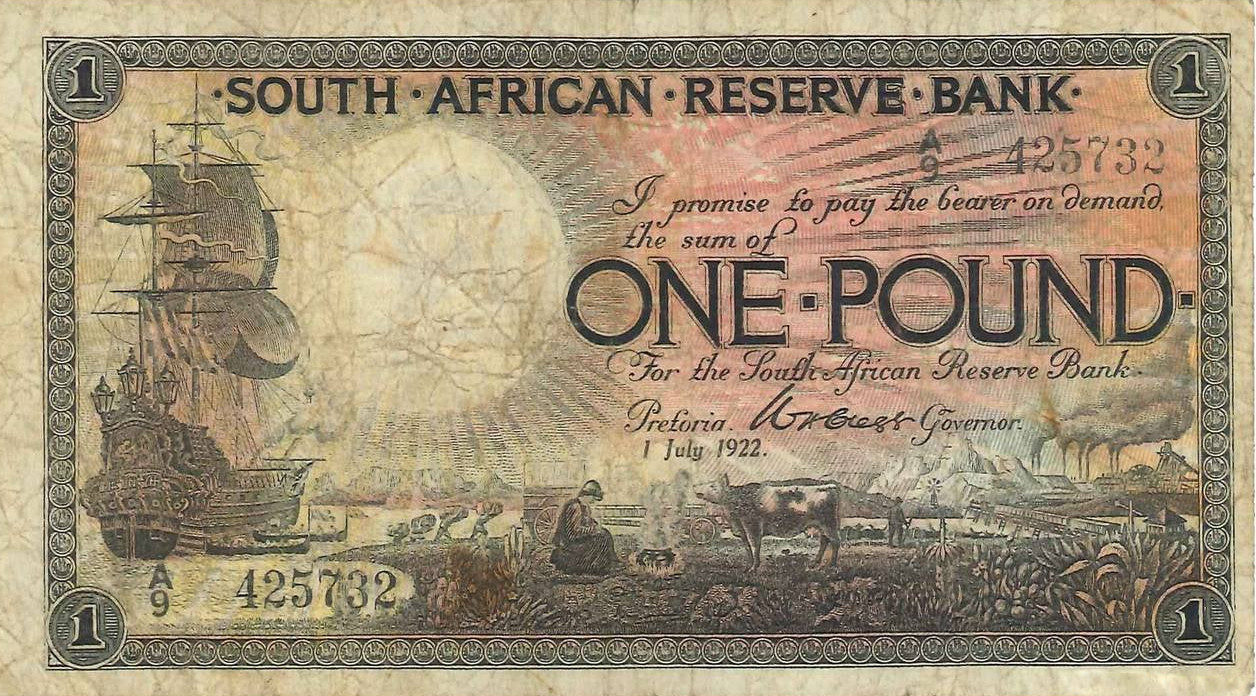
The South African Reserve Bank printed its first run of £1 (equivalent to R631 in 2018) notes in 1922.

The Union of South Africa issued coins from 1923, in denominations of 1/4d, 1/2d, 1d, 3d and 6d, 1/–, 2/– (initially denominated as a florin), 2/6, £1/2 and £1. (The £1/2 and £1 were gold coins known as the half sovereign and sovereign respectively.) The coins were the same weights as the corresponding sterling coins but the silver coins (3d up to 2/6) were struck in .800 fineness silver. Gold coins were struck until 1932.

In 1947, 5/– coins were introduced, with occasional commemorative variants. In 1951, the silver coinage switched to .500 fineness. Gold bullion £1/2 and £1 coins were issued from 1952 in the same specifications as the 1/2 and 1 sovereign.

All the coins had the monarch on the obverse, with the titles in Latin, while the reverse had the denomination and "South Africa" written in English and Afrikaans.

== Banknotes ==
The government of the Cape Colony issued a £1 note in 1835 and a £20 note in 1834. Between 1869 and 1872, the ZAR in Transvaal issued notes for 6d, 1/–, 2/6, 5/–, 10/–, £1, £5 and £10. The National Bank of the ZAR issued £1 notes between 1892 and 1893. During the Second Boer War, government notes were issued in denominations of £1, £5, £10, £20, £50 and £100.

In 1920, Treasury gold certificate notes were issued in denominations of £1, £5, £100, £1,000 and £10,000, in Afrikaans and English script. From 1921, the South African Reserve Bank took over the issuance of paper money, introducing notes for 10/–, £1, £5, £20 and £100. £20 notes were last issued in 1933, with £10 notes added in 1943.

All banknotes were bilingual in English and Afrikaans. From 1948, two variants of each note were issued, one with English written first and the other with Afrikaans written first.

== See also ==
- Coins of the South African pound
- South African rand
- Coins of the South African rand
- Economy of South Africa
