= Economy of Bangladesh =

- Currency: Bangladeshi taka (BDT, ৳)
- Fiscal year: 1 July – 30 June
- Trade organizations: SAFTA, SAARC, BIMSTEC, WTO, SASEC, UNCTAD, WCO, COMCEC, IORA, Developing-8, G77, AIIB, ADB, The Commonwealth, and others
- Country group: Least Developed; Lower-middle-income economy

Statistics
- Population: ▲178,106,136 (2026)
- GDP: ▲$506 billion (nominal; 2026 est.); ▲$1.9 trillion (PPP; 2026 est.)
- GDP rank: 36th (nominal; 2026); 26th (PPP; 2026)
- GDP growth: ▼4.2% (2024); ▼3.5% (2025); ▲4.7% (2026f); ▼3.5% (2027f)
- GDP per capita: ▲$2,841 (nominal, 2026 est.); ▲$10,850 (PPP, 2026 est.)
- GDP per capita rank: 140th (nominal, 2026); 125th (PPP, 2026)
- GDP per capita growth: ▼2.2% (2025)
- GDP by sector: Agriculture: 11.2%; Industry: 37.65%; Services: 51.24%; (FY25)
- Inflation (CPI): ▲9.16% (July 2026)
- Population below national poverty line: ▲19.2% (2025); 20% (rural); 16.5% (urban); ▲5.6% living in extreme poverty (2024); 6.5% (rural); 3.8% (urban)
- Gini coefficient: ▼30.9 medium (2022)
- Human Development Index: ▲0.685 medium (2023) (130th); ▲0.482 low IHDI (2023) (113th)
- Corruption Perceptions Index: ▲24 out of 100 points (2025, 150th rank)
- Labor force: 77,355,168 (2024); Female 36.9%; ▲61.9% employment rate (2024)
- Labor force by occupation: Agriculture: 35%; Industry: 21%; Services: 44%; (2023)
- Unemployment: ▲3.6% (2024)
- Informal employment: 80.8% (2024)
- Average gross salary: ৳26867 (US$220) per month (2023)
- Average net salary: ৳26867 (US$220) per month (2023)
- Final consumption expenditure: ▲76% of GDP (2024)
- Gross capital formation: 31% of GDP (2024)
- Gross savings: ▼24% of GDP (2024)
- Main industries: Textiles; pharmaceutical products; electronics; shipbuilding; automotive; bicycle; leather; jute; glass; paper; plastic; food and beverages; cement; tea; rice; natural gas and crude petroleum; iron and steel; ship breaking

External
- Exports: $48.28 billion (2025)
- Export goods: Cotton textiles and knitwear, jute and jute goods, leather and leather goods, home textiles, pharmaceuticals, processed food, electronic and technological products.
- Main export partners: United States(+) 18%; Germany(+) 10.96%; United Kingdom(+) 9.57%; Spain(+) 7.36%; France(+) 5%; Netherlands(+) 4.88%; Italy(+) 3.45%; Canada(+) 3.3%; Japan(+) 2.93%; Belgium(+) 1.51%; Others 30% (2025)
- Imports: $61 billion (2025)
- Import goods: Liquified natural gas, crude oil and petroleum, machinery and equipment, chemicals, cotton, foodstuffs
- Main import partners: China(+) 26.4%; India(+) 14.3%; Indonesia(+) 5.6%; Brazil(+) 4.2%; Malaysia(+) 4.1%; United States(+) 4.0%; Singapore(+) 4.0%; Qatar(+) 3.3%; Japan(+) 2.9%; Saudi Arabia(+) 2.7%; Others 28.5% (2024)
- FDI stock: ▲ Inward: $18.8 billion (FY24); ▲ Outward: $35.04 million (FY25)
- Current account: ▲ −$432 million; ▲0% of GDP; (FY25)
- Gross external debt: ▼$112 billion; (FY25)

Public finance
- Government debt: ▼40.2% of GDP (2026)
- Foreign reserves: ▲$37.58 billion (Gross); ▲$32.93 billion (NIR); (July 2026)
- Budget balance: −4.12% of GDP (2025 est.)
- Revenue: ▲ ৳433000 crore (US$35 billion) (2022-2023)
- Spending: ▲ ৳678064 crore (US$55 billion) (2022-2023)
- Credit rating: Standard & Poor's: B+ (Domestic); B+ (Foreign); B+ (T&C Assessment); Outlook: Stable; Moody's: B2; Outlook: Negative; Fitch: B+; Outlook: Stable
- All values, unless otherwise stated, are in US dollars.

The economy of Bangladesh is a developing, market-oriented economy. In the 2025–26 fiscal year its nominal GDP was estimated at US$501 billion, making it the second-largest economy in South Asia. As of 2026, it ranked 36th in nominal terms and 26th by purchasing power parity. Bangladesh is a member of the World Trade Organization and the South Asian Free Trade Area, and Bangladesh was recognized by Goldman Sachs as a member of the Next Eleven, in 2012.

Economic reforms promoting free markets and foreign direct investment began in the late 1970s. Since the 1990s, the ready-made garments industry has become the country's main export sector, accounting for over 80% of total exports. Remittances from the Bangladeshi diaspora are a major source of foreign exchange, and the pharmaceutical industry supplies 98% of domestic demand. Agriculture is supported by government subsidies. The private sector accounts for about 80% of GDP, and small and medium-sized enterprises (SME) make up about 90% of businesses.

GDP growth slowed to 3.49% in FY2024–25. The BBS’s provisional estimate for FY2025–26 is around 3.6% to 4.7%. The economy faces challenges including low tax revenue (roughly 8% to 9% of GDP in recent fiscal years), a non-performing loans in the banking sector, and structural infrastructure bottlenecks affecting uneven industrial growth. Bangladesh is scheduled to graduate from least developed country status on 24 November 2029.

== Economic history ==
=== Precolonial period ===
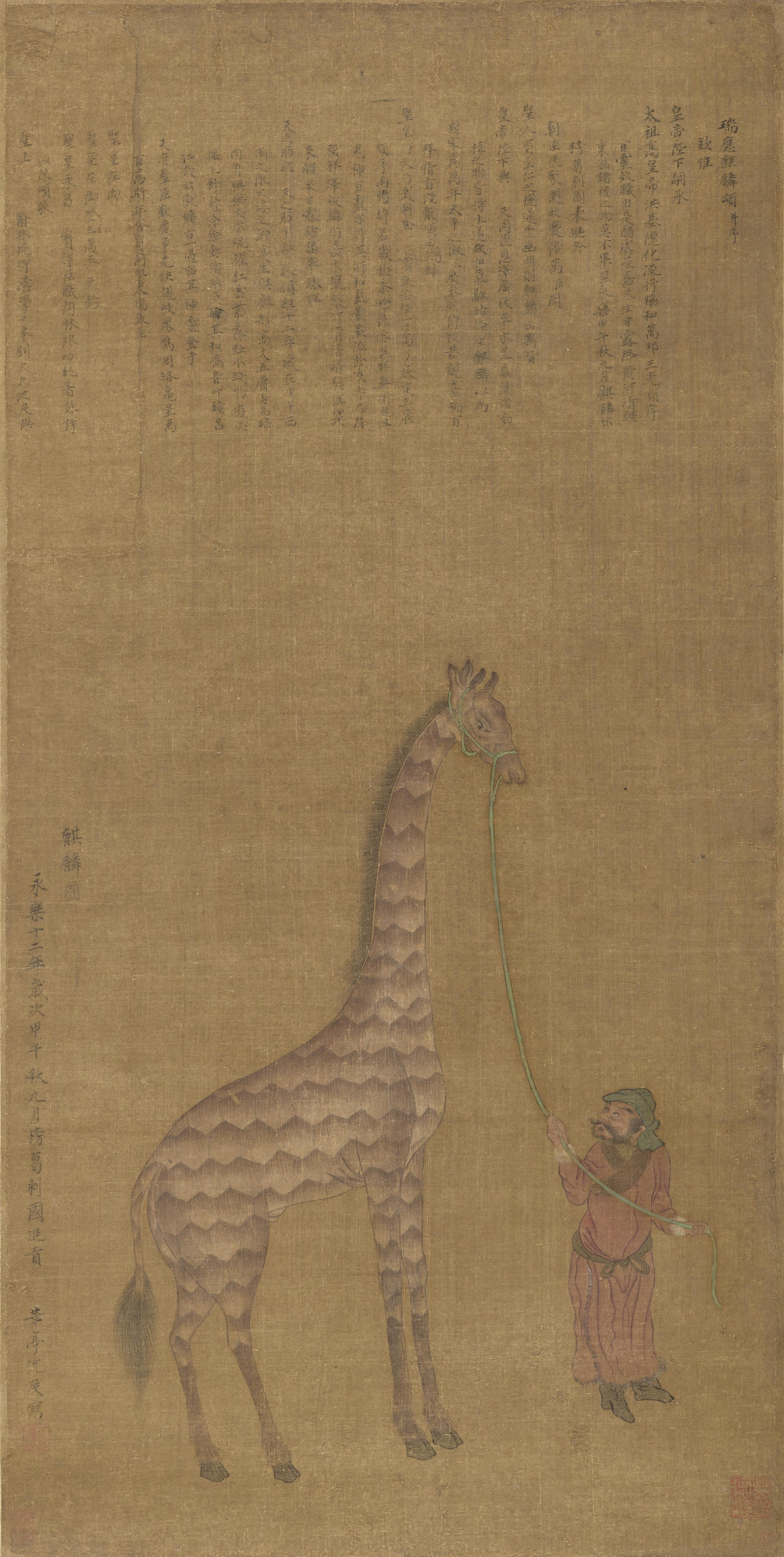
This African giraffe was imported into Bengal region and re-exported to China circa 1415.

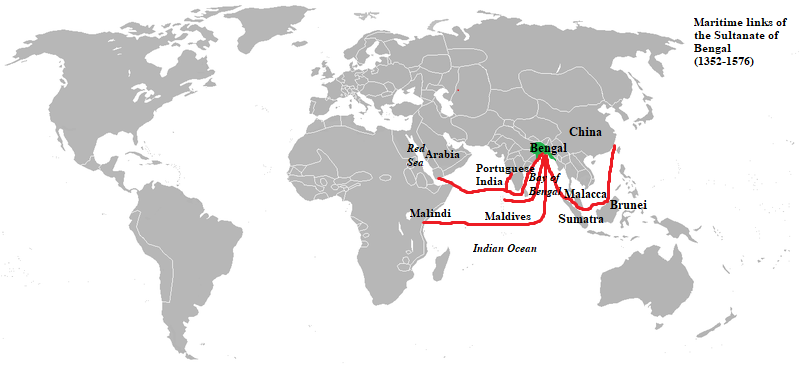
The major maritime trade routes of the Bengal Sultanate

Punch-marked coins are the earliest form of currency found in Bangladesh (Bengal region of Ancient India), dating back to the Iron Age and the first millennium BCE. 1st century Roman coins with images of Hercules have been excavated in Bangladesh and point to trade links with the Roman world. The Wari-Bateshwar ruins are believed to be the emporium (trading center) of Sounagoura mentioned by Roman geographer Claudius Ptolemy. The eastern segment of Bengal was a historically prosperous region. The Ganges Delta provided advantages of a mild, almost tropical climate, fertile soil, ample water, and an abundance of fish, wildlife, and fruit. Living standards for the elite were comparatively better than other parts of the Indian subcontinent. Trade routes like the Grand Trunk Road, Tea Horse Road and Silk Road connected the region to the wider neighborhood. Between 400 and 1200, the region had a well-developed economy in terms of land ownership, agriculture, livestock, shipping, trade, commerce, taxation, and banking. Muslim trade with Bengal increased after the fall of the Sasanian Empire and the Arab takeover of Persian trade routes. Much of this trade occurred east of the Meghna River in southeastern Bengal. After 1204, Muslim conquerors inherited the gold and silver reserves of pre-Islamic kingdoms.

The Bengal Sultanate presided over a mercantile empire of its own. Bengali ships were the largest ships in the Bay of Bengal and other parts of the Indian Ocean trade network. Ship-owning merchants often acted as royal envoys of the Sultan. A large number of wealthy Bengali merchants and shipowners lived in Malacca. A vessel from Bengal transported embassies from Brunei and Sumatra to China. Bengal and the Maldives operated the largest shell currency network in history. A Masai giraffe from Malindi in Africa was shipped to Bengal and later gifted to the Emperor of China as a gift from the Sultan of Bengal. The rulers of Arakan looked to Bengal for economic, political and cultural capital. The Sultan of Bengal financed projects in the Hejaz region of Arabia.

Under Mughal rule, Bengal operated as a centre of the worldwide muslin, silk and pearl trades. Domestically, much of India depended on Bengali products such as rice, silks and cotton textiles. Overseas, Europeans depended on Bengali products such as cotton textiles, silks and opium; Bengal accounted for 40% of Dutch imports from Asia, for example. Bengal shipped saltpeter to Europe, sold opium in Indonesia, exported raw silk to Japan and the Netherlands, and produced cotton and silk textiles for export to Europe, Indonesia and Japan. Real wages and living standards in 18th-century Bengal were comparable to Britain, which in turn had the highest living standards in Europe.

During the Mughal era, the most important centre of cotton production was Bengal, particularly around its capital city of Dhaka, leading to muslin being called "daka" in distant markets such as Central Asia. Bengali agriculturalists rapidly learned techniques of mulberry cultivation and sericulture, establishing Bengal as a major silk-producing region of the world. Bengal accounted for more than 50% of textiles and around 80% of silks imported by the Dutch from Asia, for example.

Bengal also had a large shipbuilding industry. The shipbuilding output of Bengal during the sixteenth and seventeenth centuries was 223,250 tons annually, compared with 23,061 tons produced in nineteen colonies in North America from 1769 to 1771. The region was also a center of ship-repairing. Bengali shipbuilding was advanced compared to European shipbuilding at the time. An important innovation in shipbuilding was the introduction of a flushed deck design in Bengal rice ships, resulting in hulls that were stronger and less prone to leak than the structurally weak hulls of traditional European ships built with a stepped deck design. The English East India Company later duplicated the flushed-deck and hull designs of Bengal rice ships in the 1760s, leading to significant improvements in seaworthiness and navigation for European ships during the Industrial Revolution. Among the oldest businesses from the pre-colonial and Mughal periods, the biryani restaurant Fakhruddin's traces its history to the era of the Nawabs of Bengal.

=== Colonial period ===
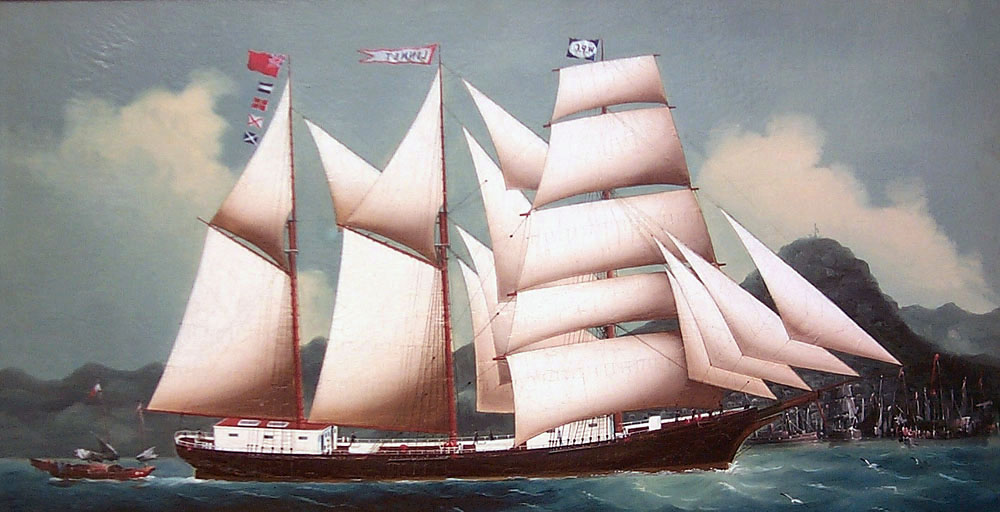
The Barkentine Linnet, a ship built in Chittagong, off the coast of Hong Kong circa 1890

The British East India Company, that took complete control of Bengal in 1793 by abolishing Nizamat (local rule), chose to develop Calcutta, now the capital city of West Bengal, as their commercial and administrative center for the Company-held territories in South Asia. The development of East Bengal was thereafter limited to agriculture. The administrative infrastructure of the late eighteenth and nineteenth centuries focused on East Bengal's function as a primarily agricultural producer—chiefly of rice, tea, teak, cotton, sugar cane and jute — for processors and traders in the British Empire. British rule saw the introduction of railways. The Hardinge Bridge was built to carry trains across the Padma River. In the early 20th century, Eastern Bengal and Assam was established in the British Raj to promote jobs, education and investment in East Bengal. In 1928, the Port of Chittagong was declared to be a "Major Port" of British India. East Bengal extended its rice economy into Arakan Division in British Burma. The river and sea ports of East Bengal, including Goalundo Ghat, the Port of Dhaka, the Port of Narayanganj, and the Port of Chittagong became entrepots for trade between Bengal, Assam and Burma. Some of Bangladesh's venerable and oldest companies were born in British Bengal, including A K Khan & Company, M. M. Ispahani Limited, James Finlay Bangladesh, and Anwar Group of Industries.

=== Pakistan period ===
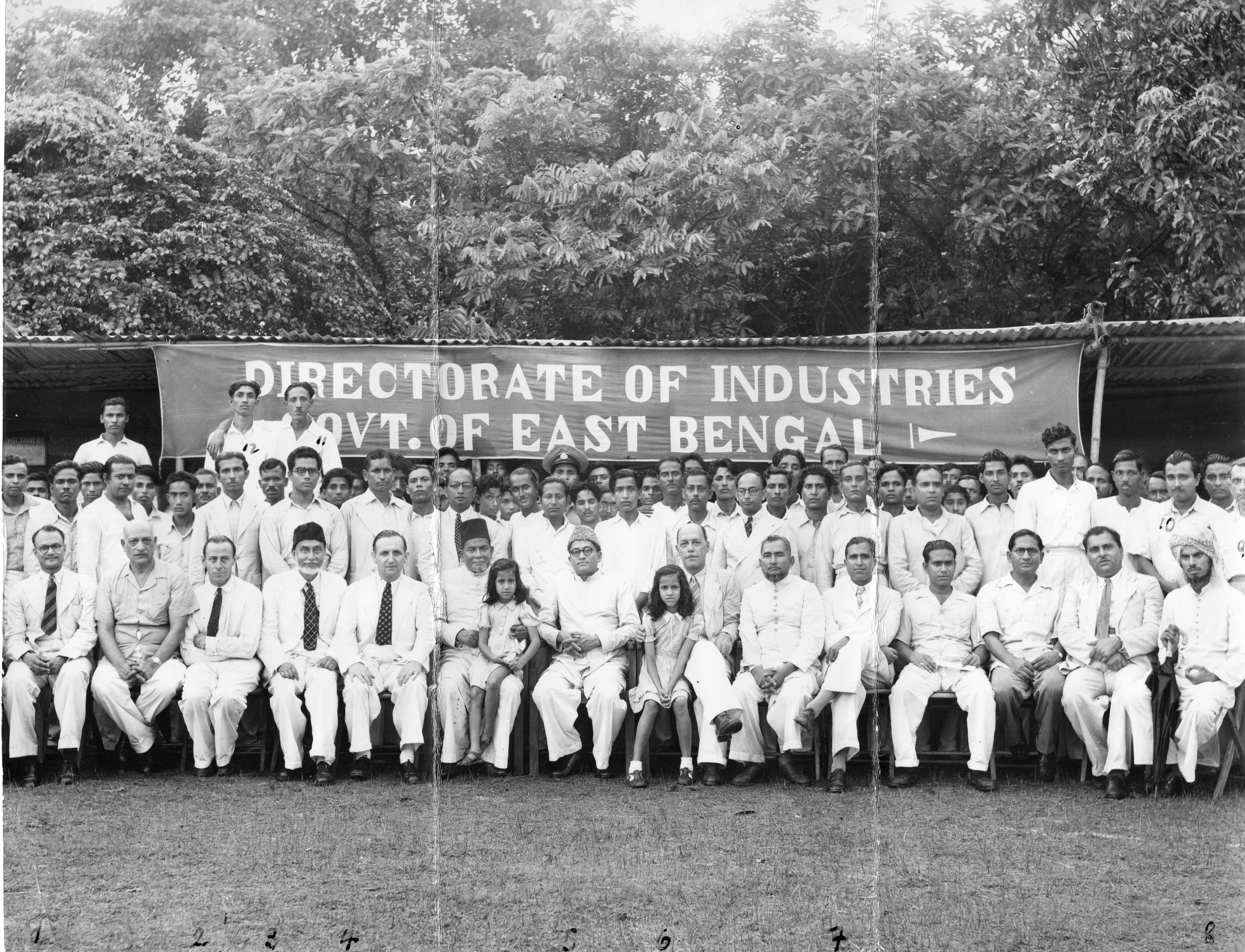
Tannery owners with members of the Directorate of Industries, Government of East Bengal in 1949

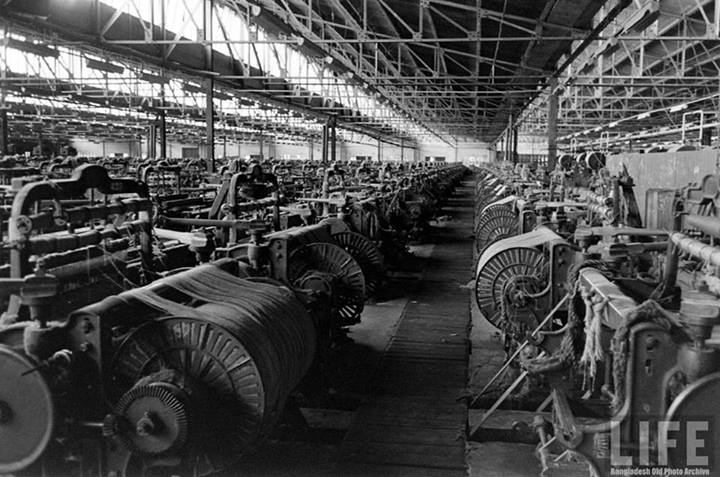
In the 1950s and 1960s, Adamjee Jute Mills was the largest jute processing plant in the world.

The partition of India changed the economic geography of the region. The Pakistani government in East Bengal prioritized industries based on local raw materials like jute, cotton, and leather. The Korean War drove up demand for jute products. Adamjee Jute Mills, the world's largest jute processing plant, was built in the Port of Narayanganj. The plant was a symbol of East Pakistan's industrialization. Living standards began to gradually improve. Labor reforms in 1958 eventually benefitted a future independent Bangladesh to develop industry. Free market principles were generally accepted. The government promoted an industrial policy which aimed to produce consumer goods as quickly as possible in order to avoid dependence on imports. Certain sectors, like public utilities, fell under state ownership. Natural gas in Sylhet was discovered by the Burmah Oil Company in 1955. By the late 1960s, East Pakistan's share of Pakistan's exports went down from 70% to 50%.

Pakistan's rulers launched a so-called "Decade of Development" that "resulted in numerous economic and social contradictions, which played themselves out, not just in the 1960s, but beyond, where Ayub Khan's rule created the social and economic conditions leading to the separation of East Pakistan". According to the World Bank, economic discrimination against East Pakistan included diverting foreign aid and other funds to West Pakistan, the use of East Pakistan's foreign-exchange surpluses to finance West Pakistani imports, and refusal by the central government to release funds allocated to East Pakistan. Rehman Sobhan paraphrased the Two-Nation Theory into the Two Economies Theory by arguing that East and West Pakistan diverged and became two different economies within one country.

=== Post-independence period ===
Since independence, the Bangladesh economy has improved. Average incomes in Bangladesh reached the same level as Pakistan around 2016 before exceeded Pakistan's levels substantially.

==== Socialist era (1972–1975) ====
After its independence from Pakistan, Bangladesh initially followed a socialist economy for five years, which proved to be a blunder by the Sheikh Mujibur Rahman-led Awami League government. During Mujib era, the state development strategy envolved every possible way to the extension of protectionism. Private companies had to operate under heavy regulation and restrictions. For example, profit limits were imposed on companies. Any company with revenues or profits above the limit were susceptible to nationalization. The state nationalized all banks, insurance companies, and 580 industrial plants. Many of the nationalized industries were abandoned by West Pakistanis during the war; while many pro-Awami League and other Bengali businesses also suffered nationalization of properties and industries. The Awami League initiated work for the Ghorashal Fertilizer Factory and the Ashuganj Power Station. In spite of restrictions, several of Bangladesh's leading companies in the future were founded during this period, including BEXIMCO and Advanced Chemical Industries. Land ownership was restricted to less than 25 bighas. Land owners with more than 25 bighas were subjected to taxes. Farmers had to sell their products at prices set by the government instead of the market.

Since Bangladesh followed a socialist economy, it underwent a slow growth of producing experienced entrepreneurs, managers, administrators, engineers, and technicians. There was hardly any foreign investment. There were critical shortages of essential food grains and other staples because of wartime disruptions. External markets for jute had been lost because of the instability of supply and the increasing popularity of synthetic substitutes. Foreign exchange resources were minuscule, and the banking and monetary systems were unreliable. Although Bangladesh had a large work force, the vast reserves of under trained and underpaid workers were largely illiterate, unskilled, and underemployed. Commercially exploitable industrial resources, except for natural gas, were lacking. Inflation, especially for essential consumer goods, ran between 300 and 400 percent.

The war of independence had crippled the transportation system. Hundreds of road and railroad bridges had been destroyed or damaged, and rolling stock was inadequate and in poor repair. The new country was still recovering from a severe cyclone that hit the area in 1970 and caused 250,000 deaths. India came forward immediately with critically measured economic assistance in the first months after Bangladesh achieved independence from Pakistan. Between December 1971 and January 1972, India committed US$232 million in aid to Bangladesh from the politico-economic aid India received from the US and USSR.

==== Military rule and economic reforms (1975–1990) ====
After 1975 coups, new Bangladeshi military leaders began to promote private industry and turned their attention to developing new industrial capacity and rehabilitating the economy. The socialist economic model adopted by early leaders had resulted in inefficiency and economic stagnation. Beginning in late 1975, the government gradually gave greater scope to private sector participation in the economy, a pattern that has continued since then.

After Lt. Gen. Ziaur Rahman's ascension to the power in 1975, new strategy was taken to encourage private enterprise with a primary goal of maximization of GNP growth rate. Zia's government revised the First Five-Year Plan (1973–1978) taken by the Mujib government and formulated a "Three year hard core plan" for remaining three years. This was followed by the Two-Year Plan (1978–80) and the Second Five Year Plan (1980–85). The government also established special economic zones called Export Processing Zones (EPZs) to attract investors and promote export industries. These zones have played a key role in Bangladesh's export economy. The government also de-nationalized and privatized state-owned industries by either returning them to their original owners or selling them to private buyers. Meanwhile, inefficiency in the public sector gradually increased; and left-wing opposition grew against the export of natural gas.

The 1980s saw the emergence of dynamic local brands like PRAN. Muhammad Yunus began experimenting with microcredit in the late 1970s. In 1983, the Grameen Bank was established. Bangladesh became the pioneer of the modern microcredit industry, with leading players like Grameen Bank, BRAC and Proshika. In the industrial sector, two policy innovations in the mid-1980s helped exporters. The reforms introduced the back-to-back letter of credit and duty-drawback facilities through bonded warehouses. These reforms removed major constraints for the country's fledgling garment industry. The reforms allowed a garment manufacturer to obtain letters of credit from domestic banks to finance its import of inputs, by showing letters of credit from foreign buyers of garments. The reforms also reimbursed manufacturers the duty paid on imported inputs on proof that the inputs, stored in bonded warehouses, had been used to manufacture the exports. These reforms spurred the growth of industry into the world's second largest textile exporting sector.

In the mid-1980s, there were encouraging signs of progress. Economic policies aimed at encouraging private enterprise and investment, privatising public industries, reinstating budgetary discipline, and liberalising the import regime were accelerated. The International Finance Investment and Commerce Bank was set up as a multinational bank for Bangladesh, Nepal and the Maldives.

==== Economic growth (1991–2022) ====
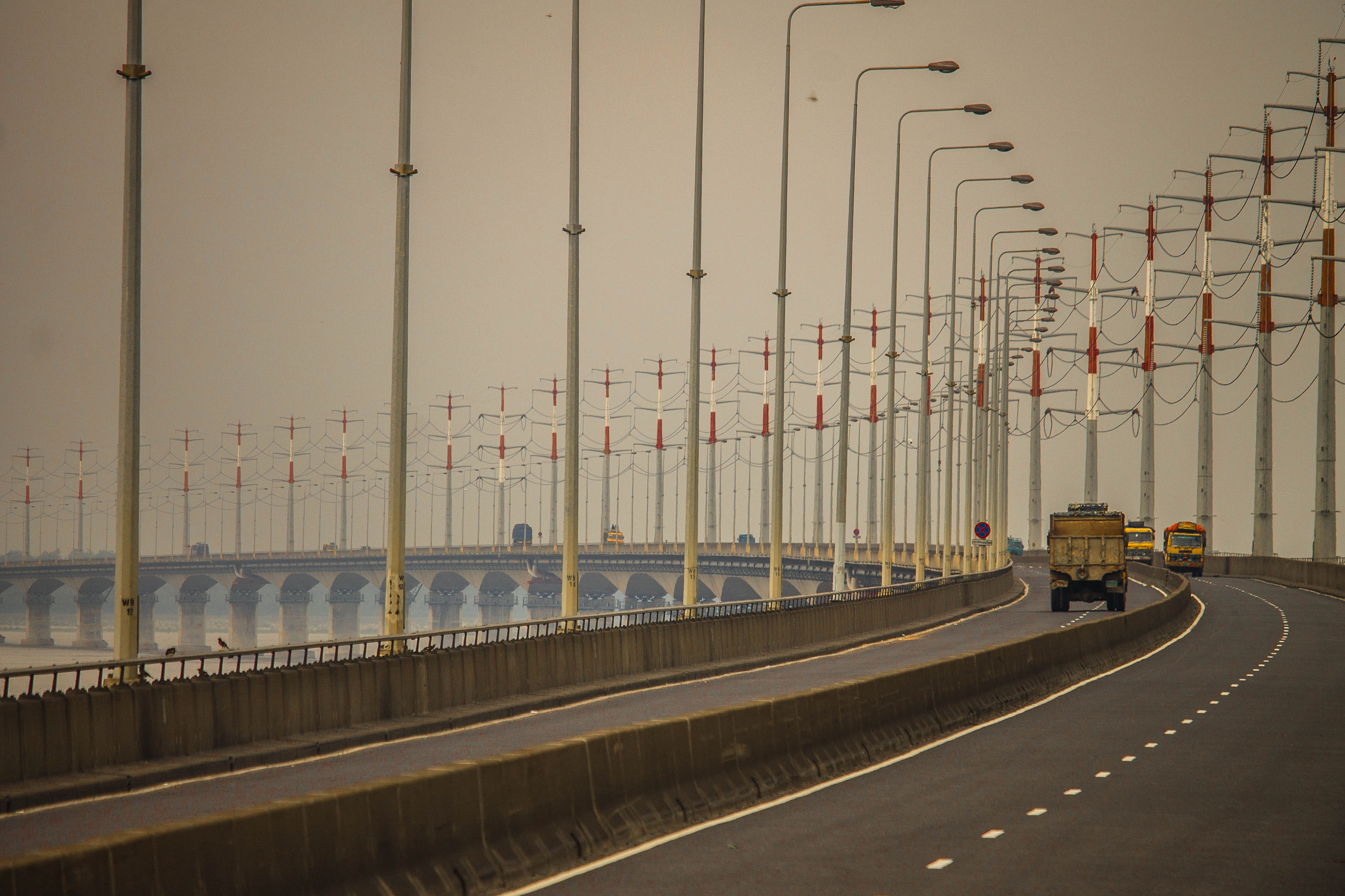
Jamuna Bridge opened in 1998. Between 1988 and 1998, Bangladesh expanded its rural road network from 3000 km to 15,500 km.

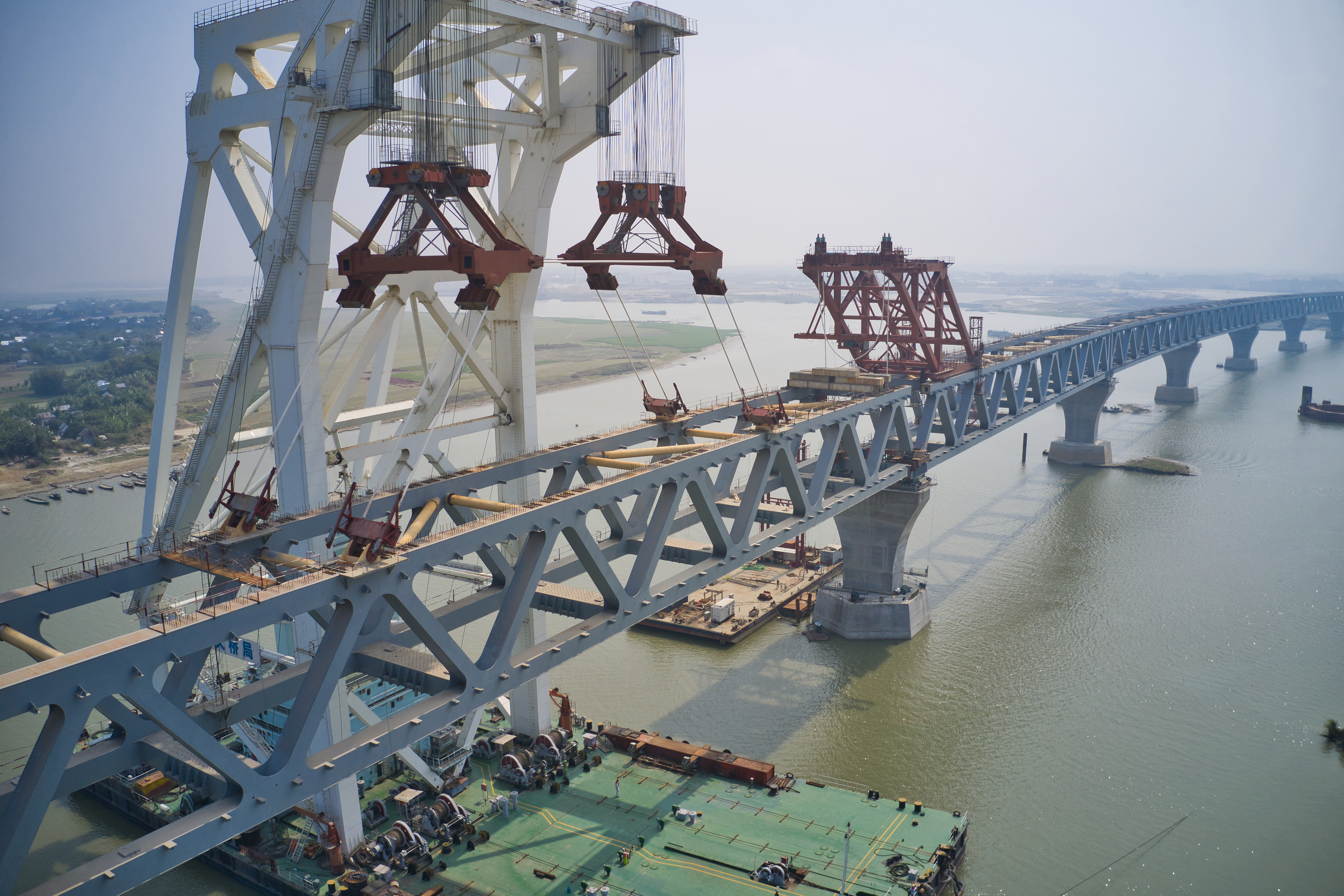
Construction of Padma Bridge, which opened in 2022

From 1991 to 1993, the government engaged in an enhanced structural adjustment facility (ESAF) with the International Monetary Fund (IMF). A series of economic liberalization measures was introduced by finance minister Saifur Rahman, including opening up sectors like telecom to foreign investment. The Chittagong Stock Exchange was also set up. The 1990s was a boon for the private sector. Banking, telecommunications, aviation and tertiary education saw new private players and increased competition. The pharmaceutical industry in Bangladesh grew to meet 98% of domestic demand. The ceramics industry in Bangladesh developed to meet local demand for 96% of tableware ceramics, 77% of tiles and 89% of sanitary ceramics. The Chittagong-based steel industry in Bangladesh exploited scrap steel from ship-breaking yards and started contributing to shipbuilding in Bangladesh.

But the government failed to sustain reforms in large part because of preoccupation with the government's domestic political troubles, including tensions between the Awami League, the Bangladesh Nationalist Party (BNP) and Jatiya Party. Frequent hartals and strikes disrupted the economy. In the late 1990s the government's economic policies became more entrenched, and some gains were lost, which was highlighted by a precipitous drop in foreign direct investment in 2000 and 2001. Many new private commercial banks were given licenses to operate.

Between 2001 and 2006, annual GDP growth touched an average of 5-6%. In June 2003 the IMF approved 3-year, $490-million plan as part of the Poverty Reduction and Growth Facility (PRGF) for Bangladesh that aimed to support the government's economic reform programme up to 2006. Seventy million dollars was made available immediately. In the same vein the World Bank approved $536 million in interest-free loans. The economy saw continuous real GDP growth of at least 6% since 2009. Bangladesh emerged as one of the fastest growing economies.

According to economist Syed Akhtar Mahmood, the Bangladeshi government is often seen as the villain in the country's economic story. But government has played an important role in stimulating the economy through building infrastructure, liberalizing regulations, and promoting high yielding crops in agriculture. According to Mahmood, "[m]ost roads linking the villages with one another, and with the cities, were not paved and not accessible throughout the year. This situation was remarkably transformed within a span of 10 years, from 1988 to 1997, with the construction of the so-called feeder roads. In 1988, Bangladesh had about 3,000 kilometers of feeder roads. By 1997, this network expanded to 15,500 kilometers. These "last-mile" all-weather roads helped connect the villages of Bangladesh to the rest of the country".

As a result of export-led growth, Bangladesh has enjoyed a trade surplus in recent years. Bangladesh historically has run a large trade deficit, financed largely through aid receipts and remittances from workers overseas. Foreign reserves dropped markedly in 2001 but stabilised in the US$3 to US$4 billion range (or about 3 months' import cover). In January 2007, reserves stood at $3.74 billion, and then increased to $5.8 billion by January 2008, in November 2009 it surpassed $10.0 billion, and as of April 2011 it surpassed the US$12 billion according to the Bank of Bangladesh, the central bank. The dependence on foreign aid and imports has also decreased gradually since the early 1990s. Foreign aid now accounts for only 2% of GDP.

In the last decade, poverty dropped by around one third with significant improvements in the human development index, literacy, life expectancy and per capita food consumption. With the economy growing annually at an average rate of 6% over a prolonged period, more than 15 million people have moved out of poverty since 1992. The poverty rate went down from 80% in 1971 to 44.2% in 1991 to 12.9% in 2021. In recent years, Bangladesh has focused on promoting regional trade and transport links. The Bangladesh Bhutan India Nepal Motor Vehicles Agreement seeks to create hassle free road transport across international borders. Bangladesh also signed a coastal shipping agreement with India. While prioritizing food security in the domestic market, Bangladesh exports more than US$1 billion worth of processed food products. As the result of a robust agricultural supply chain, supermarkets have sprung up in cities and towns across the country.

Bangladesh became the second largest textile exporter in the world. An estimated 4.4 million workers are employed in the garments industry, with the majority being women. The sector contributes 11% of Bangladesh's GDP. The 2013 Rana Plaza factory collapse caused global concern on industrial safety in Bangladesh, leading to the formation of the Accord on Fire and Building Safety in Bangladesh and the Alliance for Bangladesh Worker Safety. The local clothing industry has seen fiercely competitive brands vying for the market, including Aarong, Westecs, Ecstasy, and Yellow among many others.

The World Bank notes the economic progress of the country by stating that "[w]hen the newly independent country of Bangladesh was born on December 16, 1971, it was the second poorest country in the world—making the country's transformation over the next 50 years one of the great development stories. Since then, poverty has been cut in half at record speed. Enrolment in primary school is now nearly universal. Hundreds of thousands of women have entered the workforce. Steady progress has been made on maternal and child health. And the country is better buttressed against the destructive forces posed by climate change and natural disasters. Bangladesh's success comprises many moving parts—from investing in human capital to establishing macroeconomic stability. Building on this success, the country is now setting the stage for further economic growth and job creation by ramping up investments in energy, inland connectivity, urban projects, and transport infrastructure, as well as prioritizing climate change adaptation and disaster preparedness on its path toward sustainable growth".

As of 2022, Bangladesh had the second largest foreign-exchange reserves in South Asia. In 2021, Bangladesh surpassed both India and Pakistan in terms of per capita income. The country achieved 100% electricity coverage for households in 2022. Megaprojects like the Padma Bridge, Dhaka Metro, Matarbari Port, and Karnaphuli Tunnel have been planned to stimulate economic activity. The completion of Padma Bridge was expected to boost Bangladeshi GDP by 1.23%.

==== Economic depression (2022–present) ====
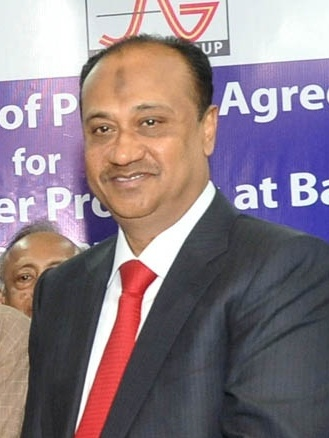
Mohammed Saiful Alam Masud, chairman of S. Alam Group of Industries, has been accused of siphoning off foreign currency worth $234 billion from various banks in Bangladesh.

Following the Russian invasion of Ukraine, Bangladesh experienced pressure on its foreign exchange reserves due to rising import costs; this affected the country's electricity sector which relies on imported fuel; rising import prices also contributed to inflation. The International Monetary Fund (IMF) had forecasted Consumer Price Index (CPI) in Bangladesh to rise to 5.9% by the year 2022. According to the Bangladesh Bureau of Statistics, general inflation climbed to 6.17% by February 2022.

Due to the mass uprising of July–August 2024, Bangladeshi economy witnessed a huge loss, suffering losses of over $1.2 billion as a result of the nationwide curfew and protests. It also resulted in a sudden sharp rise in inflation in July 2024; after momentary stabilization, inflation once again begun to increase. By September 2025, The general inflation rate in Bangladesh reached 10.87%, up from 9.92%. By 2026, Bangladeshi taka lost 43% of its value against the US dollar since 2021. Bangladesh had the highest consumer price in South Asia this year per Asian Development Bank's projection.

In November 2024, the International Crisis Group (ICG) said "early signs suggest that policymakers can avoid a Sri Lanka-style economic crash" and added exchange rate reforms helped improve foreign reserves while inflation had declined from its peak, although it warned that "serious economic risks remain". The crisis group also said that long-term economic reform was "far longer" than the interim government's "likely lifespan", stating that the government was focused on "short-term macro-economic priorities" such as inflation, foreign reserves and economic stability.

In January 2025, economist and Bangladesh's incumbent chief adviser, Muhammad Yunus, labelled the country's high economic growth under Sheikh Hasina's premiership as "fake". A committee of experts appointed by Yunus' interim government subsequently released a white paper which stated there was "strong evidence" that the Hasina government had overstated GDP growth and understated inflation, citing large inaccuracies in macroeconomic imbalances. The report estimated that Bangladesh's actual pre-pandemic GDP growth rate was around 3%, compared with the 7% officially reported by the Bangladesh Bureau of Statistics (BBS), implying that the country's current GDP may be roughly one-third smaller than the official BBS figure.

In April 2025, the Trump administration imposed 37% "reciprocal" tariffs on Bangladesh, which is second highest in South Asia just after Sri Lanka (44%). New York Times described it a major blow particularly for the garments industry of Bangladesh. France24 reported that many US buyers started to halt orders in Bangladesh saying that it was too costly to bear the import tariffs for them. It was later lowered to 20% on 1 August.

== Macro-economic trend ==
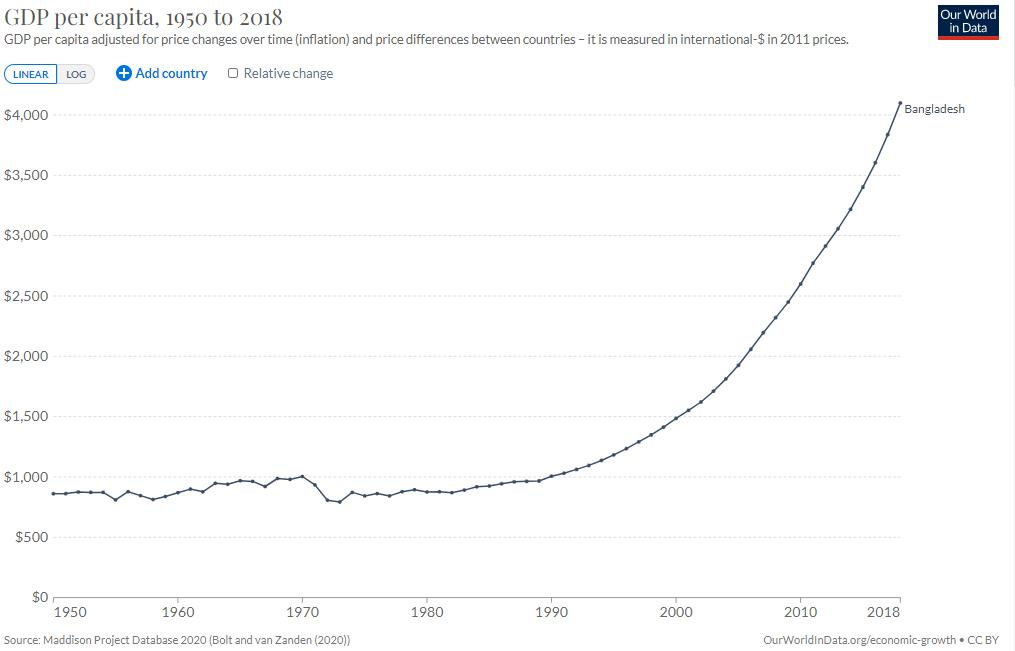
GDP per capita development since 1950

This is a chart of trend of gross domestic product of Bangladesh at market prices estimated by the International Monetary Fund with figures in millions of Bangladeshi Taka. However, this reflects only the formal sector of the economy.

| Year | Gross Domestic Product (Million Taka) | US Dollar Exchange | Inflation index (2000=100) | Per capita income (as % of USA) |
|---|---|---|---|---|
| 1980 | 250,300 | 16.10 Taka | 20 | 1.79 |
| 1985 | 597,318 | 31.00 Taka | 36 | 1.19 |
| 1990 | 1,054,234 | 35.79 Taka | 58 | 1.16 |
| 1995 | 1,594,210 | 40.27 Taka | 78 | 1.12 |
| 2000 | 2,453,160 | 52.14 Taka | 100 | 0.97 |
| 2005 | 3,913,334 | 63.92 Taka | 126 | 0.95 |
| 2008 | 5,003,438 | 68.65 Taka | 147 | |
| 2015 | 17,295,665 | 78.15 Taka | 196 | 2.48 |
| 2019 | 26,604,164 | 84.55 Taka | | 2.91 |

Mean wages were $0.58 per man-hour in 2009.

=== GDP per capita (nominal) ===
Historical evolution of GDP per capita (Nominal) of Bangladesh in U.S. dollars during the period 1980-2030
(According to the International Monetary Fund)

Source: International Monetary Fund (IMF), updated as of April 2026

Historical evolution of GDP per capita (Nominal) of Bangladesh in U.S. dollars during the period 1980-2030
(According to the World Bank)

Source: World Bank Group (WBG), updated as of July 2026

=== GDP per capita (PPP) ===
Historical evolution of GDP per capita (PPP) of Bangladesh during the period 1980-2030

Source: International Monetary Fund (IMF)

The following table shows the main economic indicators in 1980–2021 (with IMF staff estimates in 2022–2027). Inflation below 5% is in green. The annual unemployment rate is extracted from the World Bank, although the International Monetary Fund find them unreliable.

| Year | GDP (in Bil. US$PPP) | GDP per capita (in US$ PPP) | GDP (in Bil. US$nominal) | GDP per capita (in US$ nominal) | GDP growth (real) | Inflation rate (in Percent) | Unemployment (in Percent) | Government debt (in % of GDP) |
|---|---|---|---|---|---|---|---|---|
| 1980 | 40.7 | 511.2 | 22.6 | 283.3 | ▲3.1% | ▲7.7% | n/a | n/a |
| 1981 | ▲47.1 | ▲575.4 | ▼22.4 | ▼273.4 | ▲4.3% | ▲14.9% | n/a | n/a |
| 1982 | ▲51.6 | ▲614.3 | ▼20.9 | ▼249.4 | ▲2.4% | ▲13.7% | n/a | n/a |
| 1983 | ▲56.1 | ▲650.7 | ▼20.3 | ▼235.4 | ▲4.0% | ▲11.1% | n/a | n/a |
| 1984 | ▲60.5 | ▲684.3 | ▲22.7 | ▲257.2 | ▲5.2% | ▲10.0% | n/a | n/a |
| 1985 | ▲64.8 | ▲713.4 | ▲24.4 | ▲269.3 | ▲3.2% | ▲10.4% | n/a | n/a |
| 1986 | ▲68.7 | ▲737.1 | ▲25.1 | ▲269.8 | ▲4.2% | ▲10.3% | n/a | n/a |
| 1987 | ▲72.4 | ▲757.3 | ▲27.5 | ▲287.7 | ▲3.7% | ▲10.5% | n/a | n/a |
| 1988 | ▲76.8 | ▲782.1 | ▲29.6 | ▲301.6 | ▲2.2% | ▲10.2% | n/a | n/a |
| 1989 | ▲83.2 | ▲826.6 | ▲32.3 | ▲320.7 | ▲2.6% | ▲9.2% | n/a | n/a |
| 1990 | ▲90.3 | ▲875.5 | ▲34.8 | ▲337.6 | ▲5.9% | ▲9.7% | n/a | n/a |
| 1991 | ▲97.3 | ▲921.5 | ▲36.0 | ▲341.3 | ▲3.3% | ▲9.3% | ▼2.2% | n/a |
| 1992 | ▲104.3 | ▲965.9 | ▲36.7 | ▼340.0 | ▲5.0% | ▲5.9% | ▲2.3% | n/a |
| 1993 | ▲111.4 | ▲1,009.4 | ▲37.1 | ▼335.8 | ▲4.6% | ▲3.3% | ▲2.4% | n/a |
| 1994 | ▲118.9 | ▲1,054.7 | ▲39.4 | ▲349.4 | ▲4.1% | ▲4.6% | 2.4% | n/a |
| 1995 | ▲127.2 | ▲1,104.3 | ▲44.0 | ▲381.8 | ▲4.9% | ▲8.2% | ▲2.5% | n/a |
| 1996 | ▲136.0 | ▲1,156.0 | ▲47.0 | ▲399.7 | ▲4.6% | ▲6.1% | 2.5% | n/a |
| 1997 | ▲145.7 | ▲1,212.5 | ▲48.9 | ▲407.2 | ▲5.4% | ▲3.7% | ▲2.7% | n/a |
| 1998 | ▲154.8 | ▲1,261.5 | ▲51.2 | ▲417.0 | ▲5.2% | ▲6.8% | ▲2.9% | n/a |
| 1999 | ▲165.5 | ▲1,321.6 | ▲53.1 | ▲424.2 | ▲4.9% | ▲7.4% | ▲3.1% | n/a |
| 2000 | ▲178.7 | ▲1,399.6 | ▲54.3 | ▲425.7 | ▲5.9% | ▲4.3% | ▲3.3% | n/a |
| 2001 | ▲191.5 | ▲1,472.3 | ▲54.5 | ▼419.0 | ▲5.3% | ▲2.2% | ▲3.6% | n/a |
| 2002 | ▲203.9 | ▲1,539.4 | ▲55.8 | ▲420.9 | ▲4.4% | ▲2.8% | ▲3.9% | n/a |
| 2003 | ▲220.0 | ▲1,632.0 | ▲60.1 | ▲445.9 | ▲5.3% | ▲4.6% | ▲4.3% | 44.3% |
| 2004 | ▲239.7 | ▲1,749.7 | ▲65.7 | ▲479.4 | ▲6.3% | ▲5.7% | 4.3% | ▼43.5% |
| 2005 | ▲262.8 | ▲1,890.0 | ▲69.5 | ▲499.6 | ▲6.0% | ▲10.2% | 4.3% | ▼42.3% |
| 2006 | ▲289.4 | ▲2,053.9 | ▲71.8 | ▲509.6 | ▲6.6% | ▲6.8% | ▼3.6% | ▲42.3% |
| 2007 | ▲316.6 | ▲2,219.5 | ▲79.6 | ▲558.1 | ▲7.1% | ▲9.1% | ▲4.1% | ▼41.9% |
| 2008 | ▲340.5 | ▲2,359.7 | ▲91.6 | ▲635.0 | ▲6.0% | ▲8.9% | ▲4.6% | ▼40.6% |
| 2009 | ▲360.9 | ▲2,473.2 | ▲102.5 | ▲702.3 | ▲5.0% | ▲7.6% | ▲5.0% | ▼39.5% |
| 2010 | ▲387.3 | ▲2,624.2 | ▲115.3 | ▲781.2 | ▲5.6% | ▲6.8% | ▼3.4% | ▼35.5% |
| 2011 | ▲421.0 | ▲2,820.2 | ▲128.6 | ▲861.8 | ▲6.5% | ▲10.9% | ▲3.8% | ▲36.6% |
| 2012 | ▲473.8 | ▲3,137.6 | ▲133.4 | ▲883.1 | ▲6.5% | ▲8.9% | ▲4.1% | ▼36.2% |
| 2013 | ▲509.2 | ▲3,333.3 | ▲150.0 | ▲981.8 | ▲6.0% | ▲6.8% | ▲4.4% | ▼35.8% |
| 2014 | ▲553.8 | ▲3,583.7 | ▲172.9 | ▲1,118.9 | ▲6.1% | ▲7.3% | ▼4.4% | ▼35.3% |
| 2015 | ▲595.3 | ▲3,810.1 | ▲195.1 | ▲1,248.5 | ▲6.6% | ▲6.4% | 4.4% | ▼33.7% |
| 2016 | ▲650.7 | ▲4,118.9 | ▲265.4 | ▲1,466.6 | ▲7.1% | ▲5.9% | ▼4.3% | ▼33.3% |
| 2017 | ▲710.6 | ▲4,450.3 | ▲293.7 | ▲1,610.9 | ▲7.3% | ▲5.4% | ▲4.4% | ▲33.4% |
| 2018 | ▲835.9 | ▲5,370.4 | ▲321.0 | ▲1,858.4 | ▲7.9% | ▲5.8% | 4.4% | ▲34.6% |
| 2019 | ▲989.0 | ▲6,429.6 | ▲353.6 | ▲1,955.7 | ▲8.2% | ▲5.5% | 4.4% | ▲36.1% |
| 2020 | ▲1,050.8 | ▲6,950.5 | ▲373.1 | ▲2,227.5 | ▲3.5% | ▲5.6% | ▲5.4% | ▲39.5% |
| 2021 | ▲1,170.1 | ▲7,509.6 | ▲416.1 | ▲2,500.7 | ▲5.0% | ▲5.6% | ▼5.2% | ▲41.4% |
| 2022 | ▲1,348.6 | ▲7,923.1 | ▲460.7 | ▲2,782.0 | ▲6.4% | ▲6.0% | n/a | ▲42.6% |
| 2023 | ▲1,496.2 | ▲8,636.9 | ▲510.4 | ▲2,987.7 | ▲6.7% | ▲6.2% | n/a | ▲42.8% |
| 2024 | ▲1,647.1 | ▲9,450.4 | ▲565.0 | ▲3,213.9 | ▲7.2% | ▲5.7% | n/a | ▼42.7% |
| 2025 | ▲1,872.9 | ▲10,143.7 | ▲625.8 | ▲3,455.9 | ▲7.2% | ▲5.5% | n/a | ▼42.3% |
| 2026 | ▲1,947.0 | ▲10,845.5 | ▲685.1 | ▲3,714.7 | ▲7.1% | ▲5.5% | n/a | ▼42.1% |
| 2027 | ▲2,102.0 | ▲11,851.0 | ▲750.4 | ▲4,287.2 | ▲6.9% | ▲5.5% | n/a | ▼41.9% |

== Economic sectors ==
The Bangladesh Bureau of Statistics divides the country's economy into 19 broad categories. Their contributions to gross domestic product (GDP) for 2023-24 are:

Sectoral Shares of gross domestic product (GDP) of Bangladesh
| Sector | % of GDP |
|---|---|
| A) Agriculture | 11.55 |
| Agriculture, forestry and fishing | 11.55 |
| B) Industry | 35.27 |
| Mining and quarrying | 1.53 |
| Manufacturing | 22.65 |
| Electricity, gas, steam and air conditioning | 1.23 |
| Water supply, sewerage, waste management | 0.10 |
| Construction | 9.77 |
| C) Services | 53.18 |
| Wholesale and retail trade; repair | 15.10 |
| Transportation and storage | 7.43 |
| Accommodation and food service activities | 1.23 |
| Information and communication | 1.04 |
| Financial and insurance activities | 3.32 |
| Real estate activities | 8.48 |
| Professional, scientific, and technical activities | 0.20 |
| Administrative and support service activities | 0.92 |
| Public administration and defence | 3.34 |
| Education | 3.04 |
| Human health and social works activities | 3.85 |
| Arts, entertainment and recreation | 0.16 |
| Other service activities | 5.07 |

=== Agriculture, fishing, animal husbandry and forestry ===
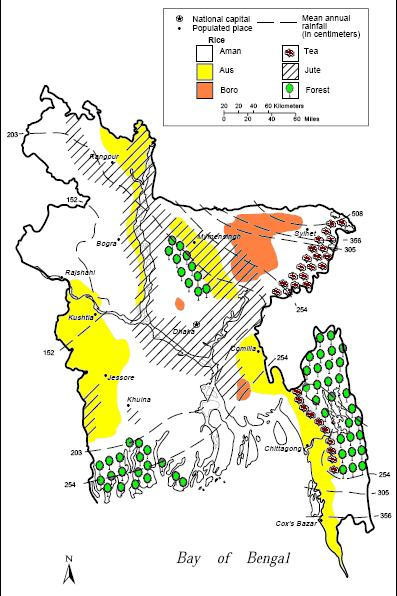
The growing areas of major agricultural products

Development of agricultural output of Bangladesh in 2019 US$ since 1961

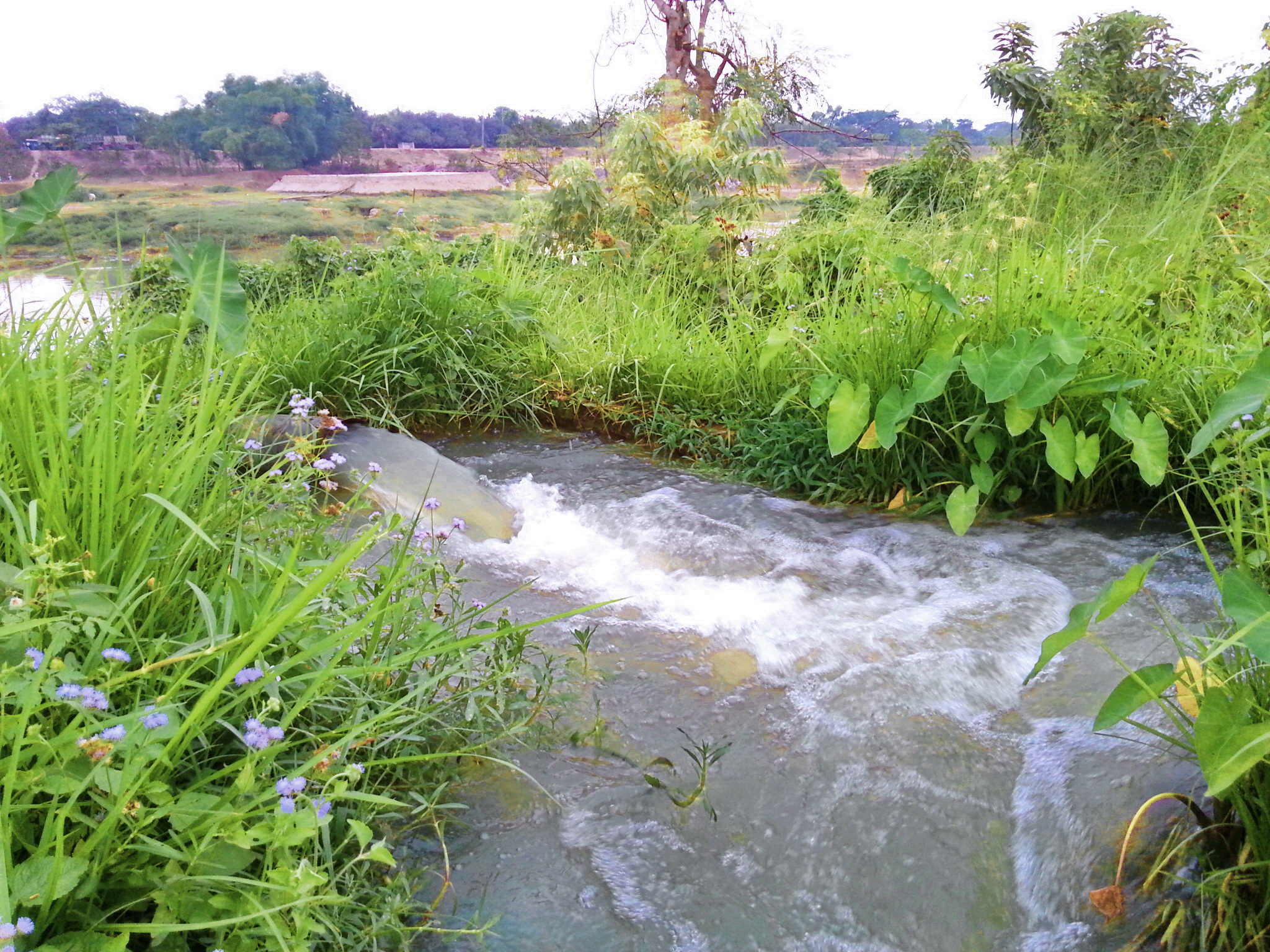
As watercourses such as canals, both natural and manmade, and rivers contribute as the vital source of irrigation, their spread across the country is attributed as a key factor for the economic and geographic extent of agriculture in Bangladesh. Photographed is a process of irrigation underway in Comilla, enabled by a pump that is extracting water from the Gumti seen in the background.

Agriculture is the largest employment sector in Bangladesh, making up 14.2 percent of Bangladesh's GDP in 2017 and employing about 42.7 percent of the workforce. As of the financial year 2022 to 2023, the agricultural sector contributed to more than 12% of GDP. The performance of this sector has an overwhelming impact on major macroeconomic objectives like employment generation, poverty alleviation, human resources development, food security, and other economic and social forces. A plurality of Bangladeshis earn their living from agriculture. Due to a number of factors, Bangladesh's labour-intensive agriculture has achieved steady increases in food grain production despite the often unfavorable weather conditions. These include better flood control and irrigation, a generally more efficient use of fertilisers, as well as the establishment of better distribution and rural credit networks.

Although rice and jute are the primary crops, maize and vegetables are assuming greater importance. Due to the expansion of irrigation networks, some wheat producers have switched to cultivation of maize which is used mostly as poultry feed. Tea is grown in the northeast. There are 166 tea estates in Bangladesh, covering almost 280,000 acres of land. Bangladesh is the 9th largest Tea producer, producing around 2% of the world’s Tea production. Because of Bangladesh's fertile soil and normally ample water supply, rice can be grown and harvested three times a year in many areas. The country is among the top producers of rice (third), potatoes (seventh), tropical fruits (sixth), jute (second), and farmed fish (fifth). With 35.8 million metric tons produced in 2000, rice is Bangladesh's principal crop. As of 2024, it is expected that rice production in Bangladesh will exceed 37.7 million metric tons, an increase of nearly 700000 tons from last year. Bangladesh produces almost 5 metric tons of rice per hectare, making the country self sufficient in rice production. In comparison to rice, wheat output in 1999 was 1.9 million tonnes (1,900,000 long tons; 2,100,000 short tons).

Population pressure continues to place a severe burden on productive capacity, sometimes creating a food deficit, especially of wheat. Foreign assistance and commercial imports fill the gap. Underemployment remains a serious problem, and a growing concern for Bangladesh's agricultural sector will be its ability to absorb additional manpower. Finding alternative sources of employment will continue to be a daunting problem for future governments, particularly with the increasing numbers of landless peasants who already account for about half the rural labour force. Other challenges facing the sector include environmental issues: insecticides, water management challenges, pollution, and land degradation all effect the agricultural system in Bangladesh. Bangladesh is particularly vulnerable to climate change, with extreme weather and temperature changes significantly changing the conditions for growing food. Adaptation of the agricultural sector is a major concern for policy addressing climate change in Bangladesh.

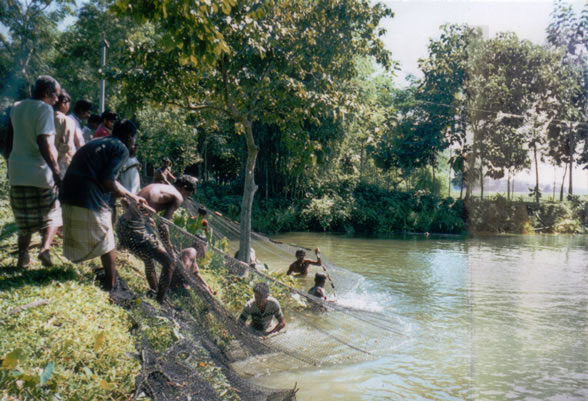
Villagers fishing in Sylhet, Bangladesh

Bangladesh being a first line littoral state of the Indian Ocean has many marine resources in the Bay of Bengal. The country has an exclusive economic zone of 41,000 square miles (110,000 km^{2}) which totals 73% of the country's land area. In the past, people of Bangladesh were mostly dependent upon land-based proteins. But continuous process of industrialization and urbanization consumed the limited land area, leading the vast under water protein available from the Bay of Bengal, the only way to meet Bangladesh's nutritional needs.

Fish provides about 60 percent of the animal protein in the Bangladeshi diet. According to the Bangladesh Department of Fisheries, aquaculture contributed about 2.53 percent of the country's national GDP and roughly 22 percent of its agricultural GDP in the 2023–24 fiscal year. Total fish production reached about 5.02 million tonnes that year, of which aquaculture supplied roughly 59 percent (about 2.98 million tonnes) and the remainder came from inland capture and marine fisheries.

=== Manufacturing and industry ===
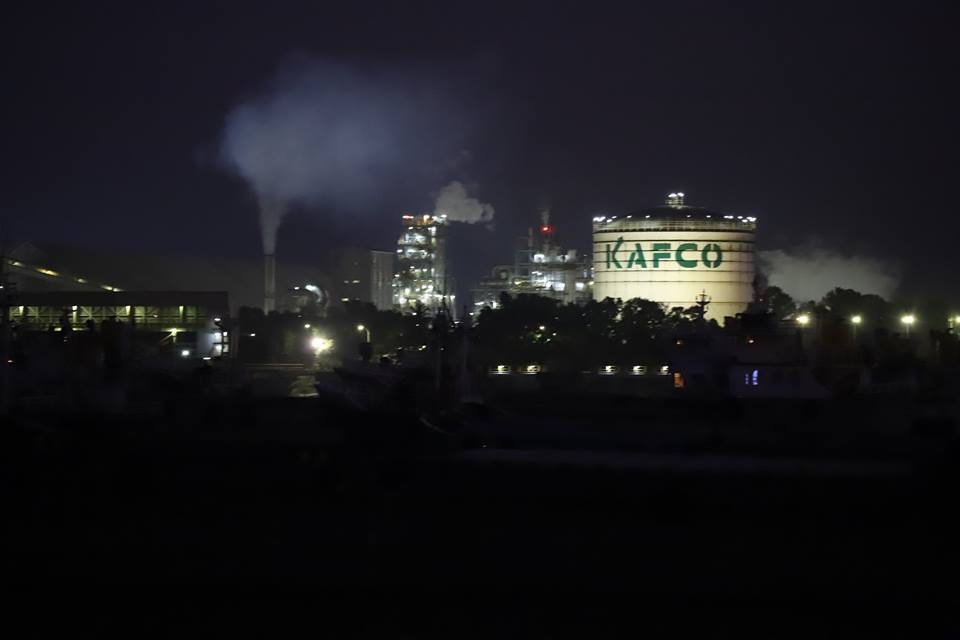
KAFCO plant in Chittagong

Many new jobs – mostly for women – have been created by the country's dynamic private ready-made garment industry, which grew at double-digit rates through most of the 1990s. By the late 1990s, about 1.5 million people, mostly women, were employed in the garments sector as well as Leather products specially Footwear (Shoe manufacturing unit). During 2001–2002, export earnings from ready-made garments reached $3,125 million, representing 52% of Bangladesh's total exports. Bangladesh has overtaken India in apparel exports in 2009, its exports stood at 2.66 billion US dollar, ahead of India's 2.27 billion US dollar and in 2014 the export rose to $3.12 billion every month. At the fiscal year 2018, Bangladesh has been able to garner US$36.67 billion export earnings by exporting manufactured goods, of which, 83.49 percent has come from the apparel manufacturing sector.

Eastern Bengal was known for its fine muslin and silk fabric before the British period. The dyes, yarn, and cloth were the envy of much of the premodern world. Bengali muslin, silk, and brocade were worn by the aristocracy of Asia and Europe. The introduction of machine-made textiles from England in the late eighteenth century spelled doom for the costly and time-consuming hand loom process. Cotton growing died out in East Bengal, and the textile industry became dependent on imported yarn. Those who had earned their living in the textile industry were forced to rely more completely on farming. Only the smallest vestiges of a once-thriving cottage industry survived.

Other industries which have shown very strong growth include the pharmaceutical industry, shipbuilding industry, information technology, leather industry, steel industry, and light engineering industry.

==== Pharmaceutical ====
Bangladesh has a robust pharmaceutical industry. As of 27 April 2024, Bangladesh is the only nation among the 48 least-developed countries that is almost self-sufficient when it comes to medicine production as local companies meet 98 percent of the demand while 213 pharmaceutical companies are operating in Bangladesh and the industry clocks an average annual growth rate of 12 percent. Nine drug manufacturers have received approvals from regulators in the United States, the European Union, and Australia as well as from the World Health Organisation. The sector ships products to around 150 countries.

==== Textile and leather ====
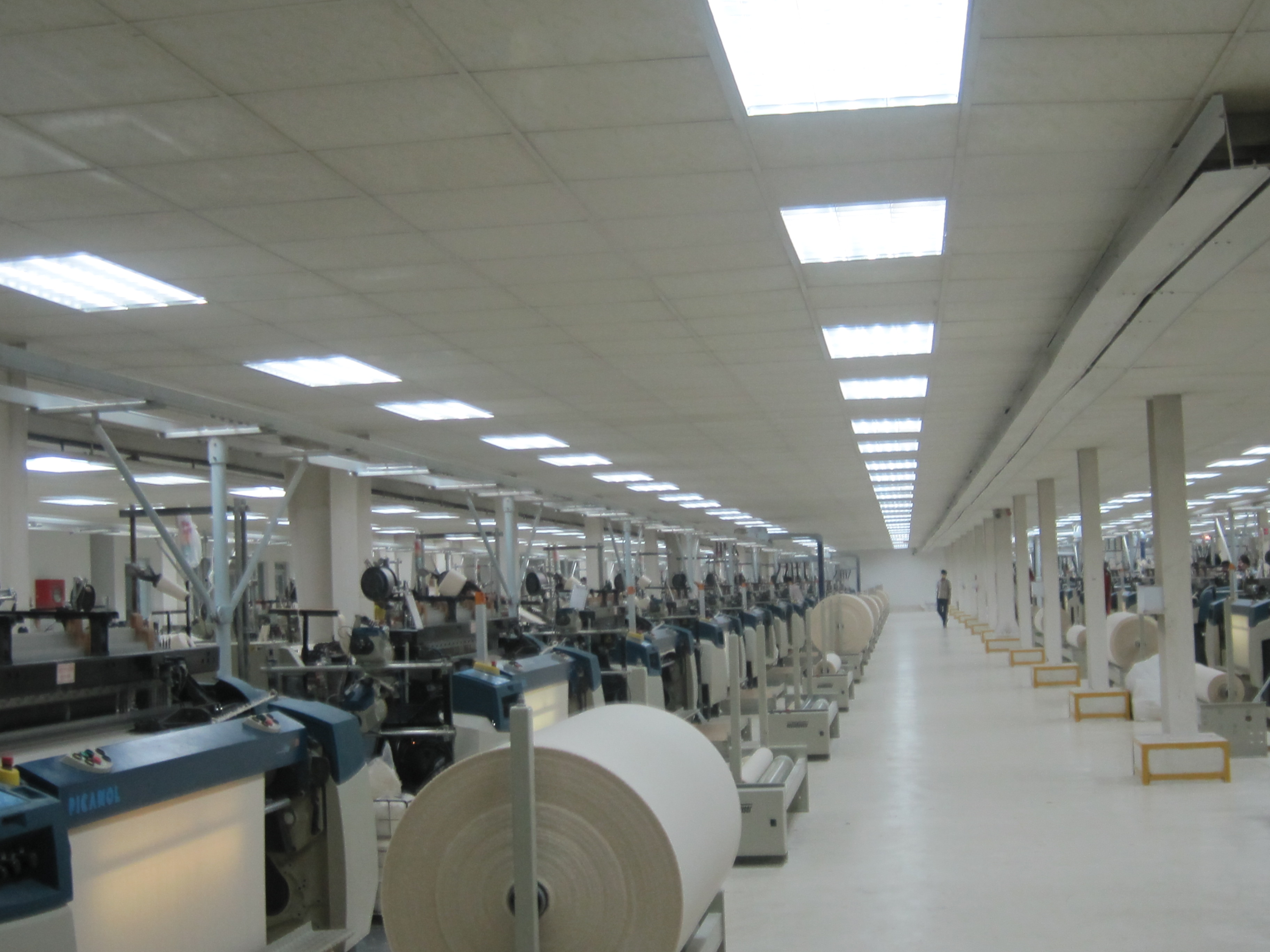
A Bangladeshi textile fabric plant

Bangladesh's textile industry, which includes knitwear and ready-made garments (RMG) along with specialised textile products, is the nation's number one export earner, accounting for $21.5 billion in 2013 – 80% of Bangladesh's total exports of $27 billion.

Bangladesh is 2nd in world textile exports, behind China, which exported $120.1 billion worth of textiles in 2009. The industry employs nearly 3.5 million workers. Current exports have doubled since 2004. Wages in Bangladesh's textile industry were the lowest in the world as of 2010. The country was considered the most formidable rival to China where wages were rapidly rising and currency was appreciating. As of 2012 wages remained low for the 3 million people employed in the industry, but labour unrest was increasing despite vigorous government action to enforce labour peace. Owners of textile firms and their political allies were a powerful political influence in Bangladesh.

The urban garment industry has created more than one million formal sector jobs for women, contributing to the high female labour participation in Bangladesh. While it can be argued that women working in the garment industry are subjected to unsafe labour conditions and low wages, Dina M. Siddiqi argues that even though conditions in Bangladesh garment factories "are by no means ideal," they still give women in Bangladesh the opportunity to earn their own wages. As evidence she points to the fear created by the passage of the 1993 Harkins Bill (Child Labor Deterrence Bill), which caused factory owners to dismiss "an estimated 50,000 children, many of whom helped support their families, forcing them into a completely unregulated informal sector, in lower-paying and much less secure occupations such as brick-breaking, domestic service and rickshaw pulling."

Even though the working conditions in garment factories are not ideal, they tend to financially be more reliable than other occupations and, "enhance women's economic capabilities to spend, save and invest their incomes." Both married and unmarried women send money back to their families as remittances, but these earned wages have more than just economic benefits. Many women in the garment industry are marrying later, have lower fertility rates, and attain higher levels of education, then women employed elsewhere.

In 2006, tens of thousands of workers mobilized in one of the country's largest strike movements, affecting almost all of the 4,000 factories. The Bangladesh Garment Manufacturers and Exporters Association (BGMEA) used police forces for crackdown. Three workers were killed, hundreds more were wounded by bullets, or imprisoned. In 2010, after a new strike movement, nearly 1,000 people were injured among workers as a result of the repression.

After massive labour unrest in 2006 the government formed a Minimum Wage Board including business and worker representatives which in 2006 set a minimum wage equivalent to 1,662.50 taka, $24 a month, up from Tk950. In 2010, following widespread labour protests involving 60,000 workers in June 2010, a controversial proposal was being considered by the Board which would raise the monthly minimum to the equivalent of $50 a month, still far below worker demands of 5,000 taka, $72, for entry level wages, but unacceptably high according to textile manufacturers who are asking for a wage below $30. On 28 July 2010 it was announced that the minimum entry level wage would be increased to 3,000 taka, about $43.

The government also seems to believe some change is necessary. On 21 September 2006 then ex-Prime Minister Khaleda Zia called on textile firms to ensure the safety of workers by complying with international labour law at a speech inaugurating the Bangladesh Apparel & Textile Exposition (BATEXPO).

Many Western multinationals use labour in Bangladesh, which is one of the cheapest in the world: 30 euros per month compared to 150 or 200 in China. Four days is enough for the CEO of one of the top five global textile brands to earn what a Bangladeshi garment worker will earn in her lifetime. In April 2013, at least 1,135 textile workers died in the collapse of their factory. Other fatal accidents due to unsanitary factories have affected Bangladesh: in 2005 a factory collapsed and caused the death of 64 people. In 2006, a series of fires killed 85 people and injured 207 others. In 2010, some 30 people died of asphyxiation and burns in two serious fires.

After the July revolution in 2024, manufacturing sector witnessed negative impact by factory closures, weak private investment, and financial difficulties despite joblessness being perceived as a key factor in shaping the uprising. Between August 2024 and July 2025, nearly 245 factories shut down, affecting around 100,000 workers. Major export-oriented industries, such as those in the garment sector, were particularly hard hit, with companies like Nassa Group and Beximco Group laying off thousands of workers due to financial and operational crises.

==== Ceramics ====
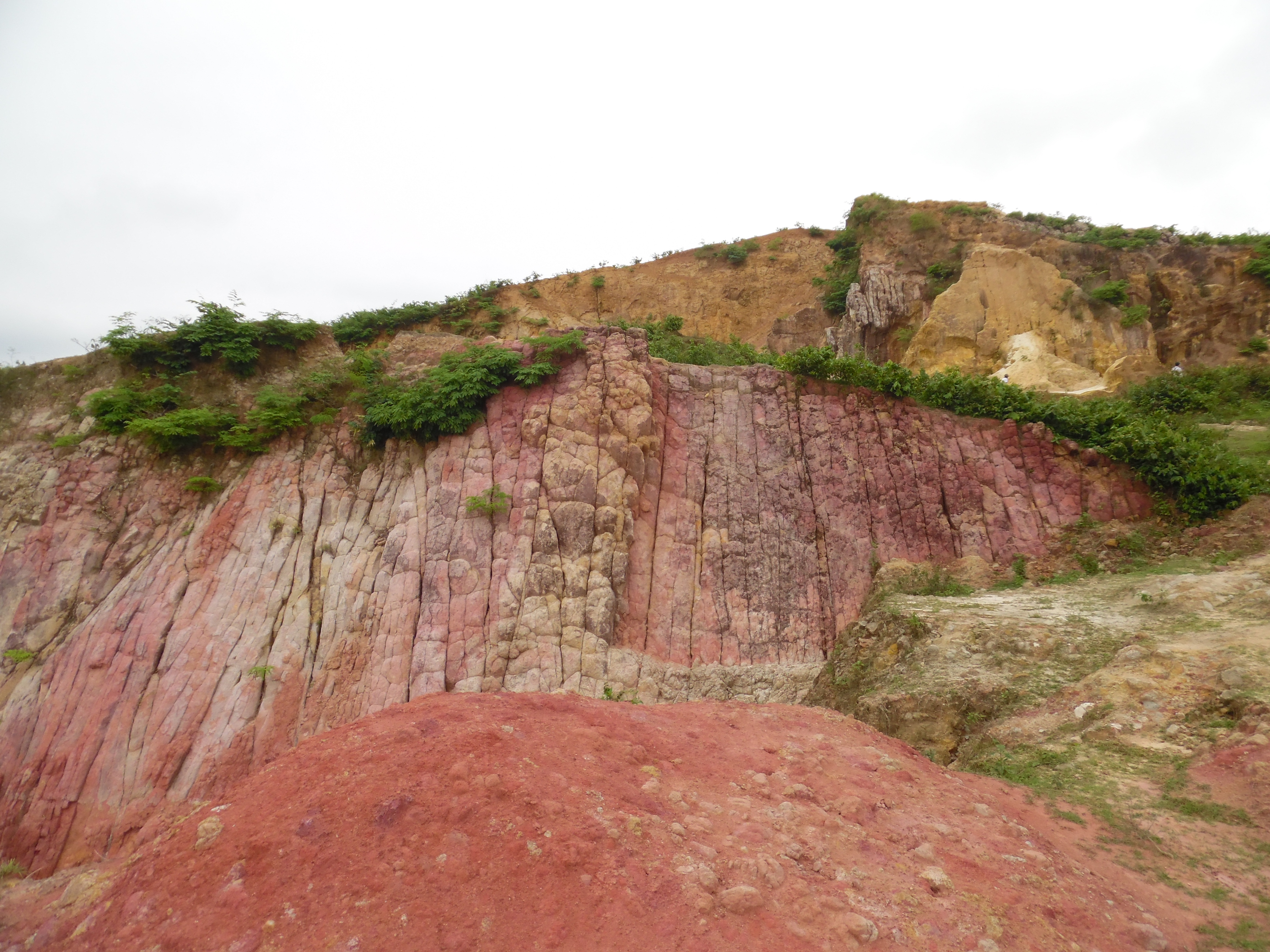
White clay mine in Bijoypur, Durgapur, Netrokona

The ceramics industry is a growing manufacturing sector in Bangladesh. The industry started in the late 1950s when the first ceramic industrial plants were established. The industry mainly produces tableware, sanitaryware and tiles. As of 2011, there were 21 ceramic industrial units throughout Bangladesh, employing about 500,000 people. In the first nine months of the 2013-14 fiscal year, Bangladesh exported about US$36 million worth of goods after meeting 80% of the domestic demand. The main export destinations are the EU, the US and the Middle East.

==== Food ====
Between 2004 and 2010, the food processing industry in Bangladesh grew at an average 7.7 percent per annum. Bangladesh Bureau of Statistics, in its 25006 Economic Census, reported that there were approximately 246 medium-sized food processing industries employing 19 percent of the industrial manufacturing workforce in Bangladesh or 8 percent of the total manufacturing labor force. The food industry employs 2.45 percent of the country's total labor force and its share in the GDP was 2.01 percent in 2010. There are also numerous small scale factories and domestic units engaged in food processing throughout the country. According to some industry analysts, the food processing sector in Bangladesh is a 4.5 billion US Dollar industry. In 2010, Bangladesh exported over $700 million worth of processed food and beverages, over 60 percent of them were shrimp and fish products.

Food processing in Bangladesh has traditionally been small scale, with domestic or family business using common processing knowledge for the conservation and handling of raw agricultural commodities to make them usable as food and feed. Although commercial scale food processing using modern technology especially for wheat and rice milling, mustard seed crushing and very limited bread and cookie manufacturing appeared during the 1960s, the growth of this sector did not gain momentum in terms of operational scale and quality until the 1980s. Recently the defining characteristics of the industry has been the processing of increasingly diverse products to meet the changing demands of the Bangladesh population. The major food processing sub-sectors in Bangladesh include dairy, edible oil, sugar, rice, wheat, fruit and vegetable, tea, poultry/beef, pulses and spices and fish processing industries. Induced by the vigorous growth of the diverse middle class population of Bangladesh and the growing demands for additional consumption, the food processing sector is set to witness further hefty expansion in the coming years.

==== Automotive ====
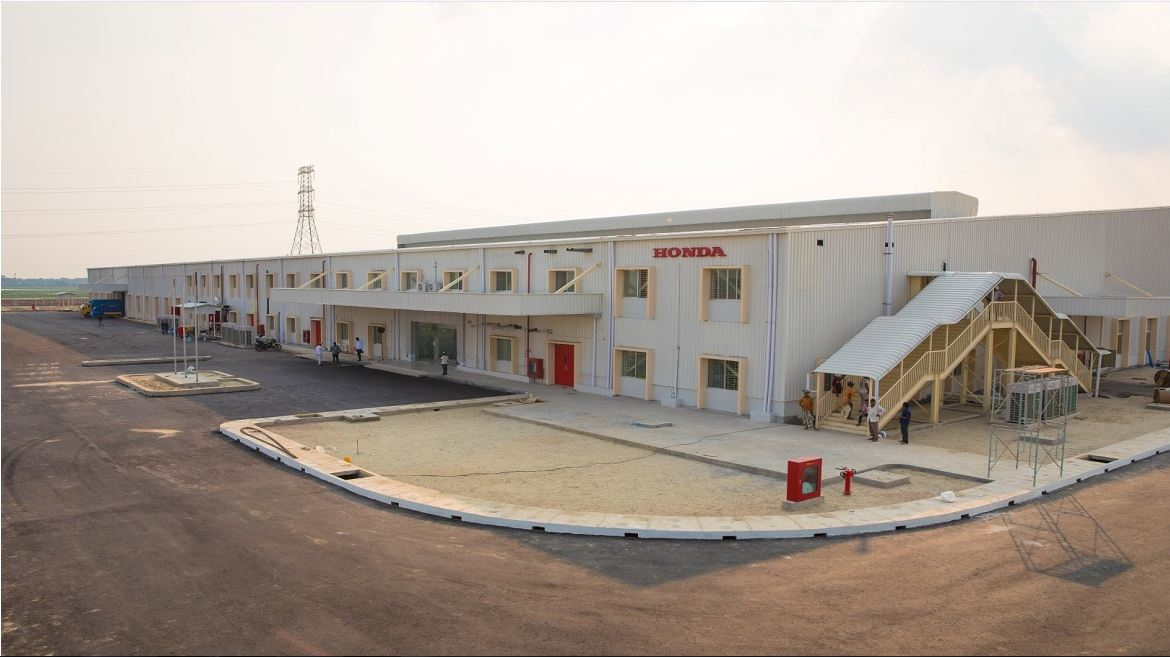
Manufacturing Plant of Honda Two Wheelers in Bangladesh

The automotive industry in Bangladesh is the third largest in South Asia.

Bangladesh has a few large car plants which assemble passenger cars from Mitsubishi and Toyota, as well as commercial vehicles from Hino and Tata.

Motorcycles, auto rickshaws and the locally designed Mishuk three-wheeler are manufactured in Bangladesh.

As of January 2024, there are 410,532 private passenger car, 121,387 microbus, 4.34 million motorcycle and a total of almost 6 million vehicles including the ones already stated.

==== Defence ====
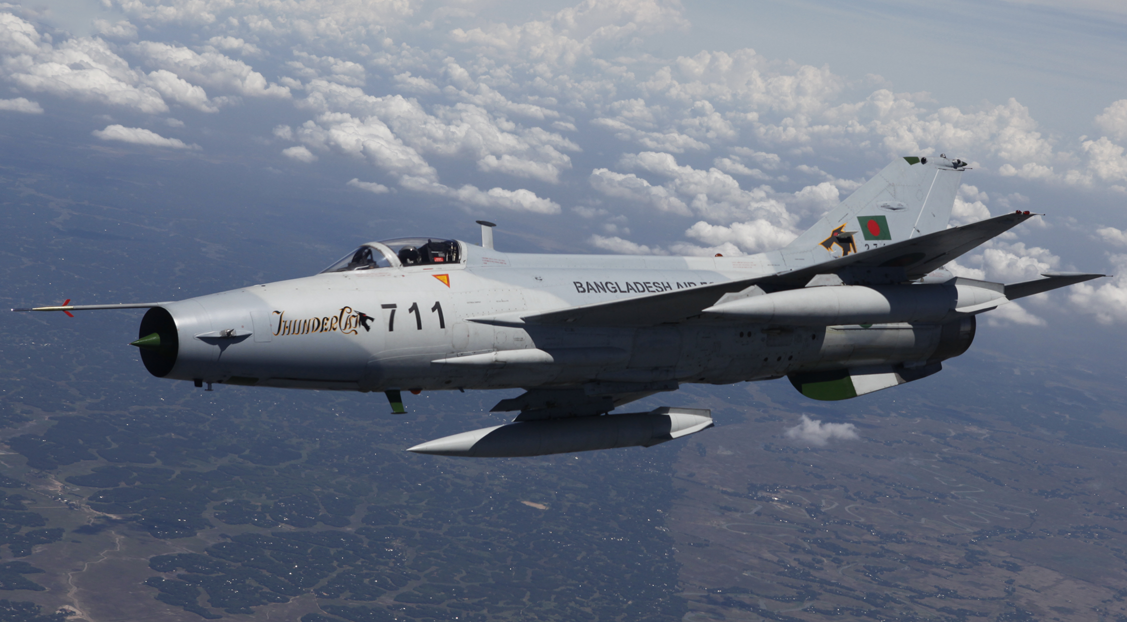
Bangladesh Air Force F-7BGi inflight

The defence industry of Bangladesh is a strategically important sector and a large employer in Bangladesh.The Government of Bangladesh is actively seeking to upgrade its military and security capabilities and has allocated increasing amounts to its defense and security-related budget.

The Directorate General of Defense Procurement (DGDP) manages procurements for the Ministry of Defense and the various armed forces, including the Army, Navy, and Air Force. Tenders for security and defense equipment and services are frequently open only to international bidders. Low pricing remains an issue for U.S. bidders, especially for items that can be procured regionally. In 2002, China and Bangladesh signed a "Defence Cooperation Agreement" which covers military training and defence production.

==== Electronics ====
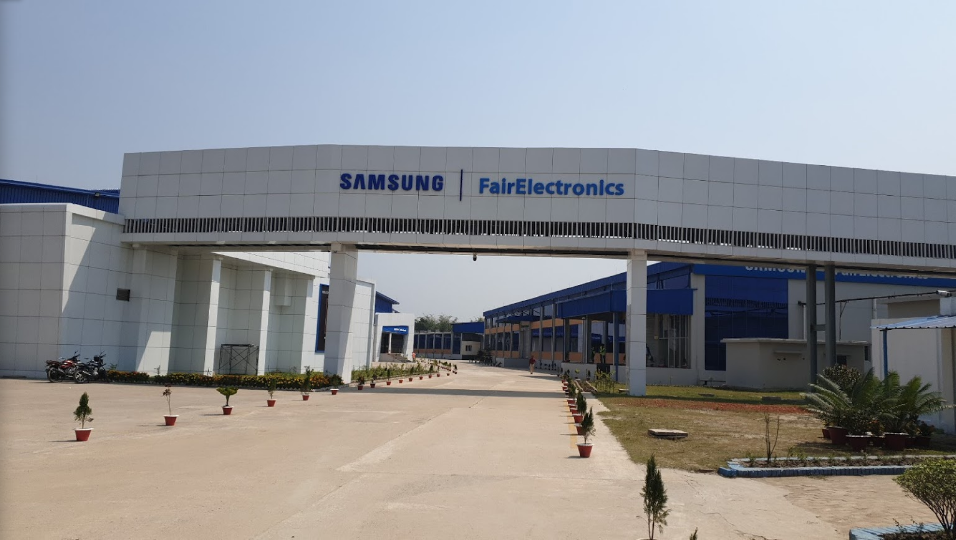
Manufacturing Plant of Fair Electronics for Samsung in Bangladesh

The electronics industry in Bangladesh is one of the fastest-growing industries in the country with great potential. Popular Bangladeshi electronics brands include Walton Electronics, Singer Bangladesh, Jamuna Electronics, Vision Electronics (PRAN-RFL Group). Local companies such as Fair Group, Butterfly Group, Electra, Rangs Group, Electro Mart, and Transcom Group manufacture and assembles Electronics Home Appliances in collaboration with foreign brands such as Samsung, Hisense, Whirlpool, LG, Sony, Gree, Konka, and Sharp.

==== Steel ====
BSRM Steel Mill

The steel industry is a vital and expanding sector of the Bangladesh economy. Centered in the port city of Chittagong, its growth is driven by the rapid expansion of shipbuilding, real estate, and large-scale national infrastructure projects.

==== Shipbuilding and shipbreaking ====
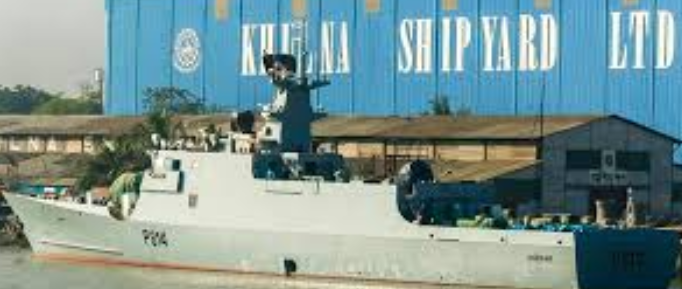
The BNS Durgam is a naval vessel built in Bangladesh.

Shipbuilding is a growing industry in Bangladesh with great potential. Due to the potential of shipbuilding in Bangladesh, the country has been compared to countries like China, Japan and South Korea. Referring to the growing amount of export deals secured by the shipbuilding companies as well as the low cost labour available in the country, experts suggest that Bangladesh could emerge as a major competitor in the global market of small to medium ocean-going vessels.

Bangladesh also has the world's largest ship breaking industry which employs over 200,000 Bangladeshis and accounts for half of all the steel in Bangladesh. Chittagong Ship Breaking Yard is the world's second-largest ship breaking area.

Khulna Shipyard Limited (KSY) with over five decades of reputation has been leading the Bangladesh Shipbuilding industry and had built a wide spectrum of ships for domestic and international clients. KSY built ships for Bangladesh Navy, Bangladesh Army and Bangladesh Coast Guard under the contract of ministry of defence.

=== Energy ===
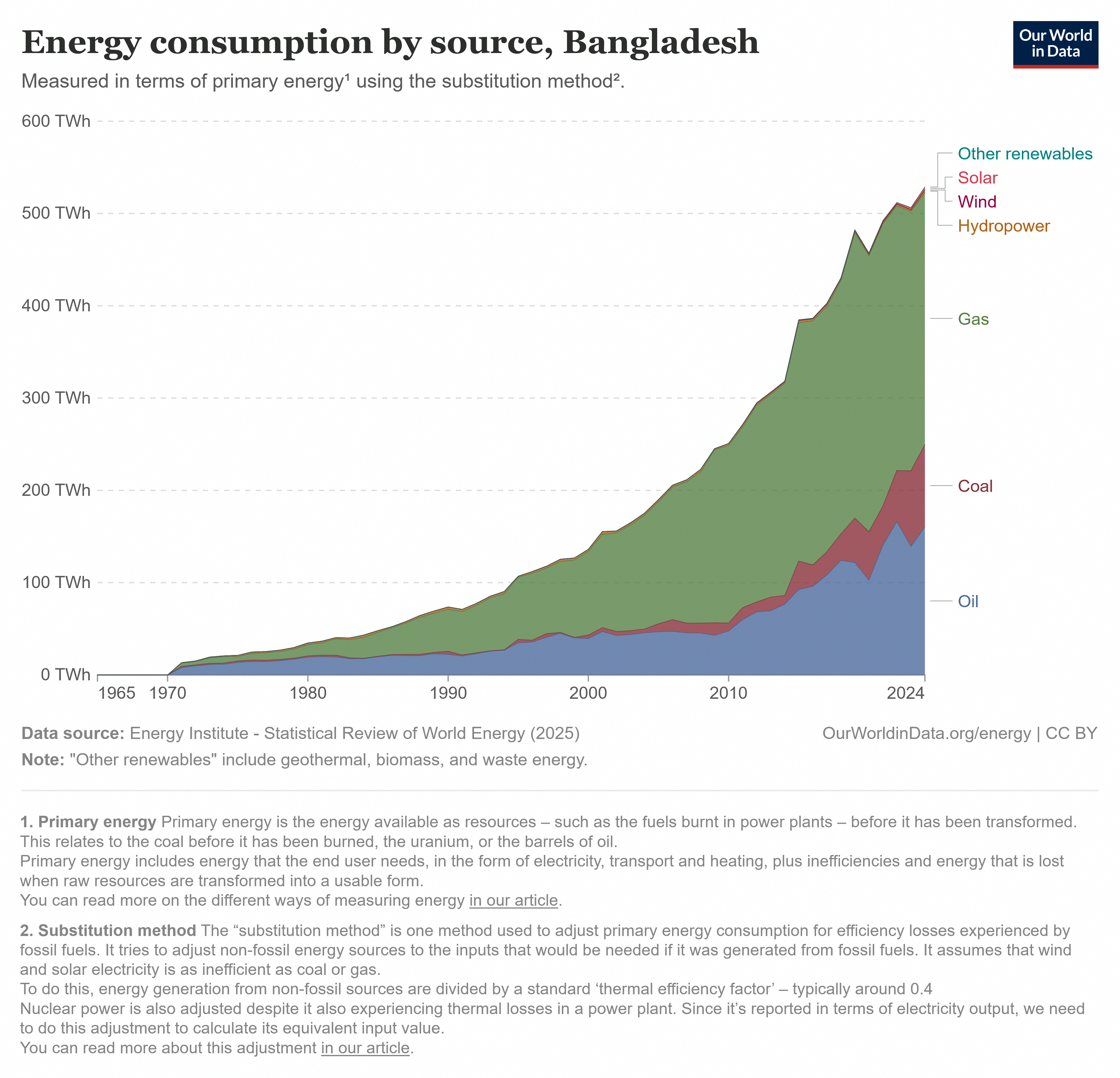
Energy consumption by source, Bangladesh

Energy in Bangladesh describes energy and electricity production, consumption and import in Bangladesh. Bangladesh is an emerging economy with a fast-growing energy consumption. Fossil fuels account for 98.9% of the country's energy consumption. Dwindling natural gas production has forced the country to become increasingly reliant on imported energy, exposing it to price fluctuations in the international market. Investment into nuclear energy and renewable energy production is aiming to mitigate this.

The country is an import dependent energy market.

=== Water supply and sanitation ===
Bangladesh is faced with multiple water quality and quantity problems (such as salinity, groundwater depletion and natural arsenic contamination of groundwater) along with regular natural disasters, such as cyclones and floods. Available options for providing safe drinking water include tubewells, traditionally dug wells, treatment of surface water, desalination of groundwater with high salinity levels, and rainwater harvesting.

Only 56% of the population was estimated to have access to adequate sanitation facilities in 2010. A new approach to improve sanitation coverage in rural areas, called the community-led total sanitation concept, has helped to increase the sanitation coverage. Basic sanitation was available to 59.3% of the population as of 2022. progress for basic sanitation have been considered too slow by Joint Monitoring Programme for Water Supply and Sanitation (JMP)

Bangladesh has a low level of cost recovery due to low tariffs and poor economic efficiency, especially in urban areas where revenues from water sales do not cover operating costs.

=== Services ===
==== Finance and banking ====
Most banks in Bangladesh are privately owned. Until the 1980s, the financial sector of Bangladesh was dominated by state-owned banks. With the grand-scale reform made in finance, private commercial banks were established through privatisation. The next finance sector reform programme was launched from 2000 to 2006 with focus on the development of financial institutions and adoption of risk-based regulations and supervision by Bangladesh Bank. As of date, the banking sector consisted of 4 SCBs, 4 government-owned specialized banks dealing in development financing, 39 private commercial banks, and 9 foreign commercial banks.

==== Education ====
Education in Bangladesh is administered generally by the country's Ministry of Education. The Ministry of Primary and Mass Education implements policies for primary education and state-funded schools at a local level. Constitutionally, education in Bangladesh is compulsory for all citizens until the end of grade eight. Primary and secondary education are partially funded by the state, and free of charge in public institutions.

Bangladesh conforms fully to the UN's Education For All (EFA) objectives and the Millennium Development Goals (MDG) as well as other education-related international declarations. Now, the government of Bangladesh tends to align the curriculum that meets the "Goal: SDG-4" that is the "Quality Education" characterized in the charter of "Sustainable Development Goal 4". Article 17 of the Bangladesh Constitution provides that all children shall receive free and compulsory education.

The Human Rights Measurement Initiative (HRMI) finds that Bangladesh is fulfilling only 67.4% of what it should be fulfilling for the right to education based on the country's level of income. HRMI breaks down the right to education by looking at the rights to both primary education and secondary education. While taking into consideration Bangladesh's income level, the nation is achieving 99.2% of what should be possible based on its resources (income) for primary education but only 63.7% for secondary education. Over the course of the past five decades, Bangladesh has achieved commendable advancements in the domain of education. As education stands as an indispensable human right, dedicated efforts are being exerted to guarantee its accessibility for every individual. Looking ahead to the next decade, it is conceivable that Bangladesh will attain a full literacy rate of 100 percent.

A noteworthy facet in Bangladesh is the near-universal enrollment of children in schools, evident through a primary school net enrollment rate of 98%. Additionally, an increasing number of female students are enrolling in school, subsequently entering the workforce and making substantial contributions to the expansion of various economic sectors. The government in recent years has made notable efforts at improving women's educational condition in the country.

==== Healthcare ====
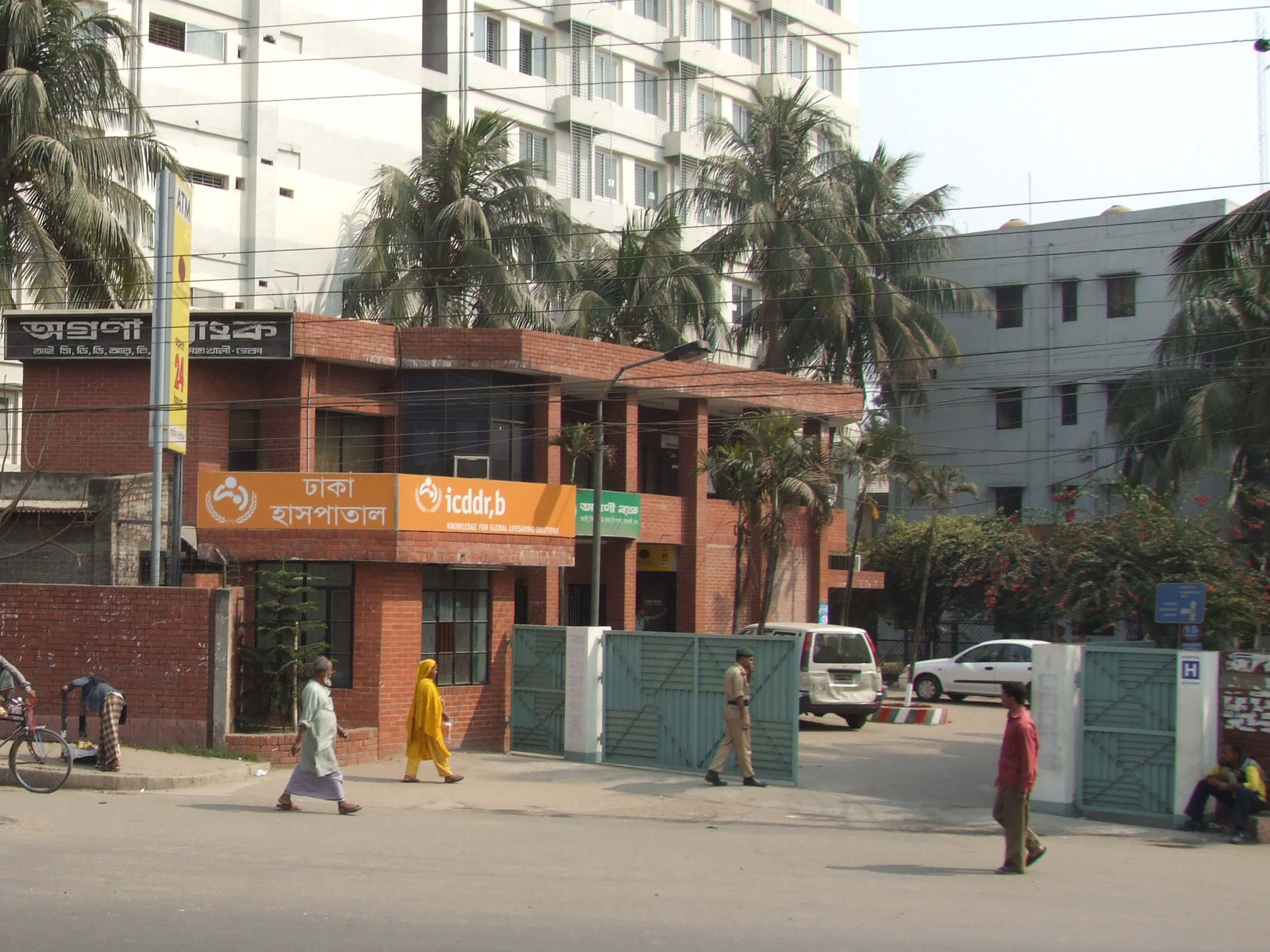
International Centre for Diarrhoeal Disease Research Office, Bangladesh

Bangladesh is one of the most populous countries in the world, as well as having one of the fastest growing economies in the world. Consequently, Bangladesh faces challenges and opportunities in regard to public health. A remarkable metamorphosis has unfolded in Bangladesh, encompassing the demographic, health, and nutritional dimensions of its populace.

The Human Rights Measurement Initiative finds that Bangladesh is fulfilling 89.3% of what it should be fulfilling for the right to health based on its level of income. When looking at the right to health with respect to children, Bangladesh achieves 95.0% of what is expected based on its current income. In regard to the right to health amongst the adult population, the country achieves only 94.2% of what is expected based on the nation's level of income. Bangladesh falls into the "bad" category when evaluating the right to reproductive health because the nation is fulfilling only 78.8% of what the nation is expected to achieve based on the resources (income) it has available.

==== Information and communication technology ====
Bangladesh's information technology sector is a sector that has seen much growth in the past three years. Bangladesh has 80 million internet users, an estimated 9% growth in internet use by June 2017 powered by mobile internet. Bangladesh currently has an active 23 million Facebook users. Bangladesh currently has 143.1 million mobile phone customers. Bangladesh exported $800 million worth of software, games, outsourcing and services to European countries, the United States, Canada, Russia and India by 30 June 2017.

==== Telecommunications ====
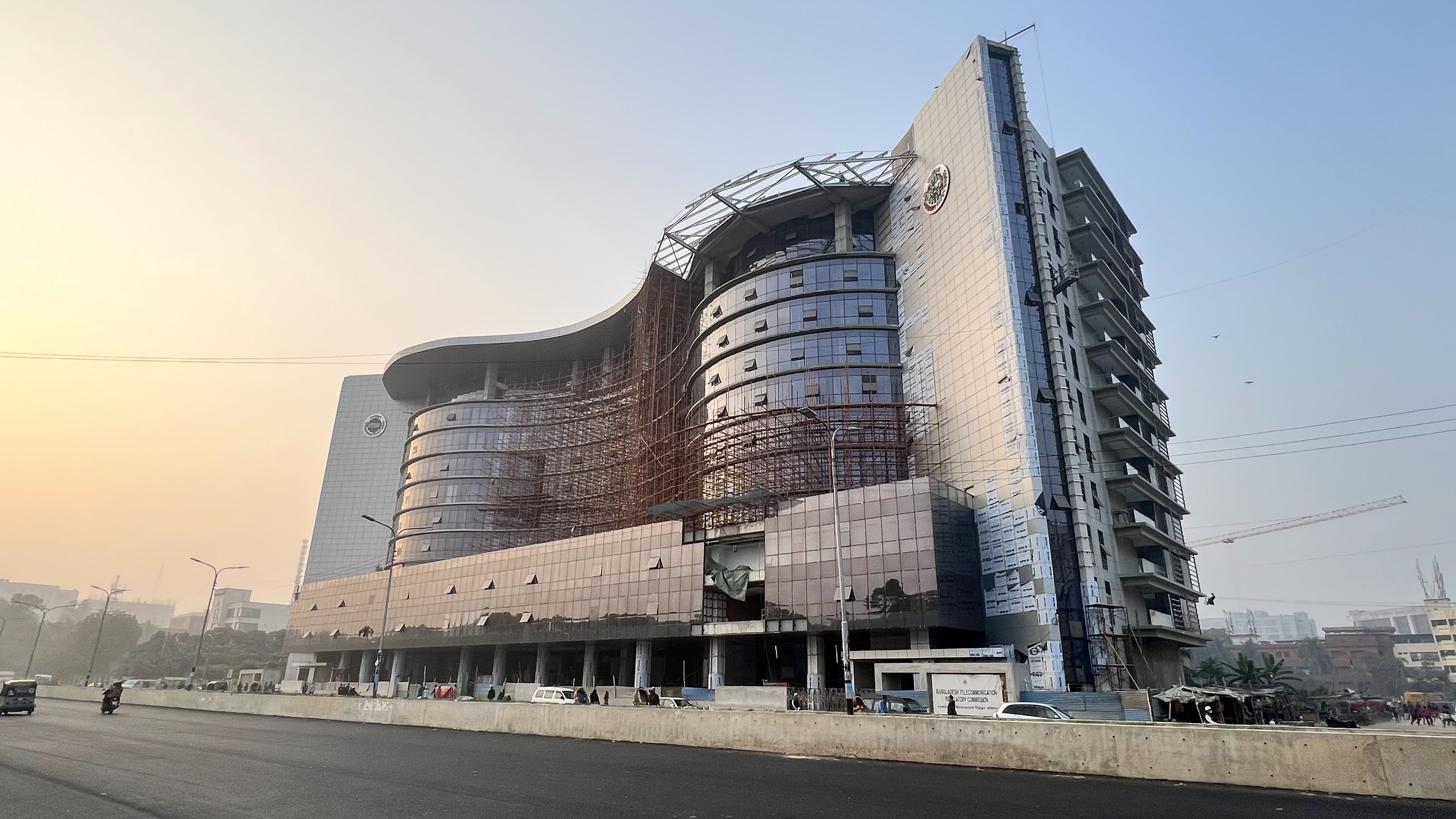
BTRC Bhaban

The telecom sector in Bangladesh is rapidly emerging. Bangladesh Telecommunication Regulatory Commission (BTRC) is the regulatory authority for this sector, overseeing licensing, policy, etc.

The calling code of Bangladesh is +880. There are also several SubCodes.

==== Transport ====
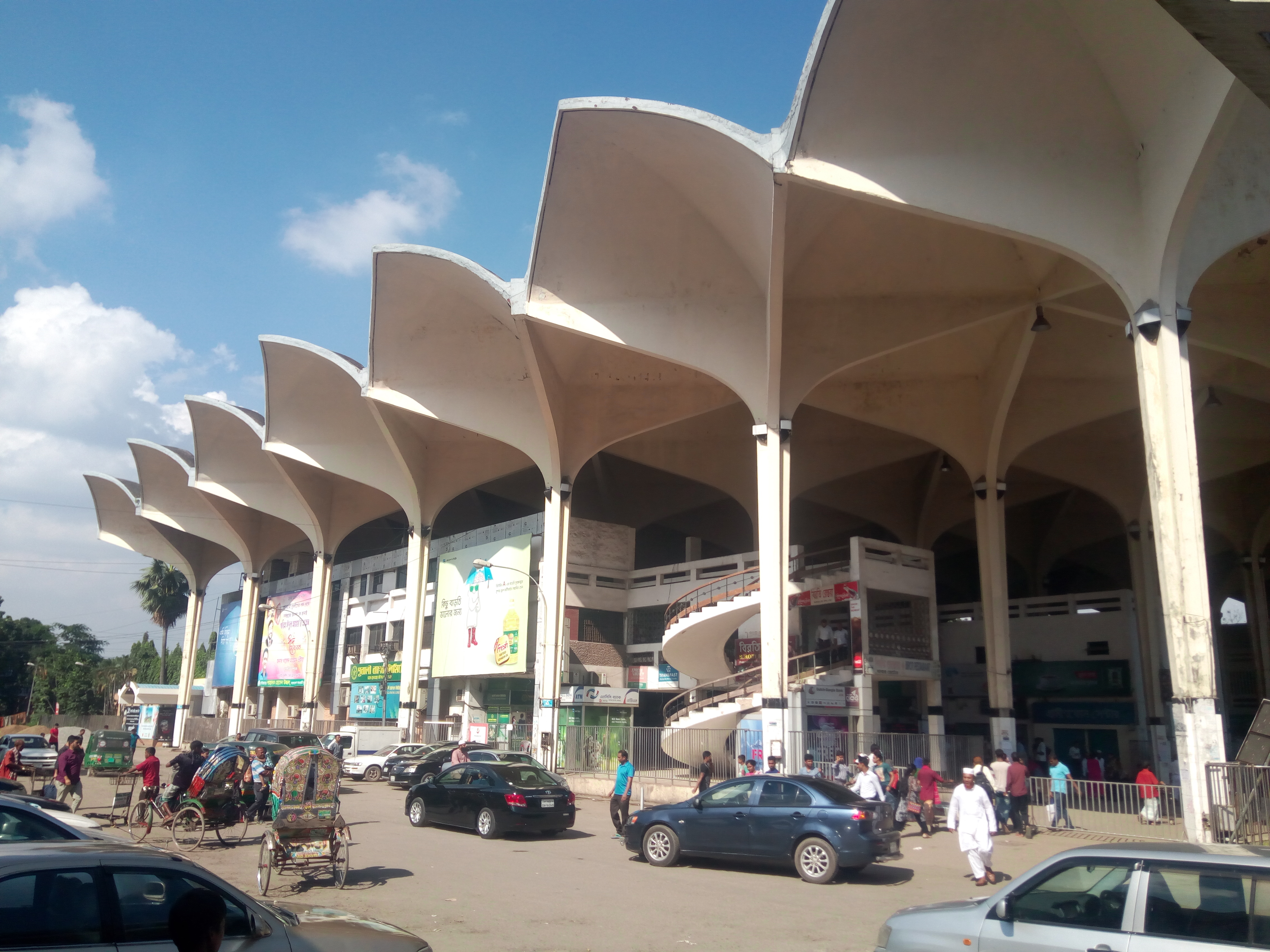
Kamalapur Railway Station

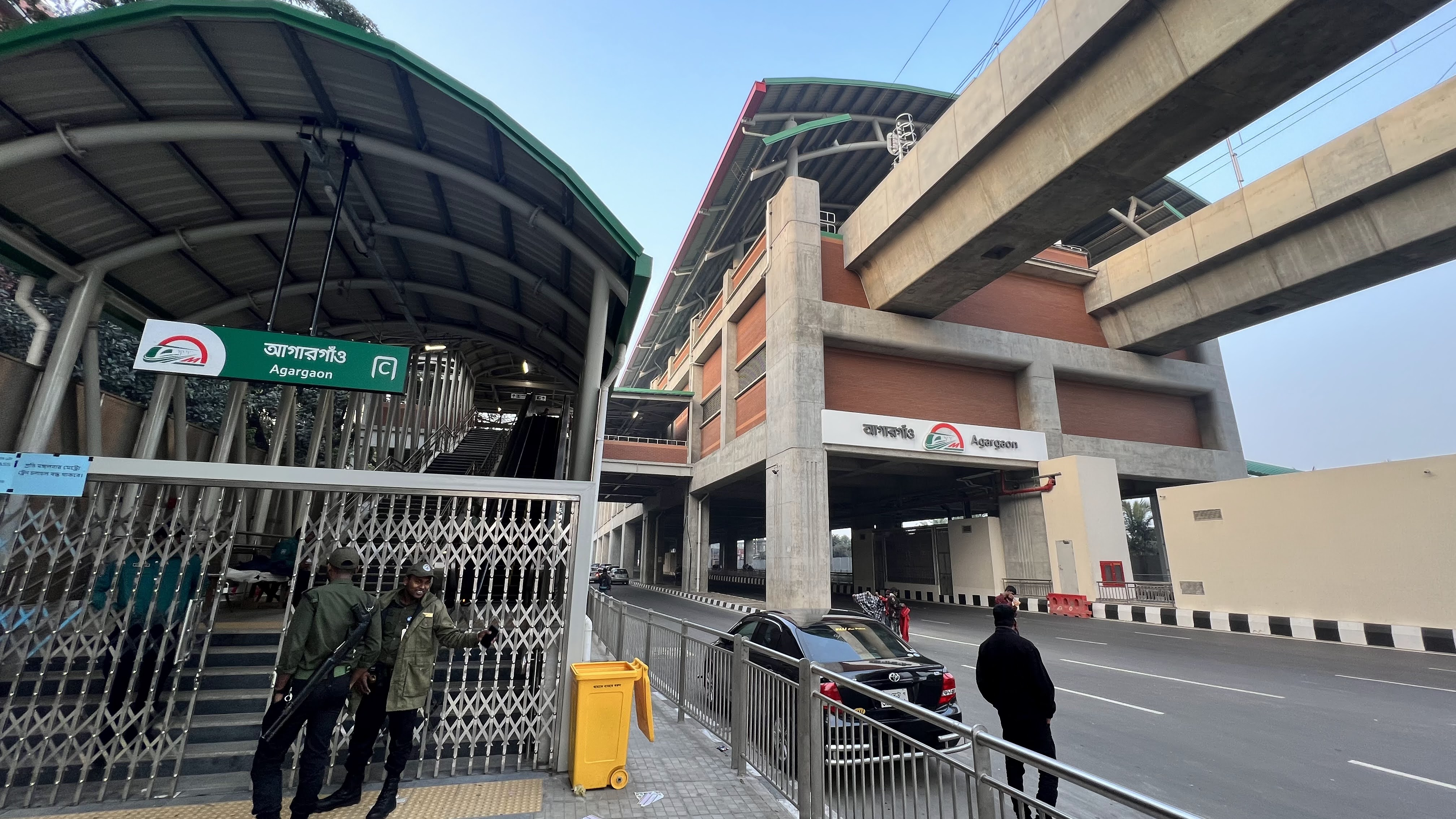
Agargaon Metrorail Station

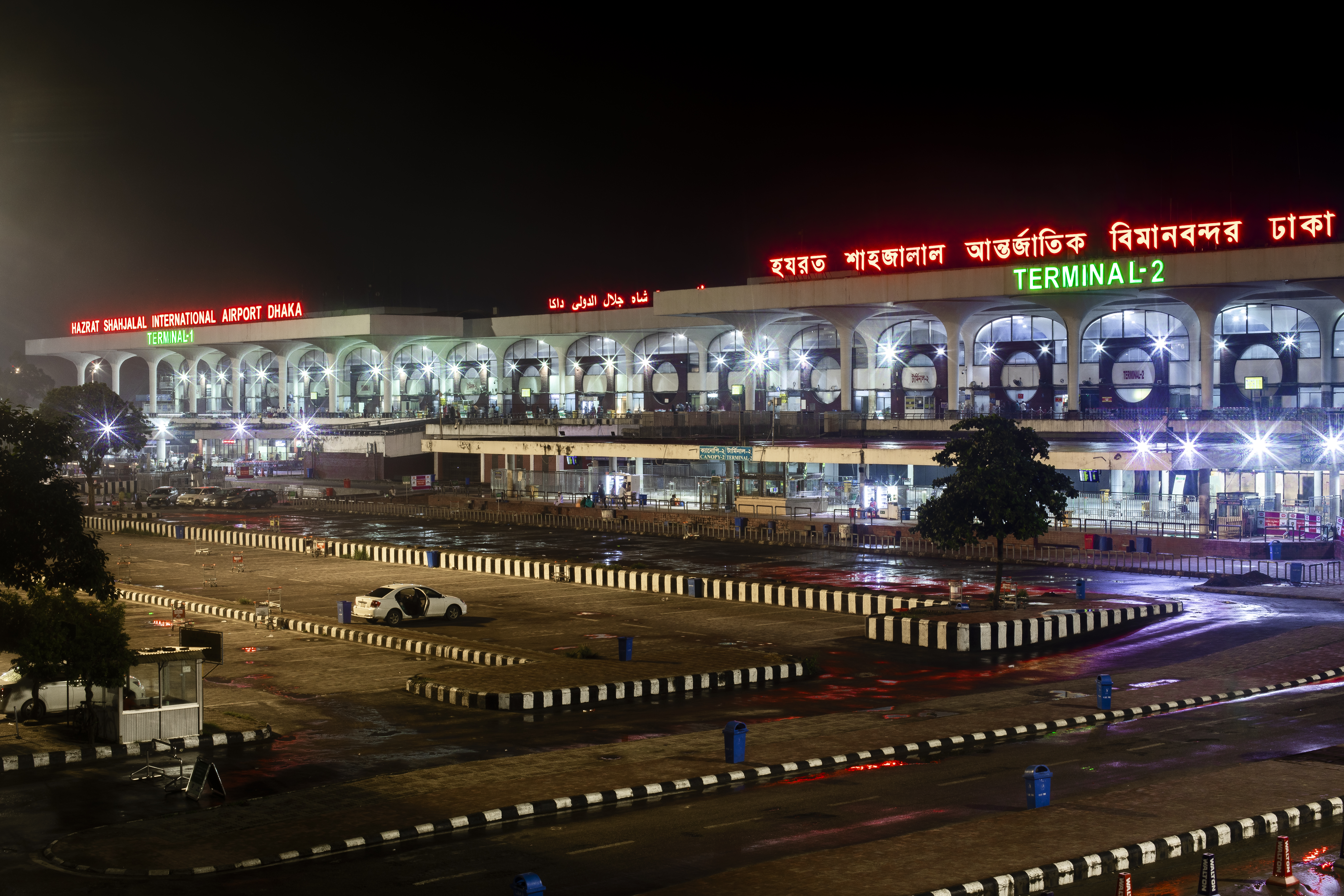
Hazrat Shahjalal International Airport.jpg

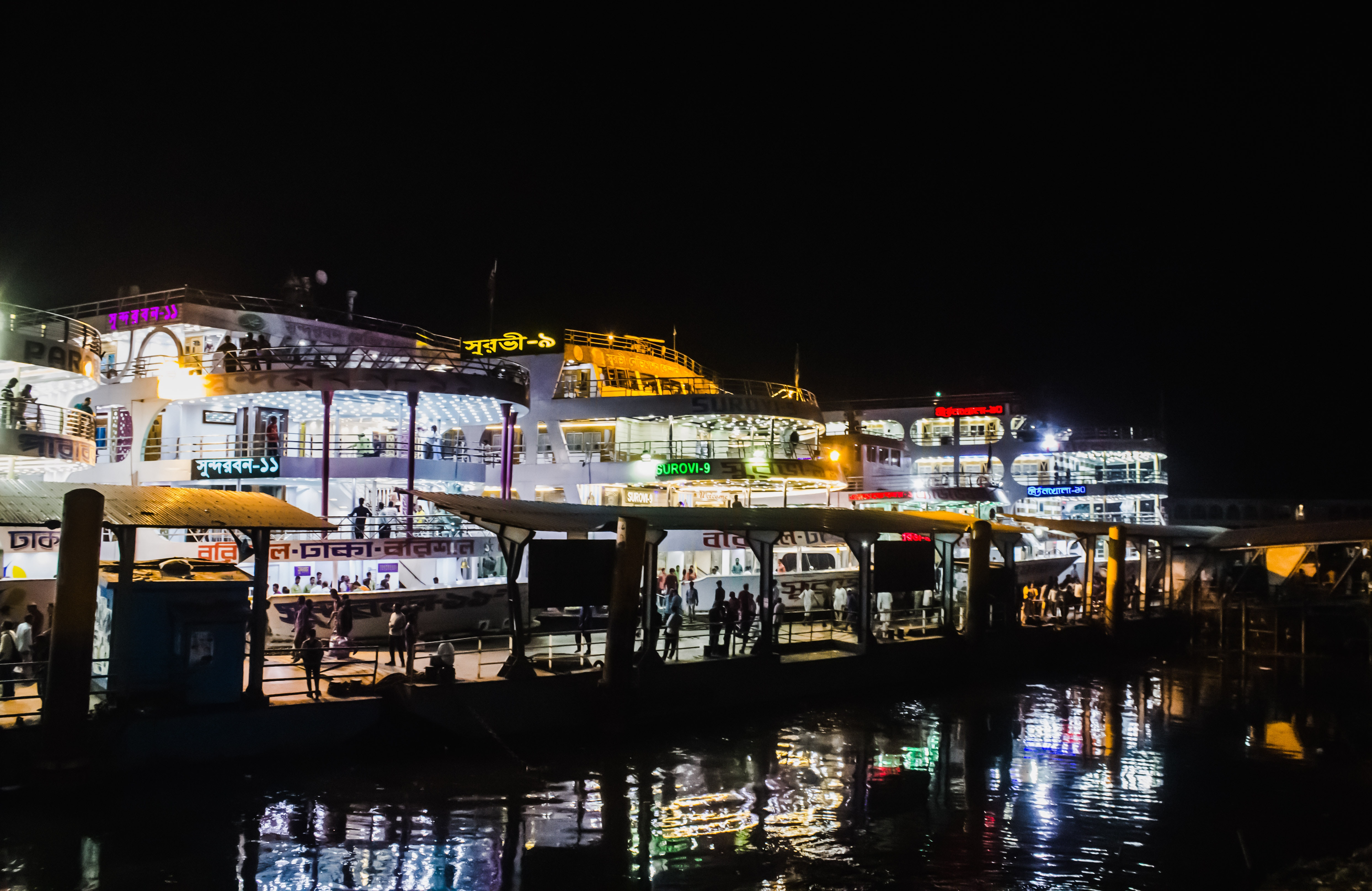
Sadarghat Launch Terminal

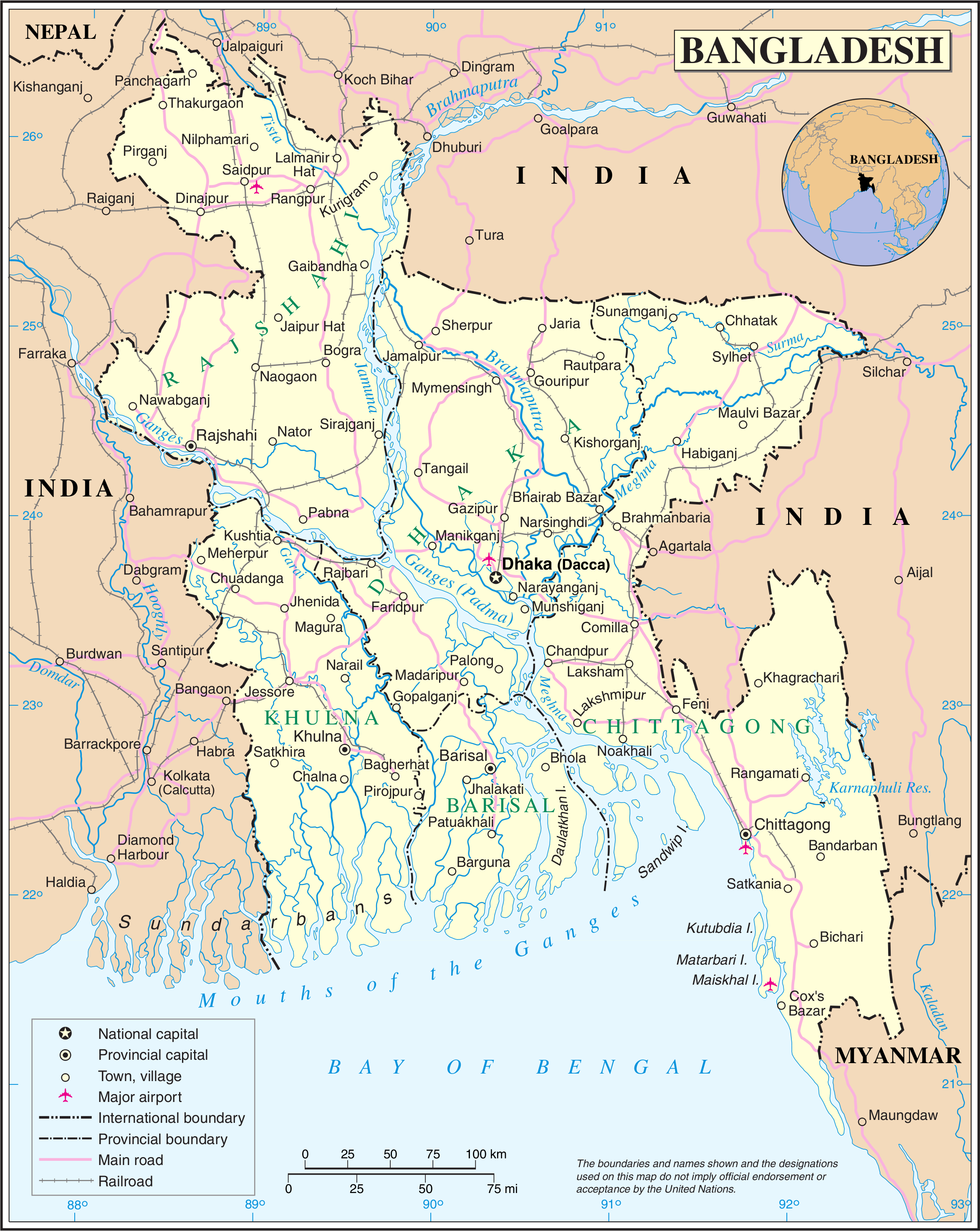
Transport map of Bangladesh

Transport in Bangladesh is dominated by roadways, accounting for the majority of both passenger and cargo traffic due to substantial development efforts since independence. Eight major national highways connect the capital, Dhaka, with divisional and district headquarters, port cities, and international routes. Despite this, vehicle usage per capita remains low, with non-motorised modes prevailing. However, Bangladesh's roads are unsafe, having one of the highest road accident fatality rates. They also suffer from high congestion, as well as severe air and noise pollution.

The share of railway traffic has seen a significant decline since 1975, facing challenges like shortage of rolling stock and poor track conditions. Transportation through inland waterways, though also declining, remains popular thanks to Bangladesh's extensive river network and the use of ferries.

Air travel in Bangladesh is supported by three international and five domestic airports, of which Hazrat Shahjalal is the largest and busiest. Biman Bangladesh, the national airline, and the privately owned US-Bangla are the two international carriers based in Bangladesh, which also operate domestic flights to these airports alongside three other private airlines.

In 2023, Bangladesh ranked 88 in the Logistics Performance Index among 139 countries and third among South Asian countries, after India and Sri Lanka.

==== Tourism ====
The World Travel and Tourism Council (WTTC) reported in 2013 that the travel and tourism industry in Bangladesh directly generated 1,281,500 jobs in 2012 or 1.8 percent of the country's total employment, which ranked Bangladesh 157 out of 178 countries worldwide. Direct and indirect employment in the industry totalled 2,714,500 jobs, or 3.7 percent of the country's total employment. The WTTC predicted that by 2023, travel and tourism will directly generate 1,785,000 jobs and support an overall total of 3,891,000 jobs, or 4.2 percent of the country's total employment. This would represent an annual growth rate in direct jobs of 2.9 percent. Domestic spending generated 97.7 percent of direct travel and tourism gross domestic product (GDP) in 2012. Bangladesh's world ranking in 2012 for travel and tourism's direct contribution to GDP, as a percentage of GDP, was 142 out of 176.

In 2014, 125,000 tourists visited Bangladesh. This number is extremely low relative to total population. As of 22 May 2019 the total local population numbering 166,594,000 inhabitants. This gives a ratio of 1 tourist for every 1,333 locals.

== Investment ==
The stock market capitalisation of the Dhaka Stock Exchange in Bangladesh crossed $10 billion in November 2007 and the $30 billion mark in 2009, and US$50 billion in August 2010. Bangladesh had the best performing stock market in Asia during the recent global recession between 2007 and 2010, due to relatively low correlations with developed country stock markets.

Major investment in real estate by domestic and foreign-resident Bangladeshis has led to a massive building boom in Dhaka and Chittagong.

Recent (2011) trends for investing in Bangladesh as Saudi Arabia trying to secure public and private investment in oil and gas, power and transportation projects, United Arab Emirates (UAE) is keen to invest in growing shipbuilding industry in Bangladesh encouraged by comparative cost advantage, Tata, an India-based leading industrial multinational to invest Taka 1500 crore to set up an automobile industry in Bangladesh, World Bank to invest in rural roads improving quality of live, the Rwandan entrepreneurs are keen to invest in Bangladesh's pharmaceuticals sector considering its potentiality in international market, Samsung sought to lease 500 industrial plots from the export zones authority to set up an electronics hub in Bangladesh with an investment of US$1.25 billion, National Board of Revenue (NBR) is set to withdraw tax rebate facilities on investment in the capital market by individual taxpayers from the fiscal 2011–12. In 2011, Japan Bank for International Cooperation ranked Bangladesh as the 15th best investment destination for foreign investors.

=== 2010–11 market crash ===
The bullish capital market turned bearish during 2010, with the exchange losing 1,800 points between December 2010 and January 2011. Millions of investors have been rendered bankrupt as a result of the market crash. The crash has been alleged to have been artificially induced, benefiting a small group of market participants at the expense of larger investors.

=== Companies ===
The list includes ten largest Bangladeshi companies by trading value (millions in BDT) in 2018.

| Company | Trading name at Dhaka Stock Exchange | Headquarters | Industry | Trading Value |
|---|---|---|---|---|
| Square Pharmaceuticals Limited | SQURPHARMA | Dhaka | Pharmaceuticals | 449.8880 |
| Dragon Sweater and Spinning Limited | DSSL | Dhaka | Apparel | 129.4030 |
| Ifad Autos Limited | IFADAUTOS | Dhaka | Automotive | 117.5370 |
| Grameenphone Private Limited | GP | Dhaka | Telecommunications | 106.8660 |
| Bangladesh Thai Aluminium Ltd | BDTHAI | Dhaka | Manufacturing | 99.7690 |
| City Bank Limited | CITYBANK | Dhaka | Banking | 78.6010 |
| Golden Harvest | GHAIL | Dhaka | Agriculture | 76.6710 |
| IPDC Finance Limited | IPDC | Dhaka | Financial Services | 67.0430 |
| Olympic industries limited | OLYMPIC | Dhaka | Manufacturing | 60.5570 |
| Shahjalal Islami Bank Limited | SHAHJABANK | Dhaka | Banking | 53.1710 |

=== Composition of economic sectors ===
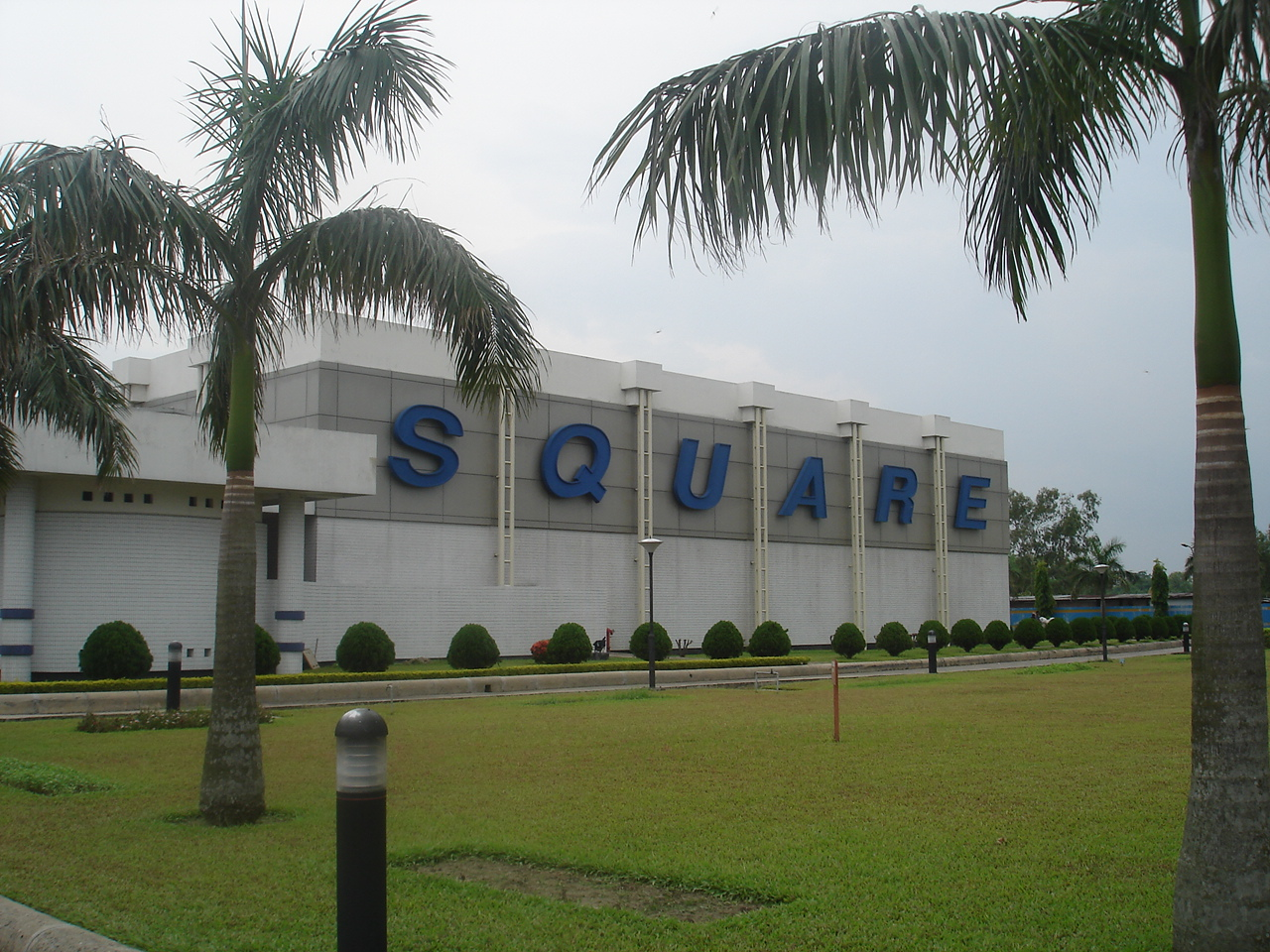
A Square Pharmaceuticals plant in Gazipur

The Bangladesh Garments Manufacturers and Exporters Association (BGMEA) has predicted textile exports will rise from US$7.90 billion earned in 2005–06 to US$15 billion by 2011. In part this optimism stems from how well the sector has fared since the end of textile and clothing quotas, under the Multifibre Agreement, in early 2005. According to a United Nations Development Programme report "Sewing Thoughts: How to Realize Human Development Gains in the Post-Quota World" Bangladesh has been able to offset a decline in European sales by cultivating new markets in the United States. "[In 2005] we had tremendous growth. The quota-free textile regime has proved to be a big boost for our factories," said BGMEA president S.M. Fazlul Hoque told reporters, after the sector's 24 per cent growth rate was revealed. The Bangladesh Knitwear Manufacturers and Exporters Association (BKMEA) president Md Fazlul Hoque has also struck an optimistic tone. In an interview with United News Bangladesh he lauded the blistering growth rate, saying "The quality of our products and its competitiveness in terms of prices helped the sector achieve such... tremendous success." Knitwear posted the strongest growth of all textile products in 2005–06, surging 35.38 per cent to US$2.82 billion. On the downside however, the sector's strong growth came amid sharp falls in prices for textile products on the world market, with growth subsequently dependent upon large increases in volume. Bangladesh's quest to boost the quantity of textile trade was also helped by US and EU caps on Chinese textiles. The US cap restricts growth in imports of Chinese textiles to 12.5 per cent next year and between 15 and 16 per cent in 2008. The EU deal similarly manages import growth until 2008. Bangladesh may continue to benefit from these restrictions over the next two years, however a climate of falling global textile prices forces wage rates the centre of the nation's efforts to increase market share. They offer a range of incentives to potential investors including 10-year tax holidays, duty-free import of capital goods, raw materials and building materials, exemptions on income tax on salaries paid to foreign nationals for three years and dividend tax exemptions for the period of the tax holiday. All goods produced in the zones are able to be exported duty-free, in addition to which Bangladesh benefits from the Generalised System of Preferences in US, European and Japanese markets and is also endowed with Most Favoured Nation status from the United States. Furthermore, Bangladesh imposes no ceiling on investment in the EPZs and allows full repatriation of profits. The formation of labour unions within the EPZs is prohibited as are strikes.

Bangladesh has been a world leader in its efforts to end the use of child labour in garment factories. On 4 July 1995, the Bangladesh Garment Manufacturers and Exporters Association, International Labour Organization, and UNICEF signed a memorandum of understanding on the elimination of child labour in the garment sector. Implementation of this pioneering agreement began in fall 1995, and by the end of 1999, child labour in the garment trade virtually had been eliminated. The labour-intensive process of ship breaking for scrap has developed to the point where it now meets most of Bangladesh's domestic steel needs. Other industries include sugar, tea, leather goods, newsprint, pharmaceutical, and fertilizer production.

The Bangladesh government continues to court foreign investment, something it has done fairly successfully in private power generation and gas exploration and production, as well as in other sectors such as cellular telephony, textiles, and pharmaceuticals. In 1989, the same year it signed a bilateral investment treaty with the United States, it established a Board of Investment to simplify approval and start-up procedures for foreign investors, although in practice the board has done little to increase investment. The government created the Bangladesh Export Processing Zone Authority to manage the various export processing zones. The agency currently manages EPZs in Adamjee, Chittagong, Comilla, Dhaka, Ishwardi, Karnaphuli, Mongla, and Uttara. An EPZ has also been proposed for Sylhet. The government has given the private sector permission to build and operate competing EPZs-initial construction on a Korean EPZ started in 1999. In June 1999, the AFL–CIO petitioned the U.S. Government to deny Bangladesh access to U.S. markets under the Generalized System of Preferences (GSP), citing the country's failure to meet promises made in 1992 to allow freedom of association in EPZs.

== International trade ==
Exports of Bangladesh by product category (2019) Chemical products Transportation Machines Mineral products Plastics and rubbers Metals Foodstuffs Precious metals Textiles Instruments Animal products Vegetable products Paper goods Footwear and headwear Miscellaneous Stone and glass Wood products Animal and vegetable bi-products Animal hides Arts and antiques Weapons

The COVID-19 pandemictook a heavy toll on almost all sectors of the economy; most notably, it has caused a reduction of exports by 16.93 percent, and imports by 17 percent in the FY2019-20.

In 2015, the top exports of Bangladesh are Non-Knit Men's Suits ($5.6B), Knit T-shirts ($5.28B), Knit Sweaters ($4.12B), Non-Knit Women's Suits ($3.66B) and Non-Knit Men's Shirts ($2.52B). In 2015, the top imports of Bangladesh are Heavy Pure Woven Cotton ($1.33B), Refined Petroleum ($1.25B), Light Pure Woven Cotton ($1.12B), Raw Cotton ($1.01B) and Wheat ($900M).

In 2015, the top export destinations of Bangladesh are the United States ($6.19B), Germany ($5.17B), the United Kingdom ($3.53B), France ($2.37B) and Spain ($2.29B). In 2015, the top import origins are China ($13.9B), India ($5.51B), Singapore ($2.22B), Hong Kong ($1.47B) and Japan ($1.36B).

== Remittances ==
Remittances to Bangladesh are money transfers (remittances) sent by the Bangladeshi diaspora to Bangladesh. According to the World Bank, Bangladesh is the 7th highest recipient of remittances in the world with almost $32.8 billion in 2025 and was the third highest recipient of remittances in South Asia. These transfers play a significant role in the Bangladeshi economy, contributing substantially to the country's foreign exchange reserves and national income. A survey on remittance usage conducted by the Bangladesh Bureau of Statistics in 2013 showed that 32.81% and 32.82% of the remittances are used for food and non-food expenditures. 18.84% of remittances were used for durable and other expenses including 17.39% utilised for the purchase of land. In regards to investment and savings, the Bangladesh Bureau of Statistics revealed that 33.45% of remittances goes to investment and 13.74% of remittances goes to savings. Presently, the World Bank stands as the foremost external financier for Bangladesh. The determination to sustain funding is rooted in Bangladesh's remarkable accomplishments and the essential measures needed to sustain its advancement towards the objective of attaining upper-middle-income status by 2031.

== Poverty ==
Bangladesh is a developing country nation. Despite rapid economic growth, poverty remains a major issue, although it has declined sharply in recent history. Shortly after its independence, approximately 90% of the population lived under the poverty line. Economic reforms and trade liberalization of early 1990s, along with accelerated economic growth since early-2000s, have resulted in progress in reducing poverty, being recognized by international institutions. According to World Bank, more than 33 million Bangladeshi people have been lifted out of poverty since 2000; as measured by the percentage of people living on the equivalent of US$1.90 or less per day in 2011 purchasing price parity terms.

Since the early-2000s, rapid economic growth has fueled a significant increase in per-capita income. Bangladesh's per capita has increased almost threefold between 2010 and 2020, from under $700 to $2,068 (the highest GDP per capita in South Asia) moving Bangladesh into the ranks of middle-income economy. At its current growth, Bangladesh is projected to enter upper-middle income status by 2041, although this rate of growth may not be sustainable.

Based on the current rate of poverty reduction, Bangladesh is projected to eradicate extreme poverty by 2031, as outlined in its Eighth Five-Year Plan (2020–2025) and supported by reports from organizations such as the World Bank and the Asian Development Bank. However, poverty levels have decreased by less than half a percent in 2017 to 2019, half it's prior rate.

Bangladesh has exhibited accomplishments in poverty reduction, ensuring food security, enhancing primary education, reducing mortality ratios, expanding immunization coverage, and effectively addressing communicable diseases.

== Bangladeshi women and the economy ==
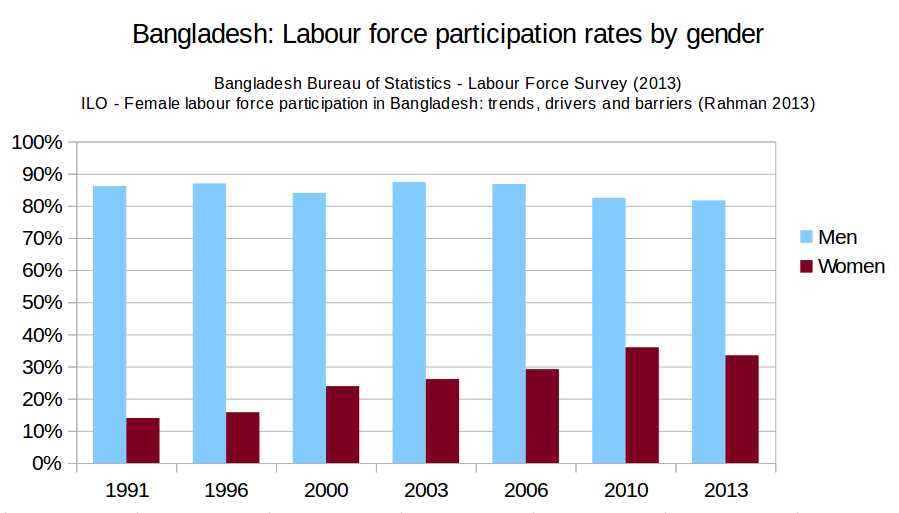
Male and female labour participation rates

As of 2014, female participation in the labour force is 58 percent as per World Bank data, and male participation at 82 percent. Through the efforts of government and non-governmental organizations like CARE International, the participation of women in the Bangladeshi politics and the economy has improved drastically.

A 2007 World Bank report stated that the areas in which women's work force participation have increased the most are in the fields of agriculture, education and health and social work. Over three-quarters of women in the labour force work in the agricultural sector. On the other hand, the International Labour Organization reports that women's workforce participation has only increased in the professional and administrative areas between 2000 and 2005, demonstrating women's increased participation in sectors that require higher education. Employment and labour force participation data from the World Bank, the UN, and the ILO vary and often under report on women's work due to unpaid labour and informal sector jobs. Though these fields are mostly paid, women experience very different work conditions than men, including wage differences and work benefits. Women's wages are significantly lower than men's wages for the same job with women being paid as much as 60–75 percent less than what men make.

One example of action that is being taken to improve female conditions in the work force is Non-Governmental Organisations. These NGOs encourage women to rely on their own self-savings, rather than external funds provide women with increased decision-making and participation within the family and society. However, some NGOs that address microeconomic issues among individual families fail to deal with broader macroeconomic issues that prevent women's complete autonomy and advancement.

== Historical statistics ==
Bangladesh has made significant strides in its economic sector performance since independence in 1971. Although the economy has improved vastly in the 1990s, Bangladesh still suffers in the area of foreign trade in South Asian. Despite major impediments to growth like the inefficiency of state-owned enterprises, a rapidly growing labour force that cannot be absorbed by agriculture, inadequate power supplies, and slow implementation of economic reforms, Bangladesh has made some headway improving the climate for foreign investors and liberalising the capital markets; for example, it has negotiated with foreign firms for oil and gas exploration, bettered the countrywide distribution of cooking gas, and initiated the construction of natural gas pipelines and power stations. Progress on other economic reforms has been halting because of opposition from the bureaucracy, public sector unions, and other vested interest groups.

The especially severe floods of 1998 increased the flow of foreign aid. The 2008 financial crisis did not have a major impact on the economy. Foreign aid has seen a gradual decline over the last few decades but economists see this as a good sign for self-reliance. There has been a dramatic growth in exports and remittance inflow which has helped the economy to expand at a steady rate. Bangladesh's GDP is expected to grow at 5.3 percent in 2023 and 6.5 percent in 2024 according to the latest ADB report.

Bangladesh has been on the list of UN Least Developed Countries (LDC) since 1975. Bangladesh met the requirements to be recognised as a developing country in March 2018 with Bangladesh's Gross National Income (GNI) US$1,724 per capita, the Human Assets Index (HAI) 72 and the Economic Vulnerability (EVI) Index 25.2 then. Bangladesh's GNI is now forecasted to reach at US$4,753.39 in 2030.

=== Gross export and import ===
| Fiscal Year | Total Exports (in bn. US$) | Total Imports (in bn. US$) | Foreign Remittance Earnings (in bn. US$) |
|---|---|---|---|
| 2007–2008 | ▲$14.11 | ▲$25.21 | ▲$8.9 |
| 2008–2009 | ▲$15.56 | ▼$22.51 | ▲$9.68 |
| 2009–2010 | ▲$16.7 | ▲$23.83 | ▲$10.87 |
| 2010–2011 | ▲$22.93 | ▲$32 | ▲$11.65 |
| 2011–2012 | ▲$24.30 | ▲$35.92 | ▲$12.85 |
| 2012–2013 | ▲$27.09 | ▼$34.09 | ▲$14.4 |
| 2013–2014 | ▲$30.10 | ▼$34.08 | ▼$14.2 |
| 2014–2015 | ▲$31.014 | ▲$47.260 | ▲$14.23 |
| 2015-2016 | ▲$33.661 | ▲$49.436 | ▼$13.60 |
| 2016-2017 | ▲$37.966 | ▲$59.561 | ▼$12.76 |
| 2017-2018 | ▼$37.612 | ▲$67.133 | ▲$15.31 |
| 2018-2019 | ▲$41.53 | ▲$68.103 | ▼$14.98 |

== See also ==
- Economy of Chittagong
- Economy of Dhaka
- List of companies of Bangladesh
- List of government-owned companies of Bangladesh
- List of megaprojects in Bangladesh
- List of Bangladeshi businesspeople
- Taxation in Bangladesh
- Universal Pension
- Bangladesh and the International Monetary Fund
- Bangladesh Academy for Rural Development
- Bangladesh Planning Commission
- Federation of Bangladesh Chambers of Commerce & Industries
- Ministry of Commerce (Bangladesh)
- Ministry of Industries (Bangladesh)
- Ministry of Labour and Employment (Bangladesh)
- Economy of South Asia
- South Asian Free Trade Area
- List of countries by 4G LTE penetration
- List of hartals in Bangladesh
- Corruption in Bangladesh
- Prostitution in Bangladesh
- Crime in Bangladesh
- Human rights in Bangladesh
- Child labour in Bangladesh
- Climate finance in Bangladesh
