= Climate finance in Bangladesh =

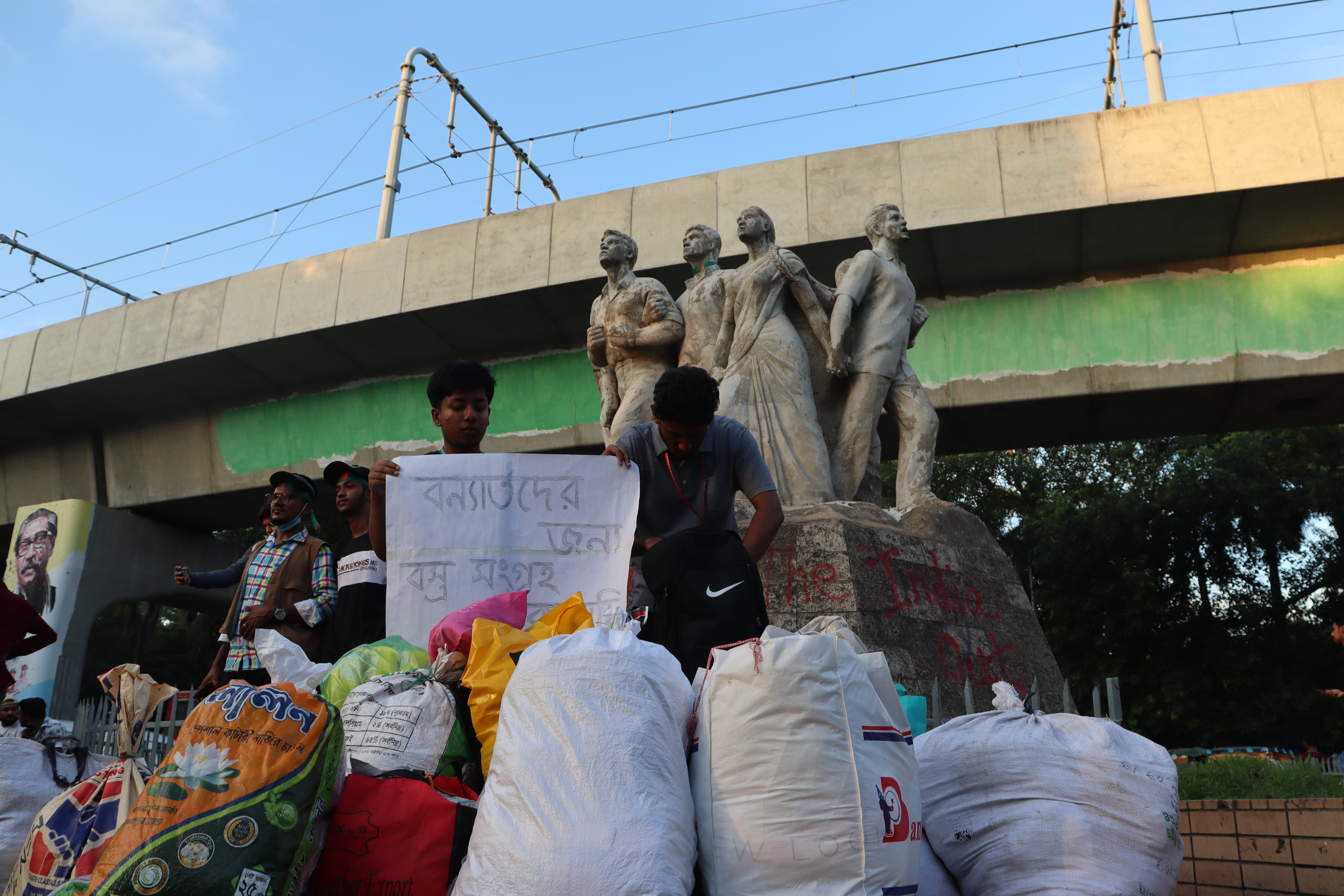
Students of the University of Dhaka assisting in the distribution of humanitarian aid to the victims of the Bangladesh floods in August 2024.

Climate finance in Bangladesh encompasses capital flows mobilized by state agencies and public and private financial institutions to mitigate the effects of climate change and promote adaptation in strategic sectors such as energy, agriculture, and transportation. In 2023, the country saw a 3.64% increase in clean energy investment, reaching US$333.89 million—a figure still far from the estimated US$1.5 to US$1.7 billion annually required to meet its target of 40% renewable electricity by 2041. Domestically, approximately 17.4% of the country's territory, or 2.58 million hectares, is covered by forests, while soil degradation and salinization affect nearly half of agricultural land, reinforcing the urgency of investing in adaptation.

Domestically, the country's green banking framework dates back to 2011, when the Bangladesh Bank required all financial institutions to establish dedicated green finance units. The Sustainable and Renewable Energy Development Authority (SREDA) coordinates policies such as the Renewable Energy Policy (2008), the Energy Efficiency Master Plan (2016), and Net Metering (2018), which have already enabled over 218 MW of rural solar systems and 26 microgrids by 2014. Recent initiatives, such as the Mujib Climate Prosperity Plan and the Grand Railway Plan 2022, project to mobilize up to US$30 billion per year by 2030 to modernize infrastructure and promote the energy transition.

Externally, Bangladesh relies on contributions from multilateral partners and foreign investors. Notable among these is the $430 million solar project with ACWA Power and the use of funds such as the Global Environment Facility - Least Development Countries Fund (GEF-LDCF) and the Green Climate Fund. Furthermore, advances in Islamic finance —via Green Sukuk —and the National Adaptation Plan ($610 million raised by 2023) expand sources of capital.

Still, experts point to imbalances: more than 50% of Bangladesh Climate Change Trust Fund ( BCCTF) resources went to physical infrastructure, while less than 1% financed integrated disaster management, and rising external debt (38% of GDP) raises concerns about fiscal sustainability. Despite this, the country has exceptional solar (up to 240,000 MW) and wind (up to 150,000 MW) potential and is advancing reforms to diversify financing mechanisms and strengthen green governance.

== Climate context and vulnerabilities ==
=== Climatic and forestry context ===
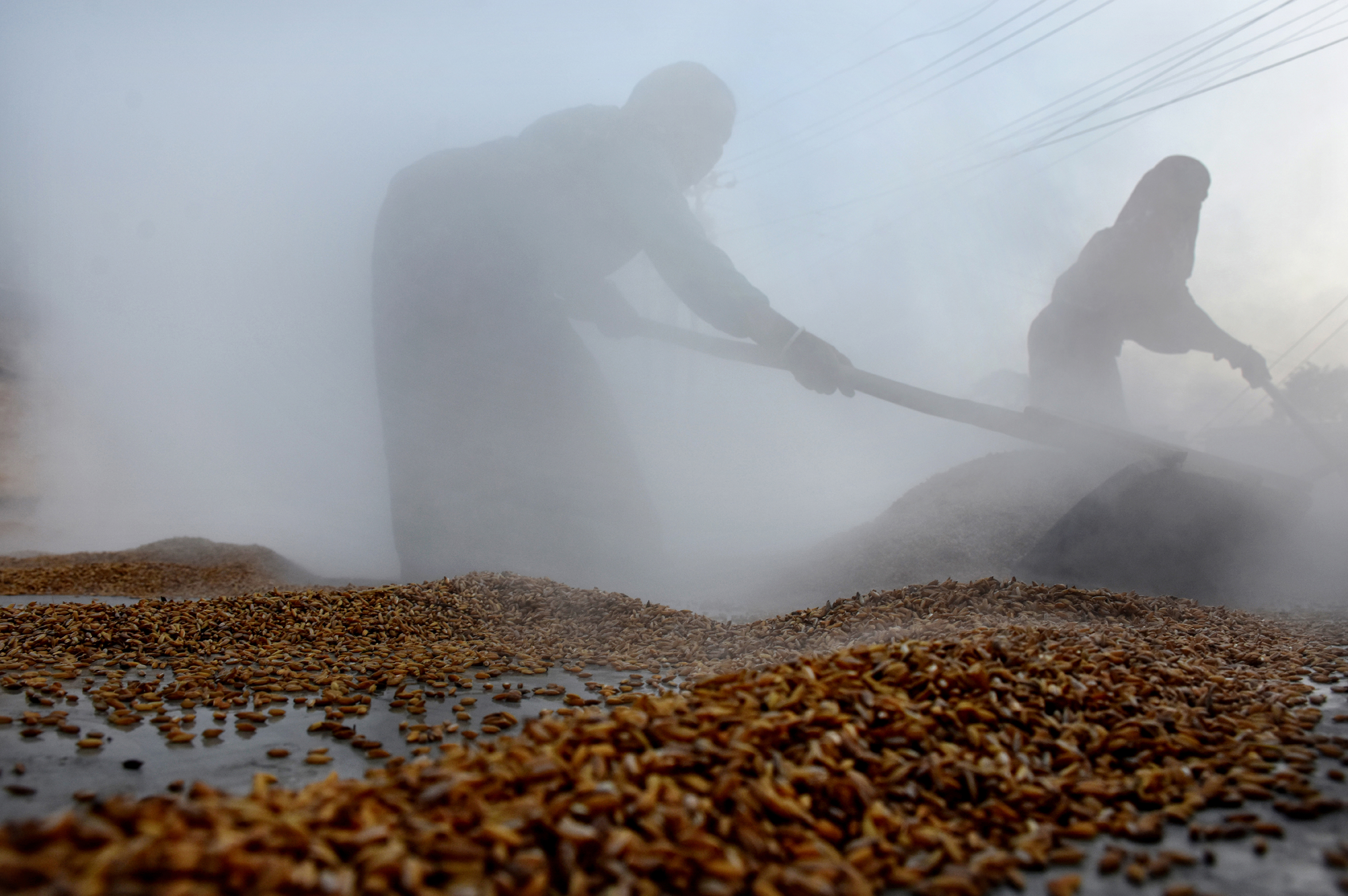
Rice production process in Chittagong.

Bangladesh's total land area is approximately 14.76 million hectares, of which about 2.58 million hectares—or 17.4% of the territory—is covered by forests, including plantations. However, land degradation represents one of the country's major environmental challenges, affecting more than 2 million hectares—approximately 40% of the country's land mass—due to factors such as topsoil erosion, nutrient depletion, acidification, and riverbank collapse. Salinization in coastal regions increased from 0.83 million hectares in 1973 to 1.05 million hectares in 2009, and currently impacts more than 53% of the country's coastal areas.

=== Economic and social context ===
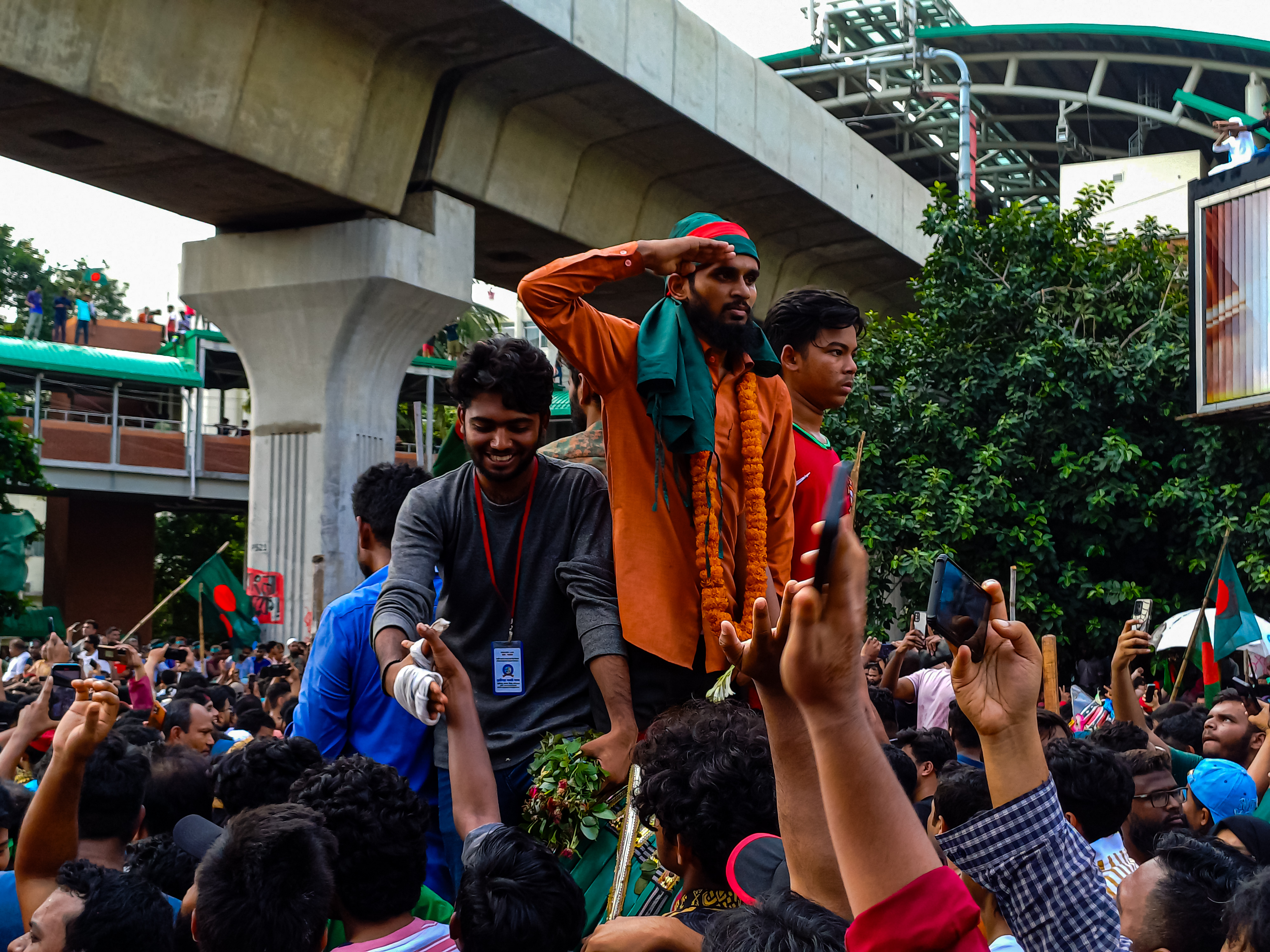
People on the streets celebrating the resignation of former Prime Minister Sheikh Hasina.

In August 2024, the abrupt replacement of the government in Bangladesh jeopardized the advancement of renewable energy by canceling or renegotiating strategic agreements, generating strong uncertainty among investors. Under the leadership of Muhammad Yunus, the interim government has been reviewing energy policy to restore market confidence and accelerate the transition to clean energy. Although the renewable sector recorded unprecedented growth in 2024, continued success now depends on the viability of new projects ready to attract investment in 2025–2026.

Agriculture is a key pillar of Bangladesh's economy, employing 40% of the workforce and contributing 12.5% of GDP. However, the sector faces significant threats from climate change. Projections indicate that by the 2050s, average temperatures will rise by 1.6 °C and annual rainfall will increase by 4%, increasing the incidence of floods, cyclones, and droughts—all of which jeopardize agricultural productivity and soil stability.

Bangladesh's transportation sector, vital to the country's economic growth and connectivity, is increasingly vulnerable to climate-related hazards such as floods, cyclones, coastal erosion, and heat damage—threats that affect roads, railways, bridges, and inland waterways. Rural transportation networks are especially exposed, suffering from landslides, recurrent flooding, and structural weakening caused by extreme weather events and sea-level rise —factors that compromise connectivity and significantly increase maintenance costs.

=== Energy context ===
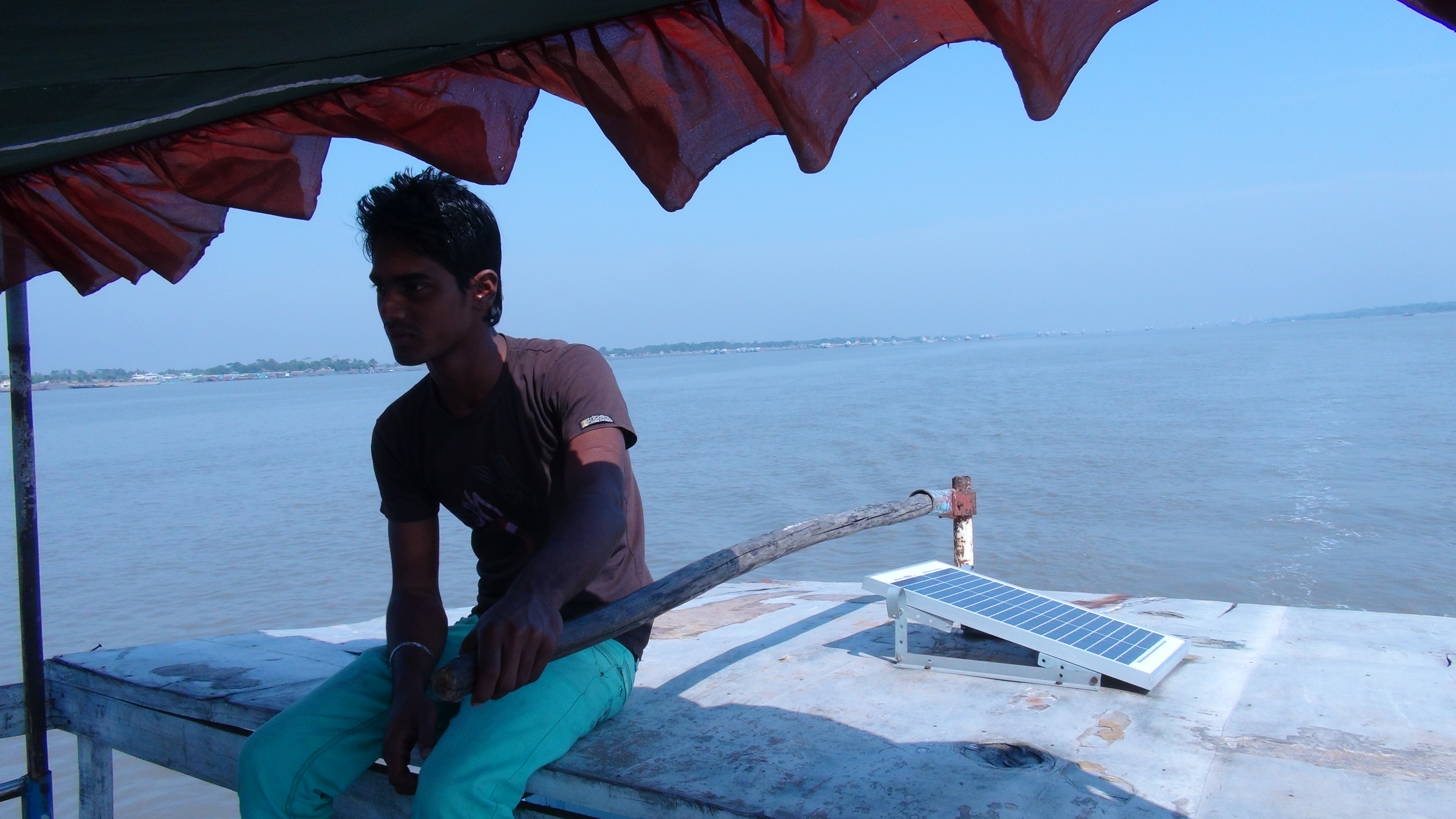
Solar panel on a boat.

Bangladesh's energy supply is dominated by natural gas and petroleum, which together account for about 80% of the total energy supply, while clean renewable sources contribute less than 1%. Solar power leads the renewable sector with approximately 946 MW of installed capacity, and hydropower with 230 MW. Biofuels and waste, including biogas, biodiesel, and ethanol, currently constitute the third-largest segment, contributing approximately 15.5% of the energy mix.

Despite significant progress in expanding electricity generation and energy access, Bangladesh faces challenges due to its heavy dependence on declining natural gas reserves and imported fuels, which poses risks to long-term energy security and economic stability.

In 2023, the average electricity price in Bangladesh was approximately US$0.083 per kWh—lower than the global average of US$0.161 per kWh and very close to the Asian average of US$0.082 per kWh.

Bangladesh's national power grid has an installed capacity of 25,100.1 MW, significantly exceeding the country's peak demand of around 15,648 MW. This overcapacity contributes to annual financial losses estimated at around US$1.2 billion. The integration of smart grid technologies and decentralized renewable sources, such as microgrids, is seen as a promising strategy to increase grid resilience, support rural electrification, and encourage the transition from captive generation to grid supply.

== Legal and institutional frameworks ==
Bangladesh has set ambitious renewable energy targets, aiming for 10% to 15% of its electricity to come from renewable sources by 2030 and 40% by 2041, in line with its sustainable development and climate change commitments. Reaching the 40% target will require an estimated annual investment of between $1.53 billion and $1.71 billion from 2024 to 2041, not including additional costs for grid modernization and energy storage infrastructure.

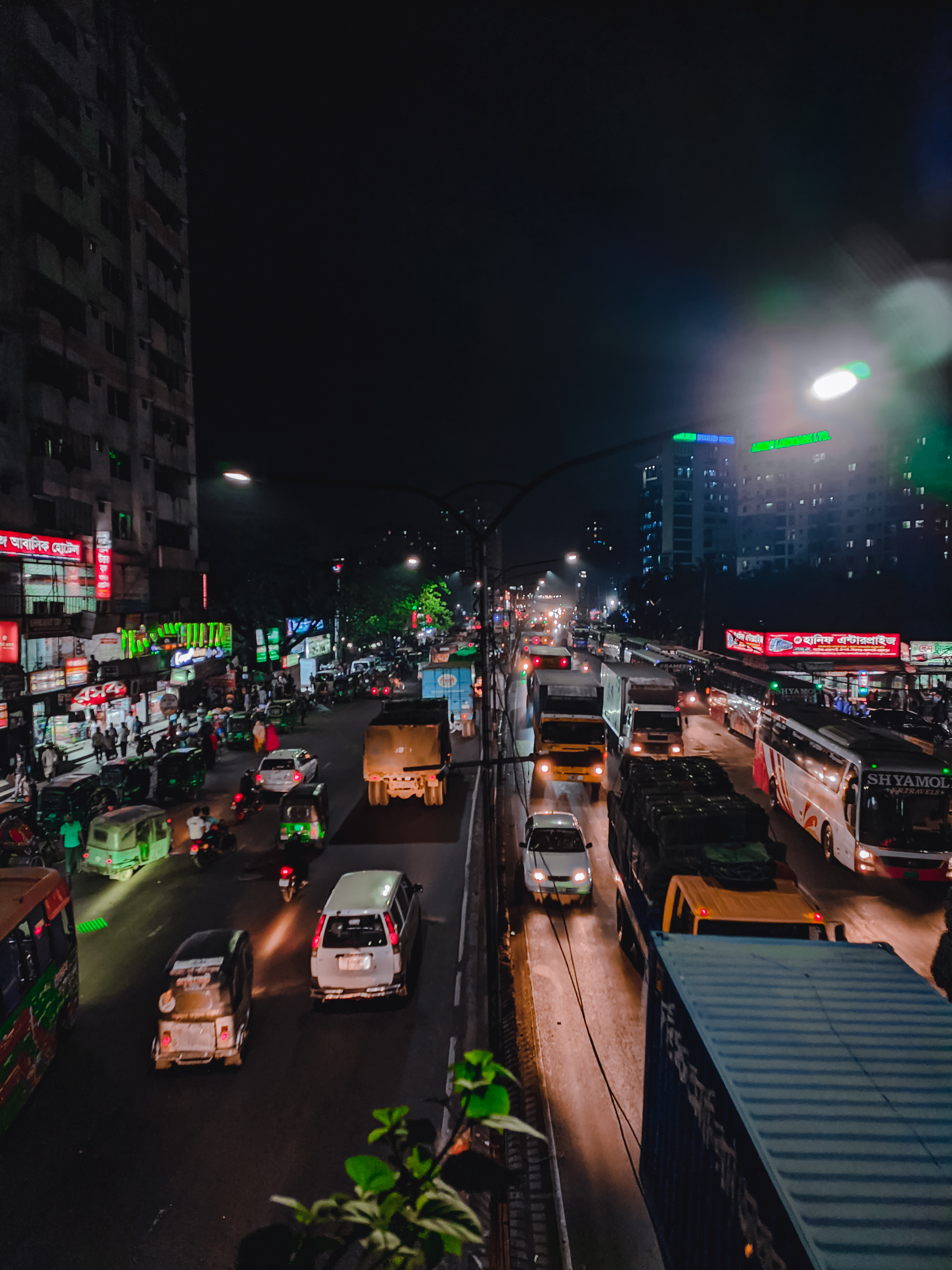
Traffic in Dhaka.

The Sustainable and Renewable Energy Development Authority (SREDA) is the central agency responsible for implementing renewable energy policies in Bangladesh, supporting initiatives such as the Renewable Energy Policy (2008), the Energy Efficiency Master Plan (2016), and the Net Metering Guideline (2018). These policies aim to achieve 10% electricity from renewable sources by 2041, while enabling, through the energy compensation system (Net Metering), consumers to sell up to 70% of the energy generated by their rooftop solar systems back to the grid.

The draft of the 2025 Renewable Energy Policy proposed new incentives, including an exemption from import tariffs for renewable energy-related materials, a 10-year corporate income tax exemption for new projects, a transaction tax exemption, and commitments to the development of battery storage systems.

The Mujib Climate Prosperity Plan, along with the Grand Railway Plan 2022, outlines a 30-year vision to modernize Bangladesh's railway infrastructure, incorporating weather-resistant designs, electrification, and energy-efficient trains. In parallel, it also aims to transform the transportation sector as a whole by promoting the adoption of electric vehicles, electric buses, electric river transport, and mass transit systems, with the aim of reducing emissions and alleviating urban congestion. To enable these transitions, the plan seeks to mobilize up to $30 billion per year by 2030 through domestic and international financing sources.

The 2021 Automotive Industry Development Policy further boosts the adoption of electric vehicles in Bangladesh by offering tax exemptions, import duty exemptions for EV components, and support for battery recycling and charging infrastructure. These measures create a favorable environment for local manufacturing and strengthening supply chains, as demonstrated by the upcoming production of 1 GWh of lithium-ion batteries by Bangladesh Lithium Battery Ltd.

The Bangladesh Investment Development Authority (BIDA) plays a central role in facilitating foreign direct investment, offering a variety of incentives specifically designed to attract investors to sustainability-focused sectors. Key benefits include broad tax breaks—up to 100% for up to 10 years for public-private partnerships —tax-free profit repatriation, and reduced corporate income tax rates for sustainable industries, such as the 10% rate for LEED-certified textile mills and specific incentives for plastic recycling plants.

Special Economic Zones (SEZs) in Bangladesh, administered by the Bangladesh Economic Zones Authority (BEZA), offer significant incentives such as tax exemptions, duty-free imports of capital machinery, and simplified granting of business licenses, with the aim of attracting both domestic and foreign investment.

Bangladesh has been making rapid progress in adopting global climate disclosure and ESG reporting standards. The Bangladesh Stock Exchange now requires companies to include ESG information in their annual reports, and compliance with this requirement increased by 36% between 2018 and 2019—a clear sign of growing corporate engagement with sustainable practices.

The Bangladesh Bank introduced comprehensive green finance guidelines in 2011, aiming to promote sustainability in the country's financial sector. Key guidelines included the development and approval by bank boards of directors of a green finance policy, as well as the establishment of a Green Banking Unit (GBU) within each financial institution to oversee the implementation and enforcement of these guidelines.

== Sustainable manufacturing ==
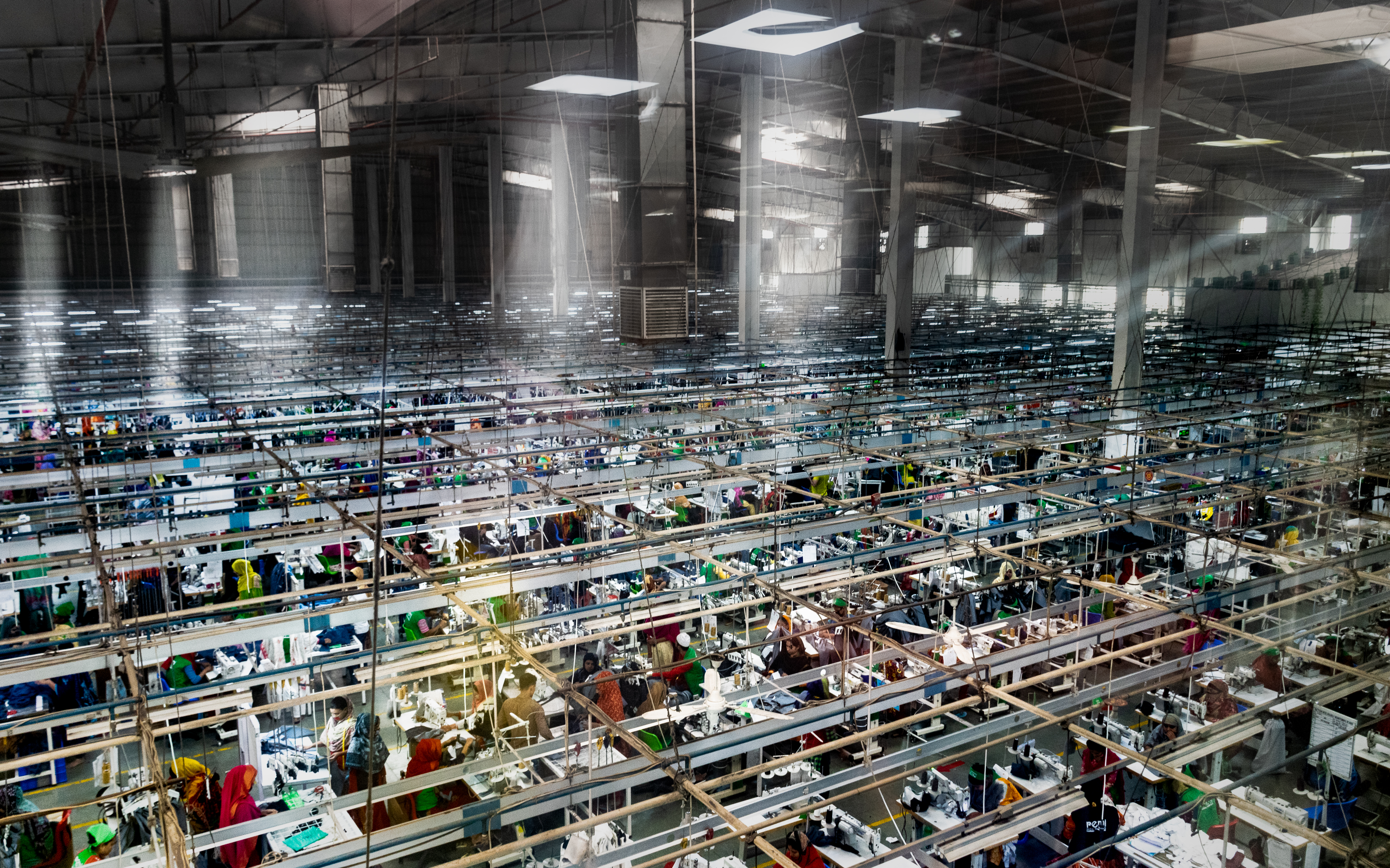
One of the LEED certified textile mills .

Bangladesh has established itself as a global leader in sustainable manufacturing, particularly in the apparel sector, with over 100 LEED- certified factories by 2021—a result of robust government policies, public-private partnerships, technological innovation, and corporate initiatives aligned with environmental and social governance (ESG) principles. Government incentives, such as special tax rates for LEED-certified textile factories and corporate tax breaks for plastic recycling plants, have played a key role in this progress. International buyers have also been putting pressure on apparel manufacturers to adopt environmentally responsible practices, which has further driven the green transition in the sector.

== Public funding ==
Bangladesh has been placing increasing priority on integrating renewable energy sources into its national electricity grid through several major initiatives, such as mandatory net metering for all utilities, a government-run rural rooftop solar program, and the development of solar microgrids.

Net metering allows residential, commercial, and industrial consumers to sell surplus electricity to the grid, with tariffs set by the Bangladesh Energy Regulatory Commission, encouraging the adoption of distributed solar systems. The rural rooftop solar program, launched in 2003 with an investment of $696 million, provided 218 MW of electricity to 18 million people, contributing significantly to improved rural electrification. Furthermore, by 2014, 26 solar microgrids with a total capacity of 5 MW provided electricity access to approximately 16,000 rural residents and reduced CO₂ emissions by 29,300 tons over their lifetime.

In June 2025, the government mandated the installation of solar panels on the roofs of schools, hospitals, and public buildings, a project that promises energy cost savings and extra revenue from leasing space, as well as boosting the distributed generation of clean electricity.

== Private financing ==
The Bangladesh Bank has established a strong green finance framework, offering significant incentives such as a 5 percent refinancing rate for sustainable products—well below the average market rate of around 15 percent—to encourage investment in environmentally responsible projects.

In 2023, local banks and non-banking financial institutions (NBFIs) invested Tk 742 crore in renewable energy projects, a 62% increase from 2021, although it still represents only 3.6% of the estimated amount needed to meet the 40% renewable energy target by 2040.

From 2014 to 2019, private commercial banks (PCBs) accounted for 74.2% of the total green financing disbursed in the country. During this period, the main destination of resources was solid and liquid waste management (32.37%), followed by the manufacture of ecological bricks (18.52%), "green" establishments (15.18%), and recycling (11.16%).

In the capital markets, Standard Chartered Bank originated the first local green bond in Bangladesh and issued the first sustainable letter of credit, paving the way for private equity funding for projects such as large-scale solar plants and credit lines for clean energy solutions.

Through Bangladesh’s recently launched National Adaptation Plan, approximately US$610 million has been mobilized for nine private sector projects by the end of 2023. Of this total, US$135.5 million came from local private banks and other national entities, alongside guaranteed contributions from multilateral agencies such as Multilateral Investment Guarantee Agency (MIGA), which reduce the risk of investing in renewable energy.

== International cooperation and external financing ==
Bangladesh actively encourages foreign investment in the renewable energy sector, opening up promising opportunities for sustainable growth. One example is the landmark $430 million partnership between ACWA Power (Saudi Arabia) and the Bangladesh Energy Development Board to implement a utility-scale solar project.

Since the 1970s, Bangladesh has established over 200,000 hectares of coastal green belts—primarily with mangrove plantations —to protect vulnerable coastal regions against cyclones, high tides, and erosion, with support from international funds such as the Global Environment Facility Least Developed Countries Fund (GEF-LDCF).

Approved in October 2023, Bangladesh's National Adaptation Plan emphasizes sustainable land use, with measures such as reforestation, soil restoration, land zoning, and adaptive agricultural practices. With funding from the Green Climate Fund and alignment with multi-billion-dollar programs such as the Climate-Smart Agriculture Enhancement Plan, the plan strengthens local climate planning and enables investments in resilient land management.

The 2019 Bangladesh Climate-Smart Agriculture Improvement Plan (CSAIP) envisages approximately US$809 million in World Bank investments aimed at modernizing irrigation, flood control, introducing drought-resistant crops, and promoting low-emission agricultural practices. The goal is to increase productivity, strengthen adaptation, and contribute to climate change mitigation. The proposal highlights the need for stronger institutional coordination, involving multiple ministries and local governments, to integrate climate-smart agriculture (CSA) into national and local planning.

Islamic finance in Bangladesh is expanding rapidly, driven by strong demand for Shariah - compliant financial services and a majority Muslim population. The sector, valued at approximately US$50 billion in 2020, has been gaining a growing share of both the overall financial market and the remittance segment. Between April and June 2022, Islamic banks accounted for 32% of total remittances received in the country. Islamic finance in Bangladesh operates under central bank guidelines and is characterized by the development of innovative products, such as Green Sukuk — Shariah-compliant green bonds that aim to mobilize capital for sustainable development.

== Main sectors benefited ==
Clean energy investment in Bangladesh grew by 3.64%, from $322.17 million in 2022 to $333.89 million in 2023. However, this amount still represents only a fraction of the estimated $1.53 to $1.71 billion annually needed for the country to reach its national target of 40% renewable energy capacity.

In the fiscal budget 2023–24, the allocation for the development of climate-resilient cropping systems reached 35,374 crore taka (c. 2.9 billion US dollars). By July 2023, over 45,000 crore had been effectively invested in the agriculture sector, of which 30,200 crore came from the government and the rest from development partners.

Bangladeshi financial institutions mobilize about $1.1 billion a year in green finance products, boosting renewable energy, wastewater treatment, and biogas projects, with the Green Transformation Fund in the textile and tanning sector being a highlight.

== Impacts and results ==
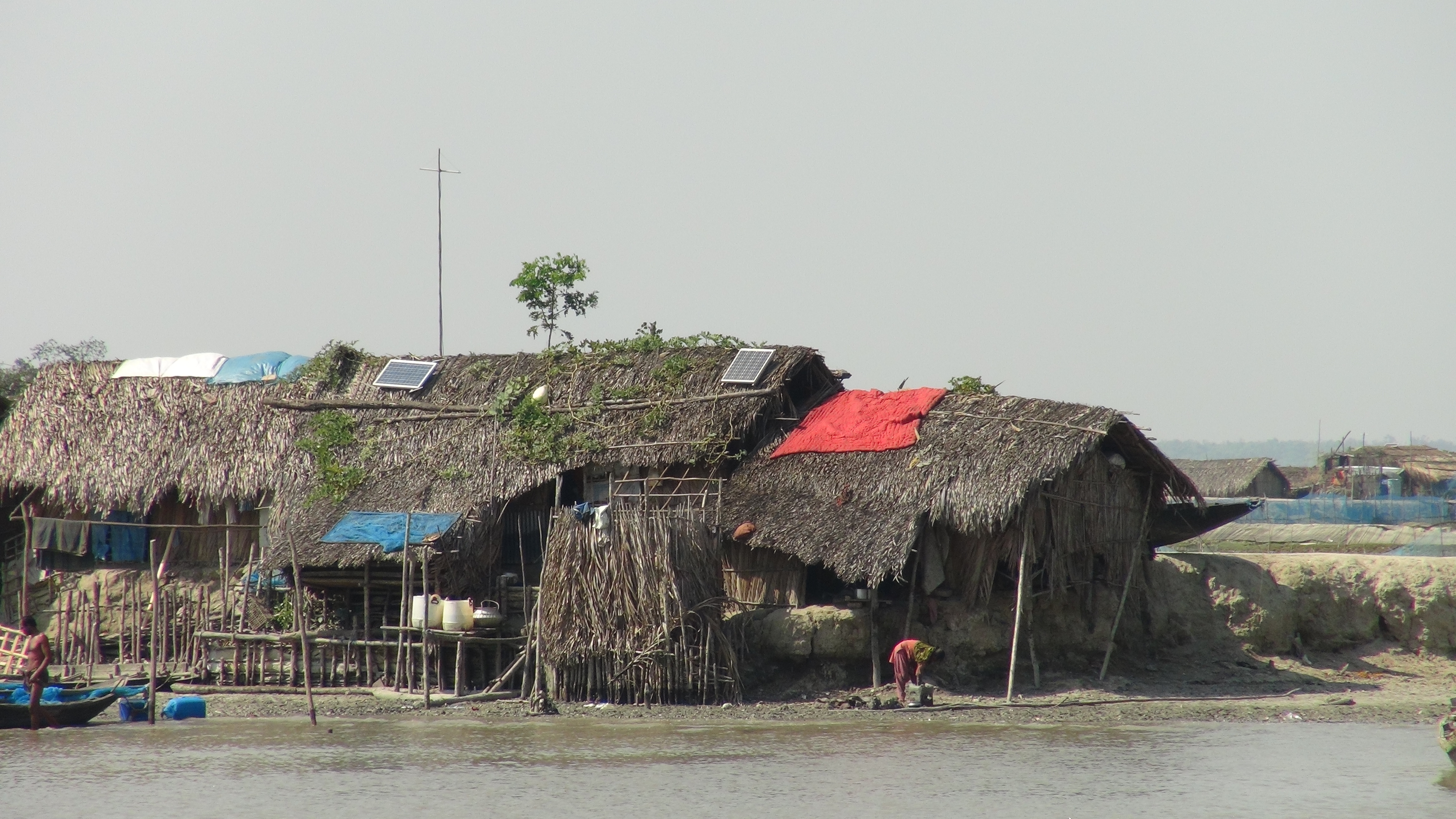
Solar panels on a rural house.

The Solar Home Systems (SHS) program, launched in 2003 by the state-owned Infrastructure Development Company Limited (IDCOL), was a transformative initiative for the electrification of off-grid rural areas in Bangladesh, where expanding conventional electricity infrastructure is often unfeasible or prohibitively expensive. As of January 2019, the program had installed more than 4 million SHS, providing clean electricity to about 18 million people and reaching a total capacity of around 220 MW.

By October 2023, more than 6 million solar home systems had been installed, providing clean electricity to about 12% of the population.

The Local Government Initiative for Climate Change (LoGIC) has benefited nearly two million people in nine vulnerable districts, reaching more than 400,000 households by strengthening community and institutional capacity to plan and finance adaptation actions and diversify livelihoods.

== Criticism and controversies ==
Experts at the Dhaka Tribune report that the Bangladesh Climate Change Trust Fund (BCCTF) has systematically prioritized infrastructure projects over measures aimed at slow-moving events such as drought and salinity. Between the 2009–10 and 2022–23 fiscal years, 50.89 percent of the funds (Taka 2,095.41 crore) were invested in physical projects—roads, embankments, and shelters—while only 0.89 percent (Taka 32.24 crore) financed 'integrated disaster management,' a sector that includes agricultural adaptation measures to drought and salinity. According to experts, this imbalance exacerbates rural vulnerabilities and reduces the effectiveness of climate adaptation policies.

Economist Zakir Hossain warns of the risk of a debt trap created by multilateral bank loans. In 2023, the Asian Development Bank (ADB) allocated 53% of its $1.9 billion in adaptation loans, and the World Bank provided $1 billion in Policy Credits structured as loans. With external debt close to 38% of GDP, these loans burden the national budget, diverting resources from social services and essential infrastructure.

== Future prospects ==
Bangladesh has exceptionally high solar potential, with national solar irradiance levels comparable to those of major renewable energy markets and an estimated technical potential of between 191,000 and 240,000 MW—a figure that exceeds the country's projected 2041 electricity demand of 50,000 MW by nearly four to five times. Average daily solar energy availability in Bangladesh ranges from 4 to 6.5 kWh/m², with peak irradiance occurring between March and October, making solar power a highly viable option for large-scale deployment. Despite the benefits for efficient heating and cooling, heat pump adoption in the country has been limited—peaking in 2013 and remaining stagnant until 2024.

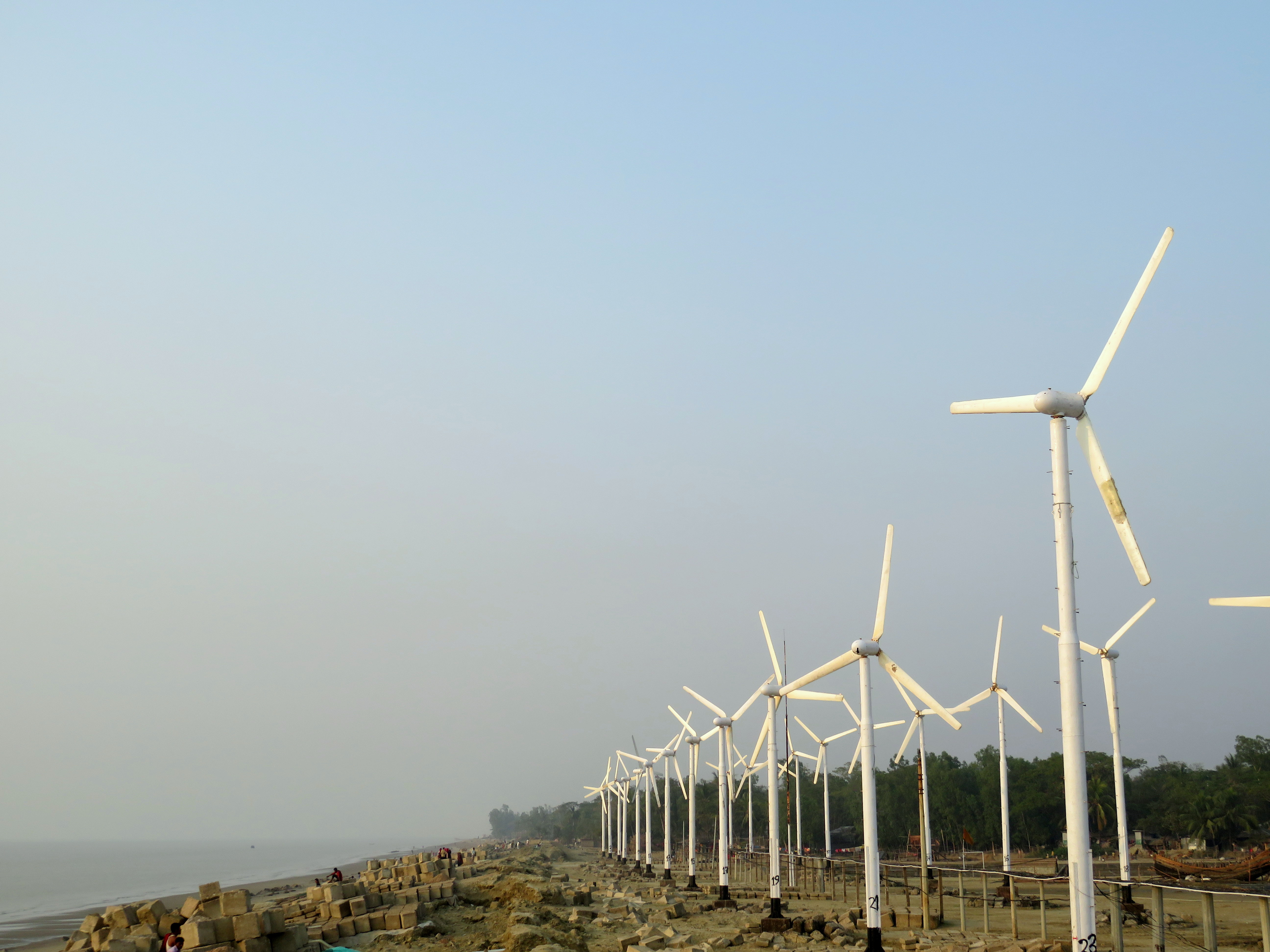
Wind farm, Cox's Bazar.

Bangladesh has significant potential for wind power, especially along its 725 km (450 mi) coastline, where average wind speeds range from 4.1 to 7.5 m/s—levels comparable to those in wind markets in early stages of development. Estimates indicate that the country could harness between 30,000 and 150,000 MW of wind power, which would be enough to supply 60% to 300% of the projected electricity demand of 50,000 MW by 2041.

The Institute for Energy Economics and Financial Analysis (IEEFA) recommends several strategic policy improvements to strengthen Bangladesh's energy transition. First, it is crucial to align national energy policy with climate goals, ensuring that energy sector development is aligned with both environmental sustainability and the country's international obligations. Second, it is crucial to diversify financing sources through mechanisms such as blended finance, green bonds, and private investment—especially given the scarcity of minerals critical to renewable energy supply chains in Bangladesh. Mapping available resources and attracting different types of capital can help bridge investment gaps. Third, it is crucial to strengthen institutional capacity—especially in agencies such as the Sustainable and Renewable Energy Development Authority (SREDA)—to implement advanced tools such as reverse auctions, battery storage systems, and robust project appraisal frameworks.

== See also ==
- Climate finance in Indonesia
