= Climate finance in Indonesia =

Financial resources

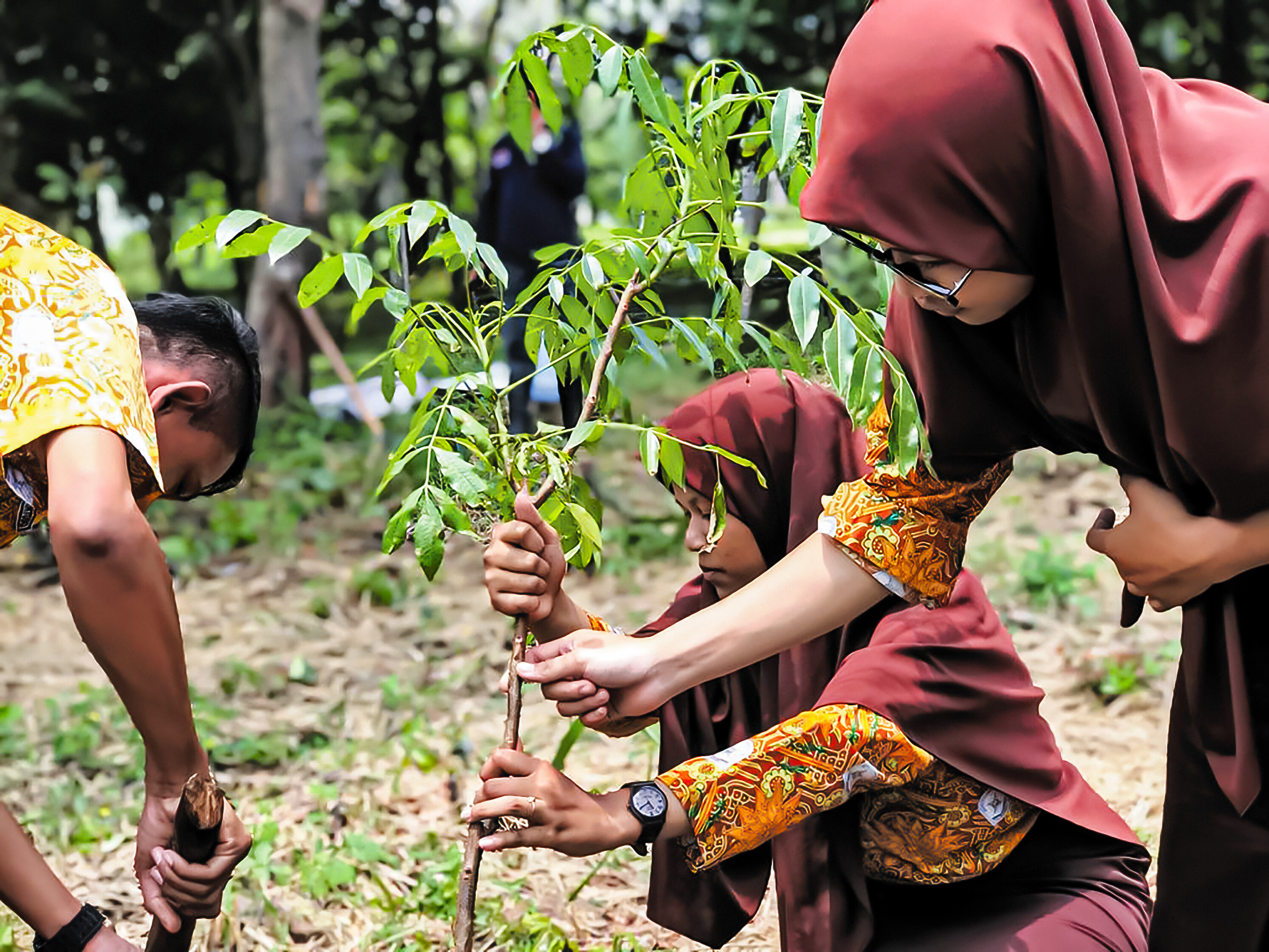
Students in East Java province planting trees as part of Earth Day 2022.

Climate finance in Indonesia refers to financial resources earmarked to support climate change mitigation and adaptation actions in the country. As the fifth largest emitter of greenhouse gases in the world, a position attributed mainly to deforestation (loss of 60,000 km² of primary forests between 2000 and 2012) and dependence on fossil fuels (85% of the energy matrix in 2023), Indonesia is simultaneously a key actor in the global climate crisis and one of the countries most vulnerable to its impacts, such as rising sea levels and intensifying natural disasters.

Financing mechanisms range from international standards such as REDD+ and carbon markets to innovative instruments such as green sukuk (Islamic green bonds) and green waqf (religious conservation endowments). However, historical challenges – such as land centralization inherited from the colonial period, conflicts between customary rights (adat) and state legislation, and subsidies to polluting sectors – complicate the efficient allocation of resources. Between 2011 and 2023, the country raised US$78 billion for energy transition and forest conservation, but critics point to gaps in governance and equitable distribution of benefits.

== Climatic and economic context ==
Indonesia, an archipelago of over 17,000 islands and the fourth most populous country in the world, faces a complex scenario in terms of economic growth and the climate crisis, marked by a development model based on the intensive exploitation of natural resources. The accelerated degradation of tropical forests and the expansion of the palm oil sector have generated serious socio-environmental impacts, while the energy sector, heavily dependent on fossil fuels, currently represents the country's main source of emissions.

Despite international commitments and the potential for renewable sources, structural barriers, coal subsidies, and fragmented policies are hindering the transition to a low-carbon economy, given the growing energy demand and climate pressures. With a population expected to exceed 300 million by 2030 and rapid urbanization, the country is experiencing rising energy consumption and greenhouse gas emissions.

== Forest ==
Indonesia’s forest cover, the world’s third-largest tropical biome, faces historical pressures linked to commodity-based economic models and faces complex challenges at the intersection of forest conservation and economic development. In 1900, forests covered 84% of the country’s territory, but by 1950, historical estimates had shown that 145 million hectares of primary forest and 14 million hectares of secondary forest and mangroves remained. From the 1970s onwards, logging gained industrial scale, boosting sectors such as pulp and paper. Between 1980 and 2000, the productive capacity of these industries grew by 700%, elevating Indonesia to ninth place among the world’s largest pulp producers.

The acceleration of deforestation became critical in the following decades: between 1990 and 2000, the country lost 24 million hectares of forests (20% of the total coverage), leaving 94 million hectares (52% of the territory) in 2010.

Despite a moratorium on new deforestation concessions instituted in 2011, poor oversight and corruption have maintained high rates, with a peak of 930,000 hectares deforested in 2016. Between 2000 and 2012, the country lost approximately 60,000 km² of primary forest, surpassing Brazil in annual deforestation rate in 2012 (8,400 km² versus 4,600 km²), driven mainly by the expansion of oil palm plantations.

The main drivers of deforestation (2001–2016) include the expansion of palm oil (23% of the total), responsible for the direct conversion of 3.3 million hectares of forests, and the transformation of areas into pastures or savannahs (20%), often associated with illegal fires. Small-scale agriculture and logging infrastructure, such as roads and clearings, contributed 22% and 10%, respectively, while activities such as mining – especially nickel mining on the island of Sulawesi, driven by global demand for batteries – accounted for 5%.

Despite these impacts, the palm oil and timber sectors together generate around $45 billion in export revenues per year for Indonesia.

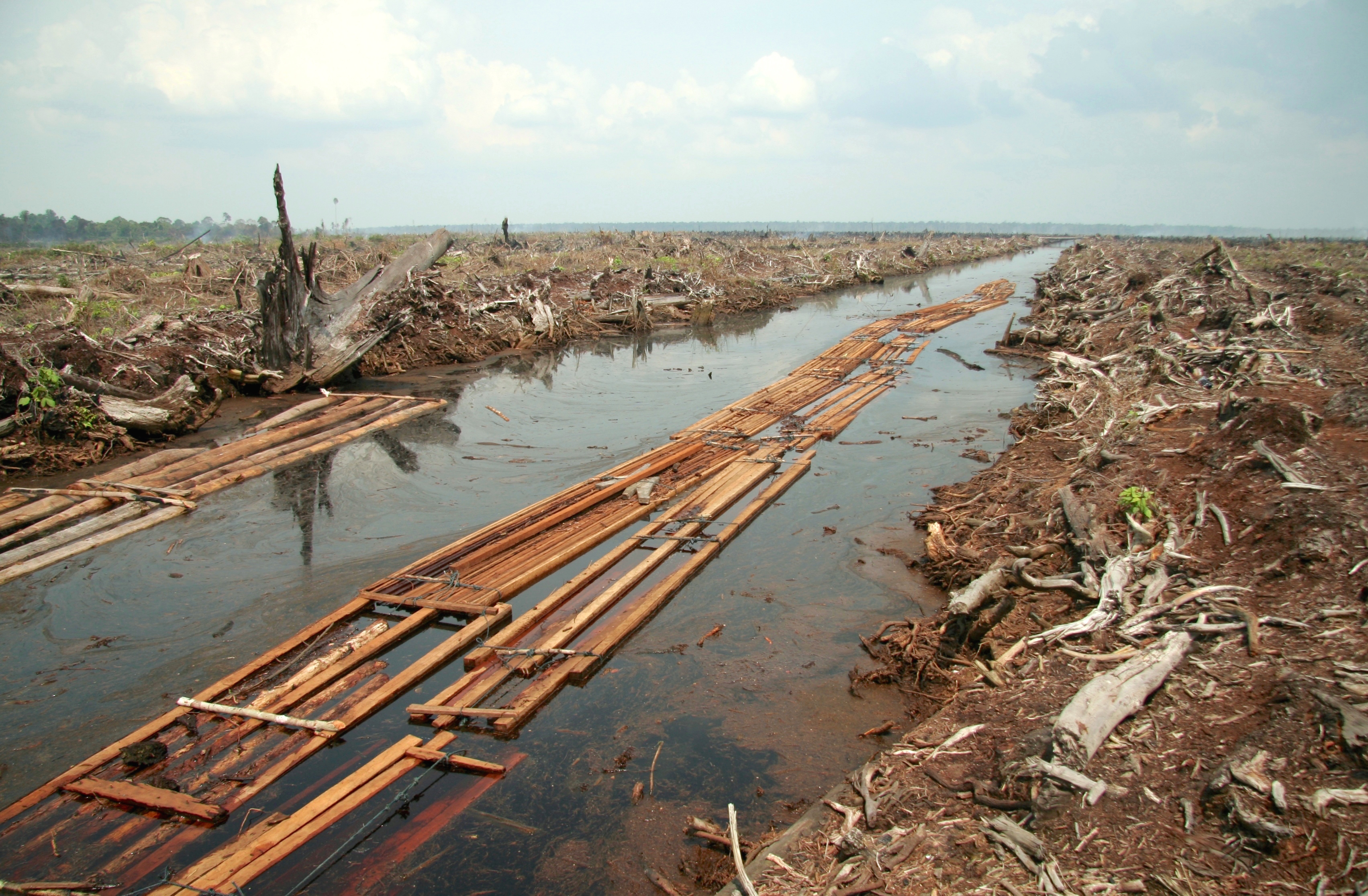
Deforestation of a peat forest for oil palm plantations.

Indonesia is the world's largest producer of palm oil, which is the main raw material for its biodiesel. Logging and oil palm plantations have driven economic growth, but at the same time, they cause large-scale deforestation.

Currently, only 49% of the country's territory is covered by forests, compared to a historical estimate of 84%. Between 2001 and 2016, oil palm plantations were responsible for 23% of this deforestation.

The expansion of oil palm monocultures in Indonesia, often associated with the replacement of existing tropical forests or agricultural areas, has intensified environmental and social pressures during the late 20th and early 21st centuries. It is estimated that up to 80% of deforestation linked to the sector – responsible for the loss of 840,000 hectares of primary forest annually between 2000 and 2012 – occurs illegally.

The destruction of peatlands, which capture up to 20 times more carbon than unflooded tropical forests, amplifies carbon dioxide emissions: illegal land-clearing fires released between 0.81 and 2.57 billion tonnes of carbon in 1997, equivalent to 13–40% of global fossil fuel emissions that year.

Environmental degradation extends to soils and water resources: each ton of palm oil produced generates 2.5 tons of toxic effluents, contaminating aquatic ecosystems. The intensive use of agrochemicals, such as pesticides and fertilizers, combined with erosion on steep slopes (common in plantations), aggravates flooding and river silting, threatening local infrastructure.

Biodiversity loss is critical, with endemic species such as orangutans, Sumatran tigers and pygmy elephants, threatened by fires and habitat fragmentation.

At the socioeconomic level, although the palm oil sector employs 16 million people and represents around 4.5% of gross domestic product (GDP), indigenous communities, such as the Dayak in the Kalimantan region, face forced displacement and land conflicts: more than 630 territorial disputes linked to plantations were recorded by 2010.

Public health is compromised by air pollution – in 2015, transboundary haze (Southeast Asian Haze) contributed to 103,300 premature deaths in the region. In addition, a 2016 complaint by Amnesty International claimed that workers at the company Wilmar International had suffered serious health damage as a result of applying herbicides such as paraquat, banned in Europe but still used on oil palm plantations, without adequate protective equipment. Women and children are particularly vulnerable to these risks: minors work informally to help parents with production targets, while women, often hired without social benefits, handle toxic chemicals.

== Energy and emissions ==
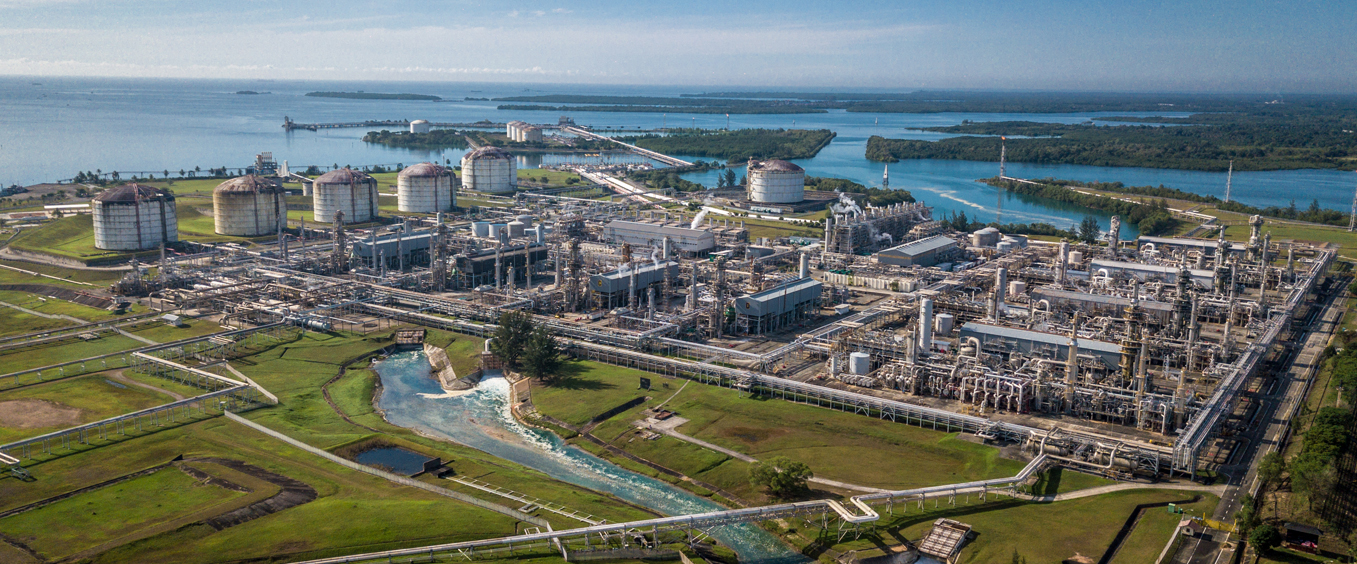
Badak LNG company's natural gas plant in Bontang cCty on the island of Borneo.

The energy sector is central to the Indonesian climate debate. Despite having abundant renewable resources such as geothermal energy, hydropower, and biofuels its energy mix still relies on 85% fossil fuels, especially coal and natural gas.

The energy sector is estimated to account for 50% to 70% of national emissions by 2030, surpassing deforestation. The growth in demand for electricity, driven by industrialization and urbanization, tends to consolidate coal-based infrastructures, generating risks of "stranded assets" in a global decarbonization scenario. The International Renewable Energy Agency (IRENA) warns that, without urgent policies, energy demand will increase by 80% by 2030, locking the country into polluting and economically obsolete technologies.

Following the Paris Agreement, the Indonesian government set ambitious targets for its nationally determined contribution, including reducing greenhouse gas emissions by 29% by 2030 (or 41% with international support) and increasing the share of renewable energy to 31% of its primary energy mix by 2050. However, challenges such as historical fossil fuel subsidies, inconsistent policies, monopolistic structures in the energy sector, and lack of transparency in costs make it difficult to achieve these goals. Studies indicate that an economically viable green transition is possible, but requires significant investment: projections indicate the need for up to US$78 billion in investment by 2030 to modernize the electricity grids of Java and Sumatra, regions that concentrate 70% of national generation.

Because Indonesia is made up of 17,508 islands, the country does not yet have a fully interconnected electrical grid. Many islands rely on isolated systems to generate power, which are distributed across several zones. The country intends to modernize its entire grid structure, expanding capacity and including the expansion of renewable sources, in addition to connecting the islands to each other. To implement these changes, the government claims that more than 20 billion US dollars are needed.

By 2023, the country's total carbon dioxide (CO_{2}) emissions reached an estimated 1.2 billion metric tons. The main source of these emissions is the power sector, with coal-fired power plants accounting for over 60% of electricity generation. Other major contributors include deforestation, land-use changes caused by the expansion of palm oil cultivation, and industrial activities.

To reduce these emissions and meet its climate goals, the Indonesian government has promised not to approve new coal-fired power plants. Companies that invest in Carbon Capture, renewable energy, or forest conservation projects can sell carbon credits on Indonesia's regulated market.

The transport sector in Indonesia generates an estimated 150 million metric tons of CO_{2} per year, which is equivalent to almost a quarter of the country's total emissions. Road transport (cars, buses, trucks, and motorbikes) accounts for 90% of these emissions in the sector. Although public transport exists and is expanding, 72% of Indonesians still rely on private transport. In Jakarta, TransJakarta BRT is one of the largest bus rapid transit systems, serving over 1 million passengers daily. In 2023, the Jakarta–Bandung high-speed rail, the first of its kind in Southeast Asia, was inaugurated, aiming to reduce travel times and associated emissions.

Indonesia has set ambitious targets to reach 75% clean energy by 2040. The geothermal and hydropower sectors are seen as key to achieving this goal. The government and state-owned electricity company Perusahaan Listrik Negara (PLN) have issued new regulations and created funds to support this growth. PLN has also recognized the importance of private sector participation and has outlined plans for collaboration. It is estimated that $154 billion will be needed to meet climate targets. Currently, installed clean energy capacity represents only 12% of the total. In 2023, clean energy investment in Indonesia reached an estimated $497.99 million, an increase of 78% compared to 2022 ($279.93 million).

Indonesia has a large untapped renewable energy potential, estimated to reach around 3,500 GW. The greatest promise lies in geothermal and hydropower. For hydropower, the potential is approximately 94.3 GW. In geothermal, it is estimated to be around 28.5 GW. Solar energy is also very promising, with a national average Global Horizontal Irradiance Index of 4.8 kWh/m², reaching over 5.6 kWh/m² in some southern regions of the country.

The energy transition faces structural obstacles, such as the lack of a wholesale electricity market, uncompetitive tariffs for renewables and cross-subsidies to fossil fuels. The monopoly of the state-owned PLN as the sole energy buyer discourages independent producers, while restrictive financial regulations limit credit lines for large-scale projects. In addition, the lack of transparent data on costs and returns increases risk aversion among investors.

Experts point out that harmonizing policies across ministries, creating carbon credit markets and reducing subsidies for polluting energy are critical measures to unlock investment. Without urgent action, World Bank projections indicate that climate change could reduce Indonesia’s GDP by up to 7% by 2100, with severe impacts on health and the environment.

== History ==
=== Pre-Colonial Period ===
Before European colonization, the relationship between local communities and forests was governed by systems of reciprocity and sustainable use, based on animist worldviews. However, different communities and local leaders already regulated the use of forests, land and their products, and established community management standards that today influence debates on indigenous rights in REDD+ projects.

Human settlement of the region dates back at least 1.5 million years, with successive occupations by migrating populations, including the Austronesians, who probably arrived around 2000 BC.

From 1000 BC onwards, many of these communities adopted the Đông Sơn culture, marked by irrigated rice cultivation, buffalo rituals and megalithic practices. Rice cultivation, especially in Java, fostered the emergence of villages, kingdoms and religions, supported by relatively complex societies. Over the centuries, great centers of power emerged, such as the Srivijaya Empire (Sumatra), the Sailendra Dynasty (Java) and, later, the Majapaït Empire, which achieved great regional influence in the 14th century.

The structure of these kingdoms was strongly centralized. Land rights were tied to agricultural practice, not to formal ownership. The daily lives of most peasants were marked by monsoon cycles and the constant risk of famine. However, these societies also depended on trade in forest products from mountainous regions, such as resin, timber, and wax, establishing an interdependence between coastal and inland areas.

The nomadic populations of the highlands—hunters and practitioners of shifting agriculture—were generally not integrated into state systems. Unlike mainland Southeast Asia, where dominant ethnicities had established themselves, pre-colonial Indonesia was characterized by great ethnic and linguistic diversity, with very strong local identities.

In Sulawesi, there are records of human occupation for at least 40,000 years. In the 14th century, Islam began to spread in the region, gaining strength with the Islamization of the Kingdom of Gowa in the 17th century. However, mountain communities such as those in the center of the island remained on the margins of states and universal religions until the arrival of Dutch missionaries in the 20th century. These populations maintained mobile agricultural practices and identities deeply tied to their ancestral land, which contributes to disputes over territory and resources to this day.

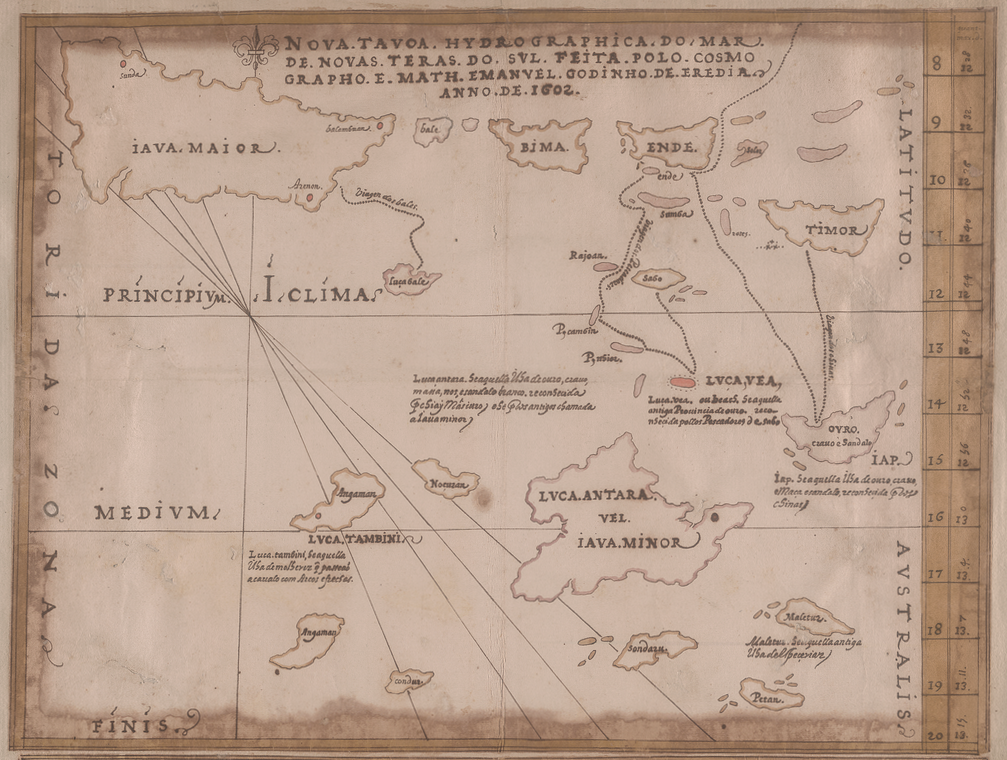
Map of Southeast Asia, made in 1602 by Malay-Portuguese cartographer Emanuel Godinho de Eredia.

Europeans arrived in the Indonesian archipelago in the early 16th century as seafaring traders in search of spices such as nutmeg, cloves, and pepper. European colonization occurred gradually over 300–350 years. The Portuguese were the first to establish trading posts and fortresses on islands such as Ternate and Amboíno, following their conquest of Malacca in 1512. However, by the end of the 16th century, their focus had shifted to other regions, such as Brazil and Macau.

In the 17th century, the Dutch and British increased their presence, with the Dutch East India Company seeking to monopolize the spice trade. Competition led the British to focus on the Indian subcontinent, while the Dutch consolidated their control over agricultural production and timber extraction in the archipelago. In the 17th century, the Dutch East India Company initiated formal environmental management policies, focusing on timber extraction.

Deforestation for tobacco planting on the coast of Sumatra Island, 1898.

In 1808, the colonial government declared all non-private forests to be state property, subordinate to the governor-general. In the 19th century, the logic of forest conservation to protect watersheds and agricultural irrigation led to the creation of regulations such as the Boschordonatie (1865), which restricted shifting cultivation and centralized control over the forests of Java and Madura. The Agrarische Wet (1870) introduced Western concepts of private property, allowing the leasing of land for plantations. These laws displaced customary(adat) systems of land tenure, especially in the inner islands, although local practices persisted in Sumatra, Borneo, and Papua.

In Sulawesi, colonial control remained limited until the 19th century. The Treaty of Bongaya (1667) transferred coastal Sulawesi to the Dutch, but the interior region retained autonomy until the early 20th century, when local conflicts led to Dutch intervention. The incorporation of areas such as Dampelas into the colonial system resulted in the loss of indigenous forest rights, replaced by state management.

=== Republic of Indonesia ===
A Dutch newsreel from December 1960, showing logging in the Baliem Valley, West New Guinea and the situation of the Papuan populations in that territory.

After independence in 1949, President Sukarno maintained centralized administrative structures inherited from colonialism, including environmental policies. The vision of a unitary state faced resistance in outer islands such as Sumatra and Sulawesi, where separatist movements and demands for an Islamic theocratic state challenged the government in Jakarta. The adoption of Bahasa Indonesia as the national language and the Pancasila ideology sought to unify ethnic and religious diversity, but historical tensions between indigenous communities and state policies persisted, influencing modern conflicts over environmental management and conservation projects such as REDD+.

The early years of the Republic of Indonesia were marked by political instability, with five prime ministers between 1950 and 1955 and 28 parties in the 1955 elections. The election results reflected deep divisions: the Nationalist Party won 22% of the vote, while Islamic parties (Masjumi and Nahdatul Ulama) won 39%. In this context, President Sukarno proposed in 1956 a "guided democracy", distancing himself from the Western liberal model. In 1957, faced with separatist rebellions in Sumatra and with military support, he declared martial law and strengthened presidential powers through a constitutional revision.

In Central Sulawesi, the population faced conflict between separatist movements: the Protestant Permesta Rebellion in the north and the Islamic Darul Islam movement in the south. The dispatch of Kahar Muzakkar, a Bugis leader, to mediate peace resulted in his joining the Islamic rebels, who attacked animist and Christian villages, causing hundreds of deaths. The Permesta Rebellion, although suppressed in 1957, left lasting ethno-religious tensions.

In forest management, colonial regulations remained in force until the 1950s. In 1957, a presidential regulation granted provinces the authority to issue logging concessions of up to 10,000 hectares, generating local revenues but without resolving overlaps between customary rights (adat) and formal legislation. The Basic Agrarian Law of 1960, still in force, sought to harmonize these regulations, granting land a social function and redistribution, but failed to resolve land conflicts, especially in the outer islands.

=== Suharto's New Order ===
The consolidation of military power under Suharto, following the failed 1965 coup, resulted in the persecution of the Communist Party (PKI), with estimates of 300,000 to 1 million deaths. The transition to the "New Order" centralized the state, with the Golkar party dominating rigged elections between 1971 and 1993.

The 1967 Basic Forestry Law redefined 70 percent of the territory as "state forest", subordinating customary lands to the control of the Ministry of Agriculture (later the Ministry of Forestry). Intensive exploitation policies, including illegal logging, financed clientelistic networks, benefiting the Suharto family and allies, especially in the palm oil industry.

The transmigration program, inherited from the colonial period, relocated 5 million Javanese and Balinese to outer islands between 1975 and 1989, under the justification of population balance but aimed at political control. In Central Sulawesi, conflicts between migrants and local communities exploded in the 1990s, with the destruction of thousands of homes and the displacement of 70,000 people.

=== Reforms and contemporary challenges ===
Suharto's resignation in 1998, following economic crises and protests, initiated the reformasi era, with partial decentralization of political power through reforms. However, the resumption of central control over forests in 2002, pressured by timber conglomerates, maintained tensions. Forest Law 31/1999 maintained customary forests as state property, while indigenous movements demanded full recognition of adat territories.

Post-Suharto governments, such as those of Megawati Sukarnoputri (2001–2004) and Susilo Bambang Yudhoyono (2004–2014), faced corruption and political fragmentation. Joko Widodo's election in 2014 promised reforms, but criticism persisted over concessions to economic elites.

== Public funding ==
In 2015, Indonesia became the first country to implement a Climate Budget Tagging system to track climate spending, identifying US$951 million in climate-specific finance in 2011. Of this, 66% came from national budgets, mostly directed to forestry and agriculture policies, while only 7% was allocated to energy. However, the public sector cannot meet the needs alone: in 2018, the country issued its first sovereign green bond, with support from the World Bank, to attract private capital for low-carbon projects.

At the international level, partners such as the Green Climate Fund and bilateral programmes contributed 34% of climate finance in 2011, but most of it was channelled through the Indonesia Climate Change Trust Fund (ICCTF), which was created in 2009 to centralise resources. Despite this, project implementation faces technical and bureaucratic bottlenecks, as demonstrated by the delay in the release of US$400 million earmarked for geothermal energy between 2010 and 2015.

== Islamic Financial Instruments ==
Indonesia, as the world’s largest Muslim country, is integrating Islamic financial instruments into its climate finance strategy, combining religious principles with environmental objectives. Green sukuk (Sharia -aligned green bonds) and environmental waqf (religious donations for ecological projects) are prominent as ways to finance the country’s transition to meet global goals such as the Paris Agreement.

In March 2018, the Indonesian government issued the world’s first sovereign green sukuk, raising US$1.25 billion for renewable energy and climate adaptation projects. The funds were allocated under the Green Bond and Green Sukuk Framework, reviewed by the Center for International Climate and Environment Research (CICERO), which rated the initiatives as having medium or high emissions reduction potential. Among the projects financed is the Sarulla geothermal power plant in North Sumatra, which avoids 1.3 million tonnes of CO_{2} emissions annually.

Under the waqf, Indonesia has developed dedicated forests in areas such as Aceh Besar and Bogor, where donated land is converted into conservation areas. The legalization process involves multiple government agencies, including the Ministry of Environment, Forestry and Climate Change, to ensure compliance with national laws and Islamic principles. As of 2019, the country had over 160,000 hectares of waqf land, of which 61% was certified, although less than 1% was earmarked for environmental projects.

Local regulation plays a central role. In 2017, the Financial Services Authority (OJK) issued a regulation requiring financial institutions to integrate environmental, social and governance (ESG) criteria into their operations. Banks such as Bank Syariah Indonesia have adopted green lending guidelines, although studies indicate that less than 5% of their portfolios are allocated to sustainable projects.

Challenges remain, such as the complexity of impact traceability: independent audits revealed that 30% of projects financed by green sukuk between 2018 and 2022 failed to achieve emissions reduction targets. Furthermore, the lack of unified standards for environmental waqfs generates disputes over the use of donated land, especially in regions with historical land conflicts.

Internationally, the Indonesian initiative has served as a reference: in 2021, the Green Climate Fund included Islamic finance in its report on alternative climate finance mechanisms, highlighting the potential to mobilize resources from Gulf Cooperation Council countries.

Despite the progress, studies point to structural challenges. Research by the Central Bank of Indonesia reveals that only 3% of sustainable bonds issued between 2020 and 2023 were green sukuk, reflecting the complexity of attracting conventional investors due to the lack of standardization of environmental metrics. In addition, academic analyses highlight that transparency in resource allocation is an obstacle: waqf -financed projects often face difficulties in proving concrete impacts, such as the restoration of degraded areas. Critics also warn of regulatory risks: the lack of a unified legal framework for Islamic climate finance makes it difficult to implement projects with a global scope, and generates disputes over the religious conformity of initiatives.

Despite their limitations, the potential of these mechanisms is recognized internationally. The Indonesian green sukuk has served as a model for countries such as Malaysia and Saudi Arabia, while the Green Climate Fund sees Islamic finance as an alternative for mobilizing resources from nations in the Arab World. Experts say success will depend on harmonizing national regulations requiring green credits with tax incentives capable of increasing private sector participation.

== Private financing ==
Private climate finance in Indonesia still prioritizes investments in agriculture and transportation. Between 2006 and 2013, only US$5.71 billion was directed to clean energy, reflecting the perception of high risk in renewable projects. Local banks, which hold 78.6% of the country’s financial assets, began adopting environmental criteria in 2018, after the Financial Services Authority (OJK) launched a plan for sustainable finance. In 2013, only 1.4% of bank loans were classified as “green”, focusing on renewable energy.

However, as of 2024, Bank DBS Indonesia has integrated ESG principles into its corporate banking framework, achieving approximately USD $117 million in ESG-based financing. It offers trade financing solutions that support sustainable development, green savings account and a credit card that reduces carbon emissions.

On the country's stock market, the Indonesian Composite Price Index (IDX), supports environmental, social, and governance (ESG) investments through indexes like the ESGQ45 IDX KEHATI and ESG Sector Leaders IDX KEHATI.

== See also ==
- Climate change in Indonesia
- Economy of Indonesia
- Climate Finance
