= Bangladeshi English literature =

Bangladeshi English literature (BEL) refers to the body of literary work written in the English language in Bangladesh and the Bangladeshi diaspora. In academia, it is also now referred to as Bangladeshi Writing in English (BWE). Early prominent Bengali writers in English include Ram Mohan Roy, Bankim Chandra Chatterjee, Begum Rokeya, Rabindranath Tagore and In 1905, Begum Rokeya (1880–1932) wrote Sultana's Dream, one of the earliest examples of feminist science fiction. Modern writers of the Bangladeshi diaspora include, among others, Tahmima Anam, Neamat Imam, Monica Ali and Zia Haider Rahman.

== Writers and their contributions (1774–2024) ==
Writer	Major Contributions
Thomas Babington Macaulay (25 October 1800 – 28 December 1859), British historian. Primarily responsible for the introduction of a Western-style education system in India.	Minute on Indian Education (1835)
Kashiprasad Ghosh	The Shair and Other Poems (1830)
Raja Ram Mohan Roy (1774–1833)	Critical essays during his lifetime
Michael Madhusudan Dutt (1824–1873)	The Captive Ladie and Visions of the Past, both published in 1849.
Toru Dutt (1855–1876)	Wrote and translated poetry into English. A Sheaf Glean'd in French Fields and Ancient Ballads and Legends of Hindustan were published in 1876 and 1882 respectively.
Bankim Chandra Chatterjee (1838–1894)	Debut English novel Rajmohan's Wife (1864)
Begum Rokeya (1880–1932)	Sultana's Dream (1905)
Rabindranath Tagore (1861–1941)	English translation of the poet's self-work, Gitanjali, to Song Offerings (1912)
Nirad C. Chaudhuri (1897–1999)	English writer of Bengal stories and autobiography
Razia Khan (1936–2011)	Poetry collections Argus Under Anaesthesia (1976) and Cruel April (1977)
Farida Majid (1942–2021)	Anthology of English poems Thursday Evening Anthology (1977)
Kaiser Haq	Black Orchid (1996) and In the Streets of Dhaka: Collected poems (1966—2006).
Feroz Ahmed-ud-din	Handful of Dust (1975)
Nuzhat Amin Mannan	Rhododendron Lane (2004)
Syed Najmuddin Hashim	Hopefully the Pomegranate (2007)
Rumana Siddique	Five Faces of Eve: Poems (2007)
Nadeem Rahman	Politically Incorrect Poems (2004)
Mir Mahfuz Ali	Midnight, Dhaka, collection of poems (2007)
Rafeed Elahi Chowdhury	"My Acid Romance" (2022), "Moho" (2023), "Fayez Just Became a Father"(2023), and "Rules of Eternity" (2023)
Adib Khan	Novels Seasonal Adjustments (1994), Solitude of Illusions (1996), The Storyteller (2000), Homecoming (2005), and Spiral Road (2007)
Monica Ali	Brick Lane (2003)
Tahmima Anam	A Golden Age (2007), The Good Muslim (2012), The Bones of Grace (2016)
Shazia Omar	First novel, Like a Diamond in the Sky (2009)
Mahmud Rahman	Short story collection: Killing the Water (2010)
Kazi Anis Ahmed	Collection: Good Night, Mr. Kissinger and Other Stories (2012)
Neamat Imam	The Black Coat (2013)
Farah Ghuznavi	Short story collection: Fragments of Riversong (2013)
Maria Chaudhuri	Beloved Strangers (2014)
Fayeza Hasanat	Short story collection: The Bird Catcher and Other Stories (2018)
Zia Haider Rahman	In the Light of What We Know (2014)
Razia Sultana Khan	The Good Wife and Other Tales of Seduction (2007)
Rashid Askari	Nineteen Seventy One and Other Stories (2011)
Saad Z. Hossain	Djinn City (2017)
Arif Anwar	The Storm (2018)
Mehrab Masayeed Habib	Slice of Paradise (2019)
Mahtab Bangalee	Behold (2022)
Sanya Rushdi	Hospital (2023)
Saroar Imran Mahmood	Tears and Poems (2023)
Priyanka Taslim	The Love Match (2023)
Tanwi Nandini Islam	Bright Lines (2015)

== Emergence of English in the Bangla Region (1774–1855) ==
The emergence of English-based literature in the Indian subcontinent is intertwined with the advent of the British Raj, with some of the important early examples being the critical essays of Raja Ram Muhan Roy, Thomas Babington Macaulay's educational work including the Minutes on Indian Education, and the establishment of Hindu College.

=== Raja Ram Mohan Roy (1774–1833) ===
Raja Ram Mohan Roy (1774–1833) is a foundational figure in Bangla literature. He is remembered for his social reforms, but he also contributed to the spread of English by establishing it as a medium of education and as the first moral essayist of BEL. Ram Mohan Roy was important for motivating the British Raj to establish Hindu college and introducing English as a medium of instruction. Chakraborty states that:

Prior to the advent of the British in India, the indigenous primary schools of Bengal taught very little beyond Bangla, simple Arithmetic, and Sanskrit, and the tols imparted lessons in advanced Sanskrit, grammar, and literature, theology, logic, and metaphysics. This failed to satisfy the aspirations of enlightened Indians like Raja Ram Mohan Roy, who felt that the process would only help to 'load the minds of youths with grammatical niceties and metaphysical distinctions' which had no practical use.

To solve this, Ram Mohan Roy aided the native gentry as well as the government to establish a formal institution for teaching secular ideologies, rather than Indian metaphysics and mythology.

Rashid Askari wrote that "Raja Ram Mohan Roy ..., the father of the Bengali Renaissance, was also the 'father of Indian literature in English'". Askari further notes that "[h]e was the pioneer of a literary trend that has extended over a vast area of the subcontinent, including Bangladesh". While in Rangpur, Ram Mohan took an interest in political developments in England and Europe. He read all the journals and newspapers that Digby got from England, and thereby not only improved his knowledge of English, which he had started to learn at the age of twenty-two, but also acquired considerable knowledge of European political thought.

Ghose has made a thorough discussion on the English work of Ram Mohan Roy. The following lists sketch the man's effort for social and political reforms from the perspectives of liberalism. The emergence of Ram Muhan Roy, the establishment of the Hindu College, and Macaulay's Minutes helped the emergence of English in the Bengal region. At this point, English literature writing in the Bangla region became much more accessible and common.

== 1830–1976 ==
The year 1830–1976 is characterized by the works of pioneering writers who wrote about traditional Bengali cultural sensibilities with the intellectual literary influences brought about by British colonial rule. Michael Madhusudan Dutt (1824–1873) is one of the most famous figures from this period and is often regarded as the first significant poet to write in English in Bengal. Though best known for his Bengali works, including Meghnadh Badh Kavya (The Slaying of Meghnadh), Dutt's contributions to English poetry, including his poetry collection Poems, marked him as a leading figure of this early literary phase.

As a teacher at Hindu College in Calcutta (now Kolkata), Henry Louis Vivian Derozio (1809–1831) emphasized the importance of Western ideas like rationalism and humanism. His poetry reflects these influences and addresses themes of love, patriotism, and the questioning of tradition. Rabindranath Tagore (1861–1941) wrote Gitanjali (Song Offerings), winning him the Nobel Prize in Literature in 1913. Kazi Nazrul Islam's (1899–1976) works often hark back to the influences of the 19th century. He wrote about radicalism, anti-colonial themes, as well as his exploration of Bengali cultural identity.

== Contemporary scene (2000–2022) ==
Contemporary Bangladeshi English writers write about the details of transnationalism, the Liberation War, political disharmony, massive unplanned urbanization, and identity issues. The contemporary Bangladeshi English writers who represent the young generations are either English-medium students living in Bangladesh or diaspora generations who are living abroad and feel the urge to express. These specified characteristic writers have a few things in common in that the Liberation War, political ups and downs, transnational experience, and massive urbanization serve as the background for their writings. The writings of Tahamina Anam, Monica Ali, etc. are rooted in the theme of the Liberation War of Bangladesh and transnational identity searching with the backdrop of multi-nationality.

A Golden Age by Tahmima Anam is set during the Bangladesh Liberation War in 1971. Anam is also the author of The Good Muslim. Zia Haider Rahman, a British Bangladeshi novelist, published his debut novel In the Light of What We Know in 2014, which won the James Tait Black Memorial Prize for literature in 2015. Monica Ali's Brick Lane was shortlisted for the Booker Prize in 2003. Published in the US in 2018, Fayeza Hasanat's debut short story collection The Bird Catcher and Other Stories addresses gender expectations, familial love, and questions of identity and belonging. Like A Diamond in the Sky by Shazia Omar portrays the psychedelic world of Dhaka's university students, who are caught up in the haze of drugs, punk rock, and fusion. Rashid Askari's short story collection Nineteen Seventy One and Other Stories (2011) has been translated into French and Hindi. In 2019, Mehrab Masayeed Habib wrote a novel named Slice of Paradise. It is an English novel based on Dhaka in the 1960s and published by Swore O Publication. The Merman's Prayer and Other Stories by Syed Manzoorul Islam wrote stories that are a mix of reality and fantasy.

=== Native Bangladeshi contributions ===
==== Fakrul Alam ====
Fakrul Alam (born July 20, 1951) is a scholar, writer, and translator. He writes on literary and postcolonial issues and has translated works by Jibanananda Das and Rabindranath Tagore into English. He has also translated Sheikh Mujibur Rahman's autobiographical works Asamapta Atmajibani (The Unfinished Memoirs) and Karagarer Rojnamcha (Prison Diaries), and Mir Mossaraf Hossain's epic novel Bishad-Sindhu (Ocean of Sorrow). In 2012, he was the recipient of the Bangla Academy Literary Award in translation and the SAARC Literary Award.

Notable works include:

- Jibanananda Das: Selected Poems with an Introduction, Chronology, and Glossary
- Ocean of Sorrow
- Essential Tagore
- The Unfinished Memoirs
- Prison Diaries

==== Kaiser Hamidul Haq ====
Kaiser Haq has contributed to the fields of poetry, translation of the poems of Shamsur Rahman, the leading poet of Bangladesh, and also prose translation. His works include:

Poetry
Serial no.	Book	Publication history
01	Starting Lines: Poems 1968–75	Dhaka: Liberty, 1978
02	A Little Ado: Poems 1976–77	Dhaka: Granthabithi, 1978
03	A Happy Farewell	Dhaka: University Press Limited, 1994
04	Black Orchid	London: Aark Arts, 1996
05	The Logopathic Reviewer's Song	Dhaka: University Press Limited and London: Aark Arts, 2002
06	Selected Poems of Shamsur Rahman (translations)	Dhaka: BRAC 1985; enlarged edition, Pathak Samabesh, 2007
07	Contemporary Indian Poetry (editor)	Columbus: Ohio State University Press, 1990
Prose translations
08	Quartet (Rabindranath Tagore's Chaturanga)	Oxford: Heinemann 1993, also in Tagore Omnibus Vol. I, Penguin India 2005
09	The Wonders of Vilayet (an 18th-century Indian's travel memoir)	Leeds: Peepal Tree Press, 2002

==== Niaz Zaman ====
Niaz Zaman is a writer, translator, and academic. She was honored with the Bangla Academy Literary Award in 2016 for her contribution to translation. Trees without Roots is a novel written by Syed Waliullah, Niaz Zaman, and Serajul Islam Choudhury that is grounded on Syed Waliullah's novel Laal Shalu. Trees without Roots depicts the natural scenery of Bangladesh, including the ravages of nature: floods and storms. She also shows the use of religion for food and shelter by the people.

==== Sabiha Haq ====
Sabiha Haq (born January 1, 1977) has garnered a reputation for postcolonial and gender issues, women's writings, and cultural studies. The Mughal Aviary highlights the literary contributions of four Muslim women in the Mughal regime in pre-modern India: Gulbadan, Jahanara, Zeb-un-Nessa, and Habba Khatoon, the Nightingale of Kashmir. This book covers roughly 200 years of the 16th and 17th centuries, reflecting the subjective tone and the self-fashioning of the princess under the Mughal regime through the forms of biography, hagiography, and poetry by the four Zenana writers.

The book cherishes the contribution of the three Mughal princesses: Gulbadan Begam (1523–1603), the youngest daughter of the Mughal Emperor Babur, Jahanara (1614–1681), the eldest daughter of the Emperor Shah Jahan, and Zeb-un-Nissa (1638–1702), the eldest daughter of the last Mughal Emperor Aurangzeb. The book also highlights the nightingale of Kashmir, Habba Khatoon (1554–1609). This book makes a discussion and critical evaluation of Humayun-Nama (a biography on the emperor Humayun, the half-brother to Gulbadan Begam) by Gulbadan Begam, where the biographer wrote about the lives of the wife and daughters of the Mughal Emperor, Babur.

The hagiography by Jahanara tends to glorify the Mughal monarchy. The third writer excels in poetry where the subaltern spirit peeps up with magical gaiety. Habba is famed for her lyricism in Kashmiri poetry. Her pangs of separation add an elegiac tone to the regional poetry. Thus, the author, Sabiha Haq, excavates the prominence of Muslim women's writings in pre-modern India, while history supposes to deliberately suppress the contributions of those living at the subaltern periphery.

The second chapter deals with Gulbadan as a biographer. Gulbadan positions Humayun from the neutral point of view being a man of flesh and blood as well as a strong sense of justice. Haq judges Gulbadan for making keen observations regarding Humayun's characteristics. The third chapter delves into the hagiography of Jahanara Begam. Jahanara writes a biography on Sufi masters like Hadrat Sheikh Nizamuddin Auliya in Munis-ul-Arwah, and Mullah Shah Badakhshi in Risala-i-Sahibiyah. She focuses on the spiritual power – soft power per se – of those Sufis that led to the spread of the Mughal dynasty. The Mughal Aviary traces the masculine flavor imposed on the translation of Jahanara's biography. The last chapter is developed with the author's argument that the course of the feminism and its history in the South Asian region needs to be redefined as to evaluate the literary contributions made by these four Muslim women under the patriarchal design of history.

==== Rashid Askari ====
Rashid Askari (born June 1, 1965) is a prolific writer in Bangladesh writing both in Bangla and English. He "stands out as a notable storyteller who brought Bangladeshi English literature into focus by coining the phrase 'Bangladeshi Writing in English'.... He situates Bangladeshi writing in English in a postcolonial global context and emphasizes the importance of translation for its future development". His English short story collection Nineteen Seventy One and Other Stories (2011) claims the secured place in the English literary arena of Bangladesh. The author wrote support for the 1971 Liberation War spirit through this book. Dr. Askari's characters are ordinary men: "a cowardly country teacher or an insignificant English Road whore or a wide-butt big-bust illiterate village wife torn apart by libido and jealousy at the same time or a suburban procrastinating self-delusional semi-fakir Jihadi, who seriously lacks guts and just wants to live and reproduce." So far as his writing style is concerned, Dr. Bina Biswas said, " Askari adopts both the first and third-person omniscient, contemplative point-of-view, depending upon the story. Each story is told from a past event, situation or a social issue and his acquaintance with it. In an age of aggressive intellectualism in the world and in the subcontinent, Askari has gone back to the older, subtler narrative style of twentieth century storytellers and has established himself as one of the trailblazers on the scene”.

=== Contribution of the Bangladeshi Diaspora ===
==== Monica Ali ====
Monica Ali's debut novel, Brick Lane, was published in 2003 and shortlisted for the Man Booker Prize that very year. Ali was born in 1967 in Bangladesh and immigrated to England in 1971; all her growth, study, and settlement occurred in England. The novel wrote the story of Nazneen: She is brought to England by Chanu through a settled marriage. Chanu is a middle-aged man searching for his fate in England; Nazneen is an adolescent representing the subservient, submissive wife who is a perfect choice for Chanu as he believes women must have wifely and motherly behavior in the British perspective. Nazneen follows the code validated by Chanu, gives birth to a son and two daughters, and satisfies Chanu, being only a wife in mind.

The change of currents takes place as Nazneen feels a sense of belongingness in British society along with her two daughters in the absence of Chanu's knowledge on what is going on in the psyche of his wife. Chanu fails to cope with British society and expresses his wish to retreat to Bangladesh, which is met with direct protest from his wife and daughters. Nazneen feels herself liberated. Chanu represents the first-generation Bangladeshi immigrant who feels guilt for the loss of his parental root in Bangladesh and longs for that past, though Nazneen, along with her daughters, belongs to the generations nonaligned with that of Chanu. Here lies the prime crisis all through the novel Brick Lane.

==== Tahmima Anam ====
Tahmima Anam was born in Bangladesh in 1975 and brought up abroad. She is settled in England. She is well known among Bangladeshi readers for her trilogy: A Golden Age (2007), The Good Muslim (2011) and The Bones of Grace (2016). This trilogy attempts to sketch out the family and socio-political ups and downs during the factional periods around the Liberation War, the rise of Muslim militancy and the reign of dictatorship in Bangladesh ranging from 1971 to the 1990s. The Golden Age (2007) was awarded the Commonwealth Prize for the first book category in 2008. In an interview with The Guardian, Anam says:

Those books were my way of putting myself back into that identity. I would wake up, sit down at my desk, cry all day and write, and then I would turn my computer off and go to sleep. If you feel, as I did, a very complex relationship to a place, writing a book about it is a great way to stake your claim: that is my country, that is my history.

Anam has been credited with two other books, The Startup Wife (2021) and The Face: Third World Blues (2021). The Golden Age (2007) and The Good Muslim (2011) are developed in the context of Bangladesh. Instead, The Bones of Grace (2016), The Startup Wife (2021), and The Face: Third World Blues (2021) reiterate the experiences of an immigrant, the search for identity, and an unattainable experience of escapism.

==== Tariq Omar Ali ====
Tariq Omar Ali taught history at University of Illinois, Urbana-Champaign, and, since 2019, at Georgetown University. His teaching and writings focus on nineteenth- and twentieth-century South Asia and global histories of capital. His first research book, the non-fiction A Local History of Global Capital: Jute and Peasant Life in the Bengal Delta, wrote about how global capitalism shaped peasant life and society in the Bengal Delta during the late nineteenth and early twentieth centuries. The writer has continued this exploration of how "decolonization, independence, and the rise of the nation-state restructured the working lives of peasants, boatmen, itinerant traders, and small businessmen in post-colonial East Pakistan (present-day Bangladesh) in the 1950s and 1960s".

==== Neamat Imam ====
Neamat Imam is a Bangladeshi-Canadian fiction writer (born January 5, 1971) whose name was popularized with the debut novel The Black Coat, a novel that uses a Bangladeshi political setting around 1974 when the Mujib government experienced a famine. Black Coat is a metaphor that represents the father of the Bengali nation, Sheikh Mujibur Rahman. The novel proceeds through analytical narratives of his political diction and philosophy and creates a dystopian arena run by the philosophy of totalitarianism. Khaleque Biswas, Nur Hossain, and Moina Mia are the major characters in the novel; the story continues with narration from Khaleque Biswas, who, after being fired from a job in journalism, joins the propaganda work for Mujib, the possessor of the 'Black Coat'.

==== Zia Haider Rahman ====
Rahman's debut novel is the 2014 In the Light of What We Know. The novel led to Rahman being awarded the James Tait Black Memorial Prize; the novel was also translated into many languages. Rahman is critical towards liberal elites.

== Media and journals ==
Bangladesh has an influential English-language press, including newspapers The Daily Star, New Age, Dhaka Tribune, The Muslim Times, and The Independent, which bring out regular literary supplements. Prominent magazines include The Star, Slate, Dhaka Courier, and Forum. Bengal Lights is one of the country's few English literary journals.

== See also ==
- Bangladeshi English
- Hay Festival Dhaka
