= List of artistic depictions of Sheikh Mujibur Rahman =

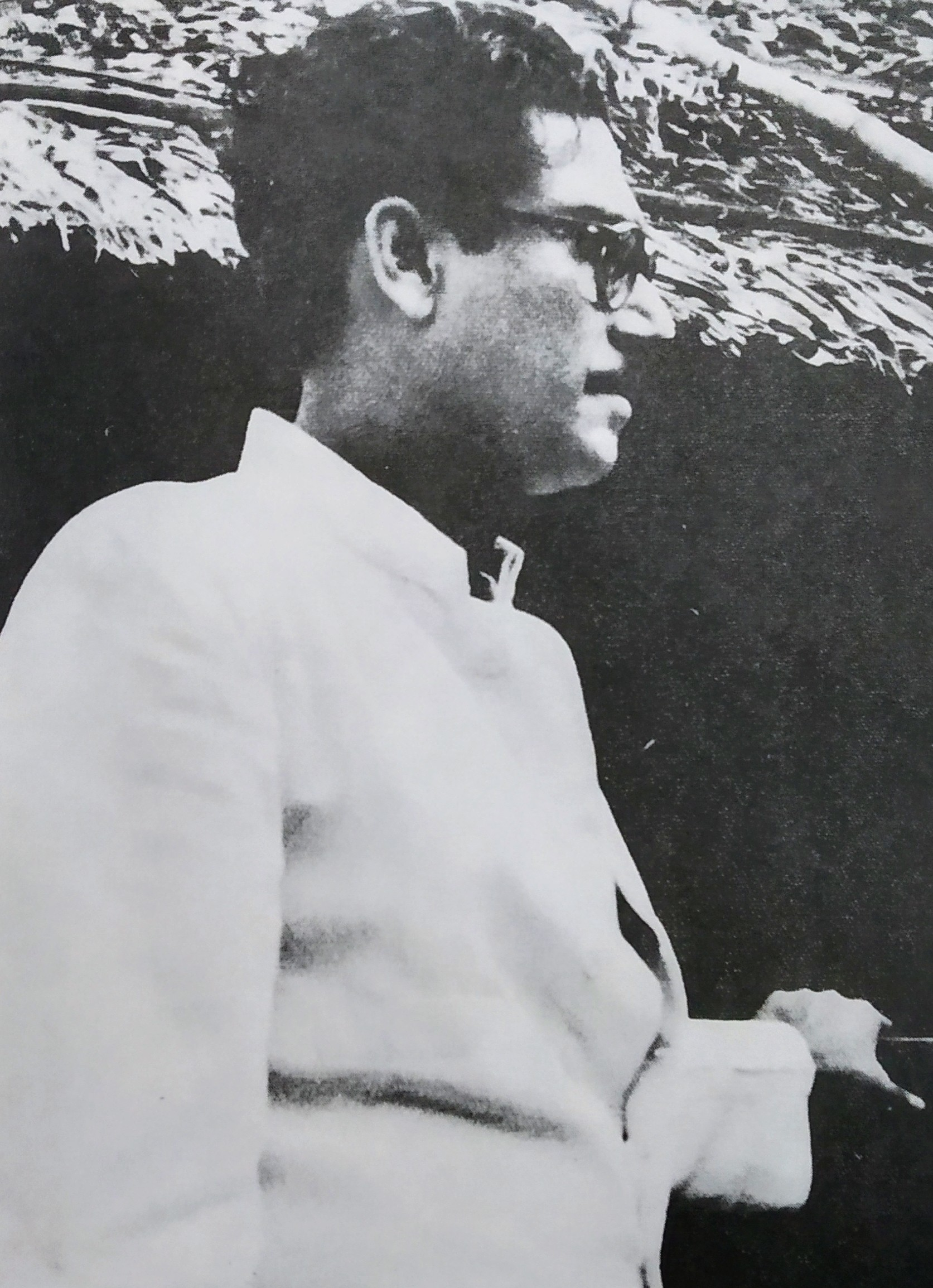
Sheikh Mujibur Rahman in 1954.

This is a list of artistic depictions of Sheikh Mujibur Rahman, the first president and founding leader of Bangladesh.

== Documentaries ==
- 1972: He's Back, a documentary on Mujib's homecoming on 10 January 1972, directed by S.N.S. Sastry. It covers the welcome given to Sheikh Mujibur Rahman at Delhi after his release from Pakistan and his return to Dhaka.
- 1972: Bangladesh, documentary on Sheikh Mujibur Rahman's nation-building activities was made by ABC TV of the United States.
- 1972: David Frost Program in Bangladesh, a documentary based on interviews with Sheikh Mujibur Rahman. British journalist David Frost made it based on the political life of Sheikh Mujibur Rahman.
- 1973: "Bengaru no chichi: Râman" (Rahman, The Father of Bengal), is produced by Japanese director Nagashi Oshima. A Japanese documentary based on Sheikh Mujibur Rahman's personal life, daily activities and subsequent plans.
- 1973: Welcome Bangabandhu, a documentary based on Sheikh Mujibur Rahman's state visit to Japan, produced by Mainichi Productions, Japan. To mark the 50th anniversary of the establishment of diplomatic relations between Japan and Bangladesh in 2022, the Embassy of Japan in Bangladesh released a digitally remastered version of the documentary entitled "Bangabandhur Japan Sofor" (Bangabandhu’s Japan Tour) with Bengali audio and Japanese subtitles.
- 1996: "Chironjib Bangabandhu" (Immortal Bangabandhu), Documentary on the life and work of Sheikh Mujibur Rahman. It began production on 10 August under the production of BM Salahuddin and aired on 15 August. The documentary was remade on digital film in the 2009–2010 fiscal year by the Directorate of Films and Publications of Bangladesh.
- "Sei Ondhokar" (That Darkness), eyewitnesses account based documentary of the Assassination of Sheikh Mujibur Rahman.
- "Bangabandhu O Bangladesh" (Bangabandhu and Bangladesh), a documentary on Sheikh Mujibur Rahman directed by Biswajit Saha.
- 2010: The Speech, a documentary film directed by Fakhrul Arefin Khan analyzing 7 March Speech of Sheikh Mujibur Rahman. This interview-based documentary explores the planning, implementation and preservation of speech recordings in strict secrecy.
- 2012: "Oshomopto Mohakabya"(The Unfinished Epic), a documentary based on "The Unfinished Memoirs" of Sheikh Mujibur Rahman.
- 2014: T-54, a documentary on the Assassination of Sheikh Mujibur Rahman produced by Maasranga Television.
- 2018: Hasina: A Daughter's Tale, Bangladesh documentary film on the life of Sheikh Hasina, daughter of Sheikh Mujibur Rahman.
- 2019: "Bangabandhu Theke Biswabandhu" (From the friend of Bengal to the friend of world), a special documentary on Sheikh Mujibur Rahman on the occasion of Mujib Year.
- 2021: "Bangabandhur Rajnoitik Jibon O Bangladesher Obbhudoy" (Bangabandhu's Political Life and the Rise of Bangladesh), a full-length documentary on the life of Sheikh Mujibur Rahman and the independence of Bangladesh, directed by Syed Sabab Ali Arju. It won the 45th Bangladesh National Film Awards in the 'Best Documentary' category.
- 2023: The Assassin Next Door, an episode of Canadian documentary series The Fifth Estate was released on Noor Chowdhury, the assassin of Sheikh Mujibur Rahman.

== Films ==
- 1974: "Sangram" (Struggle), a Bangladeshi historical drama film on the Bangladesh Liberation War, Sheikh Mujibur Rahman makes a cameo.
- 2014: Children of War, an Indian film about Bangladesh Liberation War. Sheikh Mujibur Rahman is portrayed by Prodip Ganguly.
- 2021: "Tarunner Alok Shikha" (The light of youth), a short film on Sheikh Mujibur Rahman directed by Shawki Syed.
- 2021: "Tungiparar Miya Bhai" (Dear Brother of Tungipara), a Bangladeshi film depicts various notable events of the earlier life of Sheikh Mujibur Rahman from 1930 to 1952 during his lifetime.
- 2021: August 1975, a Bangladeshi political drama film based on the immediate aftermath of assassination of Sheikh Mujibur Rahman. The film is directed by Selim Khan and Shamim Ahamed Roni.
- 2021: "Chironjeeb Mujib" (Immortal Mujib), a Bangladeshi film on Sheikh Mujibur Rahman, which states his life from 1949 to 1952.
- 2023: "Bangamata" (Mother of Bengal), a short film on the life of Sheikh Fazilatunnesa Mujib, wife of Sheikh Mujibur Rahman. Mujib is portrayed by Monir Ahmed Shakeel.
- 2023: "Dussahosi Khoka" (The Brave Boy), a film highlights the period of Sheikh Mujibur Rahman from birth to adolescence and youth (1920–1938).
- 2023: Mujib: The Making of a Nation, a Bangladesh-India joint production directed by Shyam Benegal with the lead role played by Arifin Shuvo.
- 2024: "570", a Bangladeshi film on the 36-hour timeline from the Assassination of Sheikh Mujibur Rahman till his burial.

== Television ==
- 1996: "Niswashe Tumi Biswase Tumi" (You in breath, you in faith), the first drama based documentary on Sheikh Mujibur Rahman directed by Kayes Chowdhury, aired on Bangladesh Television on 15 August.
- 2007: "Palashi Theke Dhanmondi" (From Palashi to Dhanmondi), With funding from the "Sheikh Mujib Research Center London", writer and journalist Abdul Gaffar Chowdhury made a television film of the same name in 2007 based on his autobiographical political novel "Palashi Theke Dhanmondi", starring Pijush Bandyopadhyay as Sheikh Mujibur Rahman.

== Theatre ==
- 2021: "288 Din" (288 Days), a drama based stage play based on the imprisoned life of Sheikh Mujibur Rahman during the Bangladesh Liberation War.
- 2021: "Obhishopto August" (Cursed August), a stage play Bangladesh Police theater troupe based on the Assassination of Sheikh Mujibur Rahman. Additional IG of Bangladesh Police Habibur Rahman has planned, researched and compiled the data for the play. Written and directed by Police Inspector Md. Zahidur Rahman.

== Animations ==
- On March 16, 2020, Bangladesh Postal Department's digital service Nagad paid tribute to Sheikh Mujibur Rahman by publishing a two-minute animated video based on Sheikh Mujib's biography on their Facebook and YouTube pages.
- 2021: "Khoka Theke Bangabandhu Jatir Pita" (From Khoka to Father Of The Nation Bangabandhu), Directed by Md. Hanif Siddiqui and produced by Taslima Khanam, with the technical support of AgamiLabs. The first 19 minutes and 20 seconds of the animation film, which was broadcast on 17 March 2020 on Ekushey TV, a popular television in Bangladesh. The first 40 minutes of the film aired on Ekushey TV on 17 March 2021. And lastly on September 28, 2021, the full-length movie of 1 hour 32 minutes was released on YouTube.
- 2021: "Mujib Amar Pita" (Mujib My Father), an animated film of the same name was under production based on the book "Mujib Amar Pita" written by Sheikh Hasina, daughter of Sheikh Mujibur Rahman and the current Prime Minister of Bangladesh, funded by the Information and Research Center. It was released on 28 September to mark Prime Minister Sheikh Hasina's 75th birthday.
- 2023: "Mujib Bhai" (Brother Mujib), an animation film produced by the Information and Communication Technology (ICT) Department's Mobile Games and Application Skill Development Project of Bangladesh, based on "The Unfinished Memoirs" of Sheikh Mujibur Rahman.
- 2023: "Amader Choto Russel Shona" (Our little Russel), an animated film about Sheikh Russel was released where Sheikh Mujibur Rahman was portrayed as father of Russel.
- 2023: Khoka, an animation series of ten episodes based on the childhood and adolescence of Sheikh Mujibur Rahman, initiated by the ICT department. The animation series is jointly produced by Mars Solutions, Team Associates, Magic Images and ProLancer Studios.

== Song ==
- "Shono Ekti Mujiburer Theke", a patriotic song created during the Bangladesh Liberation War in 1971.
- Jodi Raat Pohale Shona Jeto, an election song from 1991.
- 2020: "Tumi Banglar Drubotara" (You are the star of Bengal), a song composed by poet Kamal Chowdhury on the occasion of Mujib Year.

== Literature ==
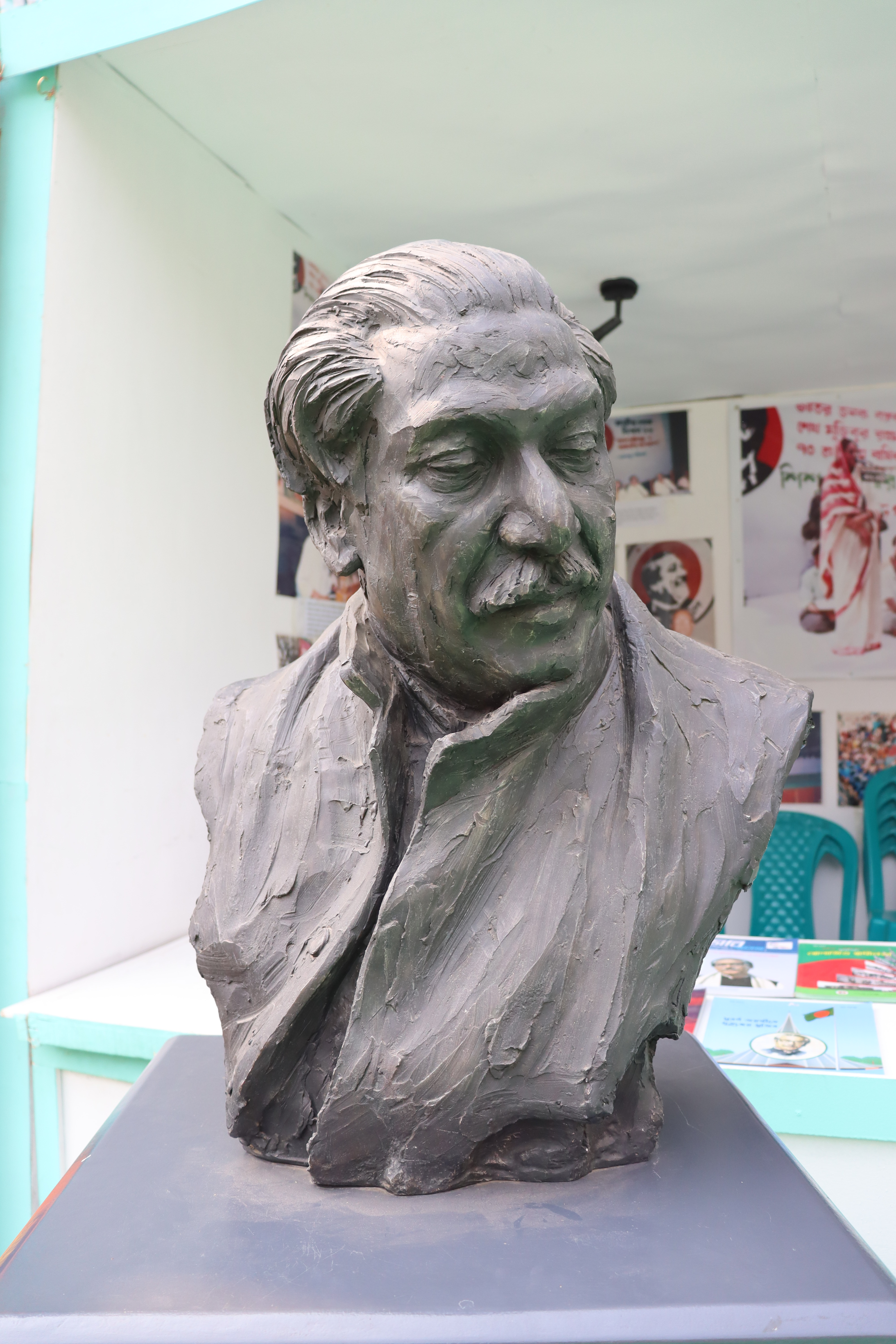
A bust of Sheikh Mujibur Rahman at the Ekushey Book Fair

- In 1973, the French intellectual Bernard Henri Levy in the book titled "Bangla-Desh, Nationalisme dans la révolution or Les Indes Rouges" (When Bangladesh was getting independent), analytically presented Sheikh Mujib in different contexts of national and international politics during the independence war of Bangladesh.
- In 1978, Sukhranjan Dasgupta, journalist of Anandabazar newspaper, in the book titled "Midnight Massacre in Dhaka" presented his own real experience about the investigation of Sheikh Mujib murder.
- In 1979, American journalist Lawrence Lifschultz described Sheikh Mujib and his assassination as narrated by Colonel Abu Taher in his book “Taherer Shakkho - Bangladesh: Ekti Oshomapto Biplob" (Taher's Testimony – Bangladesh: An Unfinished Revolution).
- 1986: "Facts and Documents: Bangabandhu Hotyakando" (Facts and Documents: Bangabandhu Assassination), a book written by Professor Abu Sayeed, one of the founders of the constitution of Bangladesh, the organizer of Bangladesh Liberation War, the former member of parliament from Pabna-1 constituency and the former minister of state for information of Bangladesh, in which he has presented his researched information and documents about the Assassination of Sheikh Mujibur Rahman.
- 1986: "Bangladesh: A Legacy of Blood", written by Anthony Mascarenhas. The author documents the events that took place around Sheikh Mujibur Rahman from the post-war period until his assassination.
- 1997: "Dusho Chheshotti Dine Swadhinata"(Independence in Two Hundred and Sixty Six Days), Bangladeshi lawyer and journalist Muhammad Nurul Qadir highlighted Sheikh Mujibur Rahman during the Bangladesh Liberation War.
- Humayun Ahmed included Sheikh Mujib in two of his historical novels, 2004's Jochona O Jononir Golpo and 2012's Deyal. Deyal was banned by the government of Bangladesh for its portrayal of Sheikh Mujibur Rahman.
- The Black Coat is a dark political satire with a critical view of Sheikh Mujibur Rahman published in 2013.
- In 2015, the Centre for Research and Information (CRI) department of Bangladesh, published a four-part children's comic book named Mujib based on Sheikh Mujib's two autobiographies ("The Unfinished Memoirs" and "The Prison Diaries").
- In March 2022, Muktidata Sheikh Mujib (Liberator Sheikh Mujib), a memoir of Mujibur Rahman, was published.

== Memorials, paintings, sculptures, and statues ==
The first artificial satellite launched by Bangladesh "Bangabandhu-1" has been named after Sheikh Mujibur Rahman. Longest Bridge of Bangladesh Yamuna Multi-purpose Bridge has been renamed as “Bangabandhu Bridge”. Also, in 1998 AD, the national stadium of Bangladesh located in Gulistan, "Dhaka Stadium", was renamed as Bangabandhu Stadium. In 2009, China-Bangladesh Friendship Conference Center located at Agargaon, Sher Bangla Nagar, Dhaka was renamed as "Bangabandhu International Conference Center". In 2004, the name of "Bhasani Novo Theatre" was changed to "Bangabandhu Sheikh Mujibur Rahman Novo Theatre".

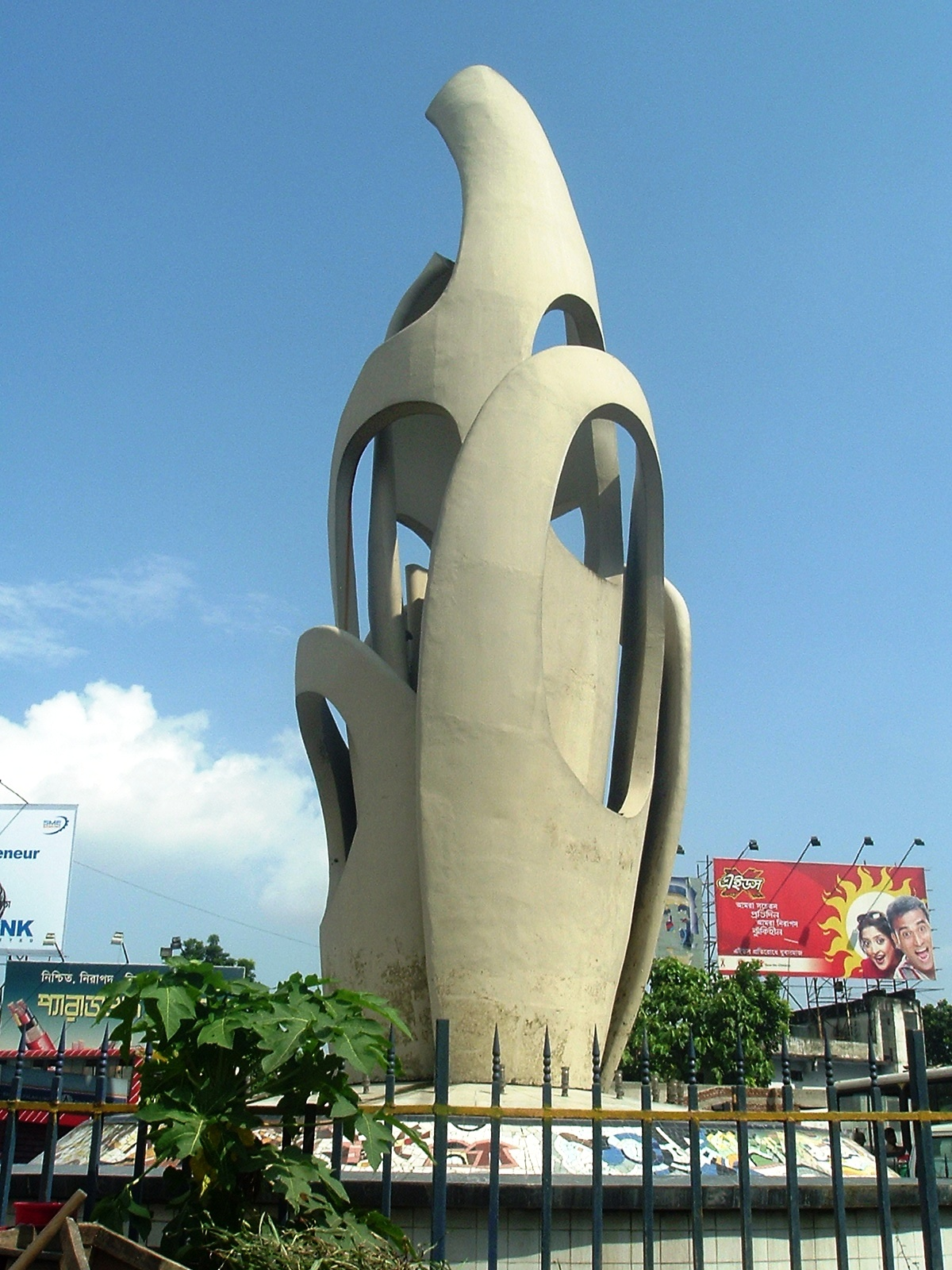
Bangabandhu Square Sculpture located in Gulistan, Dhaka

In 1998, Dhaka's "Institute of Post Graduate Medicine and Research" (IPGMR) was upgraded to a medical university and renamed as Bangabandhu Sheikh Mujib Medical University. Soon after the independence of Bangladesh, the main road of Agrabad, the commercial area of Chittagong city, was renamed as "Sheikh Mujib Road" from "Jinnah Road".

A bust of Sheikh Mujibur Rahman was inaugurated in Ankara, Turkey, in December 2021 and a park was renamed after him.

Two rooms of Baker Hostel (no. 23 and 24) were converted into a museum in honor of Sheikh Mujibur Rahman, the founding father and the first president of Bangladesh. The museum was inaugurated on 31 July 1998. On 23 February 2011, a bust of Mujib was installed in the hostel.

In 2017, the All Bengal Minority Youth Federation criticized the decision and demanded that the bust of Bangabandhu be removed from the hostel as Islam does not allow the installation of idols in the building. The organization's general secretary Kamruzzaman found this act objectionable because a mosque is located inside the hostel. The organization sent letters to Mamata Banerjee, the chief minister of West Bengal and Sheikh Hasina, the prime minister of Bangladesh, regarding the matter. In March, the month before Sheikh Hasina's visit to India, the central government of India had directed the West Bengal government to take action against the organization and its supporters, who it termed as anti-Hasina extremist groups.

Local Government, Rural Development and Cooperatives Minister of Bangladesh, Md. Tajul Islam, visited the museum in March 2019 and found defects in the bust, which was replaced by a new bust on August 3.

== Currency and stamps ==
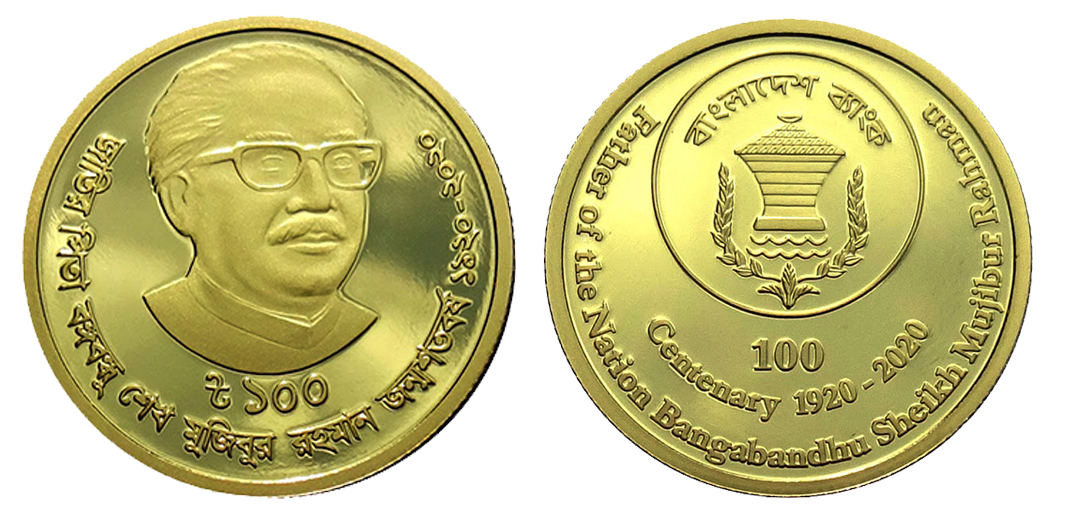
Commemorative gold coin to mark Mujib Year in 2020

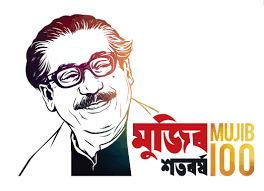
Official logo of Mujib Year

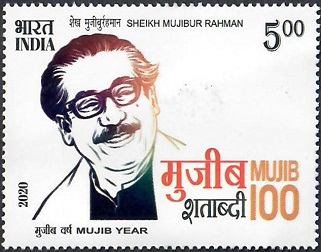
Bangladesh's neighbour India released a postage stamp to mark Mujib Year.
