= Khoka Theke Bangabandhu Jatir Pita =

2021 Bangladeshi full-length animated feature film

- Movie poster
- খোকা থেকে বঙ্গবন্ধু জাতির পিতা
- Directed by: Md. Hanif Seddiqui
- Story by: Toslima Khanam; Rudra Saiful; Sanjeeda Sharmin Promi.
- Based on: The Unfinished Memoirs by Sheikh Mujibur Rahman; The Prison Diaries by Sheikh Mujibur Rahman; Sheikh Mujib Amar Pita by Sheikh Hasina
- Produced by: Toslima Khanam
- Music by: Prithviraj Ranjan Nath
- Production company: AGAMiLabs Ltd.
- Release date: 28 September 2021
- Running time: 92 minutes
- Country: Bangladesh
- Language: Bengali

Khoka Theke Bangabandhu Jatir Pita (Bengali: খোকা থেকে বঙ্গবন্ধু জাতির পিতা) is a 2021 Bangladeshi full-length animated feature film, based on the life of Sheikh Mujibur Rahman, the founding father and first President of Bangladesh. The film was produced by AGAMiLabs and directed by Md. Hanif Seddiqui. The film is based on national textbooks including Sheikh Mujibur Rahman's The Unfinished Memoirs, The Prison Diaries and his daughter Sheikh Hasina's book Sheikh Mujib Amar Pita. The film shows Sheikh Mujibur Rahman's childhood, his relationship with the land and people of Bengal, his mind and interaction with the world around him.

== Plot ==
The movie begins with a childhood flashback from a Bekar Hostel in Kolkata. Then the movie ends with Calcutta riots, partition of the country, creation of new student institutes, Dhaka University employee movement-cancellation of studentship, language movement, 6 points, Agartala Conspiracy Case, mass uprising of 69s, Bangabandhu title, 70s elections, 7th March speech, and declaration of independence. The main goal of this film is to present the ideals and philosophy of Bangabandhu, the beloved leader, the great hero of freedom, to children, teenagers and young people in an easily understandable way through animation.

== Characters ==
The film Khoka Theke Bangabandhu Jatir Pita shows numerous historical characters including from Sheikh Mujibur Rahman to his mother, father, consort Bangmata Begum Fazilatunnesa Mujib, children Sheikh Hasina, Sheikh Kamal, Sheikh Jamal, Sheikh Russel, four national leaders, Maulana Bhasani, Shamsul Huq, Huseyn Shaheed Suhrawardy, A. K. Fazlul Huq and Tofail Ahmed.

== Production ==
The work on the movie was started from the beginning of 2019. In addition to ten animators, more than a hundred artists and voice artists worked on the film. The film was made entirely with AGAMiLabs' own funds and almost all the savings of the director and producer in the recession economy of the Corona pandemic. Lack of skilled manpower has to be faced. The film was directed by Md. Hanif Seddiqui. The story is edited by AGAMiLabs' managing director and producer of this film Toslima Khanam, Rudra Saiful and Sanjeeda Sharmin Promi. A bunch of young animators and painters have taken the lead in complex work like animation. The story unfolds in the voices of a group of young actors associated with theater. The film is made with the music direction and sound technique of Prithviraj Ranjan Nath.

== Release ==
The first 22 minutes of the film was first aired on Ekushey Television on 17 March 2020, on Bangabandhu's birth centenary. In continuation of that, another 40 minutes was broadcast on 17 March 2021. On 28 September 2021 at the birth time at 8.45 pm of Prime Minister Sheikh Hasina, the film was casually released for everyone on AGAMi TV's YouTube channel, paying homage to Bangabandhu and Bangabandhu's daughter.

== See also ==
- Cinema of Bangladesh
