= Mujib coat =

Bangladeshi traditional men's coat inspired by Sheikh Mujibur Rahman

The Mujib coat (Bengali: মুজিব কোট) is a tailored coat for men, designed as an arms cut-off (sleeveless), high-necked coat with two pockets in lower part and five or six buttons. This used to be the signature garment worn by Sheikh Mujibur Rahman, the first president of People's Republic of Bangladesh.

== History ==
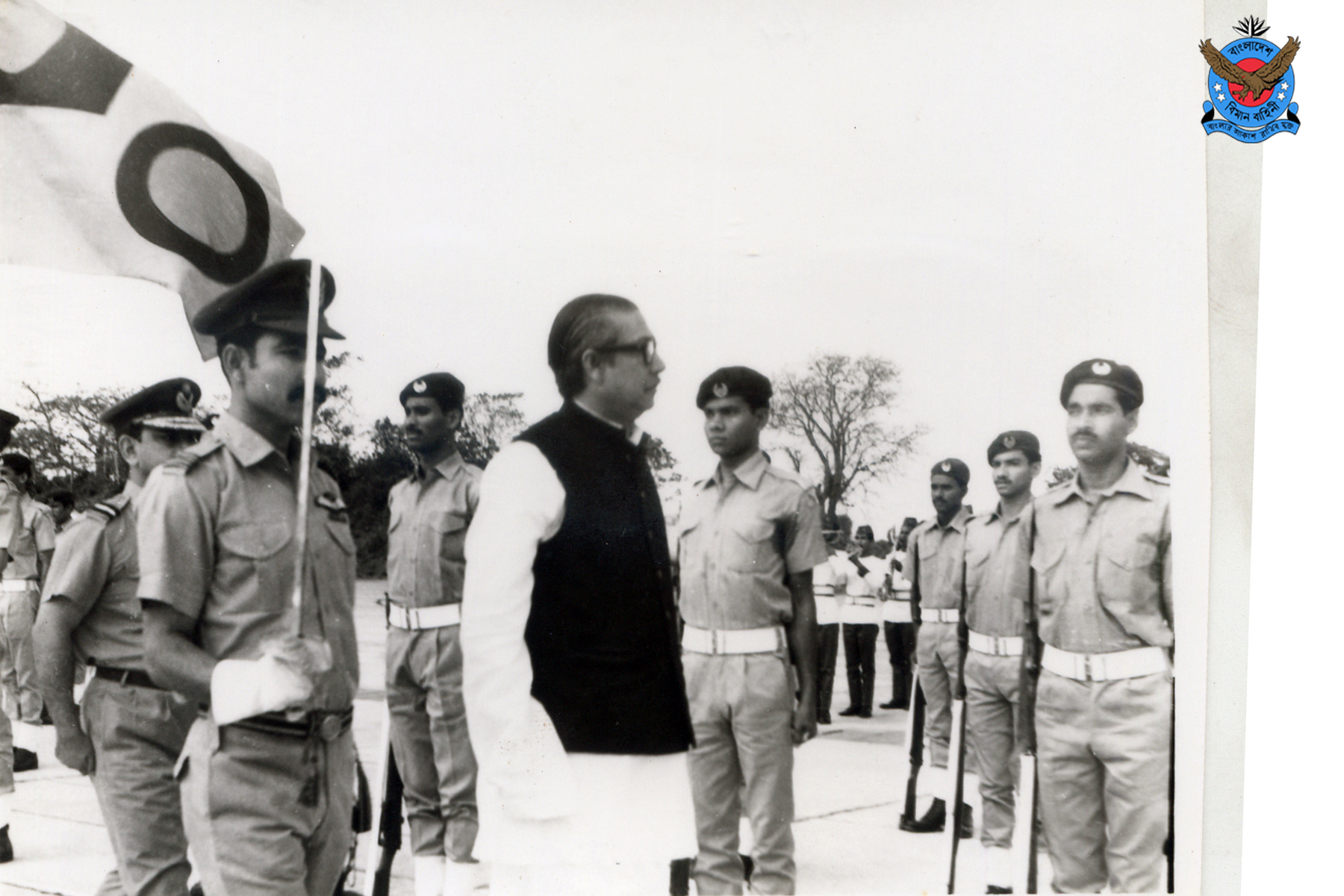
Sheikh Mujibur Rahman wearing a Mujib coat

The Mujib coat is a transformation of the Nehru jacket, which used to be worn by Jawaharlal Nehru, the prime minister of India from 1947 to 1964. It is claimed by many that the coat worn by Sheikh Mujibur, known as the Mujib Coat, had six buttons which concurred with the Six-point charter of 1966. However, sources close to Rahman and senior Awami League leaders claimed that there was no relation between Mujib Coat and Six-point charter. When Sheikh Mujib started to wear this coat is not well-established, but it is alleged that he wore it when the Awami League was founded in 1949. Kamal Hossain, who was Rahman's lawyer in the Agartala Conspiracy Case, and a very close political aide, stated that Rahman started to wear this distinctively designed coat from 1968 onwards.

== Legacy ==
The Mujib Coat is a recognizable garment in Bangladesh and is strongly associated with Sheikh Mujibur Rahman. Supporters of the Awami League often wear it as a sign of loyalty or identification with the party’s tradition. Critics, however, sometimes view it less as a cultural item and more as an ideological uniform tied to partisan politics. Some observers note that by the early 1970s it had become widespread among political figures, serving as a convenient emblem of alignment rather than a personal choice.

In literature, the coat has also been depicted critically. In The Black Coat (2013), novelist Neamat Imam portrays it as both a unifying garment and a political costume, noting that "the coat had the power to make all men look the same – strong and unafraid in the quest for freedom".

== See also ==
- The Black Coat, a historical novel by Bangladeshi-Canadian author Neamat Imam
