= M Sirajul Islam =

Bangladeshi politician (1935–2013)

- Born: March 18, 1935
- Died: January 27, 2013 (aged 77)
- Organization: Bakul Group Limited
- Spouse: Begum Jinnat Islam

M Sirajul Islam was a businessman and Awami League politician. He was elected Member of the National Assembly from Dacca in the Pakistan general election of 1970. After the outbreak of the Bangladesh liberation war, the elected members of the National Assembly from East Pakistan and the members of the East Pakistan Provincial Assembly transformed themselves into a constituent assembly. The constituent assembly drafted the Constitution of Bangladesh, and he was one of the signatories.

== Early life ==
M Sirajul Islam was born in Alur Bazar, Dhaka. He completed his graduation from Jagannath University. After completing his graduation he joined M M Ispahani group's cotton section. He worked and served Ispahani Group for several years. Later he quit his job and started doing his own business and so he formed Bakul Group.. Bakul Group, the oldest cotton trading and indenting company of Bangladesh, has been around since 1964. It has seen many ups and downs before becoming one of the largest cotton indenters/importers of Bangladesh.

== Political career ==
Being a younger brother of Yar Mohammad Khan he followed his footsteps and joined politics from student life. M Sirajul Islam was very active in politics of Bangladesh. He was arrested during the Language Movement in 1952. However Yar Mohammad Khan finally took necessary steps to release his brother from the Jail. After getting nomination from Bangladesh Awami League, M Sirajul Islam was elected A Member of the National Assembly from Dacca in the Pakistan general election of 1970. He quit politics in 1973.

== End of political career ==
He was requested by Sheikh Mujibur Rahman to perform the election in 1973 from the same constituency Dacca from which he won in 1970, but M Sirajul Islam refused by saying the country is now independent and it is under the safe hand of Sheikh Mujibur Rahman, therefore if the country needs him to fight he will get back as long as Bangabandhu wants him.

== Contributions ==
He was the governor of Lions Bangladesh, founder member of National Medical College Hospital and president of Dhaka Mahanagar Samity. He was the life member of Bangladesh Lions Foundation, Anjuman Mofidul Islam, Bangladesh Family Planning Association, Bangladesh Diabetic Association, National Heart Foundation, Bangladesh Red Crescent Society, Life- Member, Bangladesh Tuberculosis Society, Liver foundation of Bangladesh, Bangladesh Shishu Hospital. He was also the chairman of education for Emancipation Trust and Lions PDG Forum. Sirajul Islam joined Underprivileged Children's Educational Programs (UCEP)-Bangladesh as an associate member in 1990. He was chairperson of the UCEP Board of Governors from 2005 to 2006.

== Honours ==
In 2005, he was awarded the "Ambassador of Goodwill" by Lions Clubs International in recognition of his services to the less fortunate.

== Death ==
At the age of 77, M Sirajul Islam died on January 27, 2013, at the Apollo Hospitals Dhaka, living behind his wife and three sons Ehsan Islam, M Faizul Islam and Shahed Islam, a host of relatives and admirer.

== See also ==
- Yar Mohammad Khan
- List of national constitutions
