= The Startup Wife =

2021 novel by Tahmima Anam

- Author: Tahmima Anam
- Language: English
- Genre: Contemporary fiction, Romance
- Publisher: Canongate (UK), Scribner (US)
- Publication date: June 3, 2021 (UK), July 13, 2021 (US)
- Media type: Print (Hardcover, Paperback)
- Pages: 304
- ISBN: 978-1-982156-18-3

The Startup Wife is a 2021 contemporary fiction novel written by the British-Bangladesh writer, Tahmima Anam, published by Scribner in the US and Canongate in the UK. The book is an introspection on the startup industry and its relation to technology, gender, and ambition. The book was long listed for the 2022 Aspen Words Literary Prize.

== Synopsis ==
The novel follows Asha Ray, a gifted coder who drops out of her MIT PHD program to pursue a technology startup with her husband Cyrus Jones and their friend Jules. Asha builds an algorithm called WAI (We are Infinite) to create personalized rituals for people feeling disconnected from organized religion, getting accepted to the Utopia incubator.

WAI becomes a viral sensation with Cyrus becoming the company's public face and spiritual leader with Asha becoming obsolete in her own company. The startup wife follows the dynamic and identity struggles in Asha's marriage and company as love, ambition, and gender inequalities in male-dominated industry collide.

== Characters ==
Asha Ray: Main Character, a Bengali-American programmer and MIT PHD student who drops out to co-found a tech startup with her husband and her friend. Creates the algorithm for the WAI platform.

Cyrus Jones: Asha's high school crush and husband, co-founder of a tech startup and the public face of WAI .

Jules: Cyrus and Asha's close friend and third co-founder of WAI. Works within WAI's funding, marketing, and operation.

Deborah: A senior and executive where Asha, Cyrus, and Jules develop their startup, Utopia incubator, plays a role in molding their business's image and dynamics.

Mona: Asha's friend who also works in the technology industry.

Li Ann: Utopia's head of innovation, decides that WAI has enough potential to join Utopia.

Rory: A member of Utopia, runs the platform, Lonestar. He acts as a competitor of WAI within Utopia.

Destiny: Founder of Consentify, a platform meant to help with safe, consensual encounters, and later employee of WAI.

Nandini Ray: Asha's mother, supportive of Asha's ambitions but concerned about Asha's well being.

Subodh Ray: Asha's father, skeptical of Asha's choices and business.

== Background ==
=== Author ===
Tahmima Anam is a Bangladesh-born British writer known for her trilogy: A Golden Age, The Good Muslim, and The Bones of Grace. The Startup Wife was inspired by Anam's experiences as an immigrant and her experiences as the wife of the founder of a startup tech company.

=== Context ===
Anam explained in an interview with NPR that she had written the novel to depict the treatment of male founders in the technology industry as visionaries, while women find themselves sidelined.

== Themes ==
=== Gender inequality and power dynamics ===
Asha Ray and other women demonstrate the gender bias in the technology industry. Cyrus's role in WAI highlights the gap in respect and bias as although the algorithm Asha programs is the foundation of the startup they build, Cyrus gets most of the credit and becomes the face of the company, showing how her work gets overshadowed by Cyrus. This novel critiques the imbalance women feel in both professional and romantic relationships and the challenges women face to get recognition for their work.

The novel is also meant to empower women. As Asha develops, she learns to take back her power and not to diminish herself in order to elevate her husband or the other privileged men in her life.

=== Marriage ===
One of the big struggles Anam wanted to be highlighted in The Startup Wife is the balancing act between career and marriage. The main character, Asha, struggles with her love for her husband and her company. She is troubled by boundaries with her husband and her work, allowing her husband to have power over her and take credit for all of her work. By allowing Cyrus to become the focus of her world and her company, she sidelines herself, causing dissonance in her marriage and work.

== Awards ==
- Long listed for 2022 Aspen Words Literary Prize
- Short listed in 2022/2023 Comedy Women in Print Prize
