= Yar Mohammad Khan =

Bangladeshi politician (1920–1981)

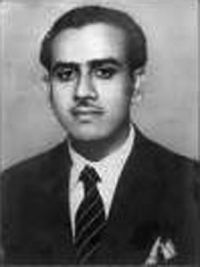
- Born: September 9, 1920; Rayer Bazaar, Bengal Presidency, British India
- Died: August 29, 1981 (aged 60); Vellore, India
- Resting place: Rai Saheb Bazar Family Graveyard, Dhaka
- Occupations: Bangladeshi Politician, Founder of Bangladesh Awami League and The Daily Ittefaq
- Spouse: Late Begum Jahanara Khan

Yar Mohammad Khan (September 9, 1920 – August 29, 1981) was a Bangladeshi politician and statesman. He was the co-founder and first treasurer of the Bangladesh Awami League, the major political party that eventually led Bangladesh's struggle for independence against Pakistan.

Khan’s residence at 18, Karkun Bari Lane, Dhaka, was the League’s party office for its first few years. As treasurer, he donated a Jeep and a newspaper, The Daily Ittefaq, to the party. He financed the Awami League in its initial stages and helped position it into the leading party in Bangladesh’s independence movement.

== Early life and family ==
Yar Mohammad Khan was born in a wealthy family of Old Dhaka. His father Saleh Mohammad Khan was an established contractor. His family had made a great contribution to the growth and development of Awami League politics in the initial period of Pakistan.

== Education ==
Yar Mohammad Khan passed Senior Cambridge from Dhaka Saint Gregory School.

== Political career ==
=== Formation of Awami Muslim League ===
In 1949, Moulana Bhasani discussed the possibility of forming a new political party with disaffected elements of the East Pakistan Muslim League. A committee, headed by Bhashani, as president, and Yar Mohammad Khan, as secretary, was established to organize a June 23 conference, at which the resolution creating the Awami Muslim League was adopted. Yar Mohammad Khan was closely associated with the founding of Awami Muslim League on 23 June 1949, himself becoming its treasurer. At that time, it was a very challenging task to exercise opposition politics including founding a party in the face of stern opposition from the Pakistan government as well as the dhaka nawab family. In the backdrop, the contributions of Yar Mohammad Khan and Shwakat Ali alias Shwakat Mia (1918-1975) towards building up of Awami League at the initial stage have been duly acknowledged by Bangabandhu on several pages of his recently published book 'Asampa Atmajiboni' (The Unfinished Memoirs), UPL 2012.

In 1949 people were gearing up for a grand meeting of workers. From our jail cell we came to know that elaborate preparations going on. An office has been set up at 150 Mughaltuli. Shawkat Mia was looking after all the logistical details. Who else in Dhaka was competent enough to take care of food and accommodation matters? Yar Mohammad Khan, a veteran League worker of Dhaka was assisting him. Mr. Khan was resourceful in that he had the finances and the manpower to help. The party was formed and named East Pakistan Awami Muslim League. Moulana Bhasani was made President, Shamsul Huq was General Secretary, Ataur Rahman Khan, Vice President, Sheikh Mujibur Rahman, Joint Secretary and Yar Mohammad Khan, Treasurer.

— The Unfinished Memoirs Page-129

=== Karkun Bari Lane ===
The three storied house of Yar Mohammad Khan located at 18, Karkun Bari Lane in Dhaka became the first Party office of Awami Muslim League, which later become Awami League. Party meetings were held in the Hall Room there. Abdul Hamid Khan Bhashani, Huseyn Shaheed Suhrawardy, Sheikh Mujibur Rahman also attended those meetings. Begum Jahanara Khan wife of Yar Mohammad Khan during those days used to cook lunch and dinner for the Awami League party workers. Before cooking, Begum Jahanara Khan used to ask everyday to Sheikh Mujibur Rahman about the number of workers available for lunch and dinner and Sheikh Mujibur Rahman replied today 14 workers for lunch and 18 workers for dinner. Begum Jahanara Khan at Karkun Bari Lane entertained the Awami League party workers during that time made enough contribution to bond the party workers further like a family.

=== Mogultuli ===
150, Mogultuli, Dhaka was a famous party place for Muslim League. In January 1948 Shamsul Haque and Sheikh Mujibur Rahman wanted to establish a newly organized Muslim League and therefore they created a workers camp at 150 Mogultuli. In February 1948, Professor Ibrahim Khan resigned from south Tangail and Maulana Bhashani won that seat in by election. Instead Maulana Bhashani was banned for election till 1950. A new date for by election was declared for South Tangail. Pakistan Muslim League nominated Khurram Khan Ponni of Korotia, while Shamsul Haque was nominated from East Pakistan. Shamsul Haque got huge support from Yar Mohammad Khan, Shawkat Ali, Aziz Ahmed and others and won the by election on 26 February 1949. Chief Minister Nurul Aminpostponed the election and a case was filed against Shamsul Haque. South Tangail seat remained vacant. When Maulana Bhashani was released from Jail he came to Mogultuli and declared that the conspiracy of west Pakistan hast to stop. A committee was formed where Bhashani was the President and Yar Mohammad Khan became the Secretary.

=== Rose Garden ===
Being afraid of Bhashani's activity against west Pakistan many people turned their back. But during such a time Kazi Humayun Bashir declared that Maulana Bhashani along with Yar Mohammad Khan can organize the meeting at his house Rose Garden located at K.M Das Lane, Dhaka. The meeting began on 23 June 1949 and at least 300 people attended that meeting. Finally a new party was formed named as Awami Muslim League opposing Muslim League. The organizers declared that they do not want to be a part of Muslim league anymore as they remain neglected. They formed Awami Muslim League so that they can say something against Muslim League's negligence. Sheikh Mujibur Rahman was in prison, so he couldn't attend that meeting. The committee declared Maulana Bhashani as president, Ataur Rahman Khan as vice president, Shamsul Haque as General Secretary, Sheikh Mujibur Rahman as Joint Secretary and Yar Mohammad Khan as a treasurer of the Awami Muslim League.

=== Organized the public meeting of Awami Muslim League at Armanitola, Dhaka ===
We of course knew that Liaquat Ali Khan was coming to Dhaka on 11 October 1949 who told journalists he had no idea what Awami League was! So we called another public meeting in Armanitola Maidan on 11 October 1949. We had one microphone and our workers went around on a horse carriage to announce the date and time of the meeting. Muslim League attacked them and snatched away the microphone from them. I took along with me students league's leader Nurul Islam and Chawk Bazar's Nazir Mia and Abdul Halim. We headed for their Victoria Park Office since I found out that they reassembled there. They used to hang around the first floor of the Cooperative Bank building.

When we reached the building we found them deep in discussion. I knew two of them Ibrahim and Alauddin from my Muslim League days. I said, Why have you snatched our microphone away? That is very unfair. Give it back to us. They said, We didn't take it and have no idea who is responsible for it. Right then two Awami League workers, Yar Mohammad Khan and Hafizuddin were passing by in a rickshaw. I hailed Yar Mohammad and appraised him about what was happening. Yar Mohammad Khan was a long-time resident of the city and came from a good family, was well-off, and had many people working for him. He told them, why did you take away the microphone? So what if we have? At this Yar Mohammad raised his fist and hit the man. Their colleagues at the Muslim League now joined in and attacked us. The owner of Presidency Library, Mr Humayun came out and took Yar Mohammad Khan to his office. Meanwhile our opponents began to hail abuse on us from outside the office. I took a rickshaw and rushed to the Awami League office where I recruited some ten to twelve of our workers. Hafizuddin took a rickshaw too and sped to Yar Mohammad's neighborhood. Instantly, his brother, relatives, friends and neighbors thronged to the spot. Those who were abusing Yar Mohammad Khan, vanished immediately. When I came back to the scene, the police had arrived. Yar Mohammad's men accompanied him and they attacked the local Muslim League office, which was just round the corner in Rai Saheb Bazar. From this day forward, no one had the courage to assault or harass us any more in Dhaka. From this time onward Yar Mohammad began to take an active part in politics too, consolidating our party's strength in Dhaka city. This incident was enough to establish Awami League in the Dhaka city.

The Unfinished Memoirs Page-139-140

After the meeting Maulana Bhashani led a procession and move to Government House where Prime Minister Liaquat Ali Khan was present. Police arrested Bhashani, Shamsul Haque and others. During the clash between police Maulana told Sheikh Mujib to fled the scene, Moulana Bhasani used to stay with Yar Mohammad Khan's house at 18 Karkun Bari Lane. I had to meet him to find out why he had wanted me to evade arrest. I took a rickshaw to a fellow party worker's house. The two of us then headed for Yar Mohammad Khan's house. I could enter the house through a rear door. We took this route to get in. The policemen who were guarding the front door thus failed to spot us. The Moulana and Yar Mohammad seemed very glad to see me. I asked Moulana why he had wanted me to flee and avoid arrest. Moulana Bhasani told me to meet Mr Suhrawardy at Pakistan and discuss to form a new party opposing Muslim League.

=== Assisting Sheikh Mujibur Rahman in organizing Awami League ===
Mr. Ataur Rahman Khan was assisting me in every manner possible in running the party. Yar Mohammad Khan was also helping me in many ways. After Shamsul Huq I had to organize the party. Yar Mohammad Khan began to assist me in party work and I found him indispensable. The first party council meeting was summoned in Dhaka. However, getting a hall for the purpose proved difficult. In the end Yar Mohammad Khan managed to get Mukul Cinema Hall for the council. The Unfinished Memoirs Page-240

=== The Founding of Ittefaq ===
Yar Mohammad Khan was the founder and publisher of the newspaper Ittefaq, which started as a weekly in August 1949. Yar Mohammad Khan financed publishing the 'Weekly Ittefaq' from the Paramount Press at 9 Hatkhola Road, Dhaka and at the beginning Mr Faizur Rahman who lived in 50, Nawabpur Road was the editor. The media plays a significant role and can have a strong impact on political outcomes and Yar Mohammad Khan was aware of that. As Yar Mohammad Khan was actively involved into politics of anti-Pakistan movement, he called and appointed Tofazzal Hossain as its editor, who was working in Kolkata at the time as a journalist for The Daily Ittehad. Since 15 August 1951 Ittefaq resumed its publication and it played a significant role in the 1954 general elections, and it contributed to the victory of the United Front. Ittefaq then kept opposing all military rule of Pakistan starting from Ayub Khan to Yahya Khan. Eventually during this time, Ittefaq went from being a weekly to becoming a daily newspaper. Yar Mohammad Khan was the publisher so he declared that Ittefaq will be officially Bangladesh Awami League party's paper. He did this through a power of attorney and at that time since Moulana Bhashani was the president therefore his name was published as a founder of The Daily Ittefaq. In 1958 Tofazzal Hossain changed the name of the original founder and publisher and replaced it with his name. The newspaper incorrectly displays Tofazzal Hossain as its founder.

=== United Front ===
I came to know that Sher-E-Bangla Fazlul Huq and Maulana Bhashani signed an agreement to form United Front. I just couldn't figure out how such a thing could have taken place. When I came back to Dhaka I went to Mr. Yar Mohammad's house to meet Moulana Bhasani. The Awami League office was on the ground floor of the building in which Mr Yar Mohammad lived. Soon after Sher-E-Bangla was elected the leader of the United Front he was invited by the Governor of East Pakistan to form the ministry. He told the Governor that he would soon submit the list of the ministers. That evening Mr. Hossain Shahid Suhrawardy and Moulana Bhasani went to meet him. I accompanied the two to Mr. Huq's house. However, I was not made privy to their discussions which took place in another room. After a while Shahid Surwahardi and Moulana Bhasani came out and we went straight to Yar Mohammad Khan's residence. Mr. Ataur Rahman Khan was already there. They told us that Mr. Huq wants to form a government with 4-5 ministers. At that meeting Shahid Surwahardi, Moulana Bhasani and all of us decided that Awami League wouldn't join his cabinet now. Mr. Huq declared to Mr. Surwahardi and Moulana Bhasani that, 'I won't make Sheikh Mujibur Rahman minister in my cabinet. Mr. Suhrawardi responded, 'It is up to me and the Moulana to decide who the Awami League will nominate.' When we all were discussing all these in Yar Mohammad Khan's house, Mr. Huq sent a message that he would include me in his cabinet. The Unfinished Memoirs Page-256

=== Member of East Bengal Legislative Assembly ===
In the 1954 elections, Yar Mohammad Khan was elected MLA from the United Front as an Awami League nominee. The United Front being an alliance of parties of which the Awami League was the most important part. 'United Front' consisted mainly of four parties of East Bengal, namely Awami League, Krishak Sramik Party, Nizam-e-Islam Party and Ganatantri Dal.

=== Accompanied Sheikh Fazilatunnesa Mujib To The Prison Gate ===
Renu got my things ready. I told her, 'Do what you think is best but staying at Dhaka will be tough for you all. It will be best for you to go to our village.' I had requested my friend Yar Mohammad Khan to rent a house for her if Renu decided not to go to our village. He and the owner of Hotel Al Helal, Haji Helal Uddin had done so and helped her in my absence. A few days later when Yar Mohammad Khan was bringing Renu to meet me he was arrested at the prison gate. He had been elected MLA from a Dhaka Constituency.

Seeing the arrest of Yar Mohammad Khan, Sheikh Fazilatunnesa Mujib get back to Yar Mohammad's residence. Sheikh Fazilatunnesa Mujib hugged Begum Jahanara Khan and burst out into tears blaming herself for such an arrest of Yar Mohammad Khan. Sheikh Fazilatunnesa kept on crying. Begum Jahanara Khan passed the blame to the government instead of Sheikh Fazilatunnesa in order to stop her crying. Yar Mohammad Khan was released after 9 months. However Sheikh Mujibur Rahman and Yar Mohammad Khan spend some good times on the same cell inside the prison. Renu sent me a telegram to inform me that my father was very ill and had little chance of surviving. At that time Mr. M.N. Khan was the chief Secretary of East Pakistan. At 8 pm I heard he had given my release order. I was sad at the thought of leaving behind my colleagues especialty Yar Mohammad Khan since had been arrested at the time when he had come to meet me at the prison. I told him, 'Either you will be released or I will be back in prison with you again.

=== Kagmari Conference ===
Yar Mohammad Khan was the treasurer of the Kagmari Conference committee which was the first national conference of the Awami League held on 6–10 February 1957. During the conference, Maulana Bhashani said "goodbye" ("Assalamu Alaikum") to the West Pakistani authority. Mirza Ahmad Ispahani was a close companion of Yar Mohammad Khan flew by helicopter and assisted him by providing necessary funds and attended the historic conference.

=== Social life ===
Yar Mohammad Khan being the president of Dhaka City Awami League finally resigned on 12 July 1957 and quit politics forever due to some unavoidable circumstances. After that the chairman of Ispahani Group Mirza Ahmad Ispahani requested him and he started working and joined M. M. Ispahani Limited as a Director.

Abdul Hamid Khan Bhashani, Mirza Ahmad Ispahani, Yar Mohammad Khan, and Sheikh Mujibur Rahman remained friends, even after quitting politics.

=== Assassination of Sheikh Mujibur Rahman ===
On 15 August 1975, a group of junior army officers invaded the presidential residence with tanks and killed Mujib, his family and personal staff. Only his daughters Sheikh Hasina Wajed and Sheikh Rehana, who were visiting West Germany, survived. When Yar Mohammad Khan heard the news of Bangabandhu's death over radio he collapsed from his chair to the floor. He suffered a minor cardiac arrest. Family members took him to a hospital and when he returned to his sense he said to put ice on his head. He couldn't accept the fact of the assassination of Sheikh Mujibur Rahman. Yar Mohammad loved Bangabandhu Sheikh Mujibur Rahman so much that he did everything to stand beside him.

=== Acknowledgment of achievement ===
Yar Mohammad Khan was a giver and not a taker. Yar Mohammad Khan played a bigger role in establishing Bangladesh Awami League in the Dhaka city and being the owner by publishing Ittefaq which played a vital role during the liberation period. The Awami League's first office was on the ground floor of Yar Mohammed Khan's three-storey house on 18, Karkunbari Lane. Many of the present generation do not know the name of the Awami League's founder and its innumerable leaders and workers. However, Sheikh Mujibur Rahman acknowledged the contribution of Yar Mohammad Khan in his autobiography The Unfinished Memoirs.

== Death ==
Khan died from cardiac arrest on August 29, 1981, at CMC Hospital Vellore, Tamil Nadu, India. Survivors included his wife, two sons, five daughters, a host of relatives, and admirers.

== See also ==
- Awami League
- Sheikh Mujibur Rahman
- The Daily Ittefaq
- M Sirajul Islam
- Abdul Hamid Khan Bhashani
- Ashab Uddin Ahmad
- Shamsul Huq
