= Mujib Bhai =

2023 Bangladeshi animated feature film based on the life of Sheikh Mujibur Rahman

- Poster
- মুজিব ভাই
- Directed by: Chandan K Barman; Sohel Mohammad Rana
- Written by: Adnan Adib Khan
- Screenplay by: Ajoy Dasgupta
- Story by: Ajoy Dasgupta
- Based on: The Unfinished Memoirs by Sheikh Mujibur Rahman
- Produced by: Zeenat Farzana; Arif Mohammad; MD Shofiul Alam
- Starring: See below
- Production companies: Technomagic Private Ltd; Hypertag Ltd
- Distributed by: ICT Division
- Release date: 23 June 2023
- Running time: 47 minutes
- Country: Bangladesh
- Language: Bengali

Mujib Bhai (Bengali: মুজিব ভাই) is a 2023 Bangladeshi animated feature film, based on the life of Sheikh Mujibur Rahman, the founding father and first President of Bangladesh. The film was produced by the Information and Communication Technology Division and jointly directed by Shohel Mohammad Rana and Chandan K. Barman. The film is based on The Unfinished Memoirs, the autobiography of Sheikh Mujibur Rahman. The animation film showed the events of a certain period in the life of Bangladesh's founding president Sheikh Mujibur Rahman from 1948 to 1969.

== Plot ==
The film aims to deal with this current uprising anarchy and motivate people once again in the light of Bangabandhu's political career. The inspiration of Bangabandhu's political career lies in the unfair, demeaning and rage inducing treatment of the Indian subcontinent people by the British dominance. This story is of Mujib's life struggle from being a very loving child of his parents to becoming Mujib Bhai to people. It intends to address the current emerging disorder and inspire people once more. The unfair, degrading, and enrage-inspiring treatment of the people of the Indian subcontinent by the British hegemony served as the basis for Bangabandhu's political career. He fought against obstacles throughout his life. From his student days, he bravely defended his motherland against the powerful Pakistani army. His unwavering courage and selflessness made him a true champion.

== Voice cast ==
- Robiul Aual Ronnie
- Jahanger Alam
- Ariful Islam
- Risal Khandoker

== Production ==
The film was produced by ICT Division of Government of Bangladesh. Directed by Chandan K Barman and Sohel Mohammad Rana, the screenplay has been written by Adnan Adib Khan. The story and screenplay were edited by Ajoy Dasgupta. The ICT division produced the film with Zeenat Farzana, Arif Mohammad, and MD Shofiul Alam as the team producers. Sound engineer Risal Khandoker. Additionally, Tanmoy Ahmed was the research lead, Mustafa Muhammad Hossain acted as the project advisor, and Bayzid Khan Rahul was the executive producer. The animation has been developed by Technomagic Private Ltd, in association with Hypertag Ltd. The film was developed through the Skill Development Project on Mobile Games and Applications of the Department of Information and Communication Technology.

== Release ==
The poster of the film was released on 27 May 2023, which showcases the film title, ‘Mujib Bhai’, emblazoned in bold letters, accompanied by a painted portrait of Bangabandhu Sheikh Mujibur Rahman. A scene depicted in the poster shows Bangabandhu standing at the witness stand, surrounded by a group of lawyers. Mujib Bhai premiered at Star Cineplex in Dhaka on 23 June 2023. State Minister for ICT Division Zunaid Ahmed Palak inaugurated the exclusive premier of the film with a number of street children at the Star Cineplex. The Movie made a special screening on 26 August 2023 at the president palace of Bangladesh Bangabhaban. President Mohammed Shahabuddin inaugurated the special screening. First Lady Rebecca Sultana and ICT State Minister Zunaid Ahmed Palak were also present there.
