= In the Light of What We Know =

Book by Zia Haider Rahman

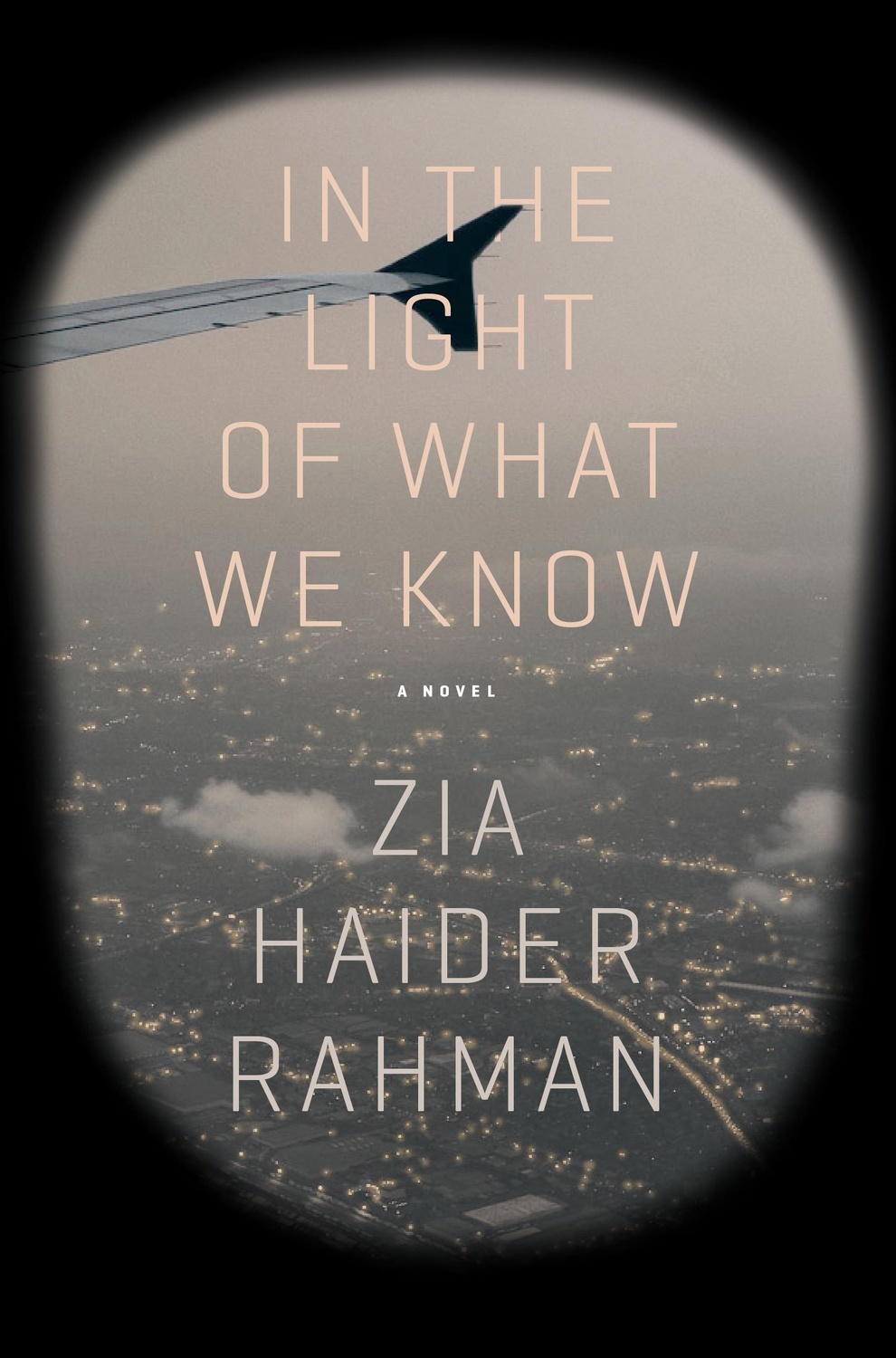
- Author: Zia Haider Rahman
- Language: English
- Publisher: Farrar, Straus and Giroux
- Publication date: 2014
- Publication place: United States
- Media type: Print (hardback & paperback)
- Pages: 512
- ISBN: 0374175624

In the Light of What We Know
- Author: Zia Haider Rahman
- Language: English
- Publisher: Picador
- Publication date: 2014
- Publication place: United Kingdom
- Media type: Print (hardback & paperback)
- Pages: 576
- ISBN: 978-1447231233

In the Light of What We Know is the first novel by Zia Haider Rahman. First published by Farrar, Straus and Giroux, it was released in the spring of 2014 to international critical acclaim and earned Rahman the James Tait Black Memorial Prize, Britain's oldest literary prize, previous winners of which include Evelyn Waugh, Graham Greene, J. M. Coetzee, Nadine Gordimer, Angela Carter, Salman Rushdie and Cormac McCarthy. The novel has been translated into many languages, including Czech, Greek and Arabic.

== Outline ==
Much of the novel is set during the war in Afghanistan at the beginning of the century and the 2008 financial crisis. One September morning in 2008, an investment banker approaching forty, his career in collapse and his marriage unraveling, receives a surprise visitor at his townhouse in South Kensington. In the disheveled figure of a South Asian male carrying a backpack, the banker recognizes a long-lost friend, a mathematics prodigy who disappeared years earlier under mysterious circumstances. The friend has resurfaced to make a confession of unsettling power.

The story ranges from Kabul to London, New York City, Islamabad, Dhaka, Oxford, and Princeton, NJ—and explores the questions of love, belonging, science, and war. At its heart is the friendship of two men and the betrayal of one by the other.

Rahman has described the backbone of the novel as an exploration of the question: how much we can rely on what we think we know? Reviewers have said that "the book challenges any attempt at summary."

== Critical reception ==
Writing in The New York Review of Books, the novelist and critic Joyce Carol Oates described the novel as "remarkable…an adventure story of sorts, echoing not only the canonical Heart of Darkness but F Scott Fitzgerald's The Great Gatsby, the novels of dislocation and inquiry of Graham Greene and W.G. Sebald, and…the spy novels of John le Carré…and a novel of ideas, a compendium of epiphanies, paradoxes, and riddles clearly designed to be read slowly and meditatively; one is moved to think of Thomas Mann's The Magic Mountain…this powerful debut…is a unique work of fiction bearing witness to much that is unspeakable in human relationships as in international relations." In a "Books of the Year" feature in The Times Literary Supplement, Oates further wrote that "among outstanding novels is the impressive debut of Zia Haider Rahman, the meditative, mysterious, decidedly non-page-turner In the Light of What We Know, a postcolonial novel writ large. The meticulous interweaving of Rahman's fiction necessitates reading both forward and back, and makes us realize: who cares about "page-turners" when the true pleasure of a work of fiction is its gravitational pull upon us?"

In a 4,000-word review for The New Yorker, the critic James Wood described Rahman as "a deep and subtle storyteller" and praised the novel as "astonishingly achieved… Isn't this kind of thinking — worldly and personal, abstract and concrete, essayistic and dramatic — exactly what the novel is for? How it justifies itself as a form?… In the Light of What We Know is what Salman Rushdie once called an 'everything novel.' It is wide-armed, hospitable, disputatious, worldly, cerebral. Ideas and provocations abound on every page."

The Australian literary critic Louise Adler, reviewing the novel for The Sydney Morning Herald, wrote, "My faith in fiction has been restored… Rahman writes brilliantly and hilariously about British class-consciousness… a satisfyingly and richly argumentative novel… In the Light of What We Know is my international book of 2014. It is a novel that makes sense of the past decade, its geopolitical tensions and the way we as hapless individuals experience those complexities."

The novel received wide critical acclaim internationally. Alex Preston in The Observer called it "an extraordinary meditation on the limits and uses of human knowledge, a heart-breaking love story and a gripping account of one man's psychological disintegration. This is the novel I'd hoped Jonathan Franzen's Freedom would be (but wasn't) — an exploration of the post-9/11 world that is both personal and political, epic and intensely moving". "[T]ackles the big questions…with supreme narrative skill… a masterpiece," wrote Kevin Power in the Irish Sunday Business Post; Amitava Kumar in The New York Times called it "strange and brilliant". "[A] great work…one of the most extraordinary novels I have ever read", said Madeleine Thien in the New Canadian Media; "unsettling and profound…utterly absorbing", said The Guardian; Maggie Fergusson in Intelligent Life called it "astonishing… an intellectual banquet...The ingredients range from philosophy, religion and mathematics to international aid, high finance and carpentry. But the question at its heart is simple: how does knowledge relate to wisdom, happiness and truth? And the story, which ranges from Islamabad to Wall Street and from 9/11 to 2008, is gripping". The Sunday Times called it "an extraordinary achievement". Mint/Wall Street Journal said it was "the finest book written by an Indian subcontinent-origin author". "[A] ground-breaking work of staggering genius", said Open magazine. The Times Literary Supplement called it "among many other things, a beautiful, anguished tirade against narrowness and complacency". Dawn called it "a semantic and linguistic Wonderland". "A virtuoso debut". and "gorgeously written" said Vogue. The Daily Beast wrote of "sentences ramifying and unraveling to bring in more and more ideas… in a way that few still alive can command." On the Dutch television show, De Wereld Draait Door, a panel of critics unanimously praised the book, saying "This is the Great American Novel," "Rahman is one of the great writers of our time" and "This book proves that the novel is not dead but vital and flourishing." "A great and powerful novel," wrote Florence Noiville for Le Monde. In a review for Libération, the broadcaster Kathleen Evin called it "a magnificent book". Les Inrockuptibles described it as "the total novel of our contemporary crises. To plunge into this text, full of digressions yet beautifully maintained, is to embark on a journey through time, space, and inside yourself."

Criticisms of In the Light of What We Know include Hannah Harris Green, writing in The Los Angeles Review of Books in a review titled "What Female Characters?" that, while "Rahman has a brilliant mind, capable of understanding many kinds of people. I hope one day he endeavors to try and understand women. Otherwise, for all his uniqueness, he will be yet another respected male author who would rather speak for women than to them."

"In the Light of What We Know appeared in several lists of best books for 2014, including in The Observer, The Times Literary Supplement, Slate, Kirkus Reviews, NPR, The Daily Telegraph, The Atlantic, Barnes and Noble Review and The New Yorker. Selecting it as one of three great novels she read in 2014, the critic Wendy Lesser wrote that the novel reminded her of Joseph Conrad because of "the layers of narrators (there are two) and the contemplative weave of politics and fiction…The characters' complicated lives, which are at the foreground of the book, persuasively justify everything." Philip French described it as "dazzling… what Henry James called a 'large, loose, baggy monster' — but for our century." Rebecca Mead of The New Yorker wrote that the novel was "talky and intellectual, while also unfolding a riveting drama: a deeply satisfying book," and that it was "a 21st-century novel written with the ambition of scope of a 19th-century novel, and bearing the seriousness of purpose of a 20th-century one."

In the Light of What We Know earned Rahman the James Tait Black Memorial Prize, Britain's oldest literary prize. It was long-listed for the Orwell Prize 2015, the Guardian First Book award 2014, the Authors' Club Best First Novel Award 2015, shortlisted for the Goldsmiths Prize 2014 and nominated for the Folio Prize 2015. Rahman was shortlisted for the New Writer of the Year award at the UK National Book Awards 2014. The novel won the inaugural International Ranald McDonald Prize 2016.
