= The Black Coat =

2013 novel by Neamat Imam

- Author: Neamat Imam
- Language: English
- Genre: Dystopian, political fiction, social science fiction
- Published: 22 May 2013 Hamish Hamilton/ Penguin Books India
- Publication place: Bangladesh
- Media type: Print (hardback)
- Pages: 256 pp
- ISBN: 9780670086658

The Black Coat is a historical novel by Bangladeshi-Canadian author Neamat Imam. It is "a meditation on power, greed and the human cost of politics." The Sunday Guardian commented that it is "destined to be a future classic" and will be used as the "gold standard for any book which seeks to engage with South Asian politics or history."

Published in 2013 by Penguin Books India in Hamish Hamilton imprint, it presents a dark and dystopian portrait of Bangladesh under Prime Minister Sheikh Mujibur Rahman. In this novel Imam reflects on Sheikh Mujib as a totalitarian ruler who distorted truth and suppressed political opposition to strengthen his tyranny.

== Plot ==
The novel tells the story of journalist Khaleque Biswas and his protege Nur Hussain. After Khaleque loses his job with the Freedom Fighter, he trains Nur only to turn him into a fake Sheikh Mujib. Sheikh Mujib was the leader of the Bangladesh Liberation War and Prime Minister of the country in its post-independence period. Khaleque and Nur start earning money using the blind nationalistic fervour of their countrymen during the Bangladesh famine of 1974 when thousands of people died from starvation and Sheikh Mujib began to lose his popularity.

Nur recites the famous 7th March Speech of Sheikh Mujibur Rahman, trying to popularise Sheikh Mujib and his party the Awami League. But after observing the sufferings of Bangladeshi people during the famine, he begins to criticise Sheikh Mujib. At the height of that criticism, he calls Sheikh Mujib a 'monster' and a 'disgrace'.

After this, Khaleque has only one thing to do. To eliminate Nur or bear the consequences, as Moina Mia, Awami League MP and the person who has introduced the duo to Sheikh Mujib, thinks it is Khaleque who has convinced Nur to speak against the Prime Minister. He chooses the former.

== Structure ==
The Black Coat has a Prologue and an Epilogue. In the Prologue, Khaleque is seen to reflect on his life sitting at the stairs of a Shaheed Minar. It is Sheikh Mujib's birthday and a remembrance program is about to begin at the city's central public square. In the Epilogue, he is still sitting at the Shaheed Minar, the remembrance program has ended, and he decides to offer himself to the police for killing Nur Hussain.

The main story is divided into Book 1 and Book 2. Book 1 has 26 chapters and Book 2 30 chapters. Book 1 ends as Khaleque is transformed into a radical follower of Mujib from his harsh critic, and Book 2 presents the incidents up to the murder of Nur Hussain.

== Title ==
The black coat in this novel refers to the sleeveless coat that Sheikh Mujibur Rahman used to wear during his political campaign. In Bengali, it is called Mujib Coat (মুজিব কোট).

== Themes ==
=== Sheikh Mujib's flawed legacy ===
In this novel, Imam has dealt with one of the most tumultuous and controversial phases of independent Bangladesh's history (1972–75) when the country, barely recovering from the effects of a brutal war of independence, had faced a crippling famine, poor governance and law and order problems under the notorious Rakkhi Bahini, climaxing in the abolition of multi-party democracy and an ushering in of the infamous Bangladesh Krishak Sramik Awami League (BAKSAL) dictatorship. That period is politically a taboo subject in Bangladesh and this book presents Sheikh Mujib as an autocrat instead of what he is popularly known as: Father of the Bengali Nation. In Chapter 16 of Book 2, "His Monster Speech," Nur Hussain says: "This is the mistake of one person and one person alone. I have struggled with myself hard but today I can tell you the truth: Sheikh Mujib has become a monster, and as I speak of my emptiness here, he is coming for you." In a blog post on his site, Imam writes that Bangladeshis "should remove Sheikh Mujib’s pictures from all schools and public places, so that we can protect our children from mastering wrong values and from making a wrong meaning of politics."

=== Government and politics ===
The novel's back flap reads: "Intense yet chilling, this brilliant first novel is a meditation on power, greed and the human cost of politics." In book 1 Chapter 6, "My Valued Companion," Imam writes: "The person who goes against the government is not an enemy of the people. Those who accept their government's limitations in silence are the real enemies." In Chapter 17 of Book 2, "A Conversation and a Warning," Khaleque Biswas says: "One cannot expect a smart government in a country which does not have smart citizens. Citizens have to know clearly what they want. Our people are shameless. How many directions do we have on earth? Ten. But they will move in any direction they want without bothering about decency and meaning. Seventy million people will talk about seventy million solutions to the same problem."

=== Intelligence and arrogance ===
Khaleque Biswas is a highly intelligent person. He can condemn the government of Sheikh Mujib in the most attacking manner, and he can also protect it with confidence and evidence, which makes him unreliable as a character. He is also an extremely arrogant person, who believes the world belongs to only those who can think, speak and prosper. In Chapter 13 of Book 2, he says: "It is not mandatory... that a society must have people who are vile and who rear filthiness instead of grit and ambition... All the able and intelligent men in the country, people who are creative and do not surrender to the demands of hungry stomachs, should rush to this camp at this very moment to burn these tents down, to peel the skin off these shameless human animals. Sheikh Mujib should pass the necessary orders to his militiamen to dig a deep trench to bury all the faint-hearted people alive, thus ushering in a new era for the intelligent to grow up with beautiful minds, and help advance this country. It does not matter how many unfit ones are buried to nurture the fit ones; those who cannot fight for a sustainable existence should perish without mercy."

== Real-life prototypes ==
=== Nur Hussain ===
Nur Hussain may refer to real-life Bangladeshi protester Nur Hossain, who is most widely known for his opposition to the autocratic government of Hussain Muhammad Ershad. On 10 November 1987, he was shot dead by the police before the General Post Office building in Dhaka. Two slogans on his chest and back read: ″স্বৈরাচার নীপাত যাক, গণতন্ত্র মুক্তি পাক″ (Down with autocracy, let democracy be established).

=== Shah Abdul Karim ===
Shah Abdul Karim (1916–2009) was a highly popular Bangladeshi folk singer. The character Shah Abdul Karim in The Black Coat is loosely based upon him. Sheikh Mujibur Rahman was a fan of Karim and once gave him TK. 500 as gift after listening to his songs. Karim wrote over 1600 songs in his lifetime. In The Black Coat novel, he is seen to sing spiritual songs at the refugee camp raising his Ektara, which was his constant companion in real life.

=== Mostafa Kamal ===
Mostafa Kamal's character is based on Sepoy Mostafa Kamal, a section commander of the 2nd Platoon. He was on the 4th East Bengal Regiment during the Liberation War and was posthumously awarded "Bir Shrestho", the highest gallantry award in Bangladesh.

== Major characters ==
- Khaleque Biswas: Journalist at the Freedom Fighter who loses his job after writing a feature against Sheikh Mujib's government. He is the narrator of the novel and from a critic of Sheikh Mujib, he turns into a nationalist to do propaganda work for Sheikh Mujib.
- Nur Hussain: The villager coming to the city looking for employment; Biswas's protege.
- Moina Mia: Member of Parliament and an Awami League Leader

== Minor characters ==
- Sheikh Mujib: Prime Minister Sheikh Mujib himself
- Shah Abdul Karim: Singer, spiritualist
- Abdul Ali: Moina Mia's personal assistant
- Ruhul Amin: Gatekeeper at Moina Mia's residence
- Basu and Gesu: Two workers at Moina Mia's house
- Mostafa Kamal: A martyr of Bangladesh liberation war
- Raihan Talukder: A villager from Ganagasagar; the man who sends Nur Hussain to Khaleque Biswas

== Reception ==
In the first major review of The Black Coat, entitled "Father And Sons, Or The Lie of the Land" and published in Outlook India, Indian author Indrajit Hazra called the novel an "extraordinary book ... a fine work of fiction." In the same review, Hazra went on to say, "Very few novels examine a period in history so convincingly even as it turns away from the standard style of historical fiction. Imam does this in this hyper-realistic tale of fools, thugs, dangerous idealism and sanctified pretense, reminding us who have forgotten a secret function of the novel: to unsettle us, instead of just be moving."

Mint, India's business newspaper, called The Black Coat "a powerful fictional revisiting of Sheikh Mujibur Rahman's troubled legacy in Bangladesh." Reviewer Arunava Sinha said it was "probably the strangest novel to come out of Bangladesh." He went on to say, "Rich with political statements, this is a novel that achieves its intent in a remarkably creative and artistic manner."

On their Limelight page, Telegraph India wrote, "The Black Coat is a political and social commentary under the guise of a historical novel." The paper said through this novel Imam had begun the "Bangla Moment" in South Asian literature in English, i.e., after Indian and Pakistani writers, it was now time for Bangladeshi writers to go international.

In a feature, bdnews24 said with this novel, Imam has boosted up the tradition set up by Monica Ali (famous for her novel Brick Lane) and Tahmima Anam (whose novel A Golden Age received the prize for the Best First Book in the Commonwealth Writers' Prize 2008) and "joined the growing band of Bangladeshis making a mark writing in the language of the former colonial masters."

In a live discussion on Radio Canada, entitled "Controverse littéraire au Bangladesh" (Literary controversy in Bangladesh), Quebec journalist and author Frédérick Lavoie said The Black Coat "slays Sheikh Mujib." Lavoie mentioned that against the popular history of Bangladesh, The Black Coat proposed an alternative history and focused a critical light on Sheikh Mujib's legacy.

The Sunday Guardian highly praised the novel on 13 June 2013. In a review entitled "In the famine-ravaged fields of Bangla, we are all Mujib," Aditya Mani Jha wrote, "The last time I read a novel which affected my idea of the past to this extent was The Blind Assassin, and that was about three times the length of Imam's book. I suspect that The Black Coat will be used – again and again – as the gold standard for any book which seeks to engage with South Asian politics or history."

In a review entitled "From euphoria to disillusion," Bangladeshi newspaper the Daily Star called the novel "a poignant political tale." In writing the book, it said, "Imam has shown a lot of courage in dealing with one of the most tumultuous and controversial phases of independent Bangladesh's history."

Literary Consultancy of London showcased the novel as part of their "Author of the Month" program in May 2013.

== Controversy ==
In a major article in Bangla entitled "Blackmailing the Black Coat?", Imam was accused of stigmatising the name of Sheikh Mujibur Rahman.

Another major article in Bangla alleged that Imam had exceeded all previous indigenous and foreign critics of Sheikh Mujib in that he had sympathised with the Islamic fundamentalists of the country by criticising the tribunal set by the government of the Awami League to try the collaborators of Pakistan during the war of independence.

== See also ==
- Noor Hossain (activist)
- Shah Abdul Karim
- 7th March Speech of Sheikh Mujibur Rahman
- Mujib Coat
