= A Golden Age =

Novel by Tahmima Anam

- Author: Tahmima Anam
- Language: English
- Genre: Historical novel, War novel
- Publisher: John Murray (UK)
- Publication date: March 2007 (UK)
- Publication place: United Kingdom
- Media type: Print (Hardback)
- ISBN: 0-7195-6010-1
- OCLC: 181926640
- Followed by: The Good Muslim

A Golden Age is the first novel of the Bangladesh-born writer Tahmima Anam. It tells the story of the Bangladesh War of Liberation through the eyes of one family. The novel was awarded the prize for Best First Book in the Commonwealth Writers' Prize 2008. It was also shortlisted for the 2007 Guardian First Book Award. The first chapter of the novel appeared in the January 2007 edition of Granta magazine.

In 2022, the novel was included on the "Big Jubilee Read" list of 70 books by Commonwealth authors, selected to celebrate the Platinum Jubilee of Elizabeth II.

== Synopsis ==
This historical fiction novel centers the point of view of Rehana Haque, a widowed mother who struggles through Bangladesh Liberation War as both her children become increasingly involved with the war efforts. The book starts with the death of Rehana's husband and losing then regaining the custody of her children, and then fast forwards to the start of the war where Rehana struggles again to hold on to her children. Rehana struggles with understanding passionate nationalism of her children and finding her own personal identity outside of being a mother and where her sense of nationalism fits into that identity. The book ends 16 December 1971, the day that the treaty is signed and Bangladesh gained their independence.

== Main characters ==
- Rehana Haque: Main character; Widow and mother. She grew up in Calcutta, India in poverty after her father, an Indian aristocratic lost their fortune from bad luck and worse advice. She moves to East Pakistan after the marriage to Iqbal Haque. Her native tongue is Urdu.
- Sohail: Rehana's son, university student, joins the Mukti Bahini as a guerilla fighter.
- Maya: Rehana's daughter, university student, moves to Kolkata to be a journalist for the freedom fighters.
- Mrs. Chowdhury: Rehana's friend and neighbor
- Silvi: Mrs. Chowdhury's daughter and a love interest of Sohail's
- Sharmeen: Maya's friend who was captured by the Pakistan army and kept at the cantonment in Dhaka and raped repeatedly. She and her unborn child died in the hospital.
- Iqbal Haque: Rehana's dead husband
- The Major: Guerrilla commander, injured in secret operation and brought to Rehana's house to be nursed back to health by Rehana and then becomes Rehana's love interest.
- Sabeer: Silvi's fiancé, Pakistan soldier turned freedom fighter for Bengali
- Mr. and Mrs. Sengupta: Rehana's Hindu tenants at Shona
- Mrs. Rahman and Mrs. Akram: Rehana's neighbours and fellow 'sewing sisters'
- Faiz Haque: Rehana's brother in law, works with the Pakistan army.
- Parveen Haque: Faiz's wife. She cannot have children so works to have Rehana seen as unfit after the death of Iqbal so that she can get custody of Sohail and Maya.

== Background ==
=== Inspiration ===
The author Tahmima Anam was born in Bangladesh, but grew up traveling around the world due to the work of her father, Mahfuz Anam, who is the editor of The Daily Star.

The author was inspired by her family's personal experience of their role in the Bangladesh Independence war. She grew up listening to the stories of her grandmother harboring freedom fighters and hiding guns and weapons in the family garden.

This led the author to be inspired to write about everyday citizens' war experience and small, but meaningful ways they can become revolutionaries.

=== Historical context ===
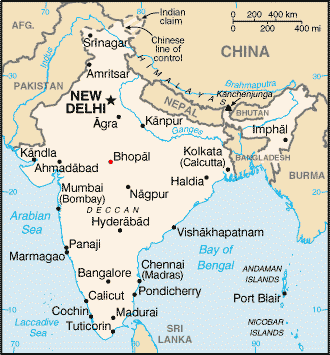
Map of Pakistan, India, and Bangladesh

Bangladesh was known as East Pakistan before its fight for independence from Pakistan in the Bangladesh Liberation War.

East Pakistan was formed when British rule ended in India and Pakistan was formed in 1947. The territories were situated on either side of India as the book phrases "a pair of horns" on either side of India. This large separation between the two territories led to East Pakistan to be treated like a colony. The West controlled the political majority and economic distribution of both territories. There were also major cultural differences between the two territories. Pakistan mainly practiced Islam and spoke Urdu. Whereas East Pakistan had both Muslim and Hindu populations and spoke mainly Bengali. The inequality, neglect, and differences led to the unrest in East Pakistan. The call for independence from West Pakistan led to the Bangladesh Liberation War.

The mounting Bengali nationalist movement led to the Pakistan army to carry out Operation Searchlight. This military operation targeted Bengali intellectuals, academics including university students, and Hindus. They were captured, tortured, and/or killed. This led to the 1971 Bangladesh genocide that caused millions of refugees to flee to India and the deaths of 58,000 to 3,000,000 civilians. The exact number of deaths is still unknown.

The book features the attacks on the city of Dhaka during Operation Searchlight. Rehana's children escape the attacks on Dhaka University due to an engagement party for Silvi.

The next day 26 March 1971 the Mukti Bahini called for independence from Pakistan and establishment of the new country of Bangladesh. The civil war began in full force.

Though the Indian military was already pumping the Bengalis against West Pakistan, the Bengali efforts bore fruit when the Indian Army intervened in December 1971 on the side of the Bengali, Pakistan gave Independence to East Pakistan on 16 December 1971, and thus Bangladesh came into being.

== Themes ==
=== Motherhood ===
Rehana's whole adult life has centered around her children. As a young widow she fights to regain custody of her children after losing them to her late husband's brother and wife. As her children get older Rehana struggles to relate to them. The struggle to relate intensifies as the tension in East Pakistan increased and then the war starts and their passion for Bengali leads to their involvement and support for the war. Rehana then must struggle to keep her children safe. She would do and sacrifice anything for her children and does by the end of the book. This affliction leads Rehana to struggle with finding her own identity outside of motherhood.

=== Nationalism ===
Growing up with two parents that had been involved with the Bangladesh Liberation War, patriotism was important to Anam's family. This theme is reflected in the book.

Throughout the book Rehana struggles with her feelings toward Bangladesh. Rehana grew up in Calcutta and then left to west Pakistan after her marriage and her native tongue became Urdu, Rehana does not feel the same sense of nationalism as her children.

Sohail and Maya were born in Dhaka and their native tongue is Bengali and have an easy loyalty to Bangladesh. She must search within herself if she believes in the war and finding independence for Bangladesh. Rehana finds her nationalism within her own experiences and those she loves that have brought the idea of the nation of Bangladesh to hold significance for her.

=== Women's experience in war ===
Rehana's story shows the often forgotten experience of women in war. Rehana must bear the deepest part of her soul to save her children. This includes giving up the man she grows to love to save her son and herself. This story reveals that while a women's role in war is different, they too do not come out untouched.

== Publication ==
The book was originally published in the United Kingdom by Canongate Books, and then later published in the United States by HarperCollins. Its original release date was 8 January 2007, and it has been translated into 22 languages.

== Critical reception ==
Clemency Burton-Hill of The Guardian described the book as a "stunning debut"; David Robson from The Sunday Telegraph described its beginning as the struggle of a new author, but the story turns "into a real page-turner, with a bravura, heart-stopping ending"; and Theo Chapman from The Sydney Morning Herald called the book a "thought-provoking work and a rewarding read".

The book has, however, received some criticism for having factual inaccuracies. This includes citing the 1963 film Cleopatra before it was released which left some critics questioning some of the liberties that Anam took with the fictional characters and telling of the story.

== Awards ==
- Winner of the Commonwealth Writers' Prize Best First Book (2008)
- Shortlisted for Costa First Novel Award (2007)
- Shortlisted for The Guardian First Book Award (2007)

== See also ==
- The Bones of Grace
