= The Bones of Grace =

2016 novel by Tahmima Anam

- First edition (UK)
- Author: Tahmima Anam
- Language: English
- Genre: Historical novel, Romance novel, Domestic fiction
- Publisher: Canongate (UK); HarperCollins (US)
- Publication date: 5 March 2016
- Publication place: United Kingdom
- Pages: 432
- ISBN: 9781554682119
- OCLC: 968201661
- Preceded by: The Good Muslim

The Bones of Grace is a novel by Tahmima Anam. It is the third novel and final part of her Bengal trilogy, following A Golden Age and The Good Muslim.

== Synopsis ==
The story revolves around Zubaida Haque, an adopted daughter of a native Bengali family who finds herself lost between two worlds. She feels torn by everything which she has to choose. She feels a different kind of loyalty toward her motherland Bangladesh and America, where she completed her studies.

== Reception ==
The book got generally positive review from critics.

The Guardian published a review by Anthony Cummins, who stated: "While the characters need no convincing of their feelings for each other, we do, and the book’s structure makes this tricky: Zubaida has to write for us as well as for Elijah. Their coded correspondence once she returns to Bangladesh, in text messages consisting only of song titles – off-the-peg emotion – feels like Anam's workaround as much as theirs". The Financial Times published a review by Arifa Akbar, who noted: "This third novel does not revisit the 1970s but plays with a polyphony of pasts, from prehistoric to the present. The parents’ story of war and liberation is there, but as a back-note. The foreground is now contemporary, the generation Anam's own, and The Bones of Grace has at its heart not war but the shattering effects of conflicted love".

Kirkus Reviews said: "Taken alone, the narrator's self-absorption would be grating, but her story resonates powerfully within the saga of three generations of women personifying Bangladesh’s evolution from the clarity of revolution to the confusions of assimilation with the larger world". Book Review published a review that observed: "Anam writes an engaging, thought provoking story that portrays a contemporary family experience in Bangladesh; one that examines the issue of identity and living between east and western cultures. "

The Hindu published a review by Mini Kapoor, who wrote, "That Anam manages to bring all the strands together in the end speaks of the necessary truth in her fiction". South China Morning Post gave the book 4.5 star out of 5, calling the novel "an unusual, uneven beauty, heart-wrenching sadness and rare imaginative power". The Christian Science Monitor published a review by Terry Hong who calls the book, "a priceless literary gift".

The Star Tribune published a mixed review by Rayyan Al-Shawaf, who wrote, "...you’ll be moved by the author’s portrayal of hollowed-out characters pining for that which would make them whole again, but you might also find yourself puzzling over the nature of their bereavement. Indeed, Anam often skimps on explanation in favor of plunging into someone’s obsessive quest for redemption". Nicholas Reid published a negative review in Stuff.co.nz, where he noted: "At over 400 pages, this is a complex novel with many subordinate characters and many changes of scene. Also it uses big-brush symbolism.The dig for fossilised bones is like Zubaida's dig for her identity etc".
