= The Good Muslim =

2011 novel by Tahmima Anam

- The cover image of The Good Muslim (HarperCollins edition)
- Author: Tahmima Anam
- Language: English
- Genre: Historical novel, Romance novel, Domestic fiction
- Publisher: HarperCollins
- Publication date: August 2, 2011
- Publication place: United Kingdom
- Media type: Print (Hardcover, Paperback)
- Pages: 304
- ISBN: 978-0-06-147876-5
- OCLC: 701243911
- Preceded by: A Golden Age
- Followed by: The Bones of Grace

The Good Muslim is a novel by Tahmima Anam. This novel is a sequel to her debut novel A Golden Age and spans the year from 1984 to 1985, with occasional flashbacks to the aftermath of the Bangladesh Liberation War in 1971. It is a story about faith and family shadowed by a war. The family that has taken active part in the war of independence has now to face the challenges of peace, within and outside.

== Plot summary ==
The central characters of the novel are Maya and Sohail. While A Golden Age tells their story before and during the liberation war of Bangladesh, The Good Muslim tells their story a decade after the war.

In 1984, Maya returns home after almost a decade of absence and finds her beloved brother Sohail completely transformed. She still has the same revolutionary zeal, but Sohail has resorted to religiosity in its puritanical form and has become a charismatic religious leader, reflective of Bangladesh under the regime of General Hussain Muhammad Ershad, the President and dictator of Bangladesh who has promoted Islam over secularism. The ideological difference between Sohail and his sister creates a deep-seated schism in their minds. This difference is the central conflict in The Good Muslim. They have charted their own ways, opposite to each other's, of moving forward in the shadow of the tortuous history. Maya is a liberal-minded ‘village doctor’ who helps women victims of war. She performs abortions so that the women who had conceived as a result of rape do not have to carry the stigma. Thus she witnesses misery all the time, everywhere. Sohail's way of being a good Muslim is altogether different from his sister's. He has embraced a version of Islam as defined by the Tablighi Jamaat, which shuns the joyful life filled with music, friends and liberal values. Sohail wants to send his son to a madrasa and, as a result, a conflict ensues between them and comes to a devastating climax.

== Critical reception ==
Initial reviews for the Good Muslim are mostly positive. Valerie Miner of the Los Angeles Times said "The Good Muslim brims with gripping narrative, absorbing history and Shakespearean moral conundrums ... a timely drama about the unpredictable effects of religious zealotry and political violence as well as a keen examination of survival and forgiveness." Praising the novel, The Guardian said "Powerful and ambitious, The Good Muslim more than fulfills the promises of Tahmima Anam's celebrated debut, A Golden Age". In a starred review Publishers Weekly said praising the narrative technique of Anam that in a "gripping and beautifully written" novel, "from historical, political, and social tragedy, Anam has fashioned a mesmerizing story capturing a culture and a time". According to Ophelia Field of The Daily Telegraph, this second part of Anam's "projected trilogy" which begins with A Golden Age "confirms Anam as one of our most important novelists."

It was shortlisted for the 2013 DSC Prize for South Asian Literature.
