= Shazia Omar =

Bangladeshi novelist

Shazia Omar is a Bangladeshi novelist. Her debut novel, Like a Diamond in the Sky, was published by Penguin India and Zubaan in 2009. The novel dealt with drug abuse. She studied at Dartmouth College and the London School of Economics.

She is also a social psychologist, a development professional and a yoga instructor.

== Work ==
- Dark Diamond (2016)
- Intentional Smile: A Girl's Guide to Positive Living (2013)
- Like a Diamond in the Sky (2009)
