= Zia Haider Rahman =

British novelist and broadcaster

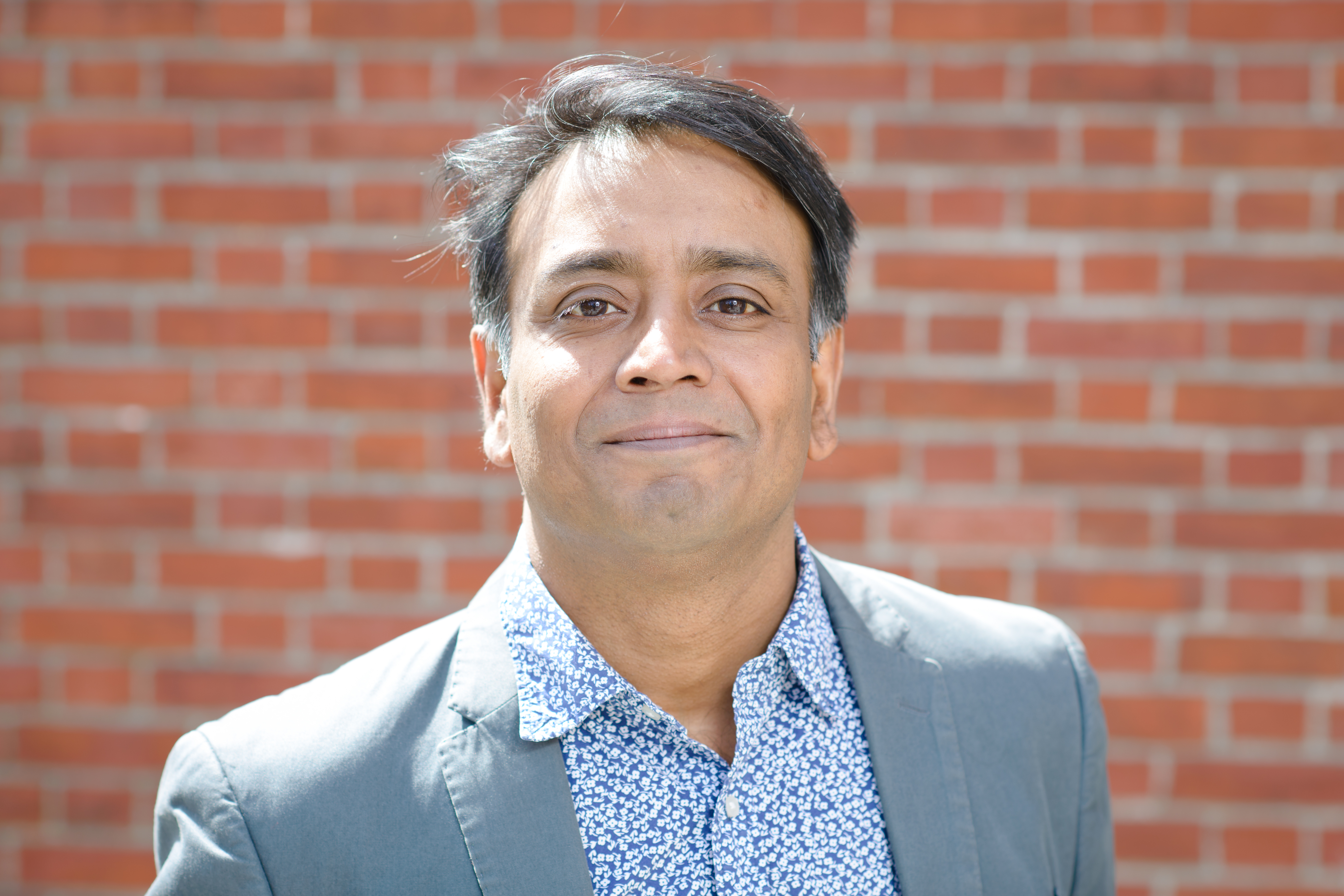
- Cambridge, Massachusetts, 2018
- Born: Bangladesh
- Education: University of Oxford; University of Cambridge; Yale University; Stiftung Maximilianeum
- Writing career
- Notable awards: James Tait Black Memorial Prize; Harvard University, Radcliffe Fellowship; New America, Eric and Wendy Schmidt Fellowship; Dartmouth College, Montgomery Fellowship; Southern New Hampshire University, Honorary Doctorate
- Website: www.ziahaiderrahman.com

Zia Haider Rahman (/ˈziːə ˈhaɪdər ˈrɑːmən/) is a British novelist, broadcaster, and lawyer. His novel In the Light of What We Know was published in 2014 to international critical acclaim and translated into many languages. He was awarded the James Tait Black Memorial Prize, Britain’s oldest literary prize, previous winners of which include Evelyn Waugh, Graham Greene, J. M. Coetzee, Nadine Gordimer, Angela Carter, Salman Rushdie and Cormac McCarthy.

== Biography ==
Rahman was born in Bangladesh in the region of Sylhet. His mother tongue is Bengali. His family moved to England when Rahman was small, where they were squatters in a derelict building before being moved to a council estate. His father was a bus conductor and waiter and his mother a seamstress. He attended Hampstead School in London. In an interview with Guernica, he said that he "grew up in poverty, in some of the worst conditions in a developed economy."

Rahman was a college scholar at Balliol College, one of the constituent colleges at the University of Oxford, and received a first-class honours degree in mathematics before completing further studies in mathematics, economics, and law at the Maximilianeum, a foundation for gifted students, and LMU Munich, the University of Cambridge, and Yale University. He briefly worked as an investment banker for Goldman Sachs in New York before practising as a corporate lawyer and then as an international human rights lawyer with the Open Society Foundations, focusing on grand corruption in Africa. He has also worked as an anti-corruption activist for Transparency International in South Asia.

== Work ==
In the Light of What We Know, a novel, received plaudits internationally, earning high praise from literary critics such as James Wood, Joyce Carol Oates, Louise Adler, and Amitava Kumar. The novel appeared in numerous end of year "Best of" lists. According to Rahman, most of the book was written at Yaddo in upstate New York.

Rahman's writing has appeared in The New York Times, The Guardian, The New York Review of Books and elsewhere. He is a contributor to A Point of View, a long-running weekly radio show broadcast on BBC Radio 4 to an audience of over a million. He is also a documentary maker. Rahman is a critic of liberal elites. From an interview with Rahman in The New York Review of Books:

"There are so few class migrants into the liberal elites. When I was on the road at literary festivals promoting my novel, more than once I was told I really ought to meet [novelists] Mohsin Hamid or Kamila Shamsie. I’m not naive: liberal elites see race before class and are blind to the gulf between my background and the highly privileged one of the likes of Hamid, who attended Aitchison College, Pakistan’s Eton."

He is now working on a nonfiction book proposal, a memoir, that would explore this theme — of a liberal who has issues with liberals.

Rahman led a project at Harvard University using machine learning, network science, and publicly available data to map the world's elites and their political, business and social interrelationships, with the mission of raising transparency in the public space.

== Honours ==
In August 2015, Rahman was awarded the James Tait Black Memorial Prize, Britain’s oldest literary prize, previous winners of which include E. M. Forster, D. H. Lawrence, Evelyn Waugh, Graham Greene, Nadine Gordimer, Salman Rushdie, Jonathan Franzen, J. M. Coetzee and Iris Murdoch.

Fellowships Rahman received include the Walter Jackson Bate Fellowship at the Radcliffe Institute for Advanced Study, Harvard University, a Montgomery Fellowship at Dartmouth College, an Eric and Wendy Schmidt Fellowship at New America, a Senior Fellowship of the Bruno Kreisky Forum, Vienna, and the Michael & Nina Sundell and James Silberman & Selma Shapiro Fellowships at Yaddo. He was an affiliate of the Berkman Klein Center for Internet & Society at Harvard and was invited to a Director’s Visitorship at the Institute for Advanced Study in Princeton, New Jersey.

Rahman delivered many public lectures, including a Montgomery Fellowship Lecture 2020, Dartmouth College; the 2018 Reckford Lecture in European Studies at the University of North Carolina at Chapel Hill (previously delivered by Leon Botstein, Robert Pinsky and Mark Mazower); and the 2015 Ashok Kumar Sarkar Memorial Lecture at the Kolkata Book Fair. He has also spoken at the Institute for Advanced Study, Princeton, Yale University, Columbia University, NYU, London School of Economics, the University of Oxford, and at numerous literary festivals around the world. In 2014, he replaced V. S. Naipaul as keynote speaker at the Ubud Writers and Readers Festival.

During 2016, he was writer in residence at the University of Amsterdam, and was awarded the inaugural International Ranald MacDonald Award.

In 2017, Rahman received an honorary doctorate from Southern New Hampshire University, where he subsequently spent a year as a visiting professor.

Rahman sat on several judging panels for international and American prizes and fellowships. In 2018, he was appointed a judge of the Neustadt International Prize for Literature. He joined Maureen Freely, Antonia Fraser, Vicky Featherstone and Peter Stothard as a judge of the 2016 PEN Pinter Prize, established in 2009 in memory of Nobel Laureate playwright and poet Harold Pinter, which the panel awarded to Margaret Atwood. In connection with the PEN Pinter Prize, Rahman authored a widely cited op-ed, published by The New York Times, exploring how British authors of color are identified by British literary elites.
