= Tahmima Anam =

British writer, novelist, and columnist (born 1975)

- তাহমিমা আনাম
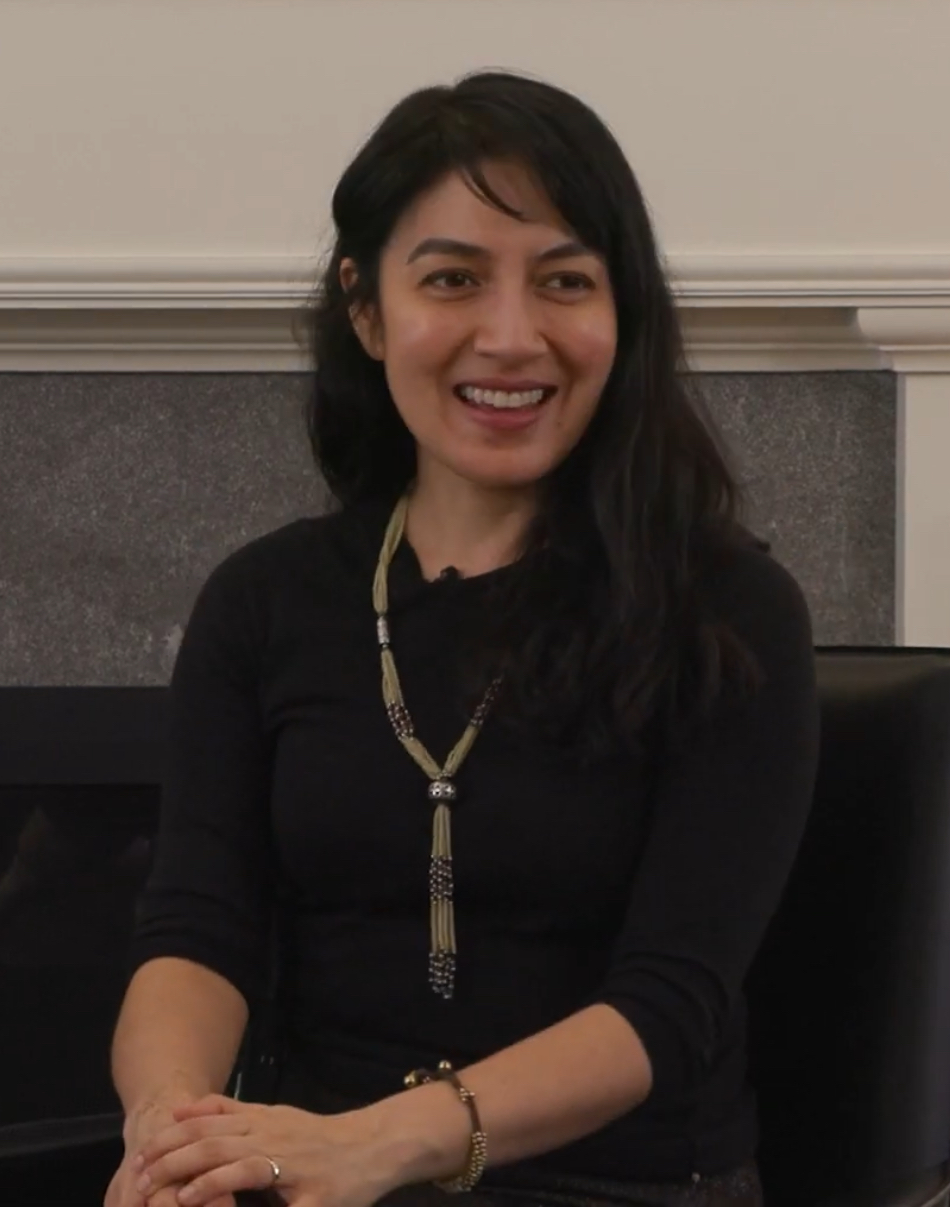
- Anam in 2023
- Born: 8 October 1975 (age 51); Dhaka, Bangladesh
- Citizenship: British
- Education: Mount Holyoke College (BA); Royal Holloway, University of London (MA); Harvard University (PhD)
- Occupations: Writer, novelist, columnist
- Spouse: Roland O. Lamb (m. 2010)
- Relatives: Mahfuz Anam (father); Shaheen Anam (mother); Abul Mansur Ahmed (paternal grandfather)
- Writing career
- Language: English
- Years active: 2007–present
- Notable works: A Golden Age; The Good Muslim; The Bones of Grace

Tahmima Anam (Bengali: তাহমিমা আনাম; born 8 October 1975) is a Bangladeshi-born British writer, novelist and columnist. Her first novel, A Golden Age (2007), was the Best First Book winner of the 2008 Commonwealth Writers' Prizes. Her follow-up novel, The Good Muslim, was nominated for the 2011 Man Asian Literary Prize. She is the granddaughter of Abul Mansur Ahmed and daughter of Mahfuz Anam.

== Early life ==
Anam was born on 8 October 1975 in Dhaka to Mahfuz Anam and Shaheen Anam. At the age of two, she moved to Paris when her parents joined UNESCO as employees. She grew up in Paris, New York, and Bangkok, where she learned the story of the Bangladesh Liberation War from her parents.

== Education ==
At the age of 17, Anam received a scholarship for Mount Holyoke College, from which she graduated in 1997. She earned a PhD in anthropology from Harvard University in 2005 for her thesis "Fixing the Past: War, Violence, and Habitations of Memory in Post-Independence Bangladesh". Later, she completed her Master of Arts in Creative Writing at Royal Holloway, University of London.

== Career ==
In March 2007, Anam's first novel, A Golden Age, was published by John Murray. Inspired by her parents, she set the novel during the Bangladesh Liberation War. It was a finalist for the Costa First Novel Award. The novel tells the story of a woman named Rehana Haque during the Bangladesh War of Independence in 1971. She had also researched the war during her post-graduation career. For the benefit of her research, she stayed in Bangladesh for two years and interviewed hundreds of freedom fighters, known as Mukti Bahini. She also worked on the set of Tareque and Catherine Masud’s critically acclaimed film Matir Moina (The Clay Bird), reflecting the war.

Anam's second novel, The Good Muslim, published in 2011, is a sequel to A Golden Age and deals with the aftermath of the war. It was long listed for the Man Asian Literary Prize. In 2013, Anam was named one of Granta's "Best of Young British Novelists". In 2015, her short story "Garments", inspired by the Rana Plaza building collapse, was published and won the O. Henry Award and was shortlisted for the BBC National Short Story Award. In the same year, she became a judge for the Man Booker International Prize 2016.

In 2016, Anam's novel The Bones of Grace was published by HarperCollins. The following year, she was elected a Fellow of the Royal Society of Literature. Anam's op-ed pieces have been published in The New York Times, The Guardian and in the New Statesman. In these, Anam has written about Bangladesh and its growing problems.

In 2021, Anam's novel The Startup Wife was published by Canongate Books. It was selected as a Best Book of 2021 by the Observer, Stylist, Cosmopolitan, Red and the Daily Mail, and was shortlisted for the Comedy Women in Print Prize 2022.

In 2022, Anam gave a TEDx talk entitled "The Power of Holding Silence: Making the Workplace Work for Women". That same year, Anam's debut, A Golden Age, was chosen for Queen Elizabeth II's platinum jubilee book list, a list of 70 books from across the Commonwealth marking the seven decades of her reign.

In 2026, Anam published her fifth novel, Uprising, described in The Guardian as "a fiery novel of female rebellion".

Anam's next novel, Good Books, is due out in 2028. The book is also being adapted for television with writer-producer Alison Brown.

== Personal life ==
In 2010, Anam married American inventor Roland O. Lamb, whom she met at Harvard University. The couple has a son named Rumi. Rumi was born premature and, for five years, refused to eat – an ordeal Anam has written about. As of 2011, she lived in London.

== Bibliography ==
=== Books ===
- A Golden Age. John Murray. 2007. ISBN 978-0-7195-6010-1.
- The Good Muslim. HarperCollins. 2011. ISBN 978-0-06-147876-5.
- The Bones of Grace. HarperCollins. 2016. ISBN 978-0-06-147894-9.
- The Startup Wife. Canongate Books. 2021. ISBN 978-1-83885-248-1.
- Uprising. Canongate Books. 2026. ISBN 978-1837265817.

=== Short stories ===
- "Saving the World". Granta. No. Autumn. London. 2008.
- "Anwar Gets Everything". Granta. No. Spring. London. 2013.
- "Garments". Freeman's. No. Fall 2015. London. 2015.

== See also ==
- British Bangladeshi
- List of British Bangladeshis
- List of Muslim writers and poets
