= Neamat Imam =

Canadian-Bangladeshi writer

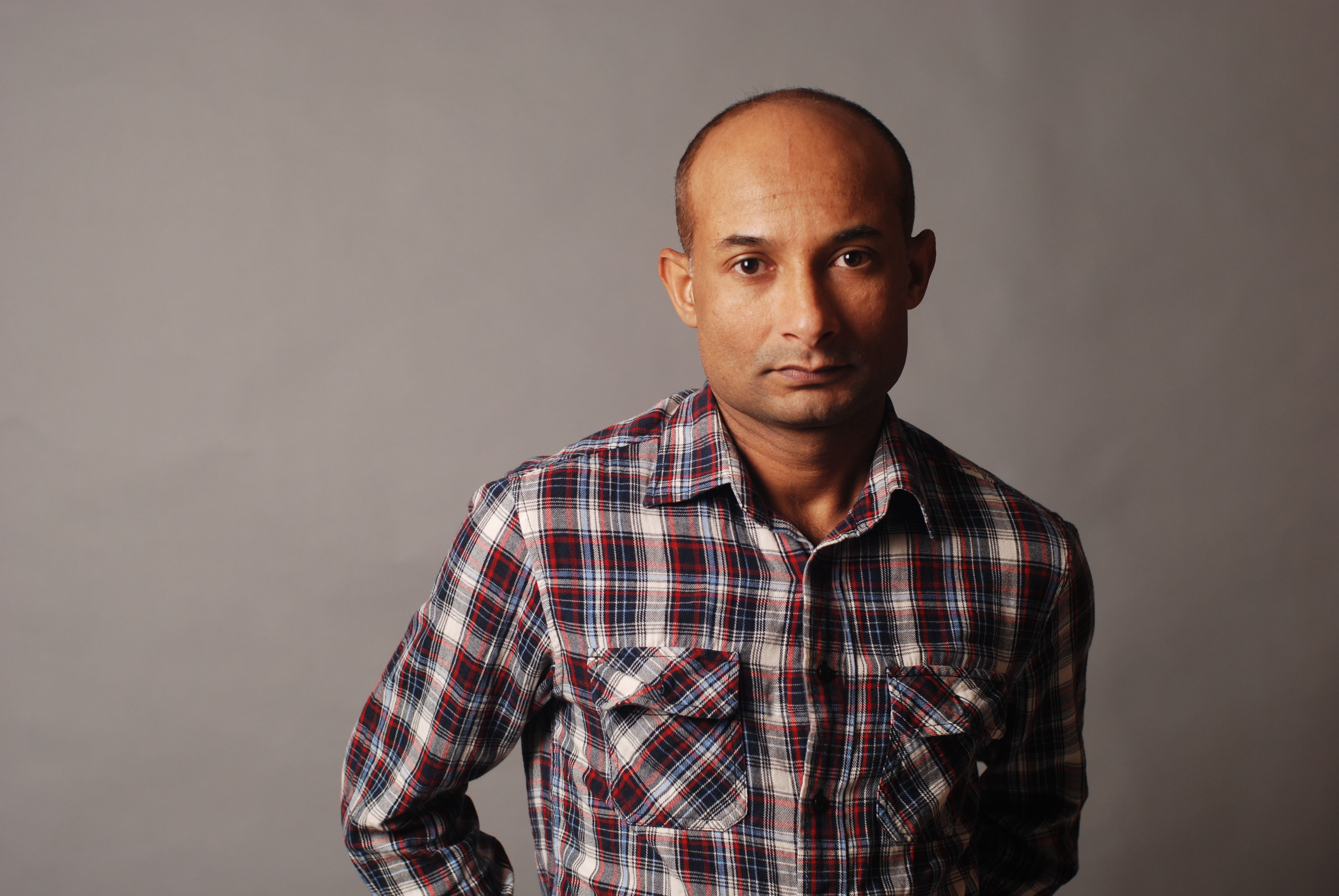
- Born: 5 January 1971 (age 55); Chandpur, East Pakistan
- Citizenship: Bangladesh; Canada
- Education: PhD in Theatre Studies
- Alma mater: Dhaka University; Aristotle University
- Writing career
- Period: 1995–present
- Genres: Drama, historical fiction, short fiction, novel
- Notable work: The Black Coat
- Website: neamatimam.com

Neamat Imam (Bengali: নেয়ামত ইমাম; born 5 January 1971) is a Bangladeshi-Canadian author of literary fiction. His first novel, The Black Coat, a Quill & Quire Book of the Year 2016, was published by Penguin Books India from its Hamish Hamilton imprint in 2013. It is considered the "gold standard for any book which seeks to engage with South Asian politics or history" and a "future classic." He has also authored 2 plays, 2 novellas, and a collection of poetry in Bengali language.

== Biography ==
Imam was born in a small agricultural village under the district of Chandpur in Bangladesh. It was a village which had no school, no shops, post-office, mosque and no electricity, for which his lessons in alphabet began in the light of a lantern. His father was an elementary schoolteacher and his mother a housewife. He lost his mother when he was 8 and his father when he was 15. Third among four children of his parents, he was raised by his elder brother and elder sister who were senior to him only by a few years. He first saw a newspaper that his brother brought from his office when he was 13 and sat before a TV set for the first time when he was 14.

== Work ==
=== Reception ===
In the first major book review for Outlook India, Indian author Indrajit Hazra called The Black Coat "an extraordinary book ... a fine work of fiction." In his review, entitled "Father And Sons, Or The Lie of the Land," Hazra added, "Very few novels examine a period in history so convincingly even as it turns away from the standard style of historical fiction. Imam does this in this hyper-realistic tale of fools, thugs, dangerous idealism and sanctified pretence, reminding us who have forgotten a secret function of the novel: to unsettle us, instead of just be moving."

Mint, India's business newspaper, called the book "a powerful fictional revisiting of Sheikh Mujibur Rahman’s troubled legacy in Bangladesh." Reviewer Arunava Sinha went on to say, "Rich with political statements, this is a novel that achieves its intent in a remarkably creative and artistic manner."

It was also reviewed by Deccan Herald, Financial Express, Daily Star, Asian Review of Books, Sunday Guardian, Business Standard and Mail Today. All the journals hugely praised the novel. Asian Review of Books wrote: "Neamat Imam’s first novel, The Black Coat, is pure satire, written with such disarming earnestness that one might neglect to shake it down and dissect its numerous layers". Financial Express commented that it was "one of the best (novels) to come out of the subcontinent in the recent past".

== Publications ==
- 1996. Paravarty Drishwa Bangla Academy: Young Writers Project
- 1997. Elephant Road Osaca
- 1999. Boidik Sandesh
- 2010 Amaar Rashtro Amaar Nagorik Adorsho
- 2013 The Black Coat Penguin Books India
- 2024 Ekti Osommaner Itibritto (The Black Coat: Rewritten in Bengali by Neamat Imam), Afsar Brothers, Dhaka
