= The Prison Diaries =

2017 memoir by Mujibur Rahman

- Author: Sheikh Mujibur Rahman
- Original title: কারাগারের রোজনামচা
- Translator: Fakrul Alam
- Language: Original: Bengali; Other Languages: • English • Asamiya
- Series: Bangabandhu
- Genre: Memoir, Diary, Autobiography
- Published: 2017
- Publisher: Bangla Academy
- Publication date: 17 March
- Publication place: Bangladesh
- Pages: 332
- ISBN: 978-0-470-60264-5
- Preceded by: The Unfinished Memoirs
- Followed by: Amar Dekha Noya Chin

Karagarer Rojnamcha (Bengali: কারাগারের রোজনামচা; English: The Prison Diaries) is the second memoir by Sheikh Mujibur Rahman, the first president of Bangladesh. The Bangla Academy published the book on the occasion of Mujib's 98th birth anniversary.

== Background ==
Mujib used to note his daily life in his personal diary while in jail. Pakistani government seized his six diaries when he was released from jail. Four of them were returned later. In 2009, after the Mujibs' eldest child Sheikh Hasina's government came to power, the remaining two diaries were recovered with the help of the Special Branch. These two diaries are published as Karagarer Rojnamcha. After the publication of the book, the Bangla Academy's Director General Shamsuzzanan Khan handed over the copies of the book to the Mujib's two living children, then prime minister Sheikh Hasina and his younger daughter Sheikh Rehana at Ganabhaban.

== Content ==
In the book/diary, Mujib noted his prison life during the Pakistan regime from 1966 to 1968. He provides a comprehensive account of jail customs and conventions, his political view, and his pain for being separated from his family.
