= The Unfinished Memoirs =

Autobiography by Sheikh Mujibur Rahman, founding father of Bangladesh

- First edition
- Author: Sheikh Mujibur Rahman; Sheikh Hasina (Preface)
- Original title: অসমাপ্ত আত্মজীবনী (Asamapta Atmajibanee)
- Translator: Fakrul Alam
- Cover artist: Qayyum Chowdhury (the original Bengali version)
- Language: Original : Bengali
- Series: Bangabandhu
- Genre: Memoir, Autobiography
- Publisher: The University Press Limited, Penguin Books and Oxford University Press
- Publication date: 12 June 2012; 14 years ago
- Publication place: Bangladesh, India and Pakistan
- Pages: 323
- ISBN: 9789845061100
- Followed by: The Prison Diaries

The Unfinished Memoirs (Bengali: অসমাপ্ত আত্মজীবনী) is the autobiography by Sheikh Mujibur Rahman, First President of Bangladesh.

== Background ==
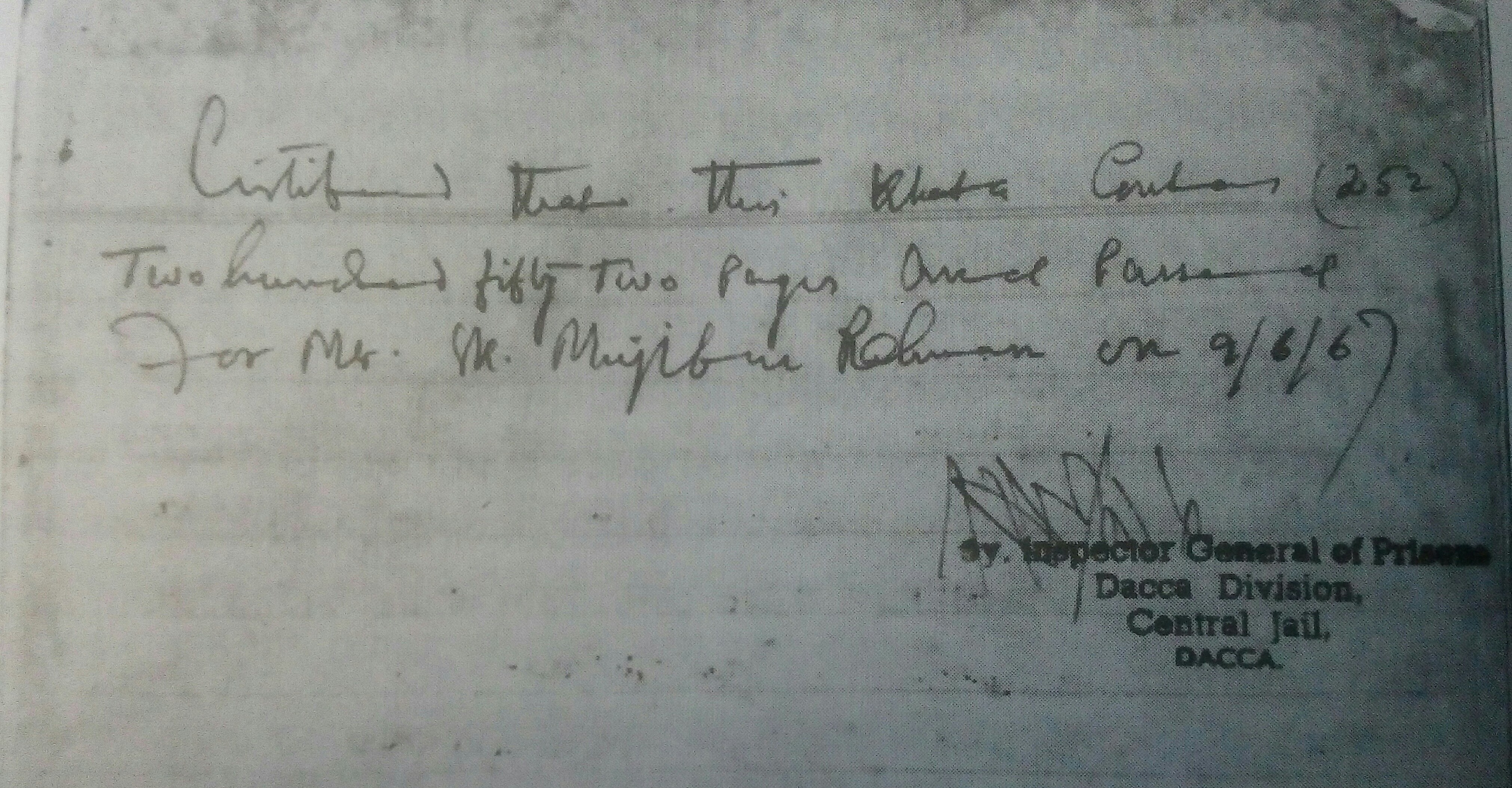
Photograph of a page from The manuscript.

Inspired by his wife, Fazilatunnesa Mujib, Mujib started writing his autobiography in his notebooks during his sojourns in jail as a state prisoner between 1967 and 1969. Later Mujib gave the notebooks to Moni to prepare a typed copy. But after the assassination of Sheikh Mujib and Sheikh Fazlul Haq Moni, the notebooks slid in oblivion and remained so until one of his relatives discovered four notebooks in a drawer of Sheikh Moni in 2004. By then, the notebooks' pages had become discolored and brittle.

The contents of the notebook were extracted by Sheikh Hasina, along with Sheikh Rehana and Baby Maudud. The compiled notes were published as a book on 12 June 2012 by The University Press Limited. The book was named by Rehana and prefaced by Hasina. It has since been translated into fourteen languages. On 7 October 2020, a braille version of the book was released.

== Content ==
In his memoirs, Mujib portrayed vividly many aspects of his life in and out of prison. Mujib also narrated the beginning of his ancestry, birth and childhood, days in school and college, and social and political involvements. Mujib also recounted the historical events that he closely observed as a political activist before and after the India partition – famine, communal riots in Kolkata and Bihar, partition, politics of Kolkata-centric State Muslim Student League and Muslim League, Pakistan central government's discriminatory attitude. It also chronicles Bengali language movement, the first stirrings of the movement for autonomy and independence, and powerfully conveys the great uncertainties as well as the great hopes that the Bengali nation had at that time. Mujib expressed his views on other prominent leaders of the time, including Maulana Bhashani, Yar Mohammad Khan, Mahatma Gandhi, Muhammad Ali Jinnah, Liaquat Ali Khan, Huseyn Shaheed Suhrawardy, A.K. Fazlul Haq, Abul Hashim, Khawaja Nazimuddin, Ghulam Muhammad, Mohammad Ali Bogra, Chaudhury Muhammad Ali, and Nurul Amin. The last part portrays the events accompanying the struggle for democratic rights in 1955.

== Reception ==
The Hindustan Times expressed some dissatisfaction over its unfinished status and wished the book could have had more information on the Bangladesh Liberation War instead of ending much sooner in the 1950s. The Prothom Alo wrote that shows the making of Bangabandhu. The Wire wrote that it portrayed the life of early Bangladesh as it portrayed the life of Sheikh Mujibur Rahman.

== Criticism ==
In August 2025, some documents were found in Bangladesh police's special branch SB, where it is mentioned that, Mohammad Javed Patwary was the actual writer of the book on behalf of Sheikh Hasina.
