= Sheikh Mujibur Rahman's 1974 speech at the United Nations =

Speech by Bangladesh's prime minister

- Part of the 29th session of the United Nations General Assembly
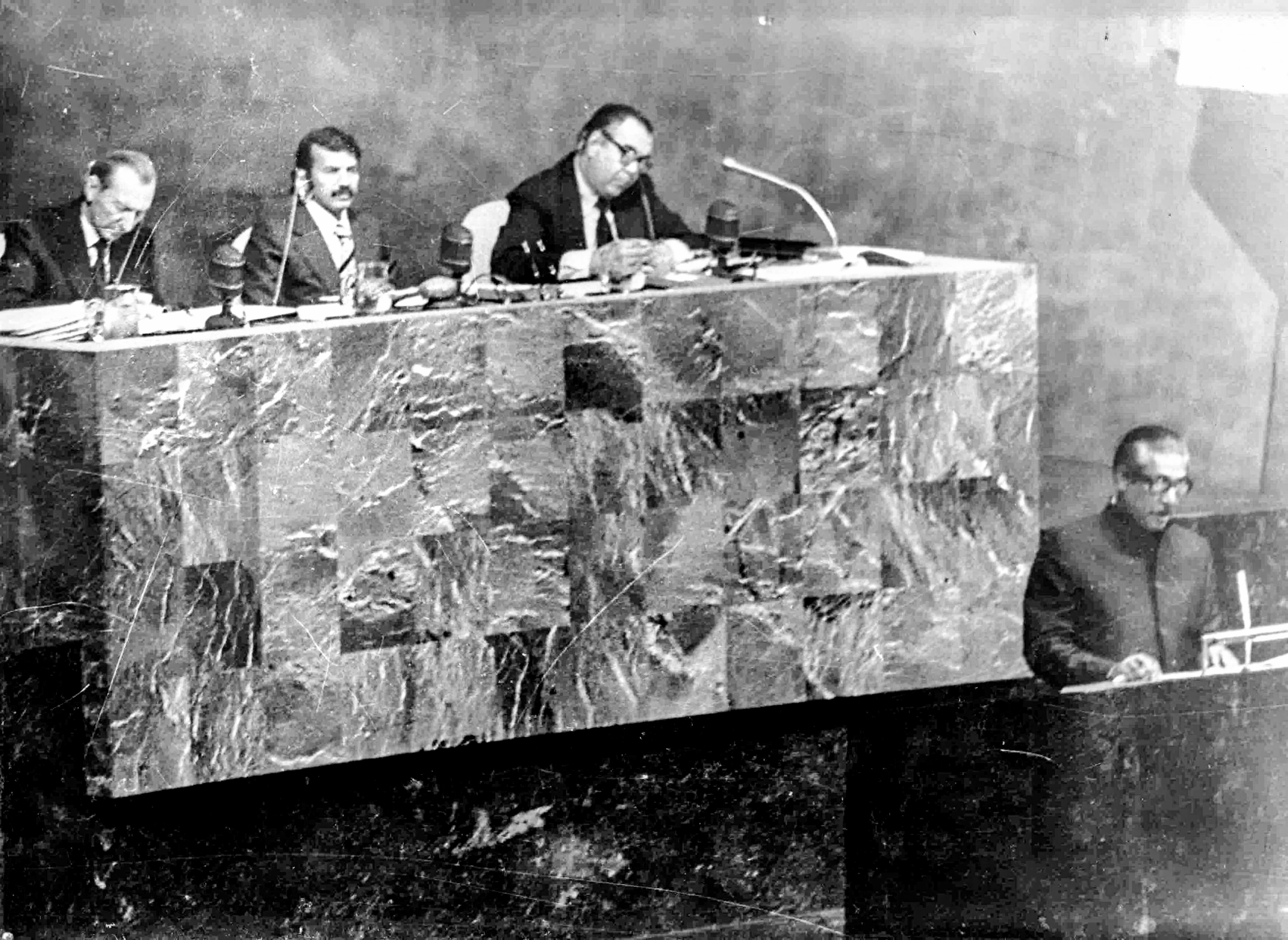
- Sheikh Mujibur Rahman delivering his speech
- Native name: ১৯৭৪-এ জাতিসংঘে শেখ মুজিবুর রহমানের ভাষণ
- Date: 25 September 1974
- Time: 3:00–3:10 p.m. (UTC−4)
- Venue: United Nations General Assembly Hall
- Location: Headquarters of the United Nations, New York City, United States
- Type: Speech
- Theme: Bangladesh's full membership in the United Nations

On 25 September 1974, Bangladeshi Prime Minister Sheikh Mujibur Rahman delivered a speech at the United Nations General Assembly Hall in New York City to the member states' representatives at the General Assembly session. It was the first speech at the United Nations to be given in Bengali, and took place during a period of depression and famine in Bangladesh. The anniversary of the speech has been observed in the U.S. state of New York as Bangladeshi Immigration Day since 2019.

== Background ==
Sheikh Mujibur Rahman, founder and first president of Bangladesh, preferred to deliver speeches in Bengali (his mother tongue and the native language of East Pakistan, previously East Bengal). At the 1952 Asia and Pacific Rim Peace Conference, held in China, he gave an official speech as the Pakistani representative in his native language instead of English. Rahman insisted on the language at all levels. When the province became independent from Pakistan as the People's Republic of Bangladesh after the Bangladesh Liberation War, he (as prime minister) formed a committee to popularize the language; Bengali became the country's official language, and Rahman refused to sign official documents written in English.

Bangladesh became a member state of the United Nations on 17 September 1974, three years after its independence. Rahman decided that he would address the United Nations General Assembly in Bengali. Minister of State for Information Taheruddin Thakur wrote a draft of the speech and submitted it to him, but he rejected the draft. Foreign secretary Fakhruddin Ahmed and Faruq Ahmed Choudhury, the deputy high commissioner of Bangladesh posted in the United Kingdom, wrote and presented another draft and showed it to him. Rahman felt that the draft did not address Bangladeshi reality, and edited it to mention the country's food problems.

A team of 24 members (including Rahman) left the Bangladeshi capital of Dacca (present-day Dhaka) by air on the morning of 23 September, two days before the General Assembly session. Rahman informed the assembly that he would deliver the speech in Bengali; Algerian head of state Houari Boumédiène asked him to speak in English, but he refused. At the time, speeches were not made in languages other than Arabic, Chinese, English, French, Russian and Spanish (the official languages of the United Nations).

== Speech ==
Today as I stand before this Assembly I share with you profound satisfaction that the 75 million people of Bangladesh are now represented in this Parliament of Man. For the Bangalee nation this is a historic moment, marking the consummation of the struggle to vindicate its right of self-determination.

— Sheikh Mujibur Rahman

The task of translating of the speech into English was entrusted to Faruq Ahmed Choudhury, who was at the session. Rahman's speech used the motto "friendship with all, enmity with none", which he had adopted as Bangladesh's foreign policy. He highlighted the importance of understanding the reality of peace, humanity, brotherhood and interdependence to solve the global economic crisis, and proposed a uniform global economic system. Rahman said that his country would work to solve a number of issues, and thanked those who helped with Bangladeshi freedom. The speech highlighted the situation in Bangladesh, which was experiencing a depression and famine.

== Reception ==
Rahman's speech was the first in Bengali at the United Nations. It was praised, especially by representatives of third-world member states. UN Secretary-General Kurt Waldheim called the speech "candid and constructive", and British Foreign Secretary James Callaghan described it as "powerful". It was reported that, although attendance at United Nations sessions is generally low, the Assembly Hall was filled with people eager to hear the speech of the newly independent country's prominent founder statesman. According to journalist Santosh Gupta, Rahman established the status of the Bengali language internationally by delivering the speech at the UN General Assembly. Journalist Abdul Gaffar Choudhury compared its promotion of Bengali identity with 1913 Nobel Prize in Literature laureate Rabindranath Tagore.

Indian writer Surjit Dasgupta said that the day of the speech was the greatest day in Rahman's life. According to journalist Syed Badrul Ahsan, the speech made Bengali the only language of the Indian subcontinent which was recognised at the United Nations. Writer and educationalist Syed Manzoorul Islam wrote that in the speech, Rahman elevated Bangladesh's image and indirectly sent a message to Middle Eastern countries which opposed its recognition as a country. According to Islam, Rahman inspired other member states to use their languages instead of the United Nations' official languages in the sessions.

In 2021, in response to criticism from the leaders of Awami League in Jatiya Sangsad for flying the Pakistani flag by the attendees at the venues during Pakistani cricket team in Bangladesh on the occasion of the Golden Jubilee of the Independence of Bangladesh, Harunur Rashid, member of Bangladesh Nationalist Party, called the speech "a historic document of the historic role in building national unity" as it describes Rahman's steps to establish Bangladesh–Pakistan relations.

== Legacy ==
As ex-prime minister of Bangladesh, Sheikh Hasina (Rahman's daughter, inspired by him) made speeches in Bengali at United Nations General Assembly sessions. Since 2019, the anniversary of Rahman's speech has been observed as Bangladeshi Immigration Day in New York. The Bangladeshi Posts and Telecommunications Division released a 2020 postage stamp commemorating the speech, and the government released a commemorative e-poster.

A campaign began to commemorate the day for Mujib Year. A resolution, "United Nations International Year of Dialogue as a Guarantee of Peace, 2023", incorporates a quote ("friendship with all, enmity with none") from Rahman's address; its fourteenth paragraph says, "The General Assembly recognizing the importance of combating poverty, hunger, disease, illiteracy and unemployment, and emphasizing that friendship to all and malice towards none, in the spirit of constructive cooperation, dialogue and mutual understanding, will help to achieve these objectives."
