= Shapla Square, Kushtia =

Panch Rastar Mor Shapla Square
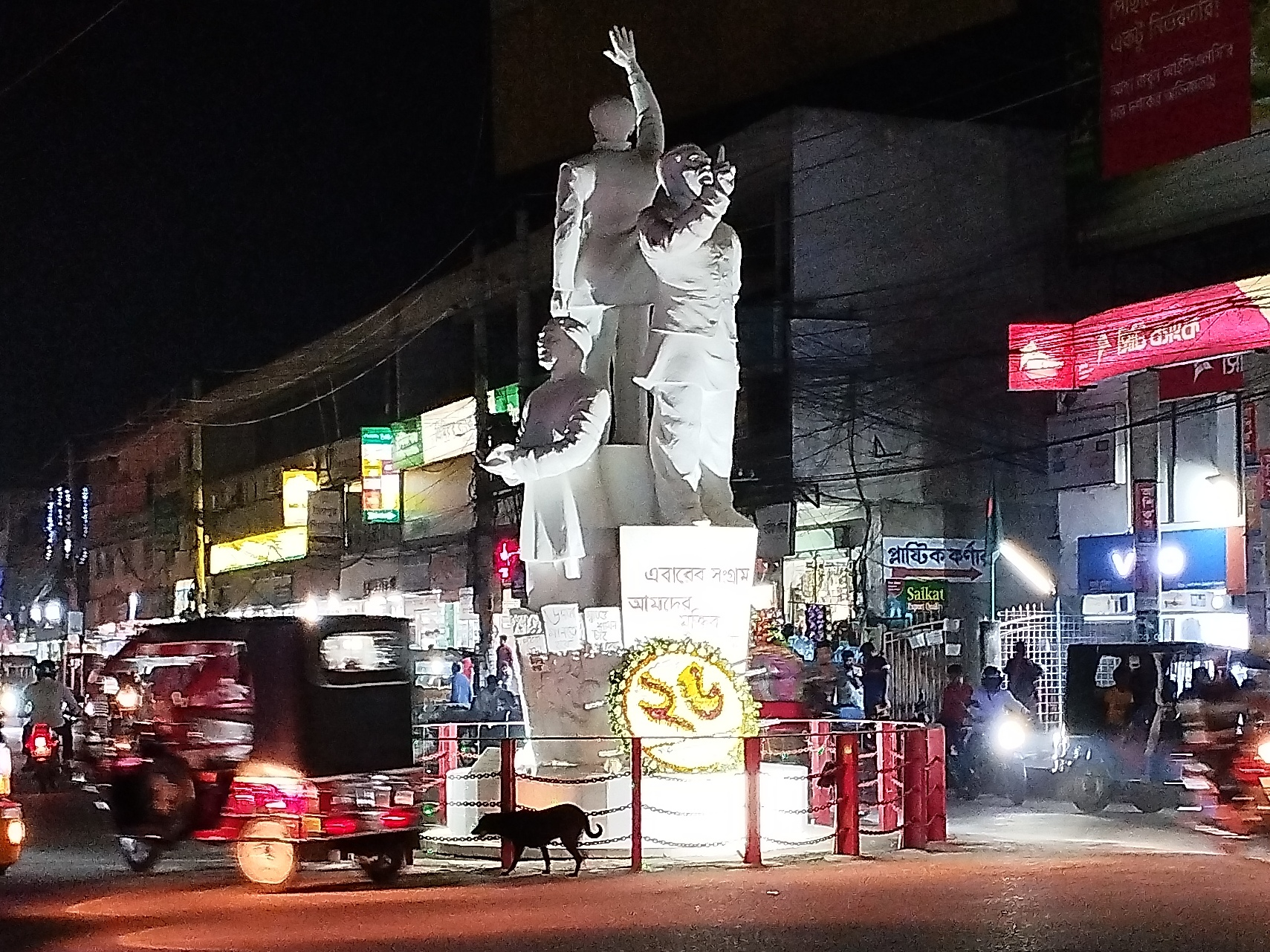
- The Mujib sculpture, which was demolished on 5 August 2024
- Interactive map of Panch Rastar Mor; Shapla Square
- 23°54′35″N 89°7′27″E
- Location: Kushtia

History
- Built: Shapla sculpture (2003); Mujib sculpture (2020)
- Built for: Shapla sculpture constructed to beautify the city; Mujib sculpture constructed in observance of Mujib Year
- Demolished: 2024

Panch Rastar Mor or Shapla Square is a major junction and one of the busiest locations in Kushtia. In 2003 the Kushtia Municipality constructed a sculpture of the national flower the Shapla (water lily) at the center of the intersection. Since then the junction became popularly known as Shapla Square. In 2020 on the occasion of Mujib Year the Shapla sculpture was replaced with a sculpture of Sheikh Mujibur Rahman.

== History ==
In 2003 the Kushtia Municipality constructed a sculpture of the national flower the Shapla (water lily), at Panch Rastar Mor with the aim of beautifying the city. Since then, the intersection became known as Shapla Square.

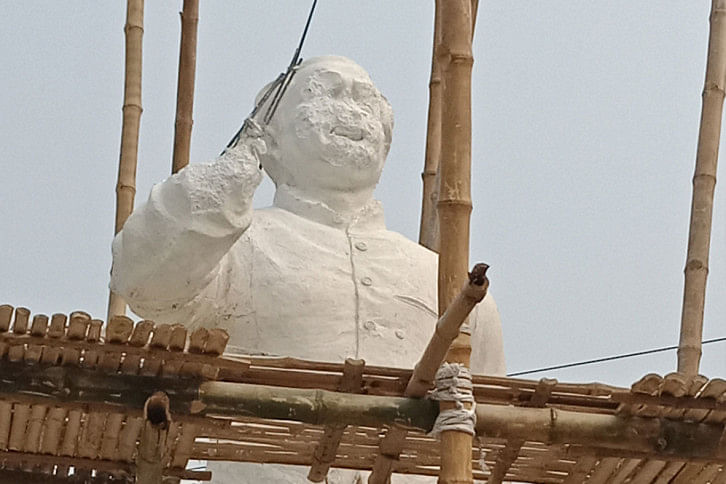
The damaged Mujib sculpture in 2020

On the occasion of Mujib Year, the Shapla sculpture was replaced in 2020 with a sculpture of Sheikh Mujibur Rahman named 'Mujib Sculpture'. It was scheduled to be inaugurated on 16 December 2020. However, on the night of 4 December vandals damaged the sculpture by breaking its hands, head, and face.

Following the vandalism, two teachers and two students of the Ibni Masud (R.) Madrasa in the Jagati Westpara neighborhood of Kushtia were arrested. On 19 January 2023 a court acquitted the two teachers Yusuf Ali and Al Amin. Later, on 7 October 2024 the Women and Children Court of Kushtia acquitted the two students Mithun and Nahid.

After the destruction of the original Mujib sculpture, three new sculptures of Sheikh Mujibur Rahman were erected at the site. The sculptures were created by artist Jamal Mahbub Shamim. Murals of the four national leaders of Bangladesh were also placed on the base of the sculpture.

The construction cost of the sculpture was between 3.4 and 3.5 million Bangladeshi taka. For its security a police team was permanently stationed at Panch Rastar Mor which cost the government treasury approximately 13.2 million Bangladeshi taka. On 5 February 2022 a mentally unstable person climbed onto the sculpture and made obscene gestures. A video of the incident went viral on social media leading to the temporary suspension of three police constables for negligence.

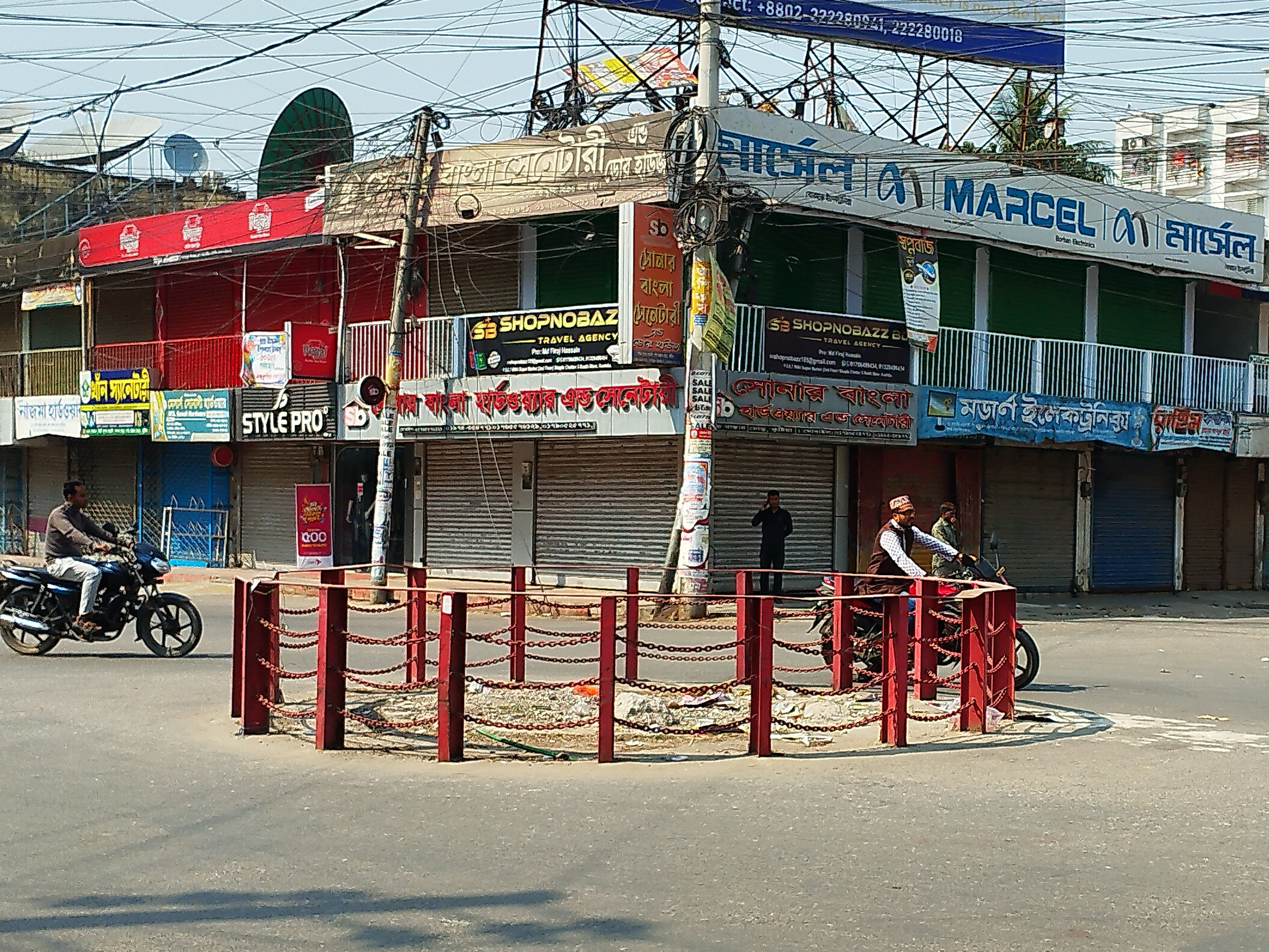
Current state

On 4 August 2024 during a student-public protest rally the first attack on the sculpture occurred. That day protesters damaged parts of the sculpture with hammers. On the next day 5 August they further vandalized it and set it on fire. On 6 August using a crane the protesting students and public completely demolished the sculpture. A few days later the Kushtia Municipality removed the debris to facilitate public movement.

== External ==
- Media related to Shapla Square, Kushtia at Wikimedia Commons
