= Map wiki =

Map wiki or wiki map may refer to any number of social media entities associated with mapping:

- Wikimapia
- OpenStreetMap
- Google Map Maker

== See also ==
- Map
- Portal:Maps
- Category:Web mapping
- Wikipedia:WikiProject Maps
