= Mapping Bangladesh =

- Founded: 18 January 2012
- Type: Online Community
- Purpose: Digital mapping
- Location: Bangladesh
- Members: 3000+
- Website: Official website

Mapping Bangladesh (Bengali: ম্যাপিং বাংলাদেশ) is an online-based community in Bangladesh constituted of mappers working to develop a digital mapping system through contributions of citizen cartographers on Google Map Maker.

== History ==
Google opened up Google Map Maker, a public cartography project, to a collaborative community effort in certain territories in June 2008. Bangladesh was open for editing on 28 September 2008. The Mapping Bangladesh community was co-founded by Google and Altaf-Uz-Zaman on 17 January 2012. Afterwards, it started working with a view to uniting all mappers (citizen cartographers) across the country under one community. The community aimed at teaching citizen cartographers how to map features on Map Maker, provided a ground for discussion about local conventions, and engaged in discussions about how to best represent the country digitally to the world by means of Google Maps.

Many of the Internet users in Bangladesh do not have mastery of English; as such, many of the local mappers could not follow the Map Maker Help section in English given by Map Maker. Being the first ever Map Maker-based community in Bangladesh, Mapping Bangladesh created a site composed fully in the local language (Bengali) with illustrated tutorials, pictorials, and videos for mappers to understand better how Map Maker works and how to use this online tool. Creation of the local Map Maker-based tutorial site led to some serious mapping activity across the country, increasing the number of members of the community from just a few to several hundred as of 2013. Mapping Bangladesh community is praised and claimed to be one of the most organized mapping communities across Map Maker by other country-based Google Map Maker communities.

== Type of activity ==
Mapping Bangladesh focuses on digital mapping using the online-based mapping tool by Google Inc. called Google Map Maker (GMM). Users require a computer, broadband internet, spare time, and knowledge of their respective neighborhood to be able to contribute to Google Maps of Bangladesh. They can add or edit features on Map Maker as well as review features edited by others using only their local knowledge.

== Regional expert reviewers (RERs) ==
Regional Expert Reviewers (RERs) earn their appointed positions by making an impressive number of high-quality contributions to Google's base map, and by actively participating with Google and other mappers on Google's Map Your World discussion forums. They hold reviewing/moderation power on Google Map Maker within their respective assigned territories, which means they can approve or deny an entry on Map Maker, which would be reflected directly on Google Maps. Each regional expert reviewer is hand-picked by the Google team and/or sometimes nominated by existing RERs and Map Maker Country Advocates. Bangladesh had the last RER promotion on 1 October 2012, and the RER Program of the Google Map Maker Team was declared closed soon after, meaning there would be no more additions to the RER pool. Existing RERs, however, still retain their elevated trust levels in their trust regions, their badges, and close engagement with the Google Map Maker team. Bangladesh has 13 regional expert reviewers, everyone being a member of Mapping Bangladesh.

== Improving Bangladesh maps ==
Mapping Bangladesh, by a collaborative effort, added all government healthcare facilities in all 485 upazilas (sub-districts) across the country. They also demarcated all 64 districts and 485 sub-districts, hence completing the entire district and sub-district layer of Google Maps on Map Maker with the help of LGED (Local Government Engineering Department) maps. During the Map Maker APAC Regional Conference 2012 at Hyderabad, India, in 2012, which the Mapping Bangladesh community attended, the Google Map Maker Team expressed their surprise and gratitude for being able to stay organized and able to complete the project. The community has also marked all railway stations across the country. Having these major projects succeed and be praised by Google Map Maker communities, the community is now working at a local level on other projects, adding business listings, neighborhoods, ferry terminals and routes, roads, ports, rivers, and everything that the Map Maker interface and policies (see Terms of Service) allow them to add to Google Maps.

=== Activities in 2012 ===
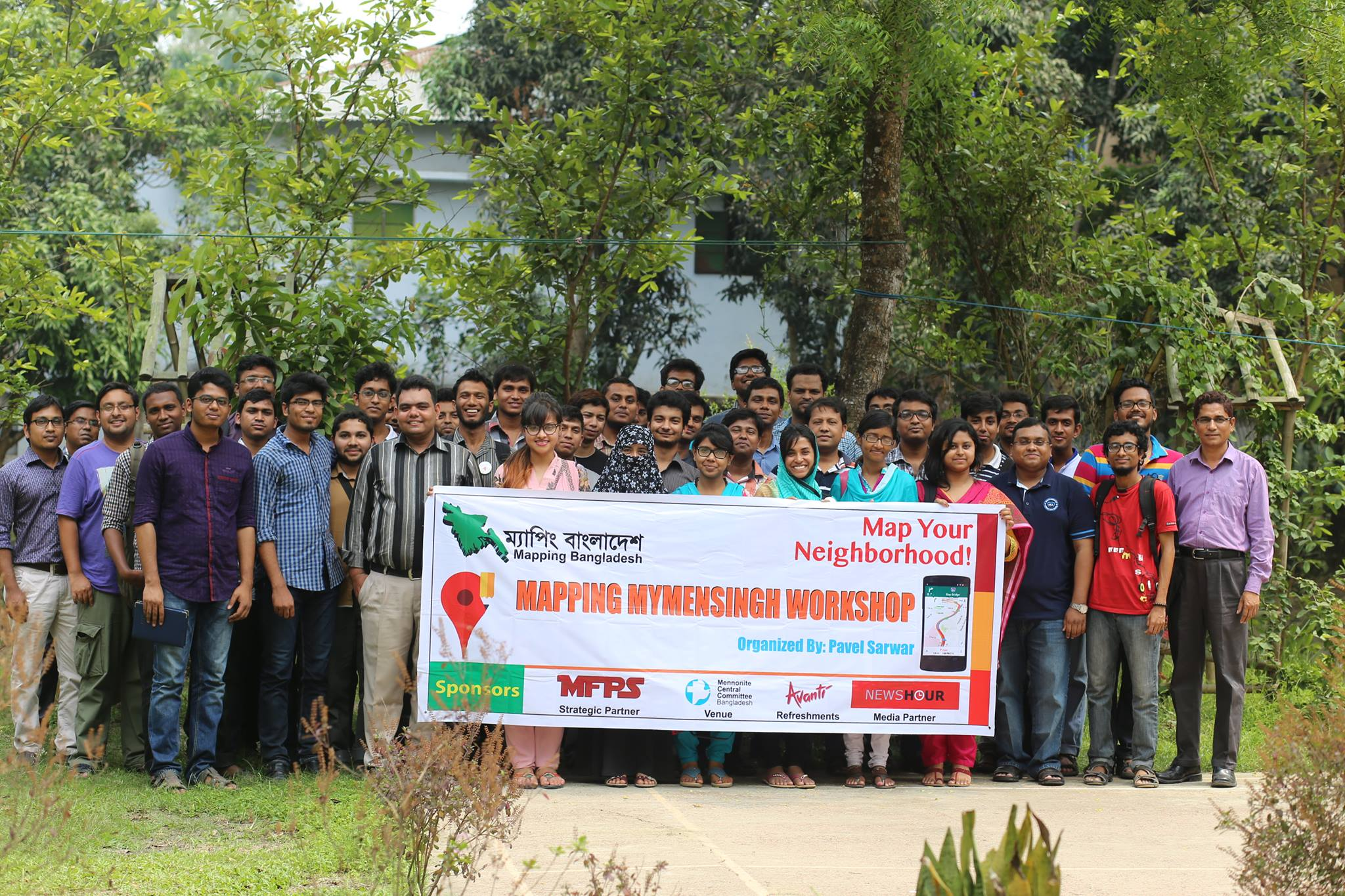
An event of Mapping Bangladesh in Mymensingh

Mapping Bangladesh initiated their forum and site in January 2012. The same year in March, Google transferred ownership of Bangladesh mapping to local RERs (Regional Expert Reviewers). The community joined the Google Map Your World community in April and, in July, opened their own chapter on Map Makerpedia, the crowd-sourced guide for Map Maker users. In August, the Map Maker team created new default road speeds specifically for Bangladesh, a privilege only a few Map Maker-enabled countries are claimed to have till today. The community published their first forum newsletter in September, which was claimed to be the first-ever endeavor to publish a community-based newsletter by any community across Google Map Maker. They also completed the entire sub-district layer of Bangladesh on Google Maps in November of the same year. The first-ever Google MapUp event in Bangladesh, called MapUp Rangpur, was hosted by the community in Rangpur on 23 November 2012. Different media of the country have seen the event to be a milestone for Bangladesh and bringing the country another step closer to reaching the Vision 2021 envisioned by the government. In honor of Map Maker contributors in Bangladesh, the Google Map Maker team has published 4 time-lapse videos till date featuring Rangpur, Dhaka, Bogra and Chittagong. - cities where the RERs (Power Mappers) are mostly based.

=== Activities in 2013 ===
The community participated in Bangladesh Smartphone Expo 2013. They also hosted the second Google MapUp event in Bangladesh at Dhaka on 9 February 2013. Their main objectives in 2013 are to host Google MapUp events across the country and teach people with internet how to contribute to the first digital map of the country on Google Maps with their local knowledge. Following the vision, they have organized 17 more MapUps across the country in Chittagong, Rangpur, Comilla, Kushtia, Khulna, and in different public and private universities in Dhaka.
