= Independence Day (Bangladesh) =

National holiday in Bangladesh

Independence Day স্বাধীনতা দিবস
- The first flag of the independent Bangladesh, which was subsequently replaced by the current flag.
- Official name: Independence and National Day
- Observed by: Bangladesh
- Type: National holiday
- Celebrations: Flag hoisting, honouring the Liberation War, parades, award ceremonies, speeches by the President and Prime Minister, political rallies, religious prayers, singing patriotic songs and cultural programmes, grand military parade.
- Date: 26 March
- Next time: 26 March 2027
- Frequency: Annual
- First time: 26 March 1972 (54 years ago)

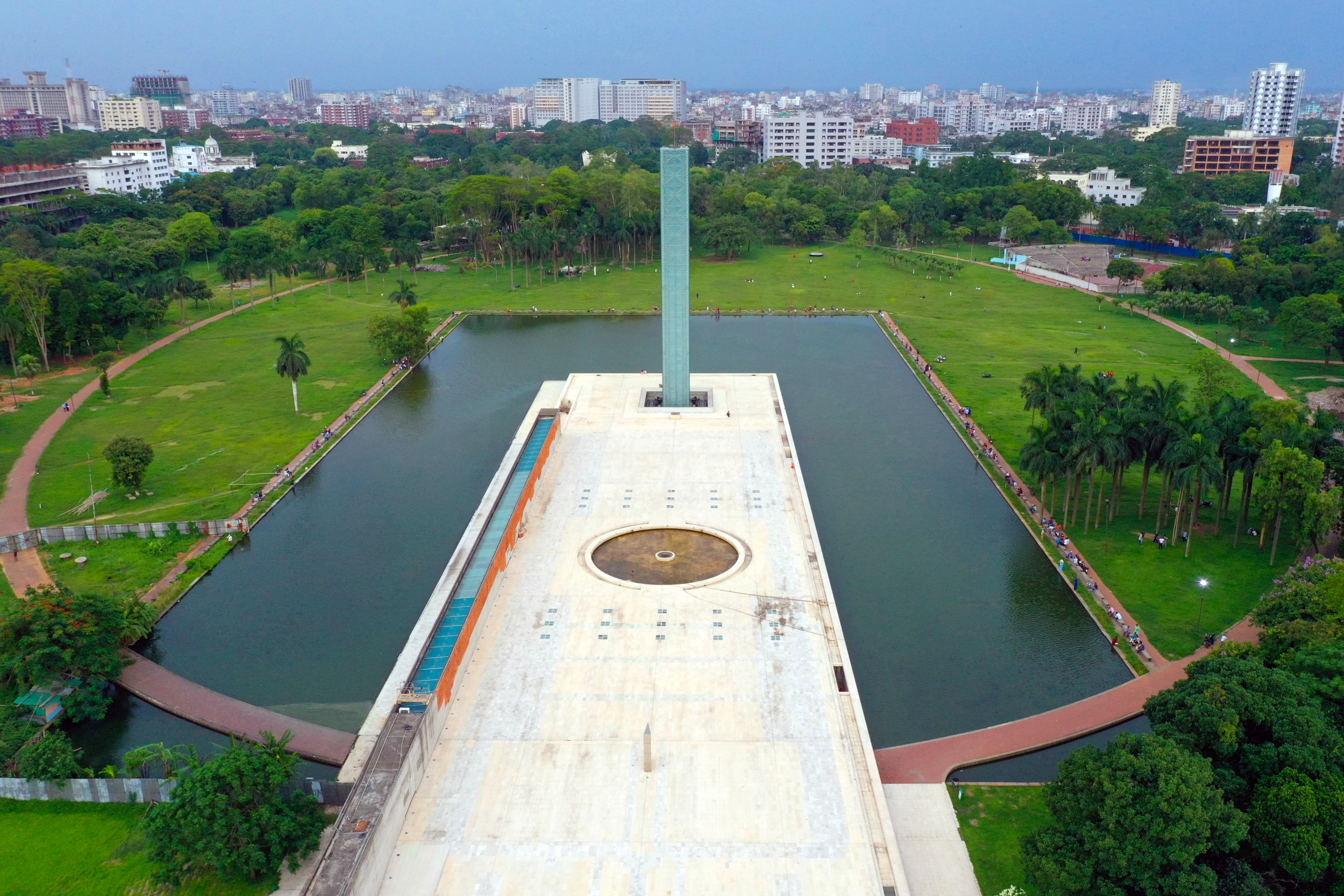
Independence Monument at Ramna, Dhaka

Independence Day, officially Independence and National Day, (Note: Bengali: স্বাধীনতা ও জাতীয় দিবস, romanized: Sbadhinôta o Jatiẏô Dibôs, pronounced [ˈʃadʱiˌnɔtaˑ o ˈdʒati̯oˑ ˈdibɔʃ]) is celebrated on 26 March as a national holiday in Bangladesh. It commemorates the country's declaration of independence from Pakistan in the early hours of 26 March 1971 following Yahya Khan's Operation Searchlight, eventual defeat and the Surrender of Pakistan.

== Background ==
In the 1970 Pakistani general election, held under the military government of President Yahya Khan, the Awami League—led by Sheikh Mujibur Rahman—won a clear majority in both the national and provincial assemblies of East Pakistan. Zulfikar Ali Bhutto conspired with Yahya Khan and changed their position, refusing to hand over power to Sheikh Mujib. After the Pakistan Government's poor response to the 1970 Bhola cyclone which left over 500,000 people dead, Abdul Hamid Khan Bhashani a prominent political figure who had previously led multiple rebellion against the British Raj was the first ever Bengali to declare independence of East Pakistan in a massive public rally on 23 November 1970 but it was not officially recognized. Negotiations began between the two sides, however the ruling West Pakistani leadership did not trust Sheikh Mujib, due to instances such as the Agartala conspiracy case. When it became evident that the promises made by the West Pakistan government were not going to be kept, many East Pakistani Bangla-speaking Muslims and Hindus began a spirited struggle for independence. On 7 March 1971, Sheikh Mujibur Rahman gave his famous speech at the Ramna Racecourse, in which he called for a non-cooperation movement.

Authorities, mostly West Pakistani personnel, rounded up Bengali armed forces officers, NCOs, and enlisted personnel. Forced disappearances were rampant. On the night of 25 March, the Pakistan Army began Operation Searchlight, conclusively signalling West Pakistan was not ready for a transfer of political power to the Awami League led by Sheikh Mujibur Rahman.

The then major Ziaur Rahman declared the independence of Bangladesh on behalf of Sheikh Mujibur Rahman at Kalur Ghat Radio Station on 27 March 1971. Major Zia (who was also a BDF Sector Commander of Sector 1 and later of Sector 11) raised an independent Z Force brigade, Chittagong and the guerrilla struggle officially began. The people of Bangladesh then took part in a nine-month guerrilla war against the Pakistan Army and their collaborators, including the paramilitary Razakars. This resulted in the death of about 3 million Bangladeshi, as per Awami league and Indian sources, in the Bangladesh Liberation War and Bangladesh genocide. The Mukti Bahini, later with military support from India, defeated the Pakistan Army on 16 December 1971, leading to the end of the war and the Surrender of Pakistan.

== Celebrations ==
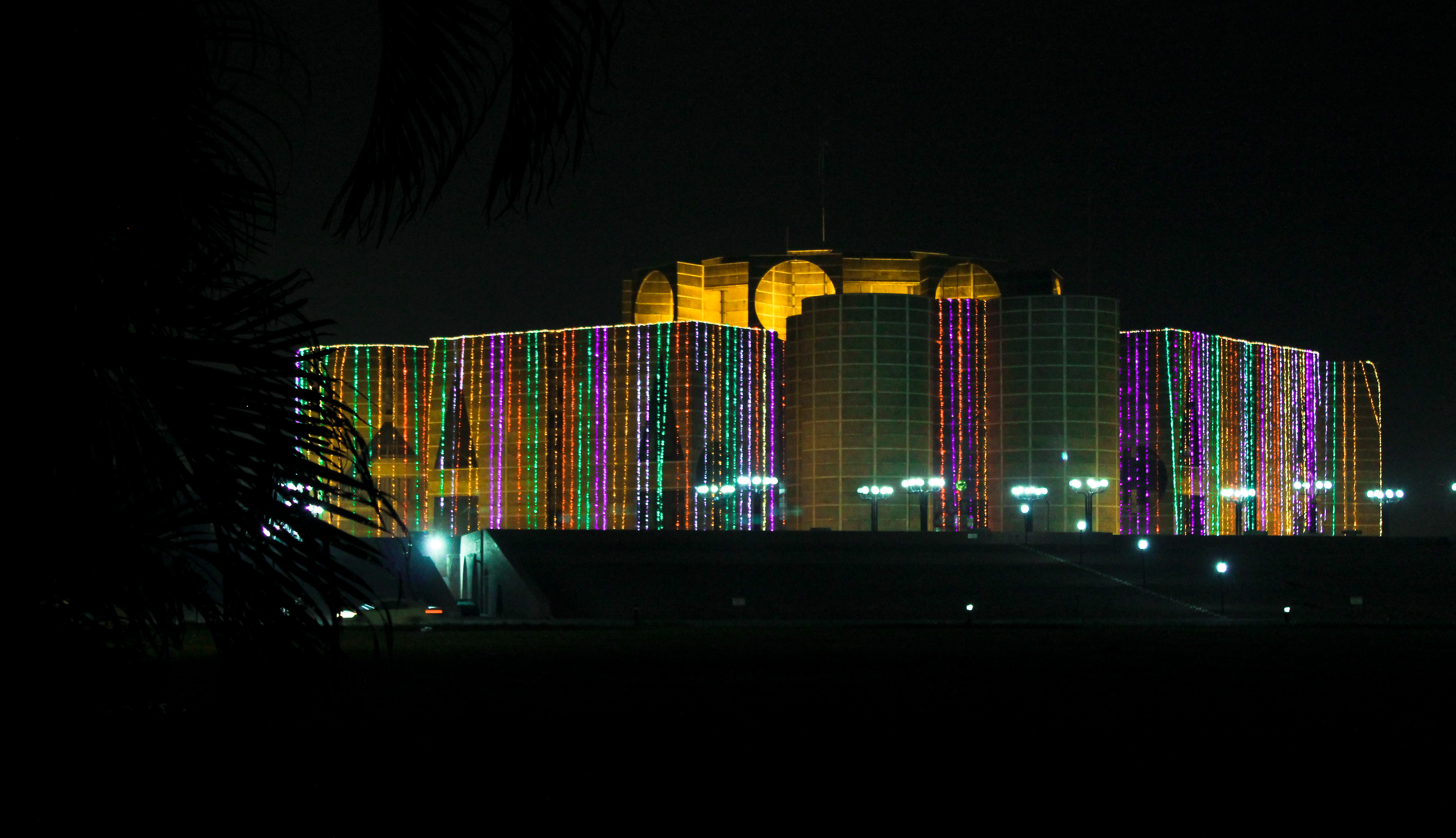
National parliament building in Dhaka illuminated during celebration

Independence Day is commonly associated with parades, political speeches, fairs, concerts, ceremonies, and various other public and private events celebrating the history and traditions of Bangladesh. TV and radio stations broadcast special programs and patriotic songs in honor of Independence Day. A thirty-one gun salute may be conducted in the morning. The main streets are decorated with national flags. Different political parties and socioeconomic organizations undertake programs to mark the day in a befitting manner, including paying respects at National Martyrs' Memorial at Savar near Dhaka. Since 2026, Independence Day military parade at National Parade Square resumed after 2008. 2021 marked the Golden Jubilee of the Independence of Bangladesh.

== Independence Award ==
The Independence Award, which is bestowed upon Bangladeshi citizens or organizations on the eve of the Independence Day, is awarded by the government of Bangladesh. This annual award, instituted in 1977, is given for substantial contribution in the Independence War, the Language Movement, education, literature, journalism, public service, science-technology, medical science, social science, music, games and sports, fine arts, rural development, and other fields.

== See also ==
- The Blood telegram
- Bangladesh Genocide Remembrance Day
- History of Bangladesh (1947–1971)
- Timeline of Bangladesh Liberation War
- Victory Day
