= Victory Day (Bangladesh) =

National holiday in Bangladesh

Victory Day বিজয় দিবস
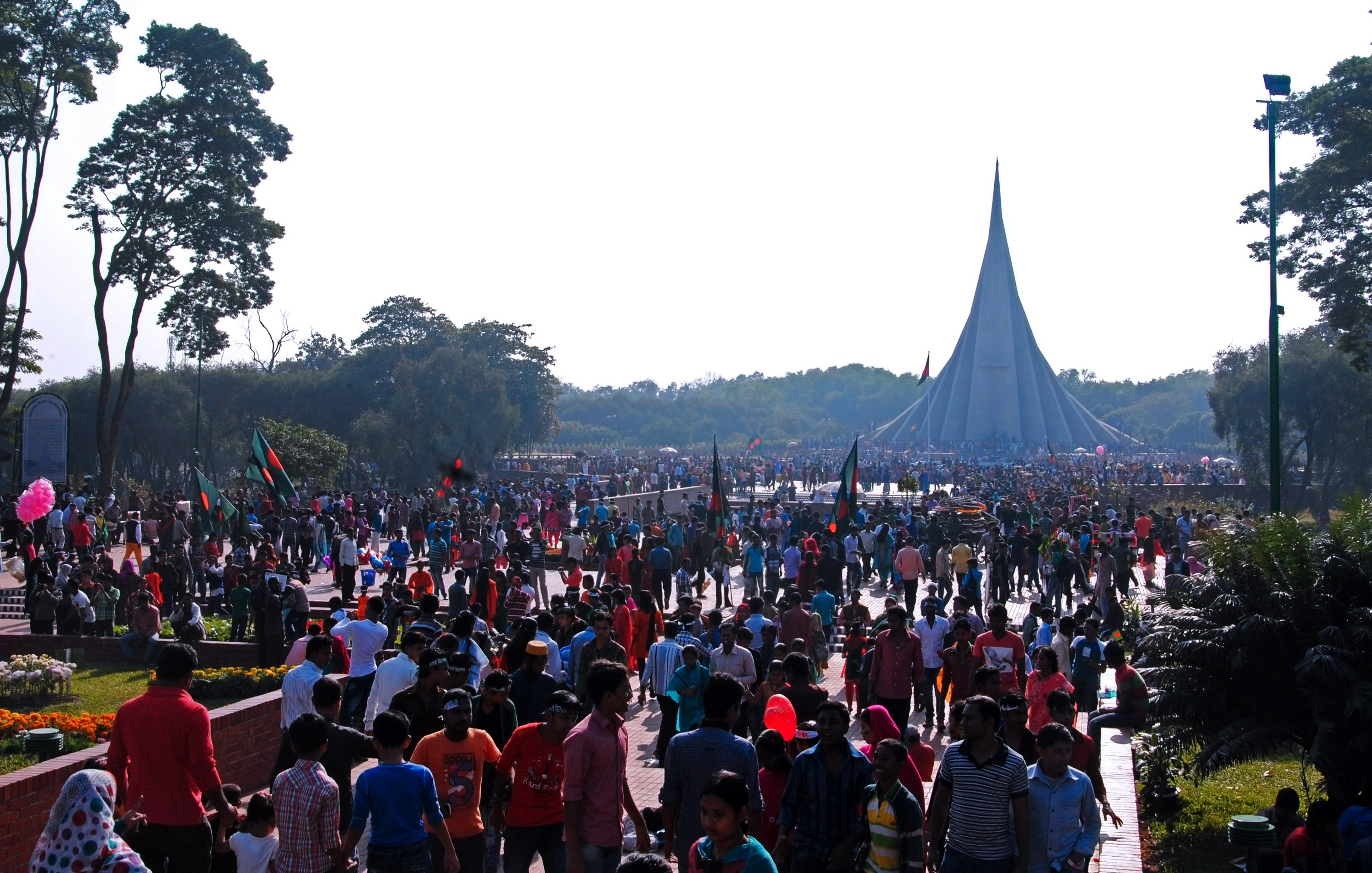
- Victory Day celebration at National Martyrs' Memorial
- Observed by: Bangladesh
- Type: National
- Celebrations: Flag hoisting, honouring the Liberation War, parades, speeches by the President and Prime Minister, political rallies, religious prayers, singing patriotic songs and cultural programmes.
- Date: 16 December
- Next time: 16 December 2026
- Frequency: Annual
- First time: 16 December 1971 (54 years ago)
- Related to: Independence Day of Bangladesh

Victory Day (Bengali: বিজয় দিবস, romanised: Bijôẏ Dibôś) is a national holiday in Bangladesh celebrated on 16 December to commemorate the defeat of the Pakistan Armed Forces in the Bangladesh Liberation War in 1971 and the Independence of Bangladesh. It commemorates the Pakistani Instrument of Surrender, wherein the commander of the Pakistani Forces, General A. A. K. Niazi, surrendered to Lieutenant General Jagjit Singh Aurora, joint commander of Indian and Bangladesh Forces, ending the nine-month Bangladesh Liberation War and 1971 Bangladesh genocide and marking the official secession of East Pakistan to become the new state of Bangladesh.

This day and event is also commemorated across India as the Vijay Diwas for the victory in Indo-Pakistani war of 1971 aftermath of Bangladesh liberation.

== History ==
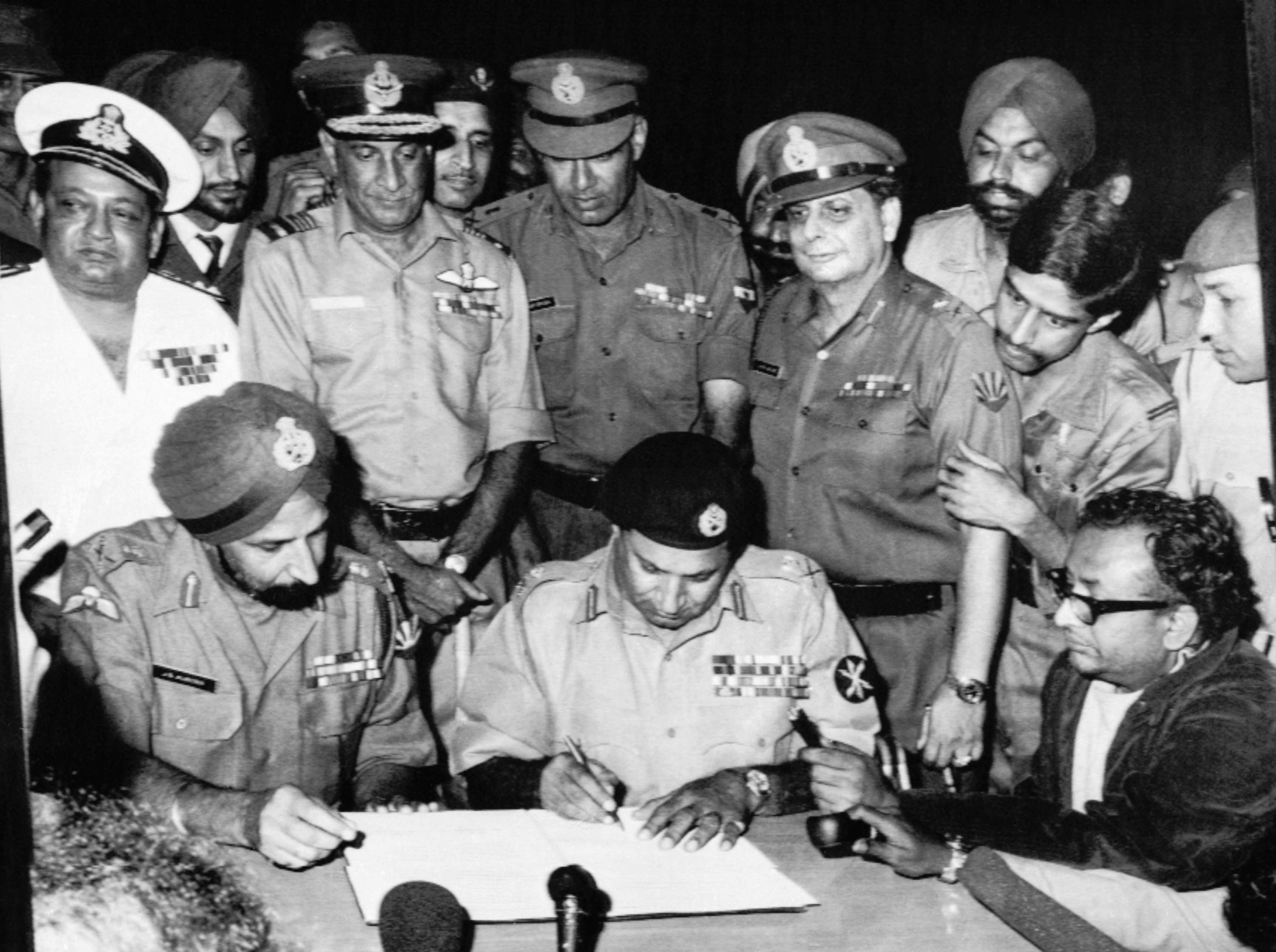
Signing of Pakistani Instrument of Surrender by Pakistan's Lt.Gen. A. A. K. Niazi to the joint commander of the Liberation Force Lt. Gen. Jagjit Singh Aurora in Dhaka on 16 December 1971.

In 1971, Bangladesh fought the Bangladesh Liberation War against Pakistan to become an Independent country, which resulted in the secession of East Pakistan from the Islamic Republic of Pakistan and established the sovereign nation called Bangladesh. The war pitted East Pakistan and India against West Pakistan, and lasted for a duration of nine months. One of the most violent wars of the 20th century, it witnessed large-scale atrocities, the exodus of 10 million refugees and the killing of 3 million people by the Pakistani armed forces.

On 16 December 1971, Lieutenant General Amir Abdullah Khan Niazi, CO of Pakistan Armed Forces located in East Pakistan signed the Instrument of Surrender. The Instrument of Surrender was a written agreement that enabled the surrender of the Pakistan Eastern Command in the Bangladesh Liberation War, and marked the end of the Indo-Pakistani War of 1971 in the Eastern Theater.

The surrender took place at the Ramna Race Course in Dhaka on 16 December 1971. Lieutenant General Amir Abdullah Khan Niazi and Lieutenant General Jagjit Singh Aurora, joint commander of Indian and Bangladesh Forces, signed the instrument amid thousands of cheering crowds at the racecourse. Air Commodore A. K. Khandker, deputy commander-in-chief of the Bangladesh Armed Forces, and Lieutenant General J F R Jacob of the Indian Eastern Command, acted as witnesses to the surrender. Also present were Vice-admiral Mohammad Shariff, commander of the Pakistani Naval Eastern Command and Air Vice-Marshal Patrick D. Callaghan of the Pakistan Air Force's Eastern Air Force Command, who signed the agreement. On behalf of Bangladesh, Air Commodore A. K. Khandker acted as witness to the surrender. Lieutenant J F R Jacob, Chief of Staff of the Indian Eastern Command, along with the other commanders of Indian naval and air forces, acted as witnesses on behalf of India. Aurora accepted the surrender without a word, while the crowd on the race course started shouting anti-Niazi and anti-Pakistan slogans. The Surrender of Pakistan Armed Forces marked the end of the Bangladesh Liberation War and the creation of Bangla Desh (later reduced to a single word). Most United Nations member nations were quick to recognise Bangladesh within months of its independence.

In 1996, the Bangladesh Bank issued a 10 Taka note with an overprint commemorating Victory Day's Silver Jubilee (the 25th anniversary).

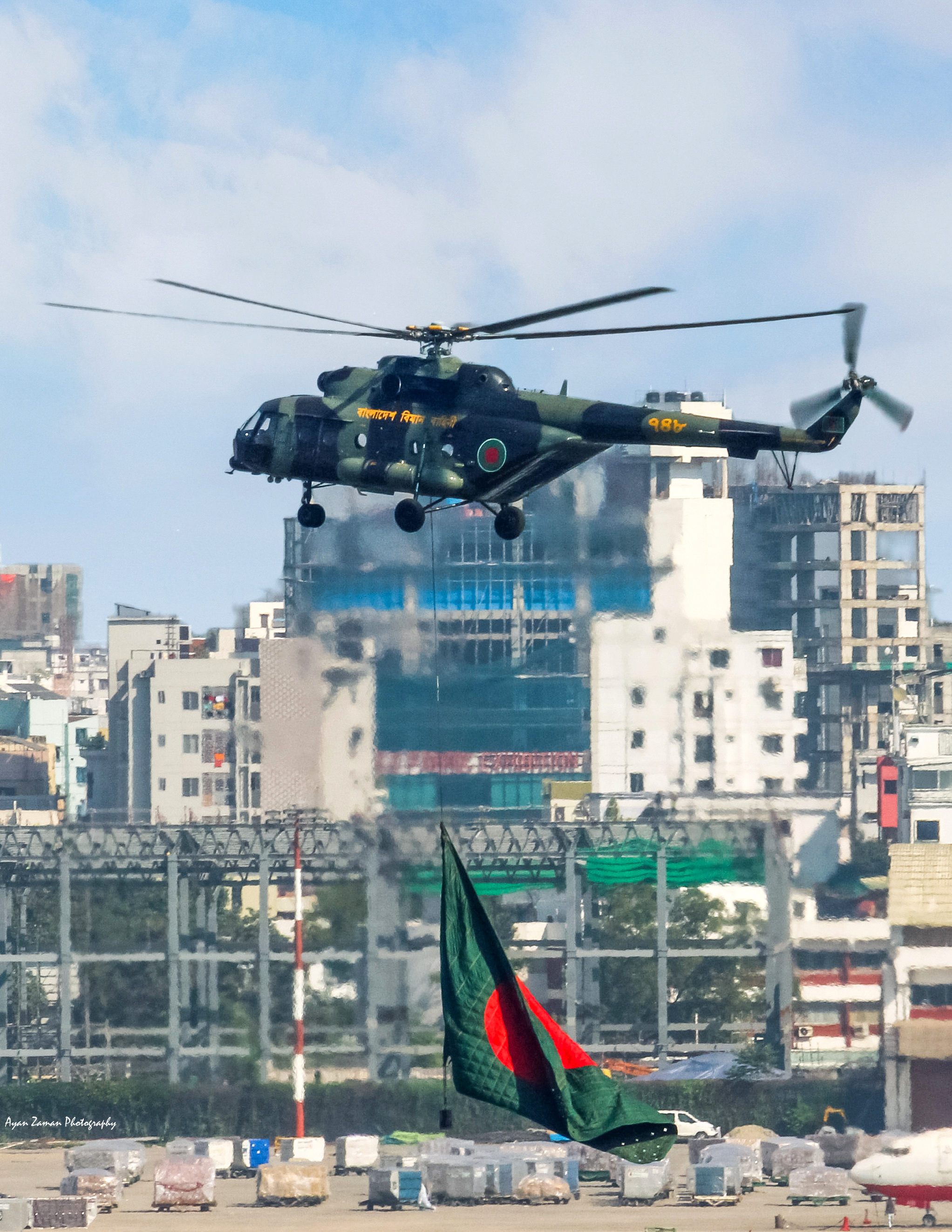
Bangladesh Air Force show in the Golden Jubilee of the Independence of Bangladesh, December 2021

== Celebrations ==
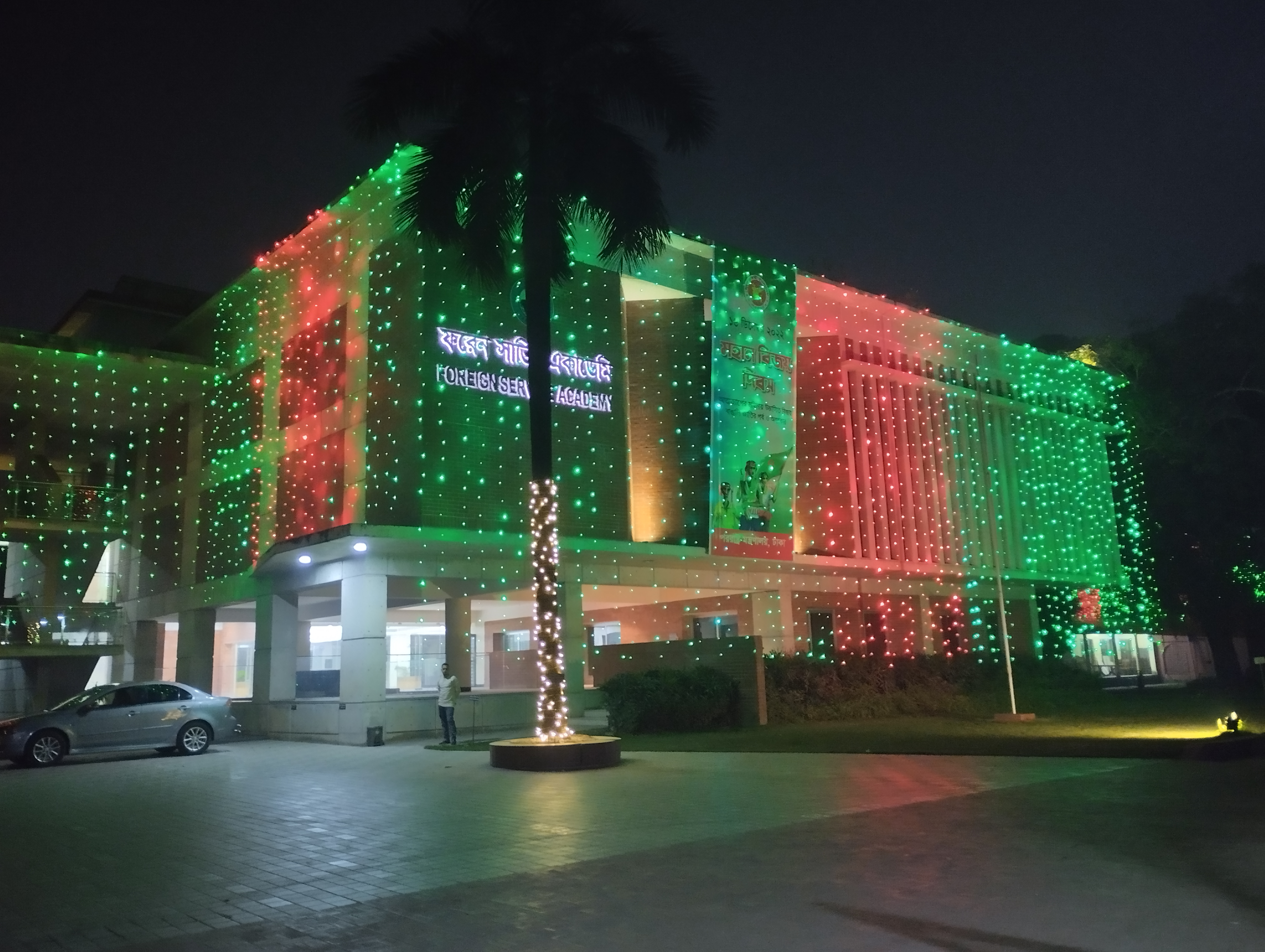
Building illuminated with red and green coloured-lights (colours of the national flag of Bangladesh) in the Victory Day

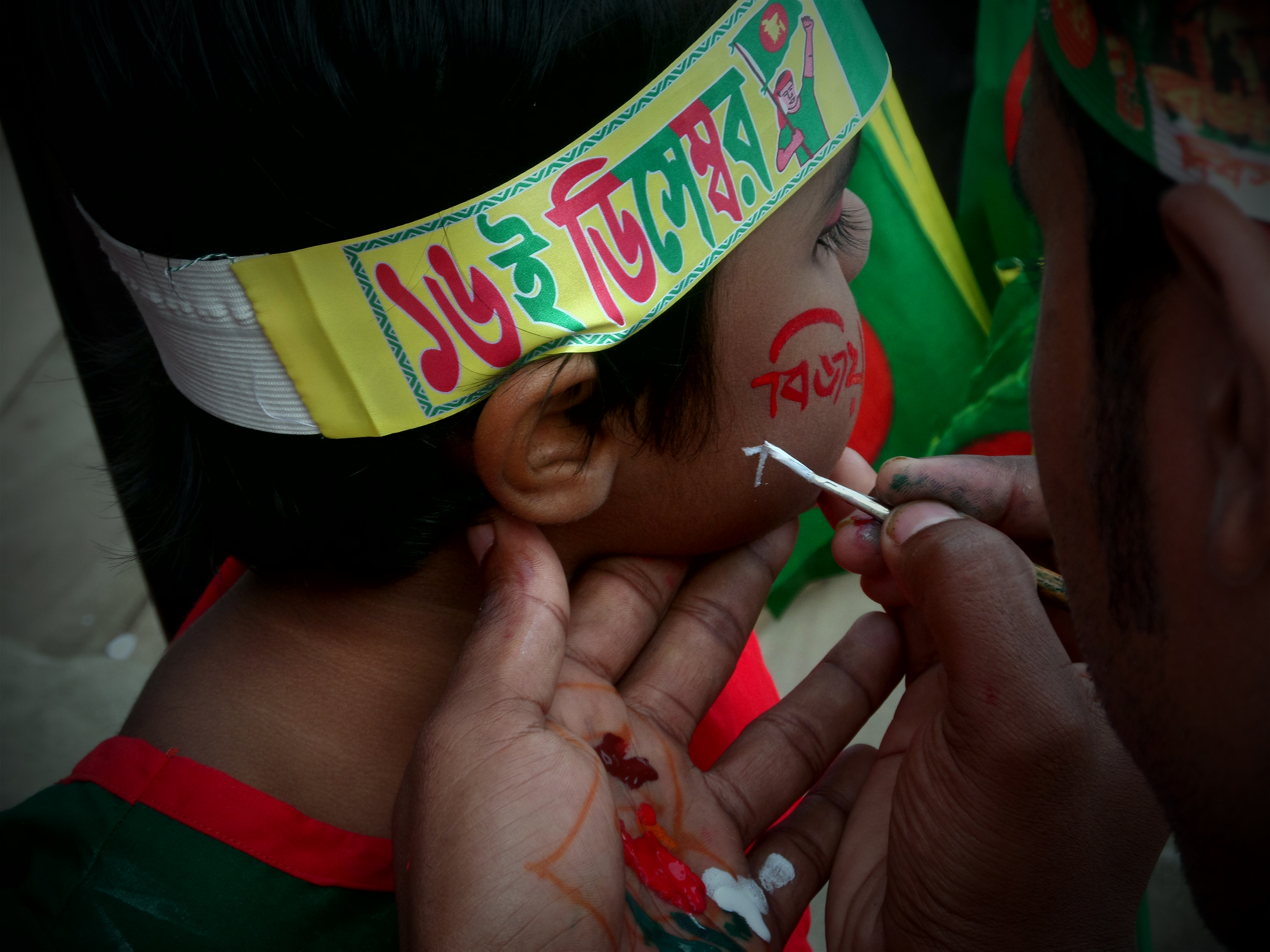
It's common to wear headbands and to paint victory related themes on the face in the Victory Day

The celebration of Victory Day has been taking place since 1972. The ritual of the celebration gradually obtained a distinctive character with a number of similar elements: Military Parade by the Bangladesh Armed Forces at the National Parade Ground, ceremonial meetings, speeches, lectures, receptions and fireworks displays. TV and radio stations broadcast special programmes and patriotic songs.

The streets and buildings are decorated with the national flag and the national colours. Different political parties and socioeconomic organisations undertake programmes to mark the day in a befitting manner, including the paying of respects at Jatiyo Smriti Soudho, the national memorial at Savar in Dhaka District. Dua mahfils (religious prayers) also held in various institutions and gatherings praying peace for the decreased souls of the martyrs of the 1971 genocide and well-being of the nation.

=== Victory Day Fairs ===
In 2024, Bangladesh announced that nationwide fairs would replace the traditional Victory Day Military parade. The fairs were planned to spread across districts and subdistricts, consisting of local crafts and performances. The goal of this idea is was to encourage community participation and celebrate Bangladesh's independence through local cultural activities.

=== Military parade ===
The day's highlight is the national holiday parade on Dhaka's National Parade Ground, hosted by the Bangladesh Armed Forces and involves personnel from the Bangladesh Police, Border Guard Bangladesh, Bangladesh Jail and Bangladesh Ansar. Presided by the president of Bangladesh in his capacity as commander in chief through the Armed Forces Division, it has been held since the 1970s as the principal national celebrations of the victory of the Bangladeshi people against the government of Pakistan, assisted by the Indian Armed Forces, and as such it is the principal holiday of the Armed Forces. A televised event with nationwide radio simulcast provided by Bangladesh Television and Radio Bangladesh, it is the country's main military parade event of the year and is one of the biggest annual military parades in South Asia.

==== Expanded summary ====
Before around 10 am, a division-sized formation of around 18,000 personnel of the armed forces and law enforcement organisations, which had already been assembled on the parade ground, alongside a 4,000-strong mobile column amounting to around 400 vehicles, and a massed military bands and pipe bands contingent numbering around 1,200 musicians, awaits the arrival of the president, as the prime minister, who also serves as minister of defence concurrently, and the Principal Staff Officer of the AFD/BAF, usually a lieutenant general, both arrive at the parade grandstand in the centre of the grounds together with the service commanders and commanding officers of the law enforcement services, together with ministers of the state cabinet, including the minister of liberation war affairs, the speaker of the Jatiya Sangsad and MPs, the Chief Justice of the Supreme Court of Bangladesh, the Attorney general, living veterans of the Liberation War of 1971 and family members of those killed in action and deceased veterans, chairmen of state agencies and defence sector firms, the general public, representatives of state and private industries and veterans of the armed forces and law enforcement organisations are stationed in between the major dignitaries who are stationed in the central grandstand. One battalion at the centre of the formations assembled carries the National Standards (the Flag of Bangladesh with the gold fringe and the Bengali title of the unit) which serve as the principal colour of all Armed Forces formations, while each of the other battalions sans the first three, which are massed colour guard battalions, have 15 colour bearers at the front of their units.

At 10 am the massed bands' fanfare trumpeters and trumpeters sound the presidential fanfare, signalling the arrival of the president, escorted by an Army mounted squadron and escort motorcycles of the police. As the president leaves his vehicle, he is greeted by the important dignitaries and upon arriving at the central grandstand the parade commander, usually an Army major general, leads the parade in rendering a full presidential salute as while the national anthem Amar Sonar Bangla is played by the massed bands alongside the firing of a 21-gun salute. As the music ends, the parade executes order arms, following this the PC informs the president of the readiness of the parade for the review. Both, together with aides-de-camp (one each from the armed forces and police) and the PSO, ride an open-top Land Rover to inspect the parade formations. Upon approach of the parade formations the massed bands, under the baton of the senior director of music of the Armed Forces (usually a lieutenant colonel or colonel) play a slow march as the president reviews each of the battalions of the ground column. As the music ends the president and the PSO, together with the PC, leave the inspection vehicle as the former two return to the parade grandstand.

Following the conclusion of the inspection of the line the PC, after having ordered the parade to shoulder arms, then informs the president for the commencement of the march past in the following manner:

Mr. president, may I now ask your permission for the commencement of the parade march past, sir.

The approval having now granted the PC, upon returning to his place in the parade, orders the parade to execute the left turn, after which the colour bearers now turn to take their places in the right flank ranks of the formation together with the leading officer of the battalions. Following this the commander of the National Standards colour guard orders the battalion to turn on the march, taking its place in the formation as the PC rides his vehicle. Following the order to quick march the parade begins with the fly past of aircraft from both the Bangladesh Army Aviation Group and Bangladesh Naval Aviation, both recently founded formations, and the transport planes of the Air Force, as the massed bands play Notuner Gaan. As the parade commander and his second in command approach the grandstand in their vehicles, the two officers, together with their adjutants, salute on the eyes right. They are followed by the infantry battalions, and followed on by a double past of parachute special forces personnel, which had jumped from an Air Force transport plane into the parade ground during the march past, and then by the mobile column and fly past of Air Force fighter and trainer aircraft as well as helicopters.

=== Order of parade march past in quick time ===
- Massed colour guard regiment of formation colours of the armed forces (three battalions)
- Veterans of the Liberation War
- 1st Battalion, President Guard Regiment
- Battalion from the Armoured Corps
- Regiment from the Infantry Corps
  - Battalion from the East Bengal Regiment
  - Battalion from the Bangladesh Infantry Regiment
- Bangladesh Regiment of Artillery
- Bangladesh Corps of Engineers
- Bangladesh Signals Corps
- National Standards colour guard
- Composite battalion of army service support branches
- Para-Commando Brigade Battalion
- Battalion of army servicewomen
- Navy
- Air Force
- Bangladesh National Cadet Corps
- Border Guard Bangladesh
- Bangladesh Police
- Bangladesh Ansar
- Bangladesh Jail
- Battalion of female Police and Ansar servicewomen
- Infantry battalion wearing modern combat equipment and rifles
- Army K-9 company and Army and Police combined mounted squadron
Victory Day celebration
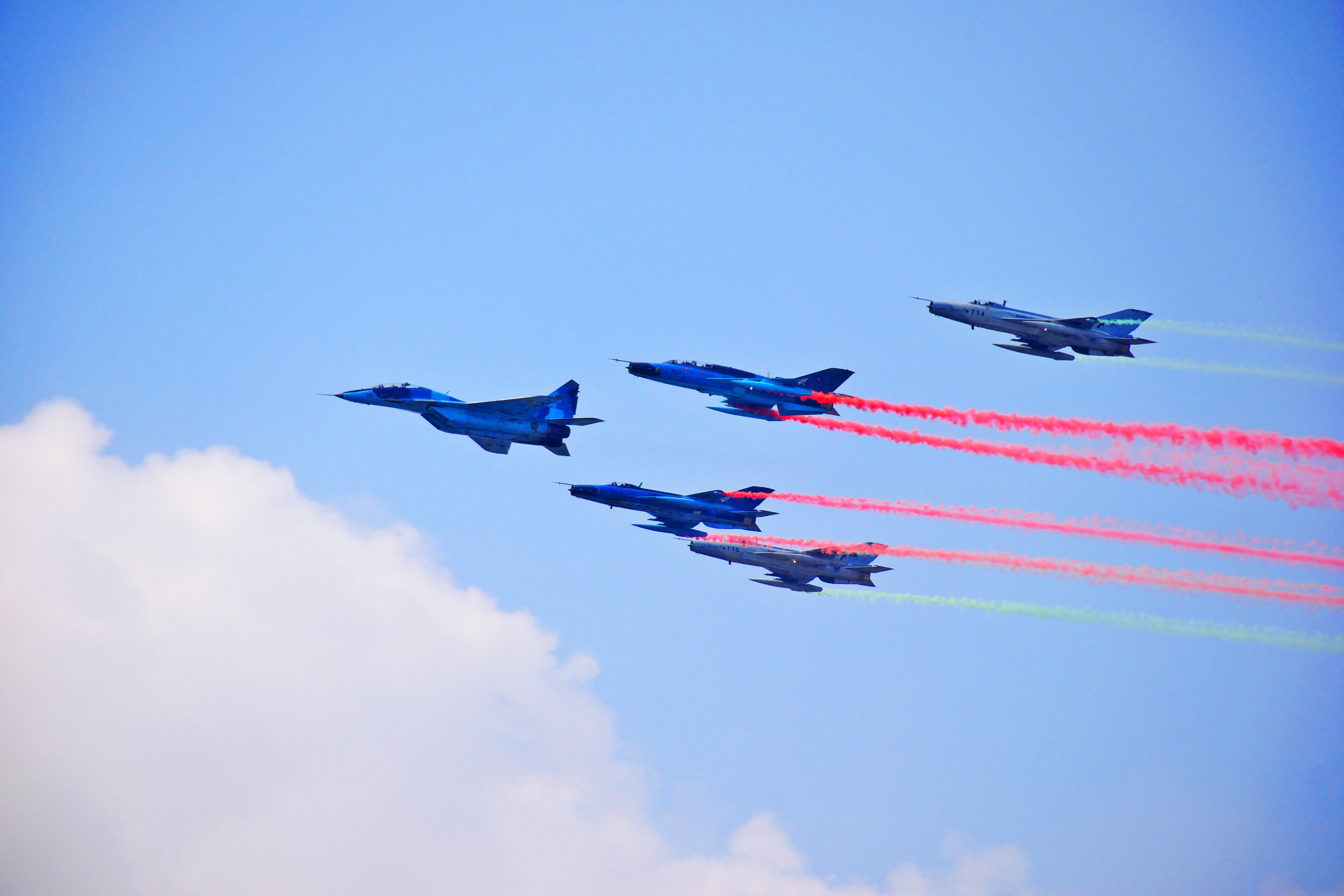
Mikoyan MiG-29 & Chengdu F-7 of Bangladesh Air Force fly over national parade ground

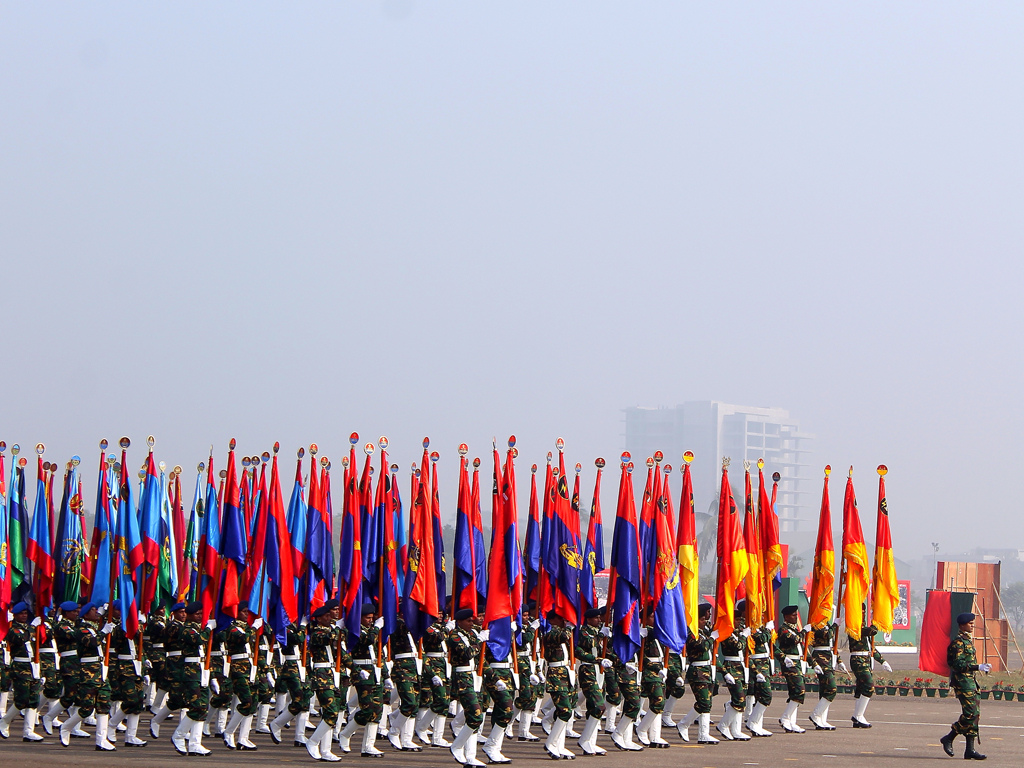
Bangladesh Army marching in Victory Day Parade.

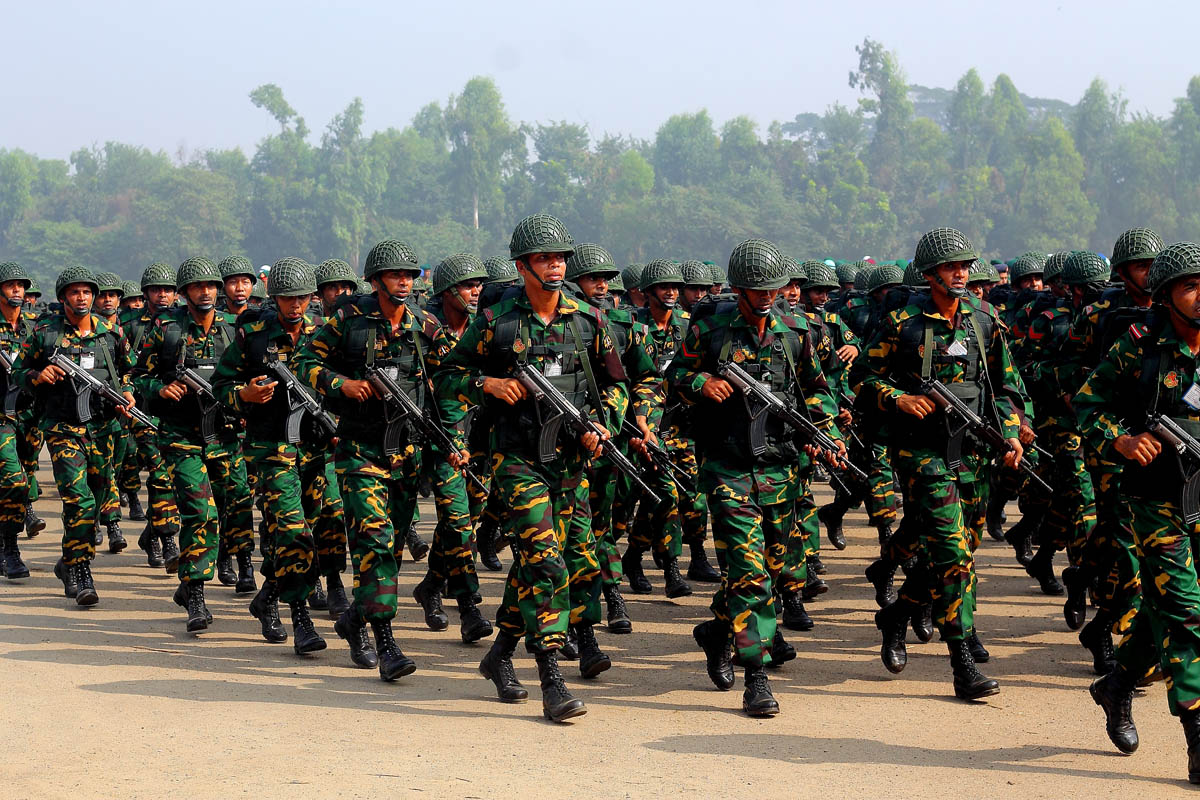
East Bengal Regiment in Victory Day Parade.

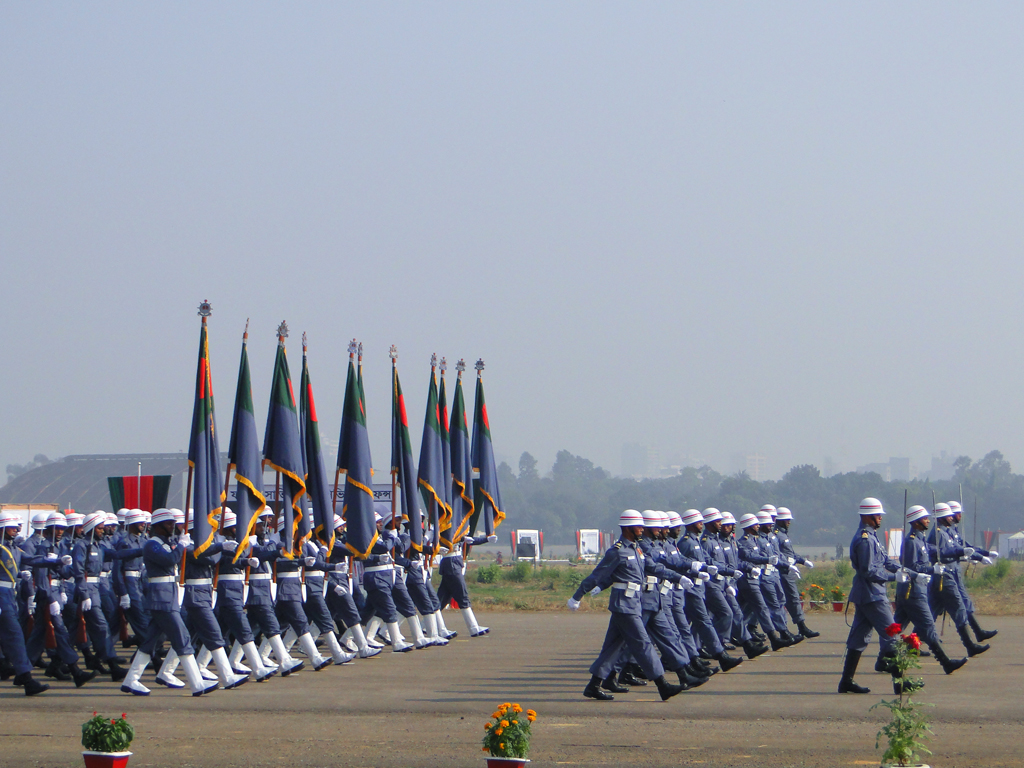
Bangladesh Coast Guard unit marching in Victory Day Parade.

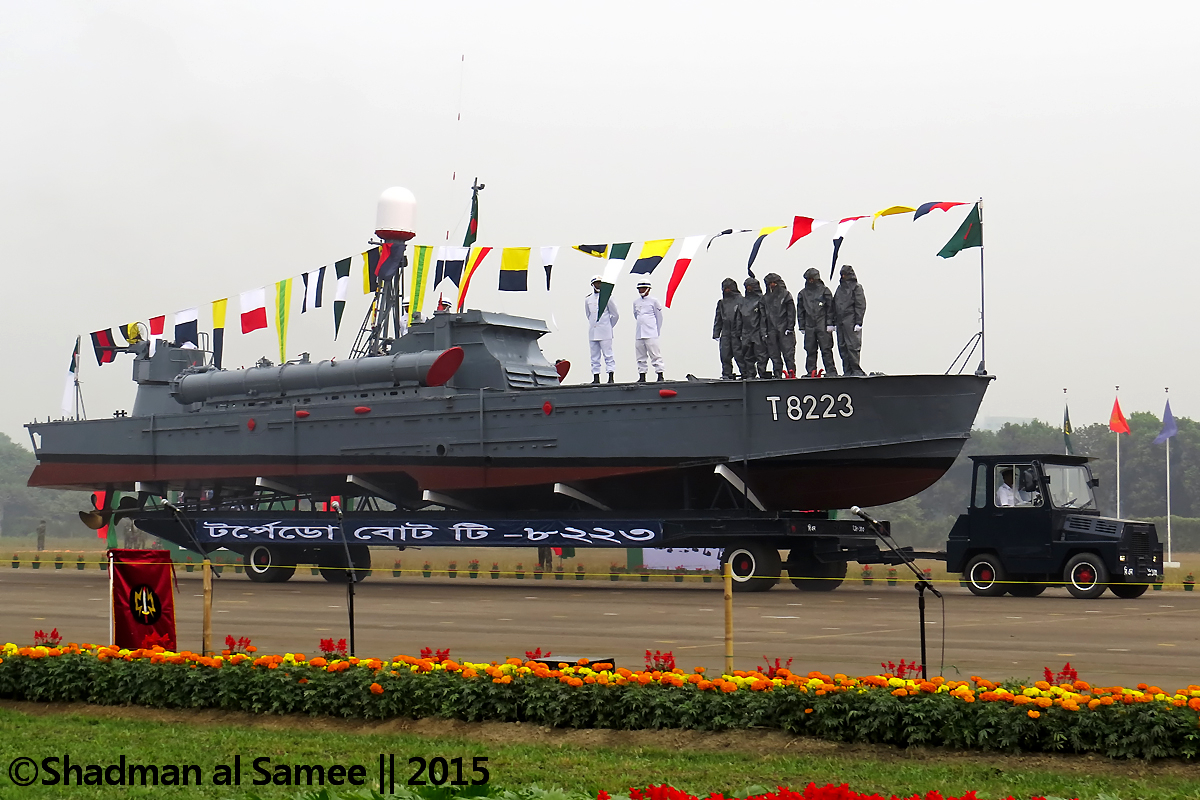
Bangladesh Navy Torpedo Boat in Victory Day Parade.

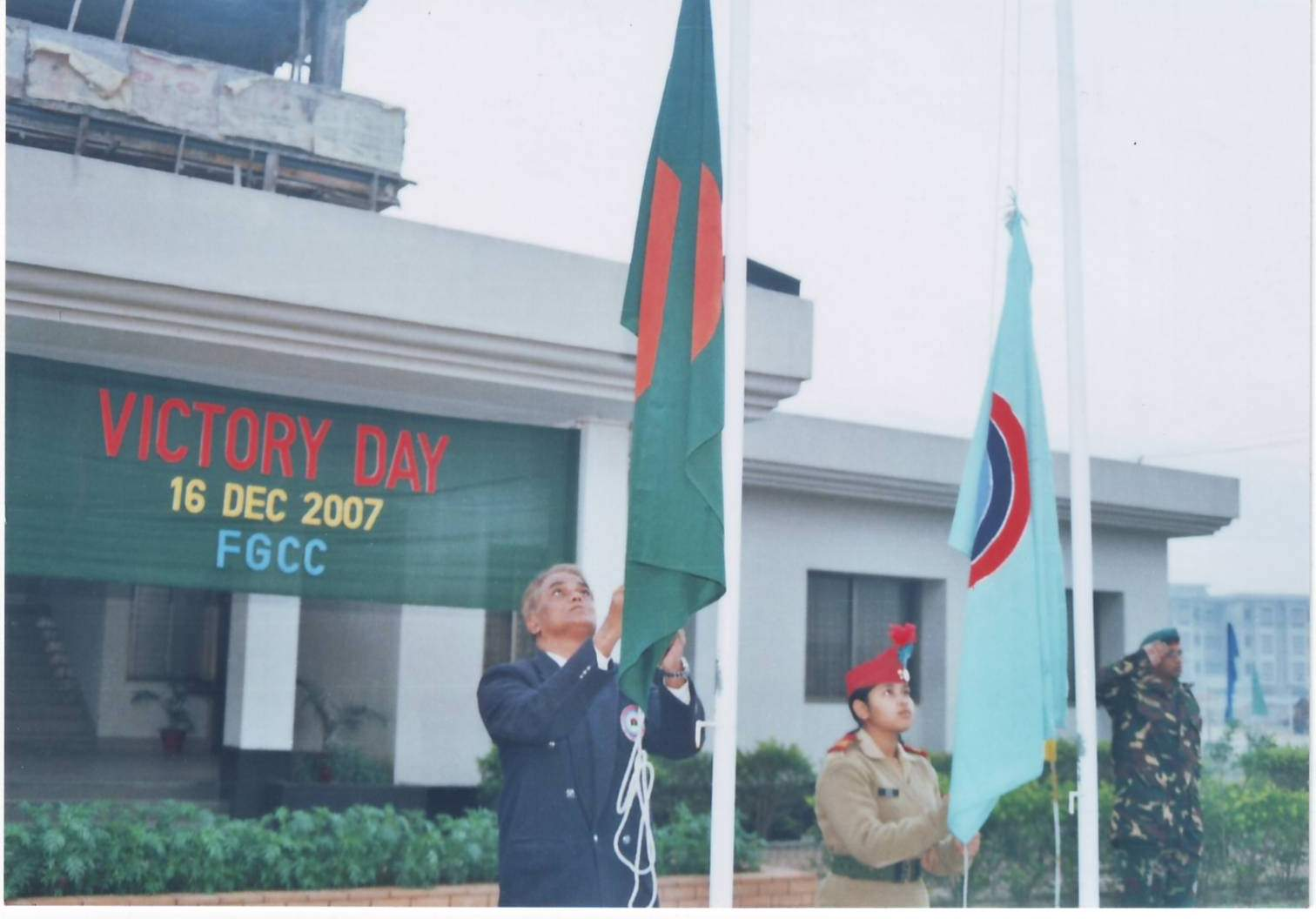
Flag hoisting ceremony at a school

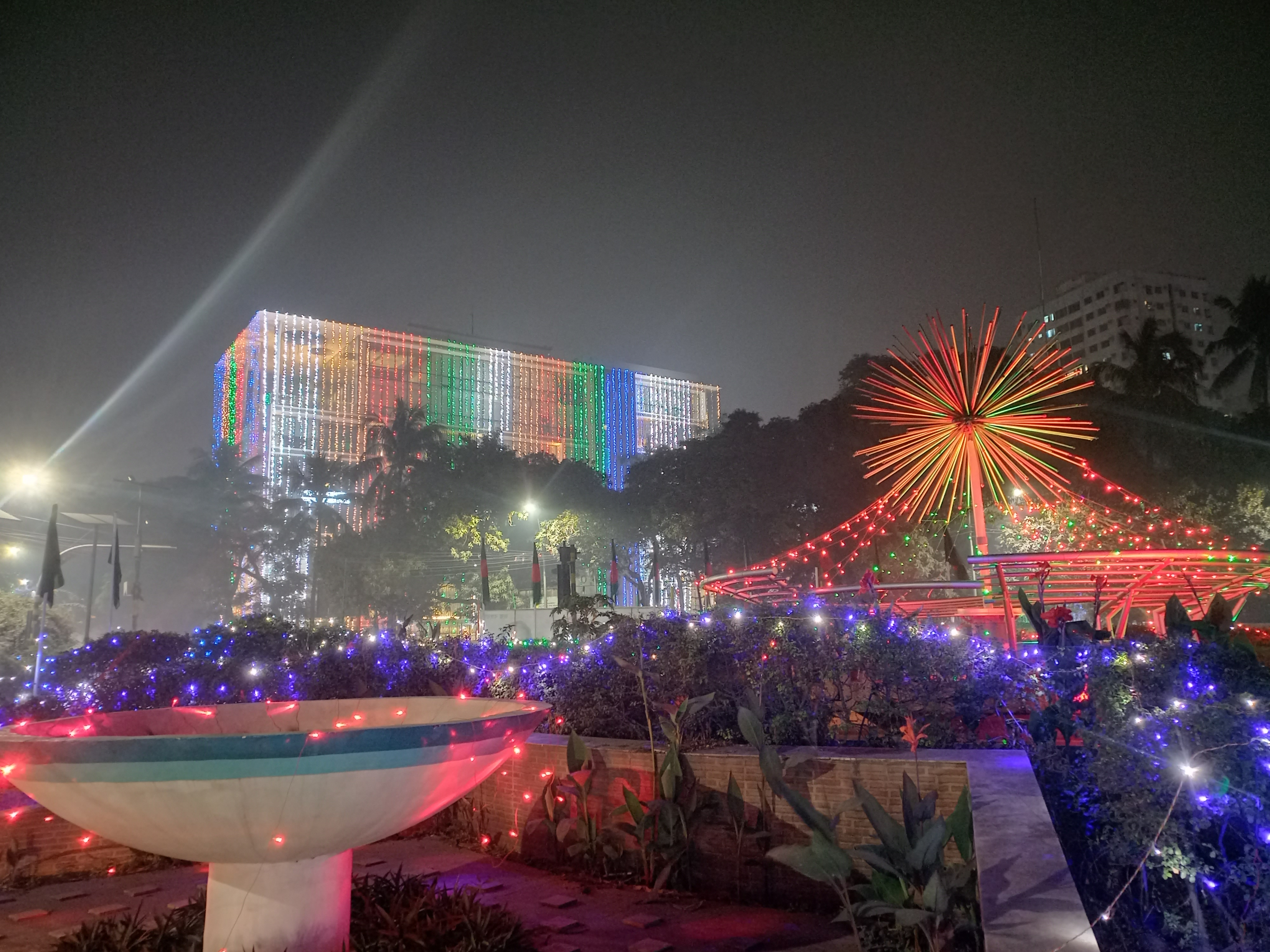
Dhaka's Kadam Fountain decorated with lights.

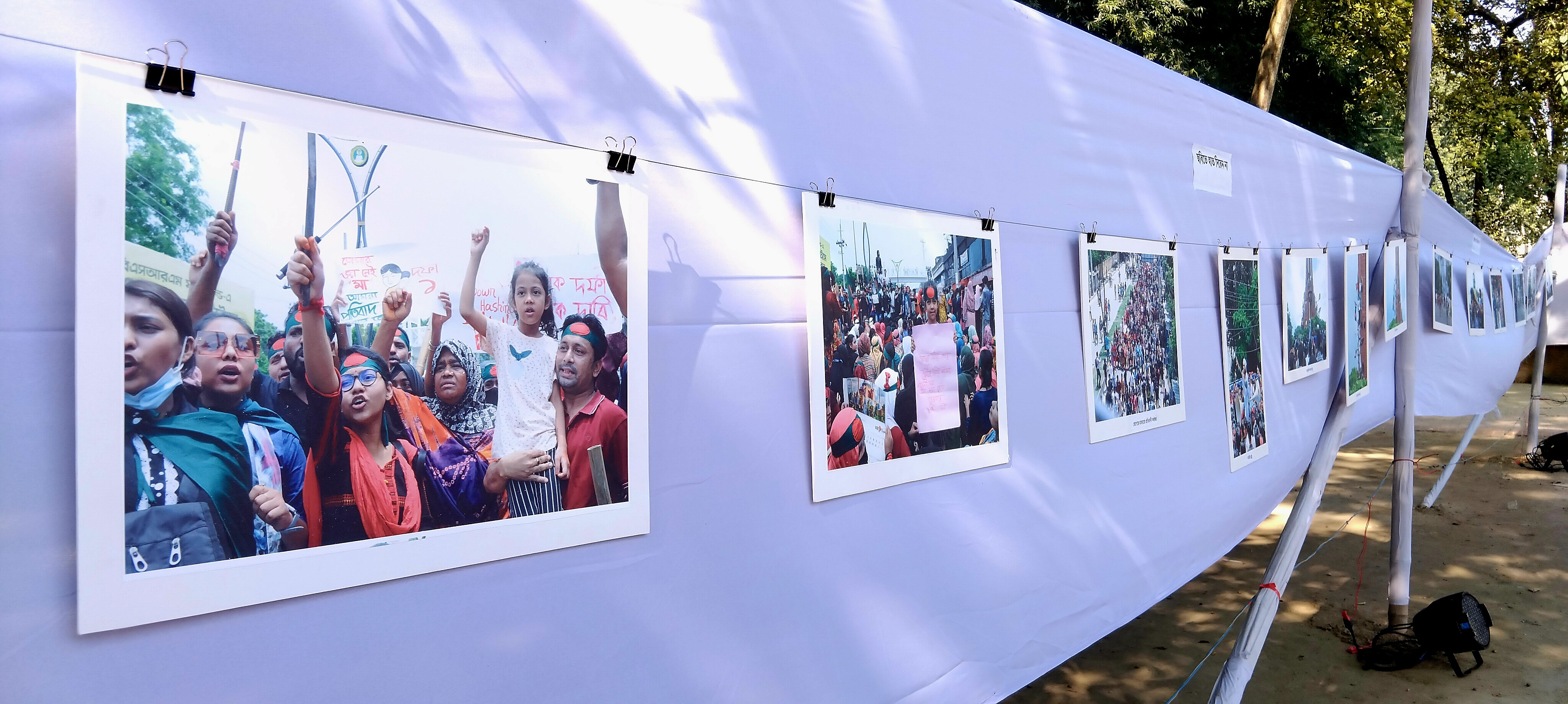
Photo exhibition of July Revolution in Rajshahi University on Victory Day 2024.

== 31- Gun Salute ==
The 31-Gun salute marks the beginning of the Victory day celebration. At sunrise of December 16th, Bangladesh soldiers performs a 31-gun salute, often mistaken for the 21-gun salute, celebrating Bangladesh independence and rise as a sovereign nation. The salute starts with 6 guns, 31 shots are fired with each shot symbolizing the bravery and sacrifice of the freedom fighters. The salute is celebrated with respect.

== In India ==
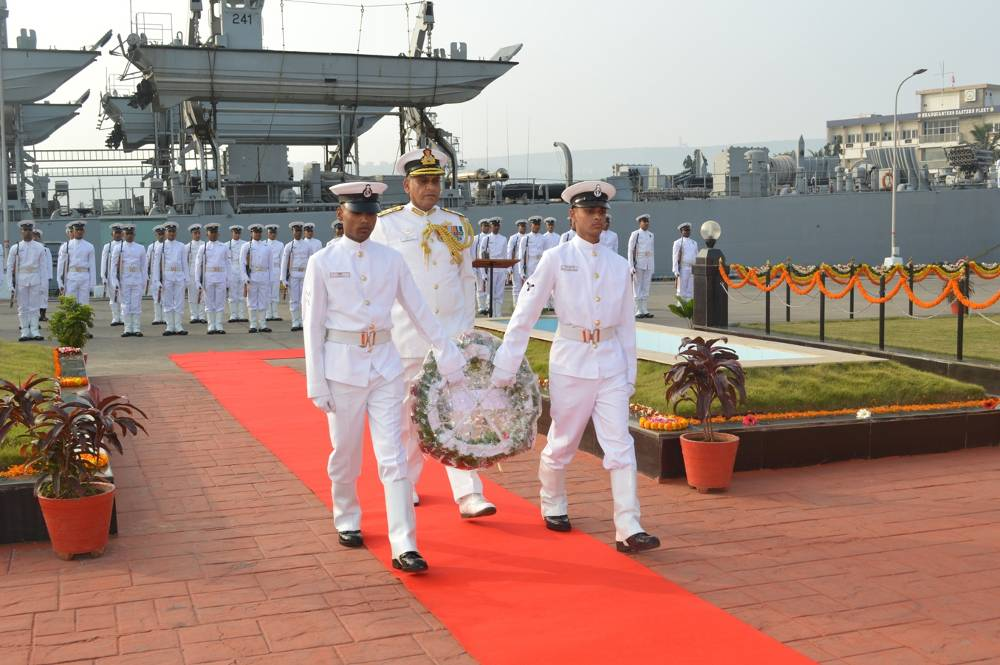
Vice Admiral Bimal Verma laying wreath on Vijay Diwas, 2014

India also observes Victory Day on 16 December as Vijay Diwas to commemorate Indian victory in the Indo-Pakistani war of 1971. The President and the prime minister of India pay honour of the soldiers who fought and died in the war. Functions are also organised all over the country to commemorate the contributions of the Indian Armed Forces. Bangladesh and India also send delegation to each other to exchange greetings.

== Events commemorating Victory Day ==
- 1971: State Bank of Pakistan became Bangladesh Bank.
- 1972: The constitution of the People's Republic of Bangladesh was enacted on 16 December.
- 1973: Gallantry awards of war were declared by Bangladesh Gazette on 15 December.
- 1996: Silver jubilee of victory was celebrated.
- 2013: New world record of the largest human flag was set when 27,117 volunteers gathered at the National Parade Ground holding red and green blocks to form the national flag of Bangladesh.
- 2021: Golden jubilee of victory was celebrated.
- 2025: New world record of the largest flag-parachuting was set when 54 paratroopers jumped from the attitude of approx. 12,000 feet (3,700 m) over the National Parade Ground holding national flags of Bangladesh.

== See also ==
Similar days

- Independence Day
- Bangladesh Genocide Remembrance Day
- Language Martyrs' Day
- Martyred Intellectuals Day
- Victory Day in other countries

Bangladesh Liberation War

- Evolution of Pakistan Eastern Command plan
- Indo-Pakistani wars and conflicts
- Military plans of the Bangladesh Liberation War
- Mitro Bahini order of battle
