= Golden Jubilee of the Independence of Bangladesh =

Celebration of 50 years of independence of Bangladesh

- Logo released by the National Committee on Golden Jubilee Celebration and Implementation of Bangladesh
- Official name: বাংলাদেশের স্বাধীনতার সুবর্ণজয়ন্তী
- Observed by: Bangladesh
- Type: National
- Significance: 50 years of Bangladesh's independence and victory
- Begins: 26 March 2021
- Ends: 31 March 2022
- Related to: Independence of Bangladesh

The Golden Jubilee of Bangladesh's independence (Bengali: বাংলাদেশের স্বাধীনতার সুবর্ণজয়ন্তী, romanized: Bangladesher Shwadhinotar Subornojoyonti), was an annual plan announced by the Government of Bangladesh to commemorate the 50th anniversary of Bangladesh's independence from Pakistan through a nine-month armed liberation war from 26 March to 16 December 1971. The government announced to celebrate the golden jubilee of independence from 26 March 2021 to 16 December 2021. It was later extended to 31 March 2022.

In the lexical language, the term "golden jubilee" basically refers to the 50th anniversary of an event.

== Background ==
On the night of 25 March 1971, the Pakistan army carried out genocide throughout Bangladesh including Dhaka. In this genocide, 6 to 7 thousand ordinary people lost their lives in Dhaka alone. In Bangladesh, this day is known as Genocide Remembrance Day. After midnight (in the first hour of March 26), Bangabandhu Sheikh Mujibur Rahman declared the independence of Bangladesh and the War of Liberation began. Since 1972, Bangladesh has been celebrating March 26 as "Independence Day" as Bangabandhu declared the independence of Bangladesh in the early hours of March 26. Finally, on 16 December 1971, the Pakistani army surrendered, and Bangladesh achieved victory. Bangladesh has been celebrating this day as Victory Day since 1972. The year 2021 marks 50 years since the declaration of independence and victory in the war. Therefore, the year 2021 is celebrated as "Golden Jubilee" to commemorate the 50th anniversary of independence.

In the 2008 general elections, the Awami League in its election manifesto announced "Vision 2021" ahead of the golden jubilee of independence in 2021, where it pledged to turn Bangladesh into a developing, digital and modern country by 2021.

== Early celebration ==
"50 Years of Independence" is written in red and green, the colors of the national flag of Bangladesh.

=== Internal ===
The celebration of the golden jubilee of Bangladesh's independence officially began on 26 March 2021. Along with the golden jubilee, Mujib Year is also celebrated on the occasion of the birth centenary of the Father of the Nation of Bangladesh, Bangabandhu Sheikh Mujibur Rahman. Heads of state of different countries joined the celebrations. Maldivian President Ibrahim Mohamed Solih arrived in Bangladesh on March 17 to attend the combined celebration of Mujib Year and Golden Jubilee of Independence held from March 17 to March 26, 2021, Sri Lankan Prime Minister Mahinda Rajapaksa arrived on March 19; Nepalese President Bidya Devi Bhandari arrived on March 22; Bhutanese Prime Minister Lotay Tshering arrived on March 24 and Indian Prime Minister Narendra Modi arrived on March 26, the Independence Day. Besides, global leaders like Joe Biden, Xi Jinping, Boris Johnson, Vladimir Putin, Justin Trudeau, Yoshihide Suga, Imran Khan, Pope Francis, António Guterres also sent congratulatory messages and praised the progress of Bangladesh.

The Independence Day program was started with 50 gunshots in the early morning of 26 March. President Abdul Hamid and Prime Minister Sheikh Hasina paid rich tributes to the martyrs of the Liberation War by placing wreaths at the National Martyrs' Memorial in Savar at dawn. On this day, the national flag is hoisted with the sunrise in government, semi-government, autonomous and private buildings of Bangladesh.

The main roads and roadways of different cities of the country, including the capital Dhaka, were decorated to celebrate the golden jubilee. Important buildings and establishments are illuminated a few days before Independence Day. The main roads and roadways of different cities of the country, including the capital Dhaka, were decorated to celebrate the golden jubilee. Important buildings and establishments are illuminated a few days before Independence Day.

Special prayers and dua were offered at all religious places of worship across the country on the occasion of the golden jubilee of Bangladesh's independence.

==== COVID-19 ====
Due to the global pandemic of COVID-19, limited attendance was allowed to attend the Golden Jubilee event. Again, various restrictions are imposed on non-spectator events.

=== International ===
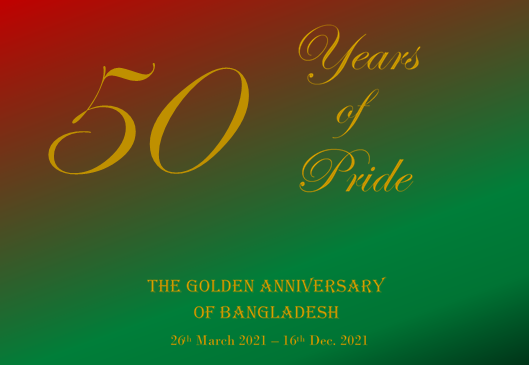
A poster written in English, on the occasion of the Golden Jubilee of Bangladesh

Queen Elizabeth II, Prince of Wales Charles and UK Prime Minister Boris Johnson issued separate messages greeting the people of Bangladesh on the occasion of the Golden Jubilee of Bangladesh's independence. Referring to the contribution of British Bangladeshis to Britain's socio-economic sector, Johnson said, "Six lakh British-Bangladeshis have kept the bond between the two countries alive".

Outside Bangladesh, the Golden Jubilee of Bangladesh's independence was celebrated on 26 March 2021 at the Consulate General of Bangladesh in New York. The Consulate celebrated the golden jubilee virtually with the participation of prominent US politicians, ambassadors/consuls general of different countries in New York, valiant freedom fighters and the Bangladeshi-American community.

On March 26, 2021, an hour-long portrait display and illumination of Bangabandhu's portrait was organized at Burj Khalifa, the world's tallest building in Dubai, United Arab Emirates on the occasion of the golden jubilee of Bangladesh's independence and the birth centenary of Bangabandhu Sheikh Mujibur Rahman.

== Closing celebration ==
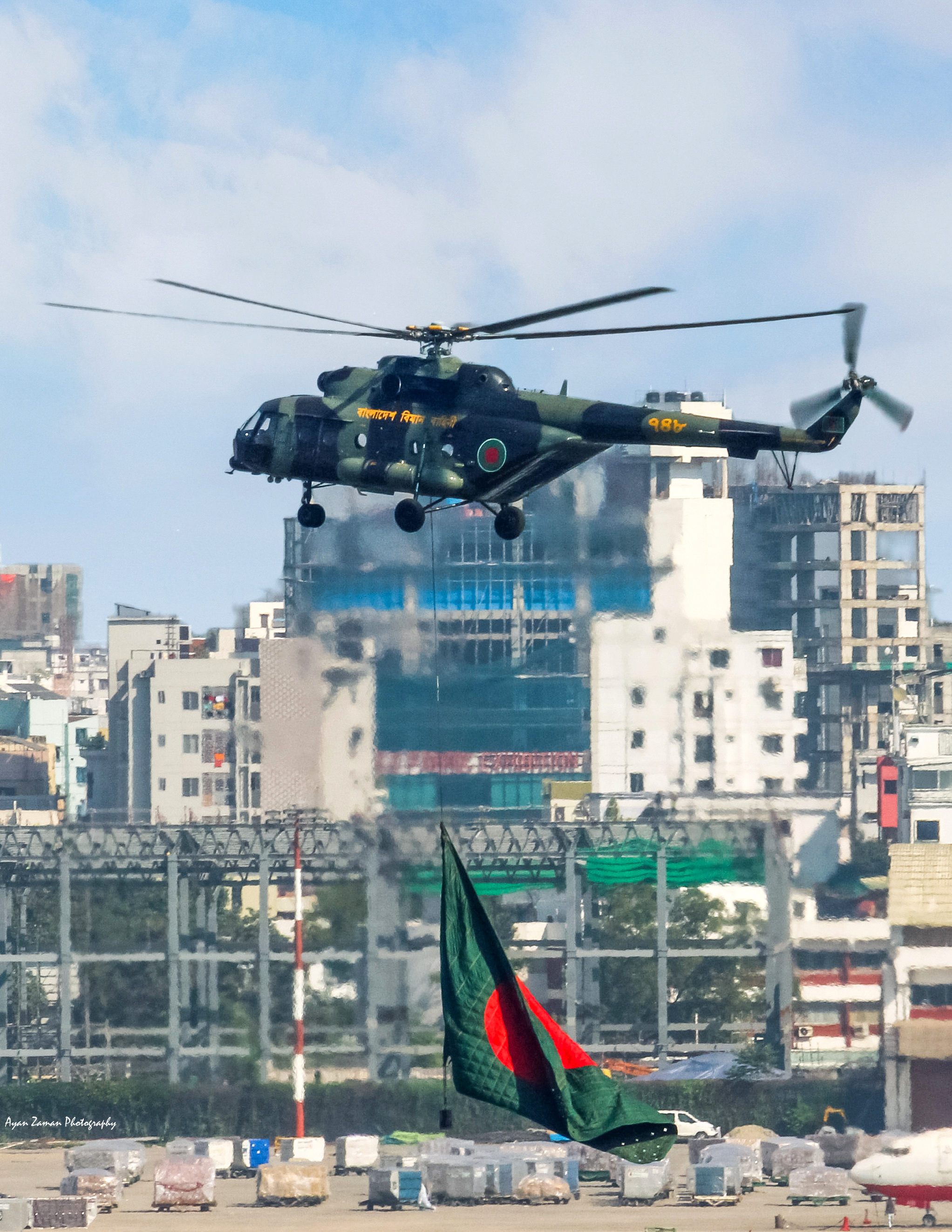
Bangladesh Air Force parade on Victory Day

On the occasion of the Golden Jubilee of Bangladesh's independence, the year-long activities ended with the celebration of the Golden Jubilee of Victory on December 16, 2021. On 16 December 1971, the Pakistan Army surrendered to the joint forces of India and Bangladesh. This day is celebrated as Victory Day in Bangladesh, which completes 50 years on 16 December 2021. Massive initiatives were taken in front of this day.

As part of this program, Indian President Ram Nath Kovind arrived in Dhaka on December 15 on a three-day state visit. And, on December 15, he paid homage to the martyrs and valiant freedom fighters of the Liberation War of Bangladesh at the National Memorial.

On December 16 and 17, a program titled 'Mahavijayar Mahanayak' was held at the South Plaza of the Jatiya Sangsad Bhaban. On December 16, at 4:30 pm, the Prime Minister of Bangladesh, Sheikh Hasina, along with the people of the country, read an 'oath'.

== See also ==
- Mujib Year
