= Mujib Year =

Bangladeshi national holiday

Mujib Centennial
- Logo of Mujib Year, designed by Sabyasachi Hazra
- Also called: Mujib Chironton (The Eternal Mujib)
- Observed by: Bangladesh
- Type: National
- Begins: 17 March 2020
- Ends: 31 March 2022
- Date: 2020–21
- Related to: Sheikh Mujibur Rahman; Golden Jubilee of the Independence of Bangladesh

Mujib Year (Bengali: মুজিব বর্ষ, romanized: Mujib Borsho), also known as Mujib Hundred (Bengali: মুজিব শতবর্ষ, romanized: Mujib Shatoborsho), was the year declared to celebrate on the occasion of the centennial birth anniversary of the founding leader of Bangladesh, Sheikh Mujibur Rahman. The Government of Bangladesh had declared the year 2020–21 as the Mujib Year. This year was celebrated from March 17, 2020, to March 31, 2022 (extended by one year, from 17 March 2021 to 31 March 2022). Bangabandhu Sheikh Mujib was born on March 17, 1920, in Bengal Presidency (now in Tungipara village of the Gopalganj district of Bangladesh).

Again, on March 26, 2021, Bangladesh marked the half-centenary of its independence. The announcement of the year 1971 is particularly important as Sheikh Mujibur Rahman was leading the Bangladesh's struggle for independence actively.

Indian Prime Minister Narendra Modi's visit to Bangladesh was cancelled after the Government of Bangladesh decided to avoid mass-scale celebrations on March 17 following the detection of three cases of coronavirus infection. Modi joined the birth centenary celebration of Bangabandhu Sheikh Mujibur Rahman on March 17 through video conference. Later, all public gatherings and occasions were declared as postponed due to the coronavirus.

Following the global coronavirus outbreak and the identification of infected patients in Bangladesh, on March 8, the Government of Bangladesh and the National Implementation Committee to Celebrate the Birth Centenary announced a small pre-March event in public interest and public welfare. At the same time, it was announced that the visit of the invited heads of state of different countries had also been canceled.

== Global celebration ==
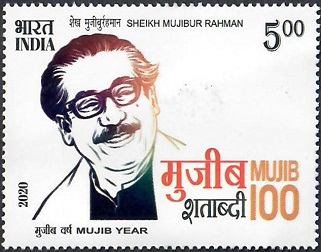
Mujib on a 2021 postage stamp of India

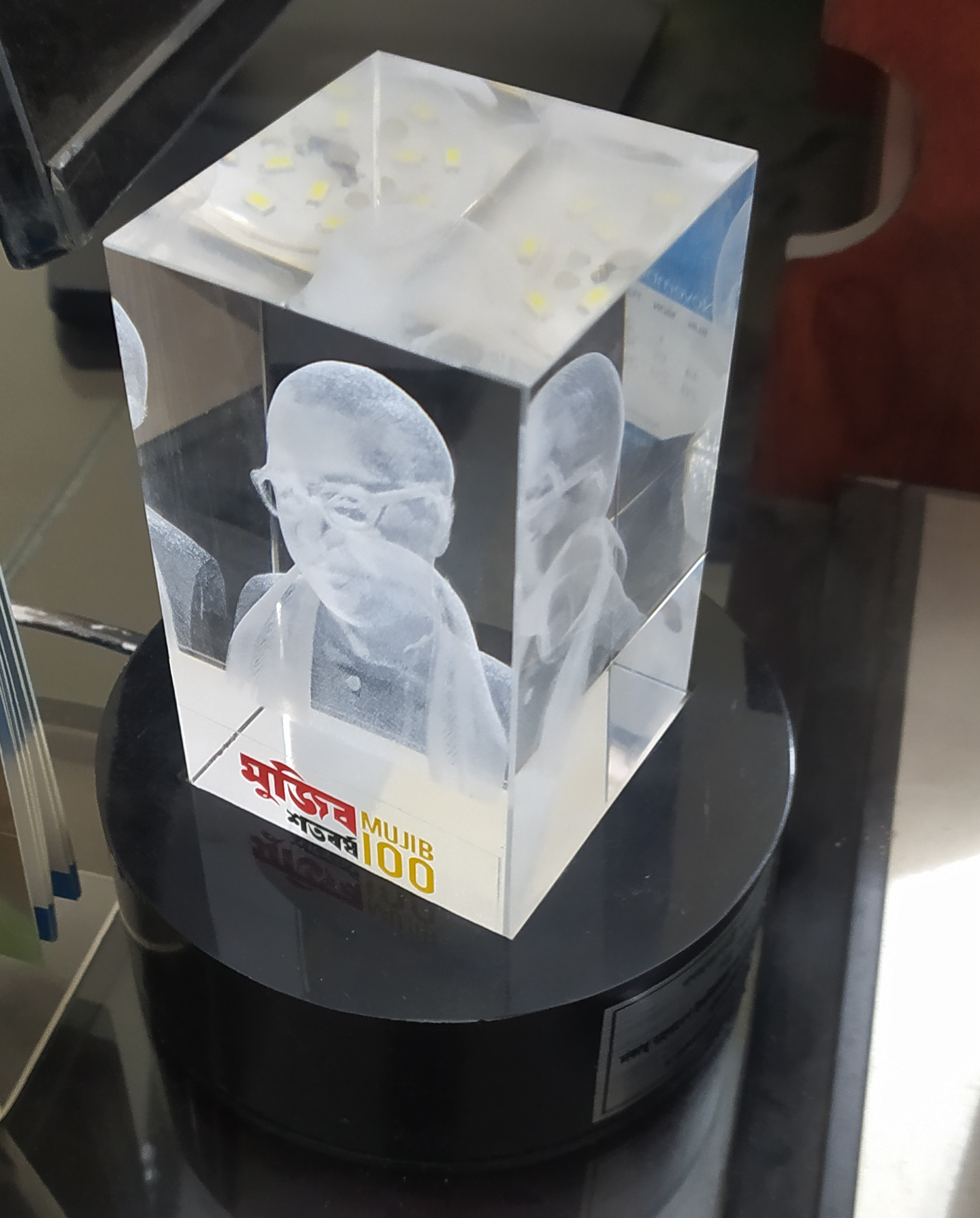
Memorabilia paperweight for the Mujib Year

The UN General Assembly, UNESCO, had decided to jointly celebrate the Mujib Year with Bangladesh at the UNESCO 40th General Assembly. The decision was made in the presence of all UNESCO members on November 12–27 in Paris, held on November 25, 2019.

Washington D.C. Mayor Muriel Bowser has issued a proclamation about Mujib Year. In the proclamation, he had declared Mujib Year from March 17, 2020, to September 30, 2020, marking the birth centenary celebration of Bangabandhu Sheikh Mujibur Rahman.

== Program ==
In addition to promoting the role of Bangabandhu at the grassroots level in Bangladesh's independence struggle, the return anniversary of Bangabandhu, the founding anniversary of the Awami League, National Mourning Day, and the Jail Killing Day celebrated every year as well. There are also plans to produce short films and documentaries to celebrate the birth anniversary and Mujib anniversary. Chief coordinator of the program was Kamal Chowdhury.

== See also ==
- Birthday of Sheikh Mujibur Rahman
- Golden Jubilee of the Independence of Bangladesh
- Vision 2021
