= Vision 2021 =

Political manifesto of Bangladesh Awami League

- Motto: Skilled, Equipped, DigitalReady
- Country: Bangladesh
- Prime Minister(s): Sheikh Hasina
- Ministry: Information and Communication Technology Division; Ministry of Posts, Telecommunications and Information Technology
- Key people: Mustafa Jabbar; Zunaid Ahmed Palak
- Launched: 1 July 2008; 18 years ago
- Status: Active
- Website: digitalbangladesh.gov.bd

Vision 2021 was the political manifesto of the Bangladesh Awami League party before winning the National Elections of 2008. It stands as a political vision of Bangladesh for the year 2021, the Golden Jubilee of the Independence of Bangladesh. The policy has been criticized as a policy emblematic of technological optimism in the context of Bangladesh and the state repression of media, low internet penetration, inadequate electricity generation. The Vision 2021 is an articulation of where this nation needs to be in 2021 – the year which marks the 50th anniversary of Bangladesh's independence.

== Goals ==
The main goal is for Bangladesh to become a middle-income country where poverty will be eradicated,

Further goals include:

- 1. Becoming a participatory democracy with:
  - a. Transparent and accountable Parliament and election process
  - b. Mandatory nominations for directly elected female Members of Parliament
  - c. An independent, efficient, decentralized, and corruption-free judiciary
  - d. Guaranteed protection of human rights and the rule of law
- 2. Having an efficient, accountable, transparent and decentralized system of governance ( includes political framework & people's participation) with:
  - a. Transparent and accountable government administration and processes
  - b. An effective Anti-Corruption Commission
  - c. A decentralized and devolved local government system
- 3. Becoming a poverty-free middle-income country with:
  - a. Promote growth and diversification in agriculture and industry
  - b. Improve global market access and export base
  - c. Development of small-town growth hubs via rural non-farm industries and services
  - d. A skilled workforce
- 4. Having a nation of healthy citizens with:
  - a. Universal access to basic health
  - c. Universal access to safe drinking water and sanitation
- 5. Developing a skilled and creative human resource with:
  - a. Universal access to education
  - b. Improvement of secondary and tertiary education and vocational training
  - c. Gender balance at all levels of education
- 6. Becoming a globally integrated regional economic and commercial hub with:
  - a. Energy
  - b. Infrastructure
  - c. Regional economic integration
  - d. ICT
- 7. Becoming environmentally sustainable with:
  - a. Protection and improved management of natural resources
  - b. Reduction in pollution
  - c. Urban planning and improved waste management
  - d. Effective natural disaster management
- 8. Becoming more inclusive and equitable society with:
  - a. gender equality
  - b. safety nets for vulnerable groups
  - c. inclusion of minorities, economically disadvantaged, and disabled
  - d. Promotion of cultural, religious, and ethnic diversity

== Digital Bangladesh ==
Digital Bangladesh implies the broad use of computers, and embodies the modern philosophy of effective and useful use of technology in terms of implementing the promises in education, health, job placement and poverty reduction. The party underscored a changing attitude, positive thinking and innovative ideas for the successes of "Digital Bangladesh".

The philosophy of "Digital Bangladesh" comprises ensuring people's democracy and human rights, transparency, accountability, establishing justice and ensuring delivery of government services to the citizens of Bangladesh through maximum use of technology, with the ultimate goal being the overall improvement of the daily lifestyle of general people. This includes all classes of people and does not discriminate people in terms of technology.

The government further emphasized on the four elements of "Digital Bangladesh Vision" which are human resource development, people involvement, civil services and use of information technology in business.

== See also ==
- Mapping Bangladesh
- Teletalk
