= Google Map Maker =

Collaborative mapping tool

- Screenshot Screenshot of the town of Ísafjörður, Iceland, in Google Map Maker
- Website type: Web mapping
- Available in: Multilingual
- Successor: Google Maps
- Owner: Google
- Website: www.google.com/mapmaker
- Registration: Yes
- Launched: June 23, 2008; 18 years ago
- Current status: Defunct March 31, 2017; 9 years ago

Google Map Maker was a map editing service launched by Google in June 2008. In geographies where it is hard to find providers of good map data, user contributions were used to increase map quality. Changes to Google Map Maker were intended to appear on Google Maps only after sufficient review by Google moderators. Google Map Maker was used at Google Mapathon events held annually.

In November 2016, Google announced that Google Map Maker would be retired and merged with Google Maps. Google Map Maker was officially shut down on March 31, 2017.

== Interface ==
Using the find or browse tools, contributors were able to add and draw features directly onto a map where the borders had already been drawn, and could add features such as roads, railways, rivers and so on. In addition, users could add specific buildings and services onto the map such as local businesses and services.

Three kinds of drawing tools were available: placemark (a single point of interest on the map), line (for drawing roads, railways, rivers, and the like) and polygon (for defining boundaries and borders, adding parks, lakes and other large features). The approach encouraged by users and by Google was to trace features such as roads from the existing satellite imagery. This approach was not useful in areas with poor satellite imagery, and users consequently created less map data in those areas.

New users' contributions were moderated by more experienced users or reviewers at Google to ensure quality and prevent vandalism. As users made more successful contributions, their edits were less closely monitored and may have been published on the map straight away. Certain larger features may have taken a long time to appear on the map as they were waiting to be rendered by the server.

Contributors could assign areas of the map as their 'neighbourhood', that is an area they know well enough to make detailed contributions to. Users could also moderate the contributions of others within their neighbourhood. This information was private; the neighbourhood a user selected was not publicly associated with the users' account.

== Availability ==
As of 6 March 2016, the service was available in Bangladesh, Belarus, Bosnia and Herzegovina, Brazil, Cambodia, Canada, Costa Rica, Croatia, Czech Republic, Democratic Republic of the Congo, Denmark (not including Greenland and the Faroe Islands), Egypt, El Salvador, Estonia, France, Georgia, Germany, Hungary, India, Iran, Iraq, Italy, Kazakhstan, Kuwait, Macedonia, Malaysia, Mexico, Moldova, Morocco, Nepal, the Netherlands, New Zealand, Nigeria, Pakistan, Panama, Peru, the Philippines, Poland, Puerto Rico, Romania, Russia, Serbia, Slovakia, Saudi Arabia, Sri Lanka, Sweden, Taiwan, Ukraine, the United Kingdom, the United States, Venezuela, and Vietnam.

== 2015 vandalism incident ==
In April 2015, Google removed user-created Map Maker content that showed an "Android robot urinating on the Apple logo" and a separate feature saying "Google review policy is crap", after they were discovered on Google Maps. Following the "large scale prank", Google disabled auto-approval and user moderation, and on 8 May, the Map Maker team announced that editing would be temporarily disabled worldwide as of 12 May 2015.

Google reenabled the service in six countries in August 2015, with plans to enable in other countries in the following weeks. On 10 August, editing was re-opened to Bangladesh, Brazil, Canada, India, the Philippines, and Ukraine; Google relied on regional moderators to review edits as an extra precaution, in addition to automated and human moderation. On 26 August, Google Map Maker re-opened to 45 more countries.

== Criticism ==
Map Maker required contributors to grant Google a "... perpetual, irrevocable, worldwide, royalty-free, and non-exclusive license to reproduce, adapt, modify, translate, publish, publicly perform, publicly display, distribute, and create derivative works of the User Submission". While Google provided a form to request Map Maker data downloads, it provided no programmatic access to data. There were expressions of concern that Google was taking advantage of open communities, and large contributors to Map Maker, such as the World Bank's project partnering with Google, were viewed critically.

== See also ==
- Yandex Map Editor
- Mapping Bangladesh
- Here Map Creator
- OpenStreetMap
- Wikimapia
