= Mujib: The Making of a Nation =

2023 Bengali biopic by Shyam Benegal

- Theatrical release poster
- Original title: মুজিব: একটি জাতির রূপকার
- Directed by: Shyam Benegal
- Screenplay by: Atul Tiwari; Shama Zaidi
- Based on: Research paper by Gowher Rizvi
- Produced by: MoIB; MIB
- Starring: Arifin Shuvoo; Nusrat Imrose; Rajit Kapur; Riaz Ahmed; Dilara Zaman; Deepak Antani; Tauquir Ahmed; Raisul Islam Asad
- Narrated by: Nusrat Imrose
- Cinematography: Akashdeep Pandey
- Edited by: Aseem Sinha
- Music by: Shantanu Moitra
- Production companies: BFDC; NFDC
- Distributed by: Jaaz Multimedia; Panorama Studios
- Release dates: 13 September 2023 (Toronto); 13 October 2023 (Bangladesh); 27 October 2023 (India, UK)
- Running time: 178 minutes
- Countries: Bangladesh; India
- Languages: Bengali; Hindi
- Budget: $10 million
- Box office: $0.55 million (Note: BFDC sources reported a gross of approximately ৳19.1 million ($176,864) during its first phase of release in Bangladesh. In India, it grossed ₹2.73 crore ($330,559) in 8 days. Box Office Mojo reported $15,539 from the UK and UAE in the month of its release. The Numbers reported $21,110 from Australia. Combined, these figures total $544,072.)

Mujib: The Making of a Nation (Bengali: মুজিব: একটি জাতির রূপকার, romanized: Mujib: Ekti Jaatir Rupakar), is a 2023 epic biographical film based on the life of Sheikh Mujibur Rahman, the founding father and first president of Bangladesh who is popularly known as Bangabandhu (lit. 'Friend of Bengal'). A co-production between Bangladesh and India, the film was directed by Shyam Benegal and stars Arifin Shuvoo in the titular role.

The film was produced on the occasion of Mujib Year. Arifin Shuvoo, Nusrat Imrose Tisha and Zayed Khan took only ৳1 (Note: Around US$0.012 as of June 2021) as a symbolic payment for acting in this film. The film was scheduled to start production on 18 March 2020, a day after Bangabandhu's birth centenary, but it was delayed due to the COVID-19 pandemic.

Its art director is Nitish Roy. Pia Benegal is responsible for costume of the film as costume director. Dayal Nihalani is the associate Director. Its screenplay was done by Atul Tiwari and Shama Zaidi. Its executive producer is Nujhat Yasmin. Its line producer is Mohammad Hossain Jaimy. Its dialogue writer, script supervisor, and dialogue coach is Sadhana Ahmed. Its casting director is Shyam Rawat and Baharuddin Khelon.

This is the first government produced biopic about Sheikh Mujibur Rahman. The film also marks the final directorial work of Benegal. Upon release, it received a favorable box office opening alongside critical praise, despite some noted flaws. The film won two international awards and received three domestic nominations including Best Actor and Best Actress.

== Plot ==
The film commences with an introductory note:

This film is a tribute to Bangabandhu Sheikh Mujibur Rahman - the Father of the Nation of Bangladesh. It is largely based on true events. Any omission, addition, alteration or dramatisation of incidents, characters, places, time-lines are for the clarity of story-telling and not intended to hurt anyone's feelings, sentiments, faith or beliefs. There is no intention whatsoever to outrage, insult, wound, offend or hurt any religion or religious sentiments or beliefs or feelings of any person(s), community or class of person(s), nor is there any intention to malign, defame or slander any place, region, country, government & its policies, community, person(s) or class of person(s) in any way.

The story begins on 10 January 1972, as Sheikh Mujibur Rahman returns to Bangladesh after being imprisoned in Pakistan throughout the nine-month Liberation War. He is welcomed by a massive crowd. At the Racecourse Ground in Dhaka, Mujib addresses the newly independent nation, pays tribute to those who fought for independence, and calls for food, clothing, employment, democracy, socialism and secularism. He thanks India for its support. After the public reception, Mujib meets with his family.

The narrative then moves back to Mujib's youth. As a schoolboy, he meets Huseyn Shaheed Suhrawardy and impresses him by raising the issue of funding for his school. Later, while studying in Kolkata, he joins Suhrawardy's political activities and begins developing as a political organizer. He marries Fazilatunnesa, known as Renu, who supports his political career despite his frequent absence from home. Mujib becomes increasingly involved in politics.

After the partition of British India and the creation of Pakistan, Mujib campaigns for Bengali cultural and political rights. He promotes Bengali identity and secularism, arguing that Muslims and Hindus should live together in harmony. After Muhammad Ali Jinnah's declaration that Urdu would be Pakistan's sole state language, he becomes involved in the movement to establish Bangla as a state language and is repeatedly arrested for his political activities. Imprisoned Mujib later begins a hunger strike, joined by Mohiuddin Ahmed. News of students being killed on 21 February 1952 reaches him in prison, prompting him to call the date Martyrs' Day. His deteriorating health eventually leads to his transfer to his family home in Tungipara.

In the 1954 provincial election, Mujib campaigns among ordinary people and wins a seat. His growing popularity leads him toward a stronger demand for autonomy for East Pakistan. Following Suhrawardy's death, Mujib takes a more prominent position within the Awami League and begins advocating the Six-Point Programme. In a political meeting, he refers to East Pakistan as “Bangladesh” and presents the six demands for Bengali autonomy. He is subsequently arrested again.

His repeated arrests become a regular part of his political struggle, while his family continues to support his activities. His wife warns him about the dangers surrounding the Agartala case, while their children also become involved in the political movement. Charged with sedition in the Agartala Conspiracy Case, Mujib is interrogated by Pakistani authorities and rejects accusations that he conspired with India against Pakistan. After his release following an uprising in February 1969, he receives a huge public reception and is given the title “Bangabandhu” meaning "Friend of Bengal".

The 1970 general election brings Mujib's Awami League a majority in Pakistan's National Assembly. In a meeting with Zulfikar Ali Bhutto, Mujib insists that the election result must be respected and that the Six-Point Programme must be implemented. Bhutto objects to Mujib becoming Pakistan's prime minister and warns that West Pakistanis will not accept a Bengali leadership. Mujib refuses to abandon his demands and calls for the Non-cooperation movement.

As negotiations with General Yahya Khan collapse, political tensions rise in East Pakistan. Before the 7 March 1971 speech, student leaders urge Mujib to declare independence immediately, while Tajuddin Ahmad warns of the consequences of doing so prematurely. Mujib chooses his own course and addresses the massive gathering at the Racecourse Ground, calling on Bengalis to prepare for the struggle while leaving the path toward independence open.

When Yahya Khan leaves Dhaka without reaching an agreement, Khondaker Mushtaq Ahmed proposes that the Awami League leadership flee to India. Mujib rejects the idea and decides to remain at his Dhanmondi residence, arguing that the army would burn Dhaka while searching for him if he left. On 25 March, as Operation Searchlight begins, Mujib writes the proclamation of Bangladesh's independence. Pakistani soldiers arrive at his residence, and after bidding farewell to his family, he is arrested.

Mujib is taken to West Pakistan and imprisoned while the Liberation War continues. His family remains under Pakistani custody, and his home in Tungipara is burned by Pakistani soldiers. His sons Sheikh Kamal and Sheikh Jamal escaped and join the liberation war. Meanwhile, the war intensifies, with the Mukti Bahini fighting Pakistani forces and India supporting the Bengali independence. Mujib is eventually sentenced to death for treason. While awaiting execution, he hears soldiers digging his grave and calmly recites from the Quran.

After Pakistan's surrender, Mujib's family is released. The Pakistani flag is replaced with the flag of Bangladesh on the buildings. Mujib is freed and returns to Bangladesh on 10 January 1972. As leader of the new country, he faces the task of rebuilding after the war. He lists the return of millions of refugees, restoration of law and order, reconstruction of communications and infrastructure, and the creation of a constitution among the country's immediate achievements. The first national election of independent Bangladesh follows.

Postwar famine and political instability create further difficulties. Mujib announces the formation of BAKSAL as a temporary one-party political system, promising a return to parliamentary democracy after three years. He seeks the support and advice of senior political figures, including Mawlana Bhasani. Pro-Mujib supporters gather in Dhaka and chant slogans identifying him with the state, while the narration attributes the country's instability to political extremists and elements within the military.

At a wedding reception for Mujib's sons, an Indian representative privately warns him of a possible military coup. Mujib dismisses the warning, saying that no Bengali would shoot him because they are his people. Meanwhile, Khondaker Mushtaq and Taheruddin Thakur meets Major General Ziaur Rahman and discusses removing Mujib. The two later appear at the wedding reception, where Ziaur Rahman watches as the warning about a possible coup is delivered.

On 15 August 1975, Mujib's residence comes under attack. Sheikh Kamal, Sheikh Jamal, Sheikh Naser, Fazilatunnesa Mujib and other members of the family are killed. Mujib confronts the attackers before being shot. His wife is killed shortly afterward, and his youngest son Sheikh Russel is also killed. The attack ends Mujib's life and that of most of his immediate family. The story concludes at Mujib's mausoleum in Tungipara.

== Cast ==
- Arifin Shuvoo as Sheikh Mujibur Rahman (a.k.a. Bangabandhu)
  - Dibya Joyti as younger Sheikh Mujibur Rahman
- Nusrat Imrose Tisha as Renu (Sheikh Fazilatunnesa Mujib)
  - Prarthana Fardin Dighi as younger Renu
  - Srija Bhattacharjee as Renu, aged 5–7
- Nusraat Faria as Sheikh Hasina
  - Adrija Sinha as Sheikh Hasina, between the ages of 8 and 12 years.
  - Maitreyee as child Sheikh Hasina
- Subroto Sarkar as Sheikh Naser
  - Diptesh Khera as younger Sheikh Naser
- Shahidul Alam Sachchu as A. K. Fazlul Huq
- Deepak Antani as Mahatma Gandhi
- Rahul Singh as Muhammad Ali Jinnah
- Fazlur Rahman Babu as Khondaker Mostaq Ahmad
- Raisul Islam Asad as Abdul Hamid Khan Bhashani
- Taju Meghani Kojaria as Alema Khatun (Bhashani's Wife)
- Riaz Ahmed as Tajuddin Ahmad
  - Mohammad Rafiq as younger Tajuddin Ahmad
- Gazi Rakayet as Abdul Hamid, Renu's grandfather
- Gayasuddin Sheikh as M. A. Wazed Miah, Hasina's husband
- Abeer Soofi as Major Ashok Kumar Tara, Indian army official
- Tushar Khan as Manik Mia
- Indira Gandhi as herself (archival footage)
- Rajit Kapur as Zulfikar Ali Bhutto
- Anoop Puri as Yahya Khan, Pakistani president
- Raajan Modi as Payenda Khan, Punjabi army chief
- Amit Ghosh as EPR Announcer
- Sadman Prottoy as Oli Ahad
- Krishnakali Ganguli as Helen
- Mehmud Siddique as Dr. Kamal Hossain
- Prince Adhikari as Sheikh Russel
  - Saubhagya Makhija as child Sheikh Russel
- Shaikh Khan as Abdur Rahman Sheikh Roma
- Santilal Mukherjee as Indian High Commissioner (Dhaka)
- Manmeet Singh as Khushwant Singh, Indian journalist
- Aleef Chowdhury as Mahbub Alam Chashi
- Dinpaal Ganguly as Magistrate (Dhaka Session Court)
- Ujjwal Chopra as pakistani army major
- Sudeep Sarangi as Deputy jailor (Dhaka)
- Mostafizur Noor Imran as Sheikh Fazlul Haque Moni
- Dronya Shenoy as Arzu Moni (Moni's wife)
- Hammad as child Sajeeb Wazed Joy
- Parineeta as child Saima Wazed
- Khairul Alam Sabuj as the father of Bangabandhu, Sheikh Lutfar Rahman 65–94 years.
  - Chanchal Chowdhury as Sheikh Lutfar Rahman between the ages of 45 and 65 years
- Dilara Zaman as the mother of Bangabandhu, Sayera Khatun
  - Sangeeta Chowdhury as younger Sayera Khatun
- Tauquir Ahmed as Huseyn Shaheed Suhrawardy
- Anjum Khan as Akhter Jahan, Suhrawardy's daughter
- Sayem Samad as Syed Nazrul Islam
  - Arif Huq as young Syed Nazrul Islam
- Somu Chowdhury as Qamaruzzaman
- Khalilur Rahman Kaderi as Mansur Ali
- Abhijit Sen Gupta as General MAG Osmani
- Ziaul Hasan Kislu as Abu Sayeed Chowdhury
- Razu Sarker as General Ayub Khan
- Sabila Nur as Sheikh Rehana
  - Saumili Ghosh as younger Sheikh Rehana
  - Kayra Gowda as child Sheikh Rehana
- Somnath Chatterjee as Sheikh Kamal
  - Neil Shetty as younger Sheikh Kamal between the ages of 8 and 12 years.
  - Moksh Jain as younger Sheikh Kamal under the age of 5.
- Sharif Siraj as Sheikh Jamal
  - Puran Nath as younger Sheikh Jamal
  - Nick Nag as child Sheikh Jamal
- Jayita Mahalanobish as an old lady
- Siam Ahmed as Shamsul Huq
- Swastik Barman as Abdur Rab Serniabat
- Naziba Bashar as Sultana Kamal
- Zayed Khan as General Tikka Khan
- Sapan Bhattacharjee as AFM Mohitul Islam, Mujib's personal assistant
- Ashiul Islam as Mohiuddin Ahmed
- Kamrul Hasan as Taheruddin Thakur
- A.K. Azad Setu as Ziaur Rahman
- Rohan Roy as S.H.M.B Noor Chowdhury, Mujib's assassin
- Chandra Shekhar Dutta as Mohammad Bazlul Huda, partner of Noor
- Aniruddho Paul as Moslemuddin
- Elina Shammi as Khaleda Zia
- Nairuj Sifat as Parveen Jamal Rosy
- Sabbir Hossain as Tofail Ahmed
- Arup Paul as the Head of Gopalganj Missionary School

== Production ==
=== Background ===
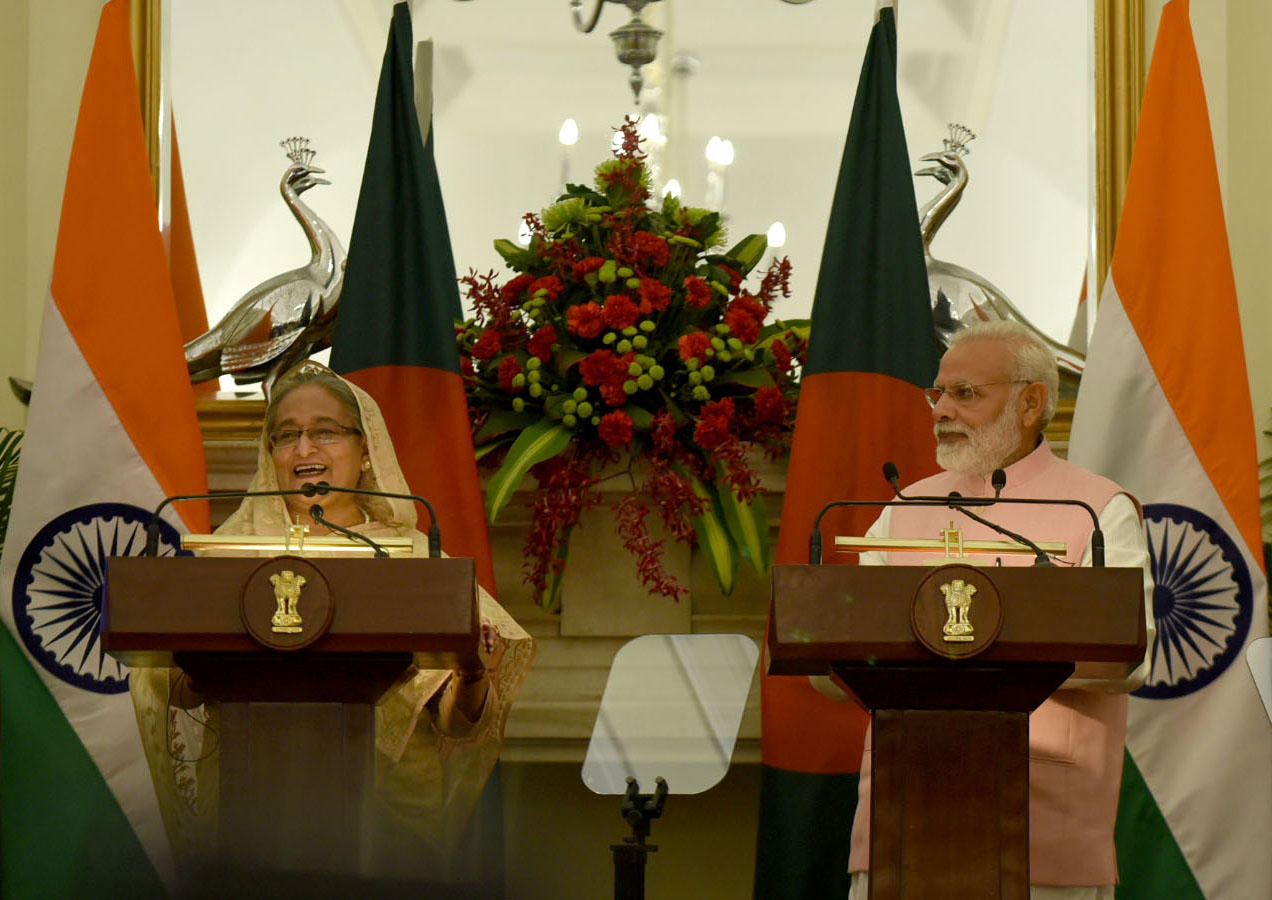
Sheikh Hasina and Narendra Modi at Hyderabad House in 2017

Until 2016, many people wanted to make a film based on the life story of Bangabandhu, but their initiative was not successful. (Note: No feature film about Sheikh Mujibur Rahman has been released before 2021. In 2021, two films were released about him titled Tungiparar Miya Bhai and Chironjeeb Mujib.) Even before the production of this film, there was a demand to make a biographical film of Bangabandhu as a state initiative. Actor Raj from East Pakistan announced to make a film about him titled Bangabandhu in 1970. In an interview given to the weekly Chitrali in 1988, Farooque revealed his plan to make a film about Mujib. It was reported by India Today in 2008 that Abdul Gaffar Chowdhury planned to make a film about Bangabandhu titled The Poet of Politics. It was rumored that it would be directed by Shyam Benegal and Amitabh Bachchan would be cast as the main character in the film. However, the film was not made. In 2010, Vibgyor Films had planned to make a film about Bangabandhu in Hollywood. It was learned that the shooting of the film was scheduled to start in 2011. Giasuddin Selim wanted to make a film based on The Unfinished Memoirs, an autobiography book of Mujib, but he backed out due to lack of budget. On 3 December 2015, the then Minister of Cultural Affairs named Asaduzzaman Noor officially announced the Hasina government's desire to make a biopic of Sheikh Mujibur Rahman. He also said that his ministry has discussed the matter with the Prime Minister and she has given the green signal. Later, Narendra Modi, the Indian prime minister, informed to the Bangladeshi prime minister named Sheikh Hasina the desire to produce a film on the life of her father by his government. His proposal was liked by her. However, in that time, Hasina suggested to Modi that Bangladesh should jointly produce the proposed film with India. On 17 August 2016, Venkaiah Naidu, the then information minister of India, declared the acceptance of the proposal to assist the production of the biographical film of Bangabandhu by the then information minister of Bangladesh Hasanul Haq Inu. On 8 April 2017, in the presence of Sheikh Hasina at the Hyderabad House in New Delhi, Narendra Modi officially announced the joint-production of the film.

=== Development ===
I'm not trying to make a Bollywood blockbuster – as I mentioned, I want to make a Bangladeshi film, not a commercial movie. The focus of this biopic is completely different, you have to understand it. There's a nation's emotions, there's a question of their feelings – I have to respect that, haven't I?

— Shyam Benegal during an interview for the film.

On 27 August 2017, an agreement was signed between the Government of Bangladesh and India in the capital of India. One of the purposes of the agreement was to make a film on Bangabandhu. On 18 March 2018, the Government of Bangladesh announced that the preliminary work of making the film would start from that year. A film committee was formed with 19 people from Bangladesh and India to implement the film project. The coordinator of the committee was the additional secretary of the Ministry of Information of Bangladesh. Hasanul Haq Inu organized several meetings regarding Bangabandhu's biopic during his tenure as Information Minister. Film directors and experts participating in the meetings gave their opinion in favor of directing the film by any director of the country. So it was initially decided that the film would be directed by Nasiruddin Yousuff. But the film committee chose Shyam Benegal as the director when three directors from India were nominated in July 2018 to direct the film. (Note: Other two directors were Goutam Ghose and Kaushik Ganguly) Shyam Benegal accepted the offer to direct the film as he felt that the main character of the film was an interesting character in his time. (Note: Columnist Rahman Chowdhury claimed to have met Shyam Benegal in October 2015 and learned that he was then engaged in pre-production of a film based on the Indian independence movement.) On 27 August 2018, Tarana Halim officially announced his name as the director of the film on behalf of the Government of Bangladesh. In 2019, it was announced that a three-member expert team from Bangladesh would be formed to assist the film's director. It was decided that the team would include a historian, an acquaintance of Mujib and an experienced film personality. Sheikh Hasina initially did not want to be included in the production but Benegal later forced her. On 1 April 2019, Shyam Benegal visited Bangladesh to discuss the film project with Sheikh Hasina and film associates. The budget of the film was set at est. ৳40 crore (US$4.82 million) at a meeting held in New Delhi on 7 May 2019. But it was learned later from Nuzhat Yeasmin, one of executive producers of the film that the budget of this film is ৳83 crore (US$10 million). (Note: Around US$10 million as of June 2021) Bangladesh has given ৳50 crore (US$6.02 million) of the budget and India has given ৳33 crore (US$3.98 million). After the Bangladesh delegation visited India on 7 May 2019 and discussed with the Indians, the matter of making the film was finalized. On 6 October 2019, the director talked with Sheikh Hasina in a meeting at New Delhi for the film. Later another film related agreement was finalised on 14 January 2020. Shyam Benegal further said that this is a Bengali nationalist film. Sheikh Hasina wanted the language of the film to be in English or Hindi or Urdu. But Shyam Benegal decided to make the film in Bengali, the state language of Bangladesh. (Note: Shyam Benegal wanted the language of the film to be Bengali as he thought that making the film in another language would disrespect the Bengali language movement.) Benegal does not know Bengali, for this reason he had to enlist the help of translators. Two years later its official title was announced. The director gave the name to the film as the meaning of Mujib (lit. 'Answerer') is significant.

=== Character ===
Character development of Sheikh Mujibur Rahman was a difficult task for Benegal. As steadfast as Mujib was to his political ideals and movements, he gave importance to his family And he was more of a family man than all the important personalities of the Indian subcontinent. And so his life is presented in this film from an emotional point of view. The director said that Mujib will be portrayed in a balanced manner in the film.

=== Writing ===
Atul Tiwari planned to visit Bangladesh in May 2019 as part of his film research. Piplu Khan was his helper and research related assistant. Atul Tiwari visited Bangladesh with Shama Zaidi on 19 May and investigated the biopic related historical places. As part of the research for the film, Sheikh Hasina assisted the director with information about her father's life. Although the film script was reviewed by her, she did not demand any major change in the script. In order to complete the screenplay, Shama Zaidi and Atul Tiwari adhered to research paper on the main character of the film written by Gowher Rizvi. As part of the research, the screenwriters collected information from people associated with Bangabandhu. A scriptwriters' committee was formed to write the script for the film. Anam Biswas, Gias Uddin Selim, Shihab Shaheen and Sadhana Ahmed were selected as members of this committee. Asaduzzaman Noor assisted the members as an advisor to the committee. All kinds of historical works from Bangladesh, India and Pakistan have been taken for its screenplay. From February to August 2020, many minor corrections was made to the screenplay of the film.

=== Casting ===
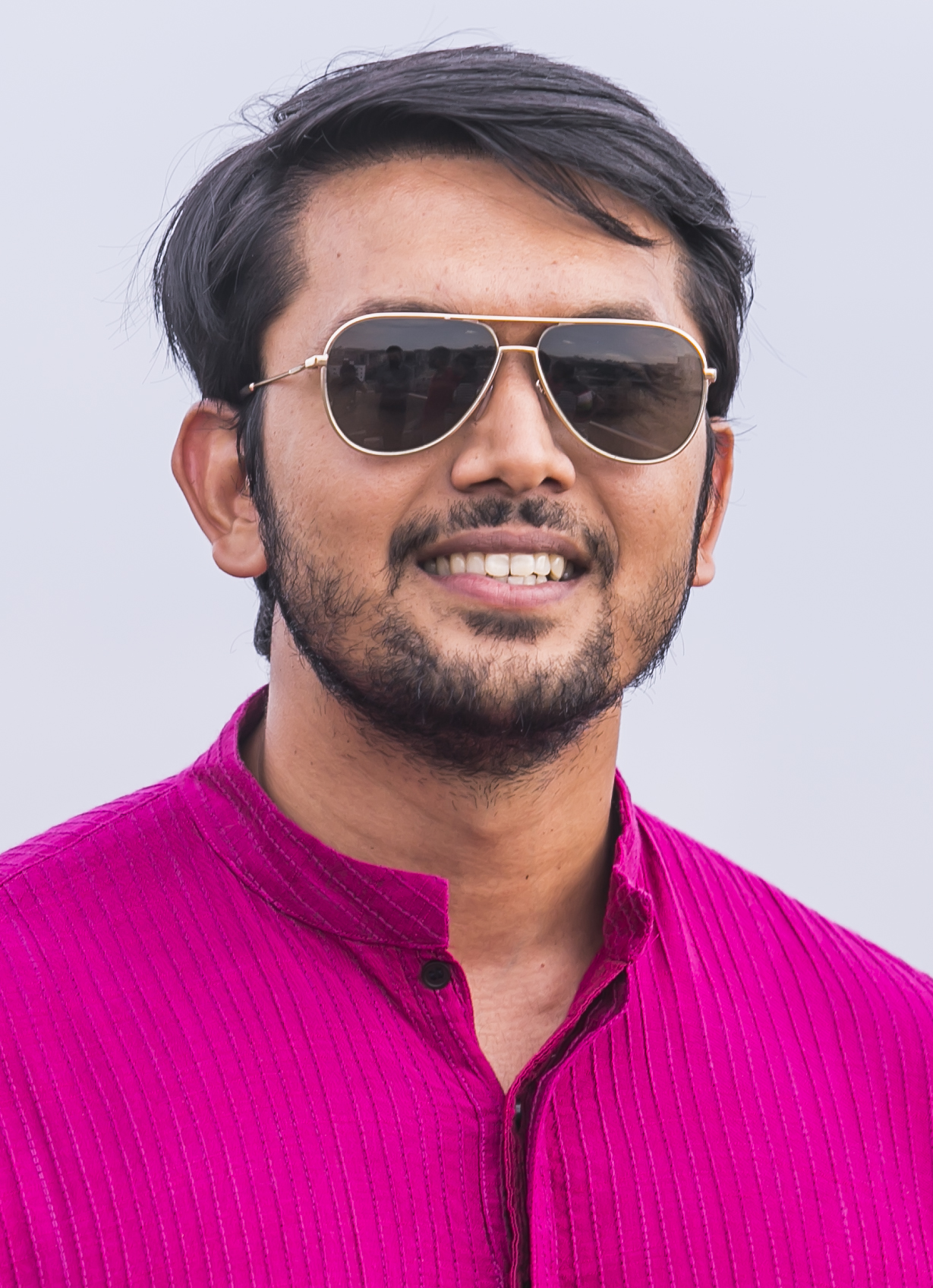
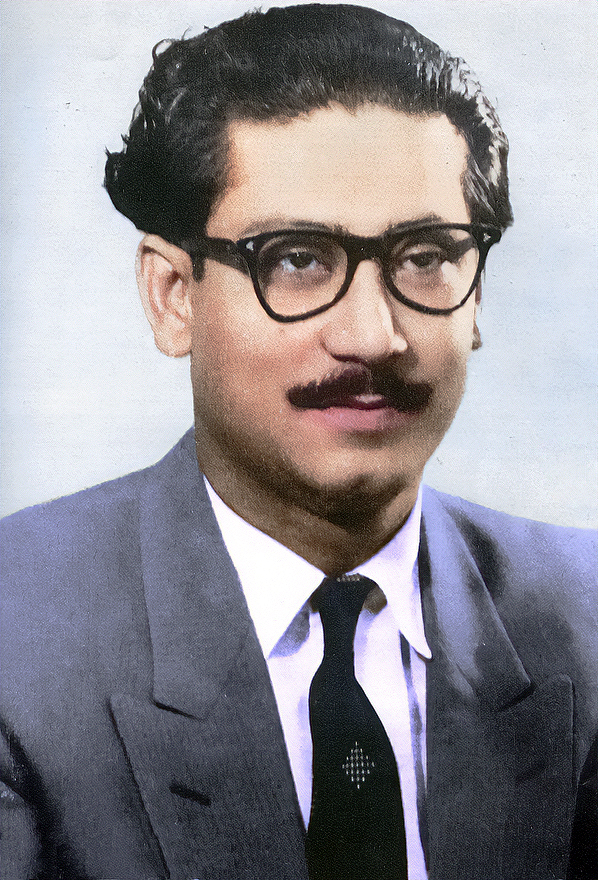
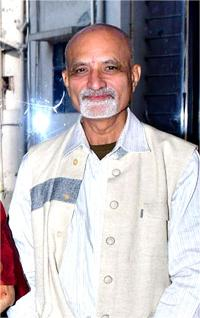
Arifin Shuvoo (top left) portrays Sheikh Mujibur Rahman (top right) and Deepak Antani (bottom left) portrays Mahatma Gandhi (bottom right)

Shyam Benegal ensured that most of the performers in the film were from Bangladesh. (Note: It was for linguistic reason. India and Bangladesh has different Bengali dialects that are historically important.) Auditions were held in Bangladesh and India (Note: In Dhaka (Television Building), Kolkata and Mumbai.) from January to February 2020 for the casting of the film. Apart from various performers, Soumya Jyoti, Tariq Anam Khan, Shamima Nazneen, Masuma Rahman Nabila, Jaya Ahsan and Kaushik Sen were also present at the auditions. According to a report in the Bangla Tribune on 7 February 2020, Dilara Zaman has been finalized as the cast of the film in January. Besides, the names of Fazlur Rahman Babu and Tauquir Ahmed have also been finalized, says the report. A draft list of castings for the film contain 50 actors was made on 4 March 2020. (Note: Some of their names with role are given in Cast.) According to a report by Bangla Tribune, Sheikh Hasina's wishes would prevail in selecting actor for the lead role in the film. Her choice for the role was Amitabh Bachchan. But in the pre-production, she could not prefer him because Bachchan was older in that time. The director said that he was looking for a slim actor for the main character Sheikh Mujibur Rahman because he was not fat in his early life. During the auditions, a TV drama starring Arifin Shuvoo was being screened at the Mumbai International Film Festival. One of the film's screenwriter Shama Zaidi, who was present at the film festival, contacted him after watching the TV drama and requested to meet the director. Although some members of the production team considered Shuvoo unsuitable for the lead role, the director allowed him to audition. He was one of the 15 actors selected for the role of Bangabandhu who was finalized after 5 rounds of auditions. In an interview, the director explained why Arifin Shuvo was cast as the main character, saying that he was the perfect person for the role. Although it was decided to cast Jyotika Jyoti and Jannatul Sumaiya Himi as Sheikh Fazilatunnesa Mujib and Sheikh Hasina in the qualifying round, they were later dropped. Rawnak Hasan was selected for acting as Sheikh Kamal and was later dropped in the day of his contract signing day because the director thought that he was not perfect for the role. He was replaced by Somnath Chatterjee in December 2020. Although Ferdous Ahmed was finalised for Tajuddin Ahmad's role, Riaz Ahmed was later hired to play the role for visa related issue. (Note: During the 2019 Indian general election, Ahmed visited West Bengal, India and joined an election campaign. That was against the law of the country and that was the reason for visa related issue.) The production team was supposed to sign the contract with the selected actors in March 2021, but due to the inability to start shooting, it was decided in September. After the first round of casting, the second round of casting is done online due to the COVID-19 pandemic. In the next step, casting director Baharuddin Khelon selected 60 people for acting and sent their names to the director. Benegal finalized their names from the list after discussion. Irfan Sajjad was finalized for the role of Moazzem Hossain on 17 November 2021. Then on 22 November, Zayed Khan signed the contract for the role of Tikka Khan.

=== Costume ===
In December 2019, the production team reached out to costume designers in Bangladesh as well as clothing stores in the country to get an idea of the costumes. The costume designer of the film is Pia Benegal. The costumes for the film have been made in multiple costume factory in Mumbai Film City. For the film, research has been done on Sheikh Mujibur Rahman's costume and especially Mujib coat. According to Pia Benegal, the idea of Mujib coat as a costume was extraordinary and convenient, the collar of which could be easily changed.

=== Filming ===
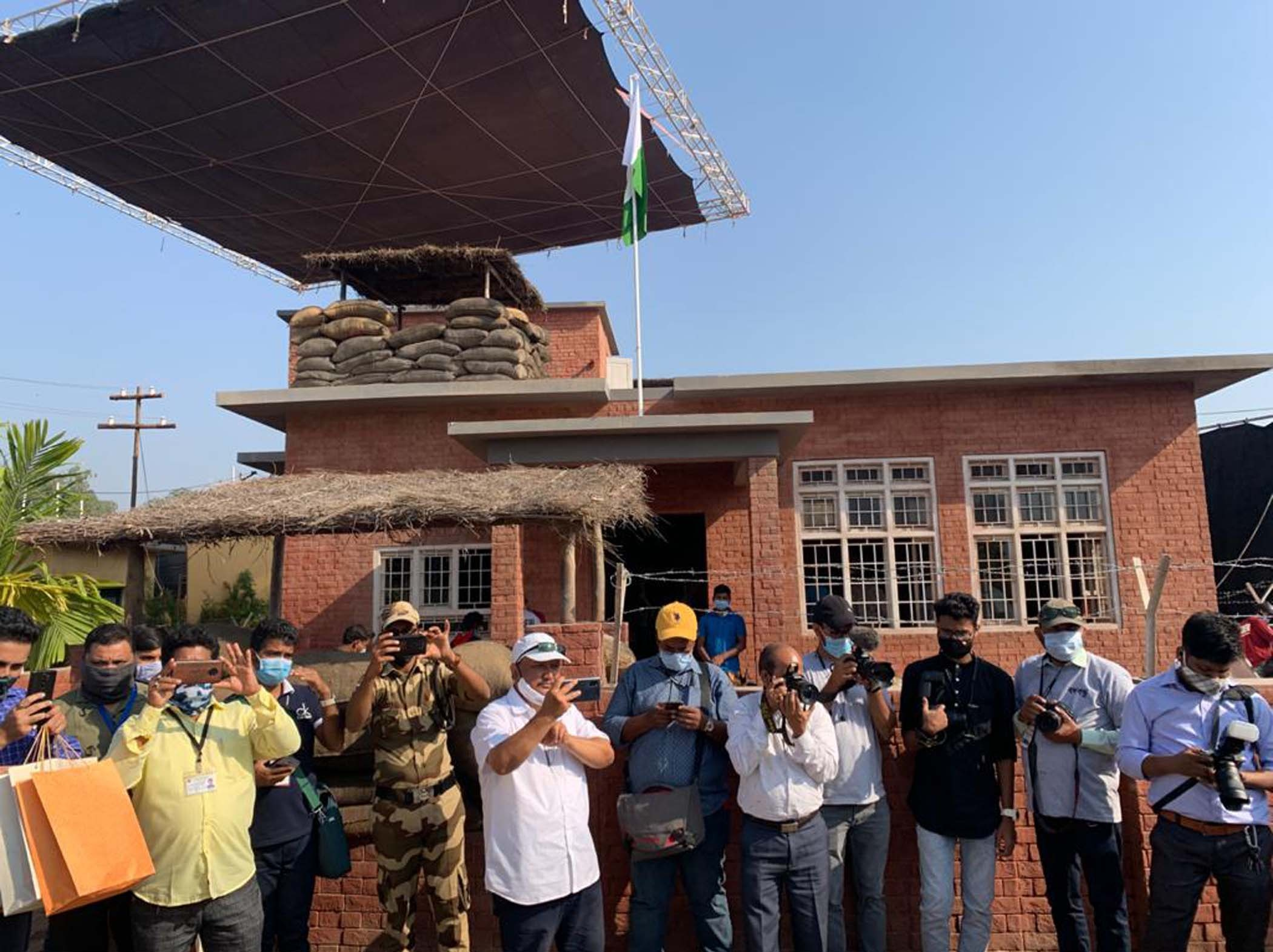
Crews on set at Film City, Mumbai

The shooting of the film was originally scheduled to start before 2018 Bangladeshi general election. Then the date was shifted to November 2019. On 7 May 2019, the director stated his team's desire to complete its filming in 80 days. Later the date was changed to 18 March 2020, but suspended. As per the initial plan, indoor shooting of the film was to be done in Kolkata and outdoor shooting in Bangladesh. The film's shooting started with muhurat shot under the working title Bangabandhu: The Making of a Nation on 21 January 2021, in India. (Note: In Mumbai, Delhi and Kolkata.) The first phase of the shooting was planned to be completed in the country within 100 days and it was completed on 4 April 2021. It was informed that the scenes of the liberation war would be shot in the second phase. The shooting of the film had to be postponed many times due to the COVID-19 lockdown in India and Cyclone Tauktae and Yaas. From 20 November, several scenes of the film were shot in many places of Bangladesh as well. (Note: The places are Dhaka, Gazipur District and Gopalganj District.) The shooting for 7 March Speech of Bangabandhu scenes took place on 23 November 2021 at the football field of Dhaka College. On 4 December 2021, a scene of the Bengali language movement was captured at Madhur Canteen. The shooting of the second phase ended after 59 days. As of April 2022, it was known that a total of 960 minutes were recorded as draft footage. According to a report of Samakal on 11 September 2022, the production team was thinking of re-shooting some scenes.

=== Editing and visual effects ===
In March 2022, it was reported by Prothom Alo that post-production of the film had already begun. It was planned to do the post-production in Mumbai. Benegal stated that post-production is likely to be completed by June, 2022. The editing of the film was supervised by a team from Bangladeshi government. However, due to the trailer controversy in May 2022, the production team started re-editing the footages of the film. Bangladeshi film experts will be consulted after editing the film on the advice of the supervising team. If they do not object, the film will be released only after showing it to Sheikh Hasina. According to a report of Samakal on 11 September 2022, Makuta VFX was appointed for visual effects of the film. On 12 September 2022, Hasan Mahmud stated that the film was ready for release.

== Soundtrack ==
In 2021, the production team contacted Zahid Akbar to compose one of the song for the film. The song was named Ochin Majhi (lit. 'The mysterious boatman') whose composer and singer was Shantanu Moitra, the music director of the film. It is the first music sang by him for any film. The director asked music director Moitra to refrain from putting pressure on himself while working. While working on the film's music, he wanted to incorporate Bangladeshi folk music influences. He had to watch the film half a hundred times for inspiration while producing the background music.

== Release ==
=== Marketing ===
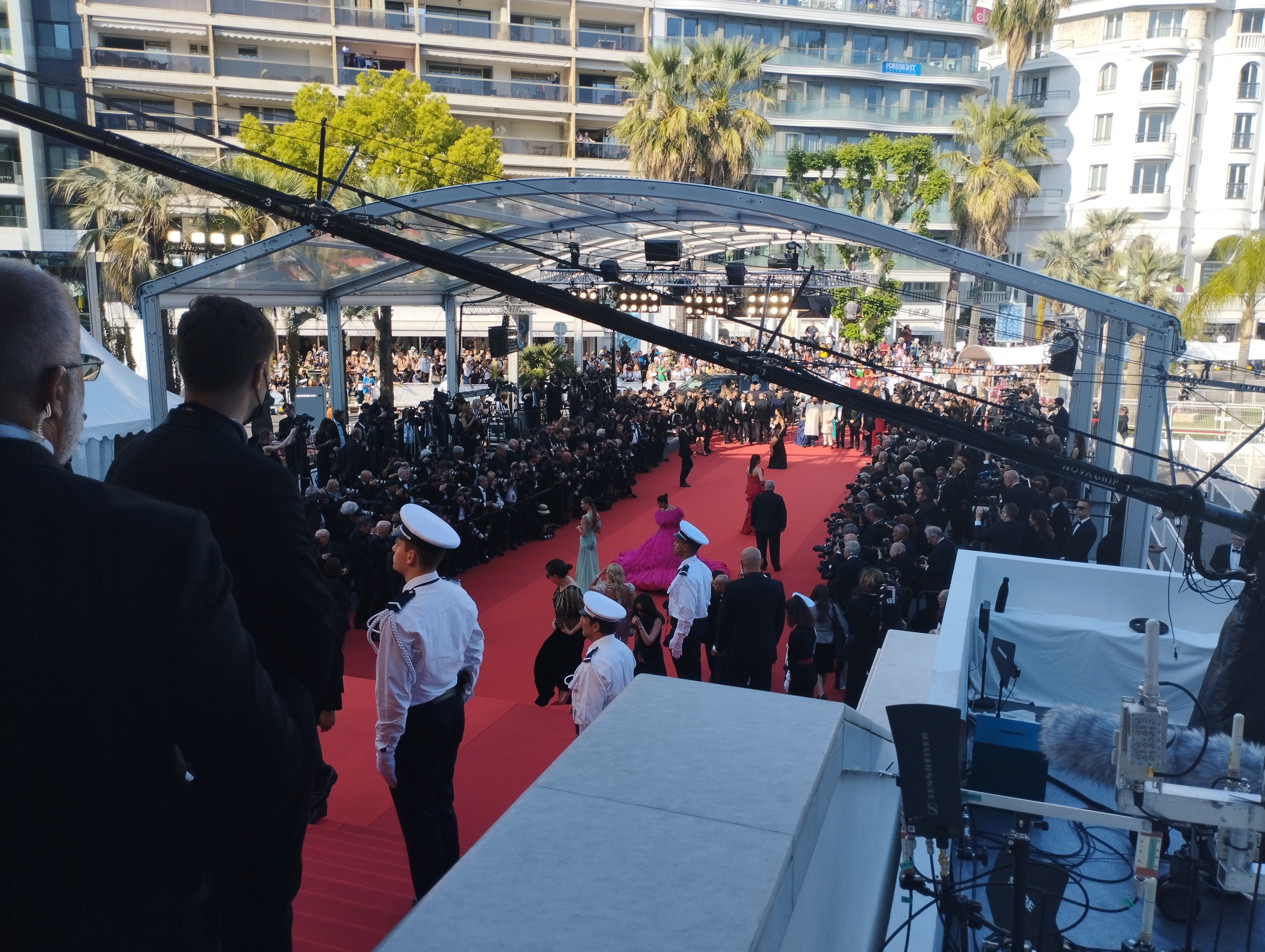
75th Cannes Film Festival

On 19 May 2022, the trailer for the film was shown at the pavilion reserved for India in Cannes Film Festival. Viewers in the pavilion praised the film. A week before the film's release in Bangladesh, the music video of its only original song was released on YouTube. The audience appreciated the song. A folk song used in the film was then uploaded online. Its lead actor Arifin Shuvoo visited Gulshan on 9 October 2023 to promote the film. At the same time, the film continued to be promoted in India before its release.

=== Theatrical release ===
This Bengali film was planned to be dubbed in English and Hindi. Its original release date was 17 March 2020. Then keeping the day and month fixed, the year of its release is set back by 1 year and 2 years respectively, but was later postponed. On May 3, 2022, it was forecasted by National Film Development Corporation of India that the film would be released in September of the same year, but postponed due to the trailer controversy.

In September 6, during Sheikh Hasina's four-day state visit to India, Arindam Bagchi, the spokesperson of Indian Ministry of External Affairs, said that the film's release date has not been set but he expects it to be released by the end of 2022. On 31 July 2023, Bangladesh Film Censor Board gave uncut censor certificate to the film. On 13 September 2023, the film was screened at the 48th Toronto International Film Festival in Canada. On 20 September 2023, the Ministry of Information and Broadcasting of Bangladesh said that the government is planning to release the film in the month of October in Bangladesh.

On 30 September 2023, it was confirmed from the National Film Development Corporation of India that it will release in India on 27 October 2023. On the first day of October, it was known that the film will release in Bangladesh in 13th of the same month. Jaaz Multimedia became the nationwide distributor of the film and revealed that it will be released in 153 cinemas in the country. The film premiered on 12 October 2023 at the Bangladesh Film Archive. The next day the film was released in the movie theaters of Bangladesh. In 16 October, the number of movie theaters showing the film increased to 161. As of 20 October 2023, the film was showing in 164 movie theaters in Bangladesh.

== Reception ==
=== Audiences ===
97% movie theaters in Bangladesh were house full on the first day of the film's release. According to a report published by The Business Post, the audience feedback about the film at Star Cineplex on the first day of its release was positive. According to a news article of Kaler Kantho published on 15 October 2023, movie theaters in urban Dhaka were satisfied with the audience numbers of the film, but Lion Cinemas showed the opposite. In addition to the city, the film also received great interest from the audience in the rural areas of Bangladesh. According to the report of Dhaka Times, most of the movie theaters were houseful on the first two days of the film's release and the next three days saw a fair number of viewers.

=== Critical reception ===
According to film personalities and critics, the film has some flaws and shortcomings but they praised the film. According to Rajib Kanti Roy of Daily Sun, it is a film worth watching, if not extraordinary. He praised its screenplay, background music, soundtracks and actors' performances, but criticized the VFX and make-up used for the actors. According to him, the film uses some historical footage that make it an incomplete feature film. According to him, Nusrat Faria and Riaz have failed to portray the characters of Sheikh Hasina and Tajuddin Ahmed. He also called the child actor who played the role of Sheikh Russel unsuitable for the role. A legal notice was also sent to the court by the Bangladesh Nationalist Party's Legal Affairs Secretary, demanding the removal of two scenes that allegedly defamed its founder, former president Ziaur Rahman, through historically inaccurate information.

=== Box office ===
The film received positive at box office on its opening in Bangladesh, becoming one of the highest grossing film in the country. Bangladesh Film Development Corporation sources reported a gross of approximately ৳19.1 million during its first phase of domestic release. In the month of its release, the film grossed ৳1,678,099 in the United Kingdom and United Arab Emirates, and ৳2,279,726 in Australia.

=== Accolades ===
Award	Category	Nominee(s)	Result	Ref.
Meril-Prothom Alo Awards	Best Actor	Arifin Shuvoo	Nominated	
Meril-Prothom Alo Awards	Best Actor	Chanchal Chowdhury	Nominated	
Meril-Prothom Alo Awards	Best Actress	Nusraat Faria	Nominated	
Dhaka International Film Festival Awards	Best Film	Mujib: The Making of a Nation	Won	
International Cultural Expo & Festival Awards	Best Activities	Bangladesh	Won	

== Legacy ==
There was a lot of interest among Bangladeshis to know who will play the main character in the film. Some people proposed Amitabh Bachchan, Nawazuddin Siddiqui, Boman Irani, Adil Hussain, Prosenjit Chatterjee, Pijush Bandyopadhyay and Tariq Anam Khan as main character. Some netizens edited the pictures of many actors and made their mustaches and hair look exactly like Bangabandhu and posted them on social media.

Shyam Benegal said that he was happy to direct the film and praised Bangabandhu who was a friend of India. Commenting on the film, Bangabandhu's daughter, Prime Minister Sheikh Hasina, was optimistic about the film. Directed by Shyam Benegal, the film will be accepted as a milestone in the Bangladeshi cinema history, she said positively.

After watching the film, Bidisha Ershad praised it and expressed her interest in producing a film on the biography of her husband, former President of Bangladesh Hossain Mohammad Ershad.

=== Director ===
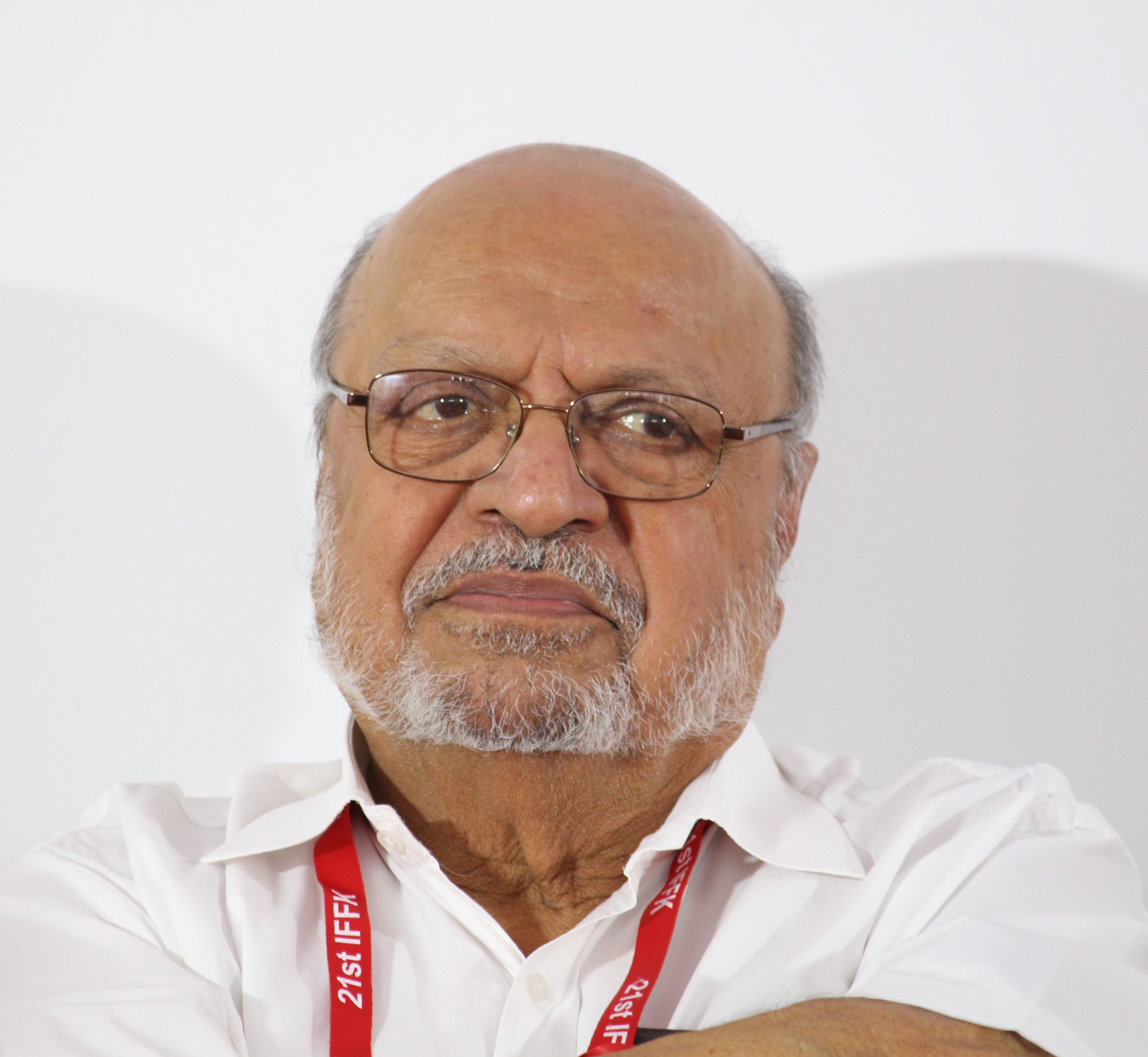
Shyam Benegal, one of three Indian directors proposed to film committee.

Though it was decided to make a film about Bangabandhu, the news of proposing the names of three Indian directors as the director of the film made many Bangladeshis unhappy. Some famous film related figures of Bangladesh criticized it. Among the critics were Gias Uddin Selim, Farooque, Mahmud Didar and Khijir Hayat Khan. Nasiruddin Yousuff thinks that it would have been better if the director of the film was Bangladeshi. Abul Hayat and Toukir Ahmed were positive in this regard. However, Shyam Benegal pointed out that the biopic of Mahatma Gandhi, the father of the Indian nation, was made by a foreigner. On the other hand, Kaushik Ganguly thinks it is a simple matter because Bangabandhu is like Kazi Nazrul Islam who is the wealth of both India and Bangladesh. (Note: Kazi Nazrul Islam is the national poet of Bangladesh who was born in India, a neighboring country of Bangladesh.) According to Syed Borhan Kabir, Benegal was a talented director in his early life but it is not possible for him to give any good films in this era.

=== Casting ===
Although Jannatul Sumaiya Heme's name was on the list published by BFDC, the director did not include her name on his own list. She complained that her name should not have been excluded without informing. However, Mohammad Hossain Jaimy, the line producer of the film, claimed that he did not call her because Heme's name was not in the final list given to him. Jyotika Jyoti complained on social media that although she was selected for acting twice, she was dropped due to corruption in the Bangladesh part of the production team. Jyotika Jyoti also said that when he contacted Shyam Benegal to find out why he was dropped, he informed her that since he was told that she was busy with other work, he dropped her. After the release of the trailer of the film, Shuvoo received negative response. The trailer captured his weak performance which the people of Bangladesh could not accept. As a reaction of Shuvoo's excuse for the trailer, Sohana Saba trolled him on Facebook about his performance. Columnist Deepak Chowdhury criticised the casting of Shuvoo and Tisha in the film. Columnist Syed Borhan Kabir criticized casting process of the film. In particular, he criticised Arifin Shuvoo and considered him to be only suitable for acting in romantic films.

=== First trailer ===
External videos
- First trailer video for Mujib: The Making of a Nation
- Mujib - The Making of a Nation

After the upload of the film's first trailer, it got mixed reaction among the people. The trailer was criticised for many issues. Hashibur Reza Kallol, a filmmaker, criticised the trailer. But Kingshuk Chaterjee, a history professor from the University of Calcutta, hinted that it is normal because even Gandhi and Jinnah could not escape criticism. Contrary to criticism of the trailer, director Shyam Benegal said that it is inappropriate to react only by watching the trailer without watching the entire film. Sohanur Rahman Sohan supported him. A section of viewers complained that there were many historical mistakes in the trailer. Scriptwriter Sadhana Ahmed refuted the allegations and told The Daily Star that there was no danger of a historical mistake in the film. Columnist Deepak Chowdhury thinks that if people watch this trailer, they may lose interest in watching the film. Bahauddin Khelon, one of the casting directors of the film, agreed that the trailer has some problem.

When people in Bangladesh criticized the trailer of Mujib, Arifin Shuvoo said that the trailer is not official. However, the country's Information Minister Hasan Mahmud denied it on May 25 and confirmed about its officiality. The director said in an interview on May 26 that the trailer was made before the film's production was completed and another trailer will be released later. He also wanted to make it clear that he is more interested in calling it a teaser than a movie trailer. He also indirectly acknowledged the flaws in the trailer.

=== Politics ===
Jawad Antu of Somoy TV thinks that since Sheikh Mujibur Rahman is the idol of Bangladesh Awami League, a group of people in Bangladesh have unreasonably criticized its trailer, thinking it is a propaganda film of the political party. The day before the film's release in Bangladesh, the Bangladesh Chhatra League announced that it would take over the promotion of the film in the country. A screening of the film was organized by Bangladesh Chhatra League on 19 October 2023 at Jagannath University in the presence of Md. Imdadul Hoque, vice chancellor of the university. A public screening of the film was organized at government auditorium in Barura Upazila, Comilla district for a day at the initiative of Bangladesh Awami League on 20 October 2023. Another public screening of the film was organized at Modhuban Cineplex in Bogra district for a week at the party initiative from the same day. According to Deep Halder of ThePrint, Sheikh Hasina released the hastily produced film to impress the citizens for the 2024 Bangladeshi general election which would not actually help her in politics.

=== Historicity ===
Film personality Mir Shamsul Alam Babu pointed that while the second trailer showed the present Arts faculty building of Dhaka University, it was in the area of Dhaka Medical College Hospital in 1947. He found discrepancies between the scenes of Sheikh Mujibur Rahman's return to his homeland in 1972 shown in the film with the historical account. Although Bangabandhu's residence had only two rooms in 1961, the trailer shows Mujib's family entering the entire two-story building. In the trailer, the scene of students being shot in front of Dhaka University's arts faculty during the Bengali language movement on 21 February 1952, but according to history, the shooting did not happen then, but happened hours later.

== See also ==
- List of artistic depictions of Sheikh Mujibur Rahman
- Artistic depictions of the Bengali Language Movement
- Artistic depictions of the Bangladesh Liberation War
- List of artistic depictions of Mahatma Gandhi
- Cinema of Bangladesh
- Indo-Bangladesh joint production
- List of historical films set in Asia
- Shyam Benegal filmography
