= Artistic depictions of the Bengali Language Movement =

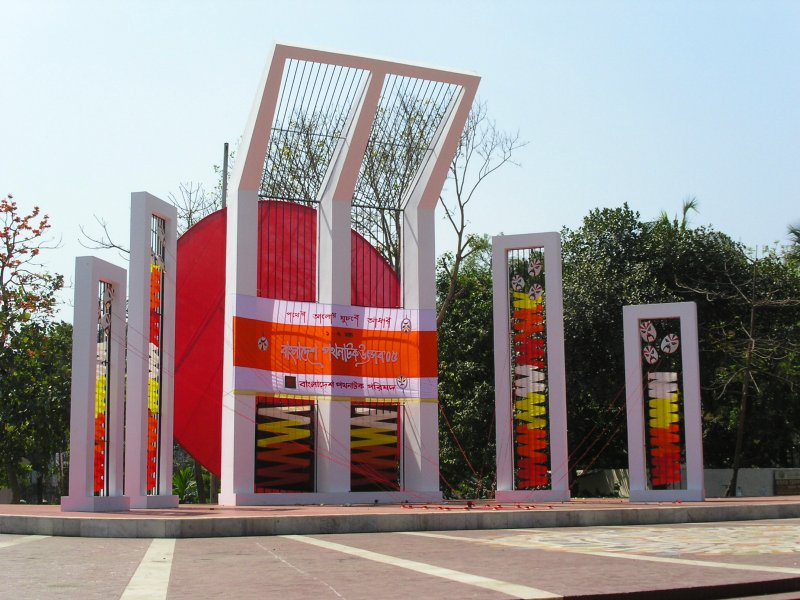
Shaheed Minar, or the Martyr's monument, located near Dhaka Medical College, commemorates the struggle for Bengali language

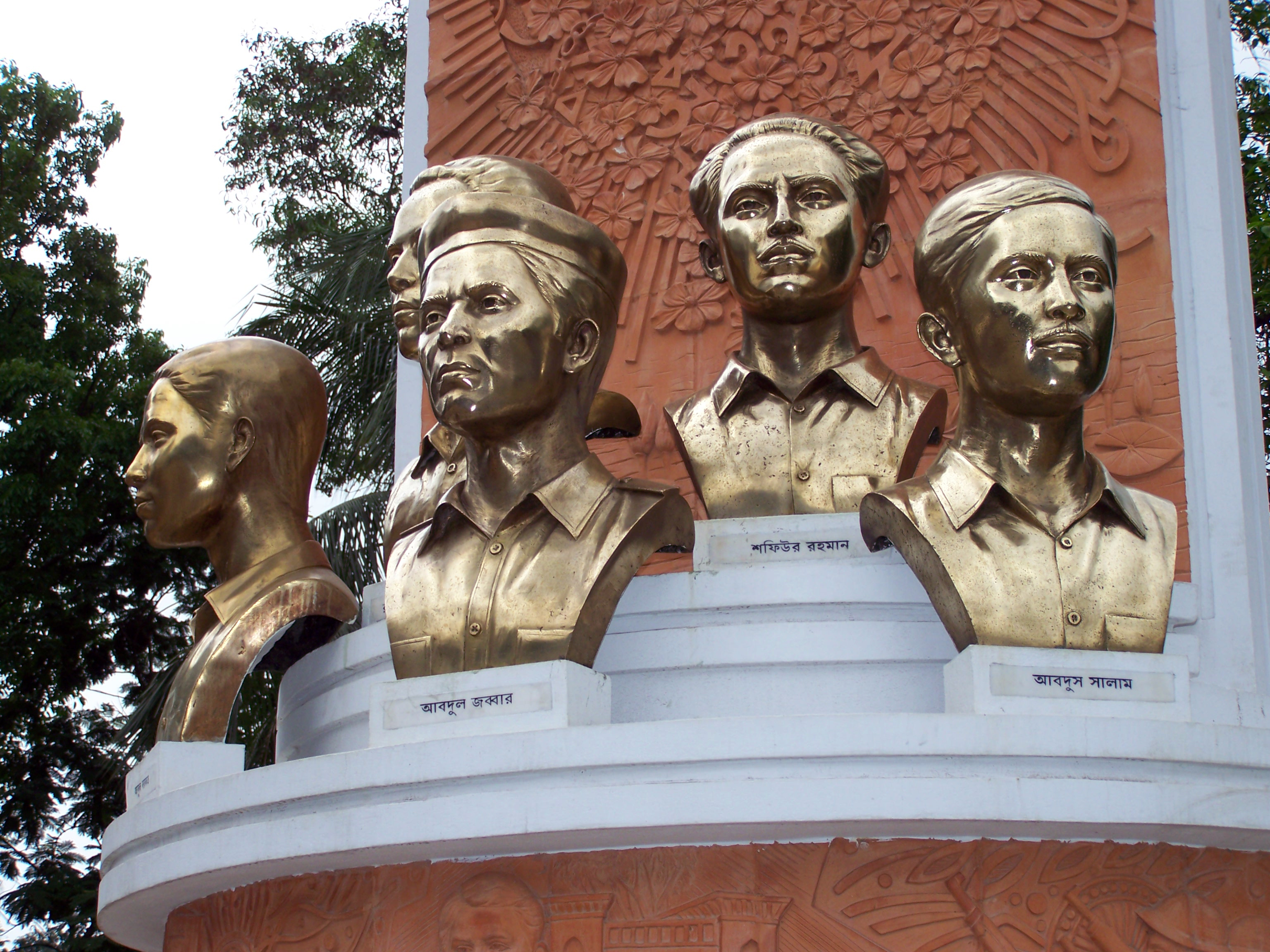
Moder Gorob, a commemorative sculpture at Bangla Academy

The Bengali language movement was a political effort in East Pakistan (now Bangladesh) that advocated the adoption of Bengali as an official language. The movement faced violent opposition by the government before finally succeeding. Numerous songs, poems, novels and plays were written to commemorate the movement, as well as films and memoirs.

== Songs ==
- Ekusher Gaan (The Song of Twentyfirst) by Abdul Gaffar Choudhury
- Ora Amar Mukher Kotha (They are my Words) by Abdul Latif
- Ekushey February (21 February) by Kabir Suman

== Poems ==
- Kadte Ashini Fashir Dabi Niye Ashechi (I have not come to mourn but to appeal for hanging) by Mahbub Ul Alam Choudhury
- Bornomala, Amar Dukhini Bornomala by Shamsur Rahman
- February 1969 by Shamsur Rahman
- Amake ki malyo debe dao by Nirmalendu Goon
- Chithi by Abu Zafar Obaidullah
- Shobhyotar Monibondhe by Syed Shamsul Haque

== Sculpture and architecture ==
- Shaheed Minar ( "Martyr Monument") in Dhaka, Bangladesh.
- Moder Gorob (Our Pride ) – is a sculpture situated in front of Bangla Academy building in Dhaka, Bangladesh.
- Bhasha Smritistambha (Language Monument) – located at Deshapriya Park, Kolkata, India.
- Bhasha Shahid Smarak (Language Martyrs Memorial) – at Ekushe Udyan park, Kolkata, India.

== Novels ==
- Ekushey February by Zahir Raihan
- Artonaad by Shawkat Osman
- Nirontor Ghontadhoni by Selina Hossain

== Films ==
- Jibon Theke Neya (Taken from Life) directed by Zahir Raihan
- Bangla directed by Shahidul Islam Khokon
- Fagun Haway (In Spring breeze) directed by Tauquir Ahmed

== Stage play ==
- Kobor (Grave) by Munier Chowdhury

== Things named after the movement ==
- Ekushey Padak, the second highest civilian award in Bangladesh
- Ekushey Book Fair, the national book fair of Bangladesh
- Ekushey Television, the first private terrestrial TV channel in Bangladesh
- Ekushe Udyan, park in Kolkata, West Bengal, India
- Bhasha Udyan, part of Surendra Nath park in Kolkata, West Bengal

== See also ==
- Artistic depictions of Bangladesh Liberation War
- List of artistic depictions of Sheikh Mujibur Rahman
