= Shafiur Rahman =

Bengali language movement protester (1918–1952)

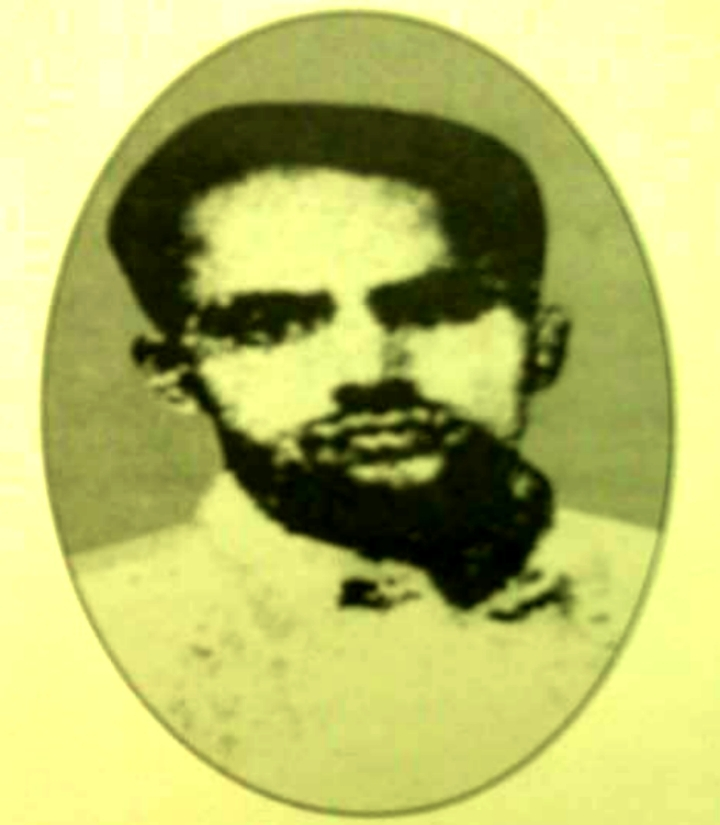
- Born: 24 January 1918; Serampore, Bengal Presidency, British India
- Died: 22 February 1952 (aged 34); Dacca, East Bengal, Pakistan
- Occupation: Clerk
- Known for: Language Martyr of 1952

Shafiur Rahman (Bengali: শফিউর রহমান; 24 January 1918 – 22 February 1952) is considered in Bangladesh to be a martyr of the language movement which took place in the former East Pakistan.

== Early life ==
Shafiur Rahman was born in Konnagar, near Serampore, in Bengal Presidency, British Raj. His father's name was Hakim Mahabubur Rahman and his mother's name was Kanayata Khatoon. He graduated from Konnagar High School in 1936 and completed his I. Com at Government Commerce College in Kolkata. After the partition of India he moved to Dhaka, East Bengal, taking a job as a clerk in the accounts section of the Dhaka High Court.

== Bengali Language Movement ==
On 22 February 1952 while commuting to his job on his bicycle he entered Nawabpur Road, which was full of protesters against police shootings the previous day at a language movement rally. Police fired at the protests and Shafiur Rahman was shot in the back; he died after being taken to Dhaka Medical College. He was buried in Azimpur graveyard under police guard.

== Legacy ==
Two days after the incident, the first Shaheed Minar was inaugurated by his father, Hakim Mahbubur Rahman, along with the protesting students of Dhaka University.

In 2000, Shafiur Rahman was awarded the Ekushey Padak by the government of Bangladesh. A bronze sculpture of his head with four other martyrs of the language movement is called Moder Gorob and located in Bangla Academy premises.

== Gallery ==
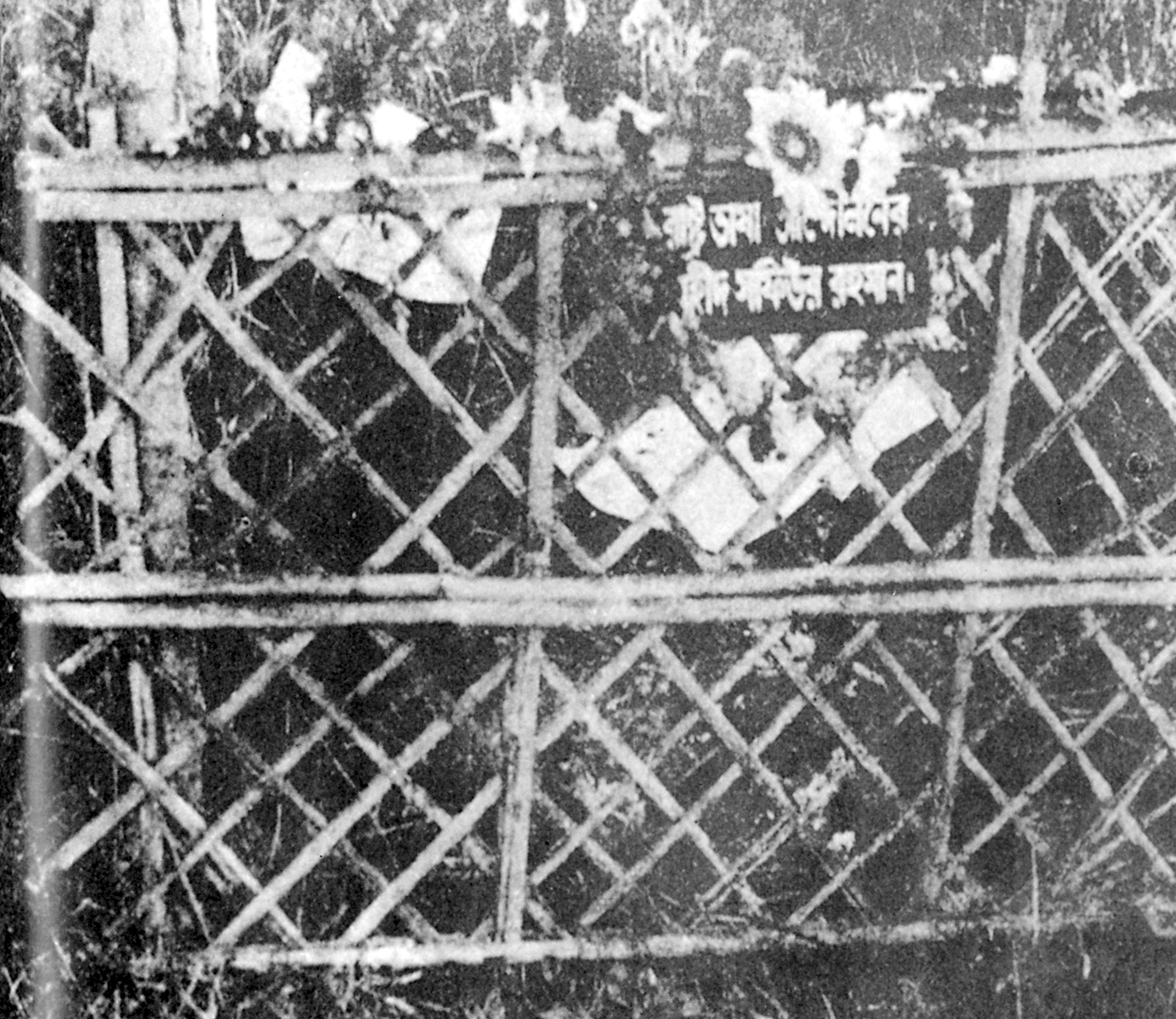
The grave of Shafiur Rahman

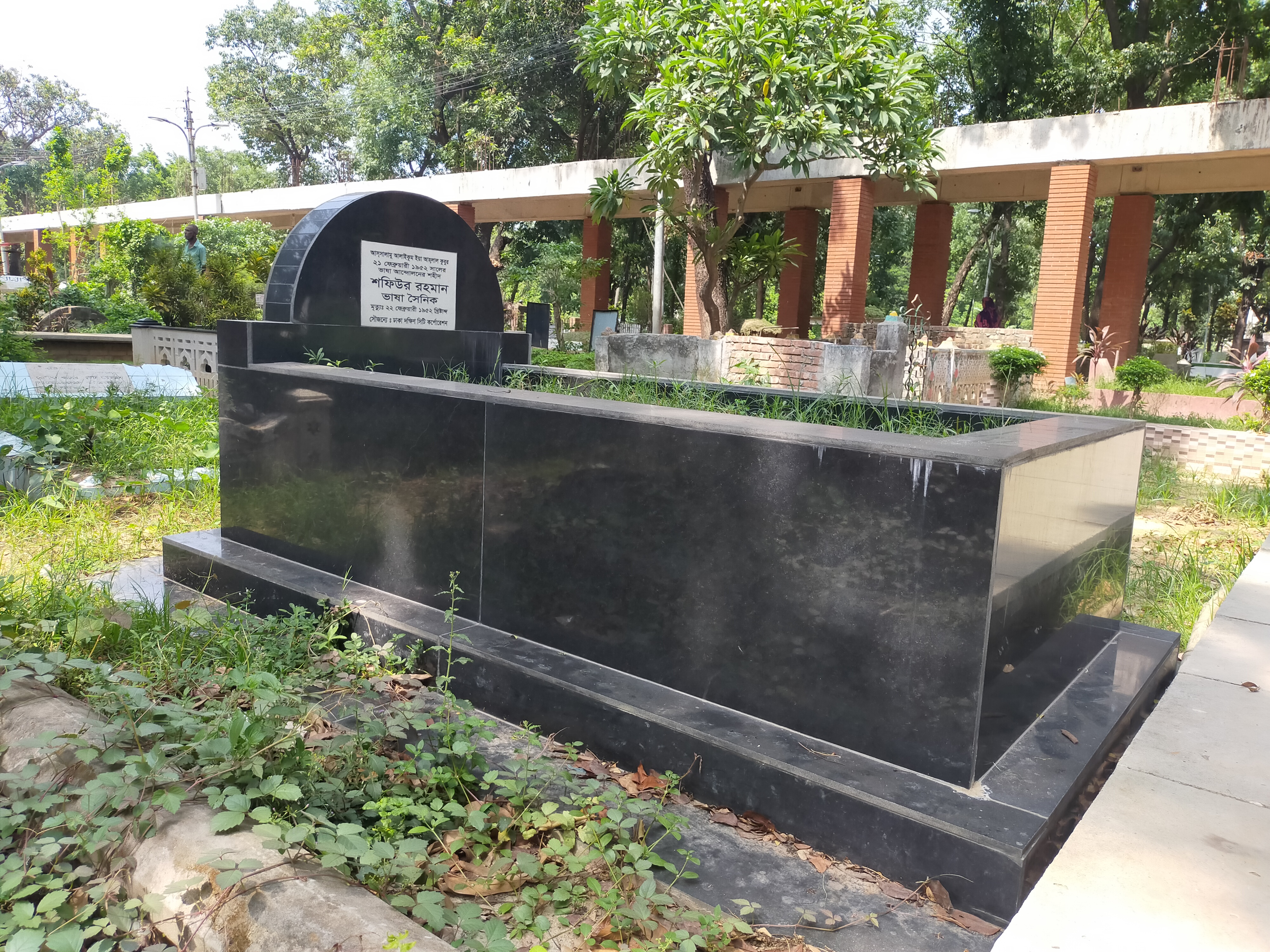
Grave of Shafiur Rahman at Azimpur graveyard, Dhaka

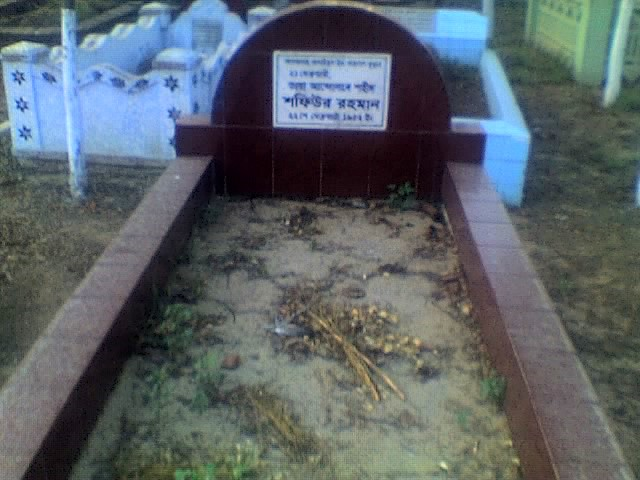
Grave of Shafiur Rahman in Azimpur Graveyard, Dhaka

Shafiur Rahman martyr memorial in Konnagar
