= Sadhana Ahmed =

Bangladeshi playwright and theatre artist

- সাধনা আহমেদ
- Born: Bharibe Bazar, Kishoreganj District, Bangladesh
- Education: National University
- Children: 1
- Awards: Bangla Academy Literary Award (2021)

Sadhana Ahmed is a Bangladeshi playwright, screenwriter, performing artist and a fellow of Bangla Academy in Bangladesh. She was awarded Bangla Academy Literary Award (2021) by the government of Bangladesh.

== Early life ==
Sadhana Ahmed was born in Kishoreganj District, Bangladesh. She currently lives in Dhaka.

== Theatre life ==
She has published four books with six plays. Among the plays, Maatbring (The Woodlanders) was performed in the 8th Theatre Olympics in 2018, and Saptaparnee (Seven leaves) was performed in Bharat Rang Mahotsav (BRM) in 2019. Another play, Damer Madar (Goddess of Breathes) has been selected to stage for 2022, arranged by the Delhi National School of Drama, India. One of the plays, Angshupot Upakkhan (Episode of Filament canvas) has been included in the syllabus of the Bangla literature department of Kazi Nazrul University in Asansol, West Bengal in India. Moreover, some students have started researching her plays for their master's degrees and Ph.D. thesis, at several universities in Bangladesh and West Bengal in India.

== Film and television ==
She worked as a dialogue writer, script supervisor, and dialogue coach for the film Mujib: The Making of a Nation, based on Bangabandhu Sheikh Mujibur Rahman’s life (biopic), the founding father of Bangladesh. Directed by Shyam Benegal from India.

== Award ==
Bangla Academy Literary Award (2021)
