= Bhasha Smritistambha =

Memorial in Kolkata, India

Bhasha Smritistambha (Language Monument)
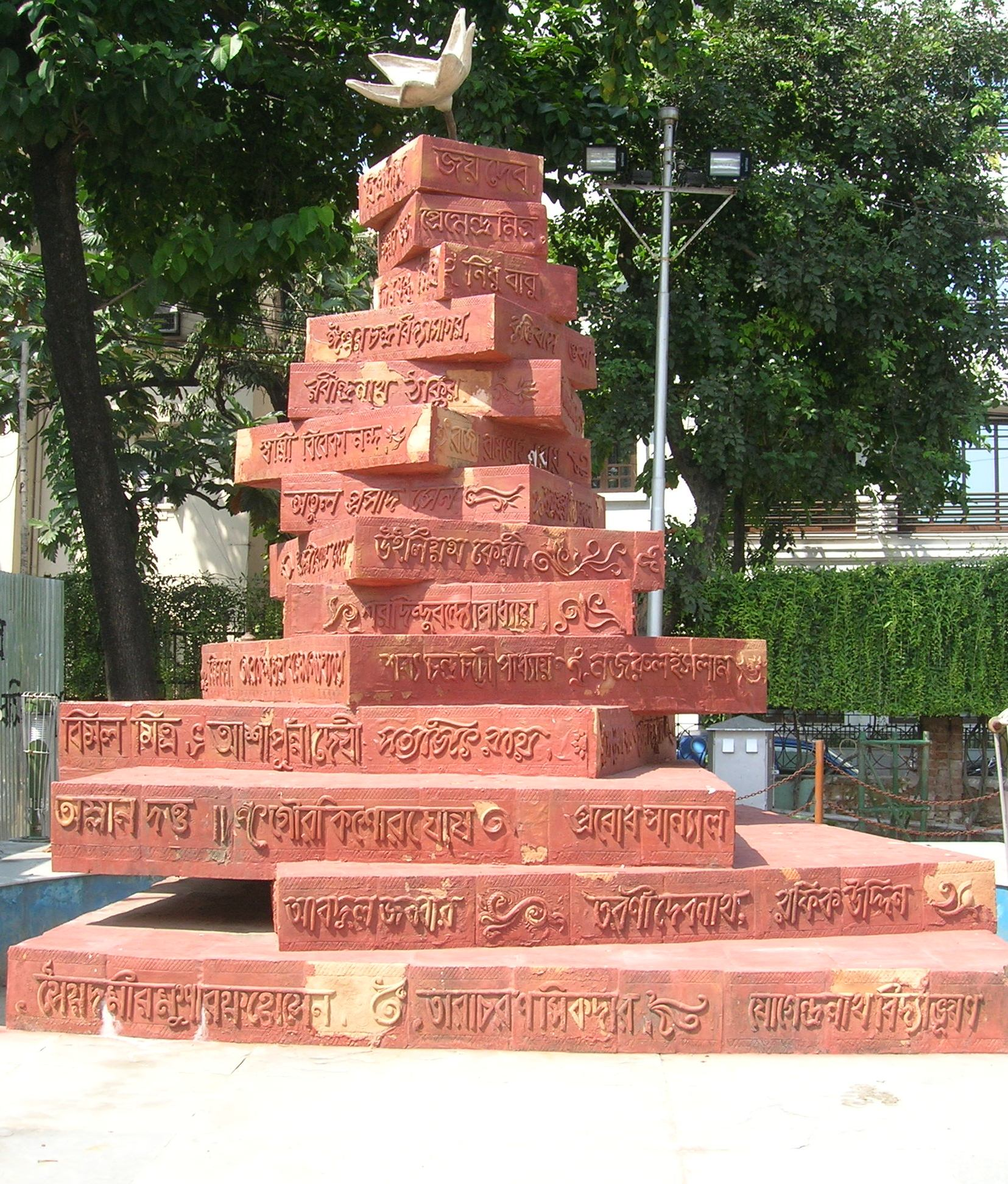
- Frontal view of Bhasha Smritistambha
- Location: Deshapriya Park, Kolkata, Paschimbanga (West Bengal), India,
- Designer: Subhaprasanna
- Type: Memorial
- Opening date: 20 February 2011
- Dedicated to: Bengali language authors and martyrs of Language Movements of Dhaka and Silchar.

The Bhasha Smritistambha, Language Monument), located at Deshapriya Park, Kolkata, is a memorial dedicated to the Bengali language authors and the martyrs of language movements of Dhaka and Silchar.

The monument was inaugurated by Mamata Banerjee, the then Railway Minister of India on 20 February 2011. Amala Shankar, Dwijen Mukherjee, singer Arati Mukherjee, Indrani Sen, Anup Ghoshal, Saikat Mitra, Nirmala Mishra and writer Sirshendu Mukherjee were present at the inauguration ceremony of the "Bhasa Smritistambha".

"Bhasha Smritistambha" is the second Bengali language Martyr's memorial in Kolkata after the "Bhasha Shahid Smarak", commissioned at Surendranath Park, Esplanade in 1998.
