= Moder Gorob =

Sculpture in Dhaka

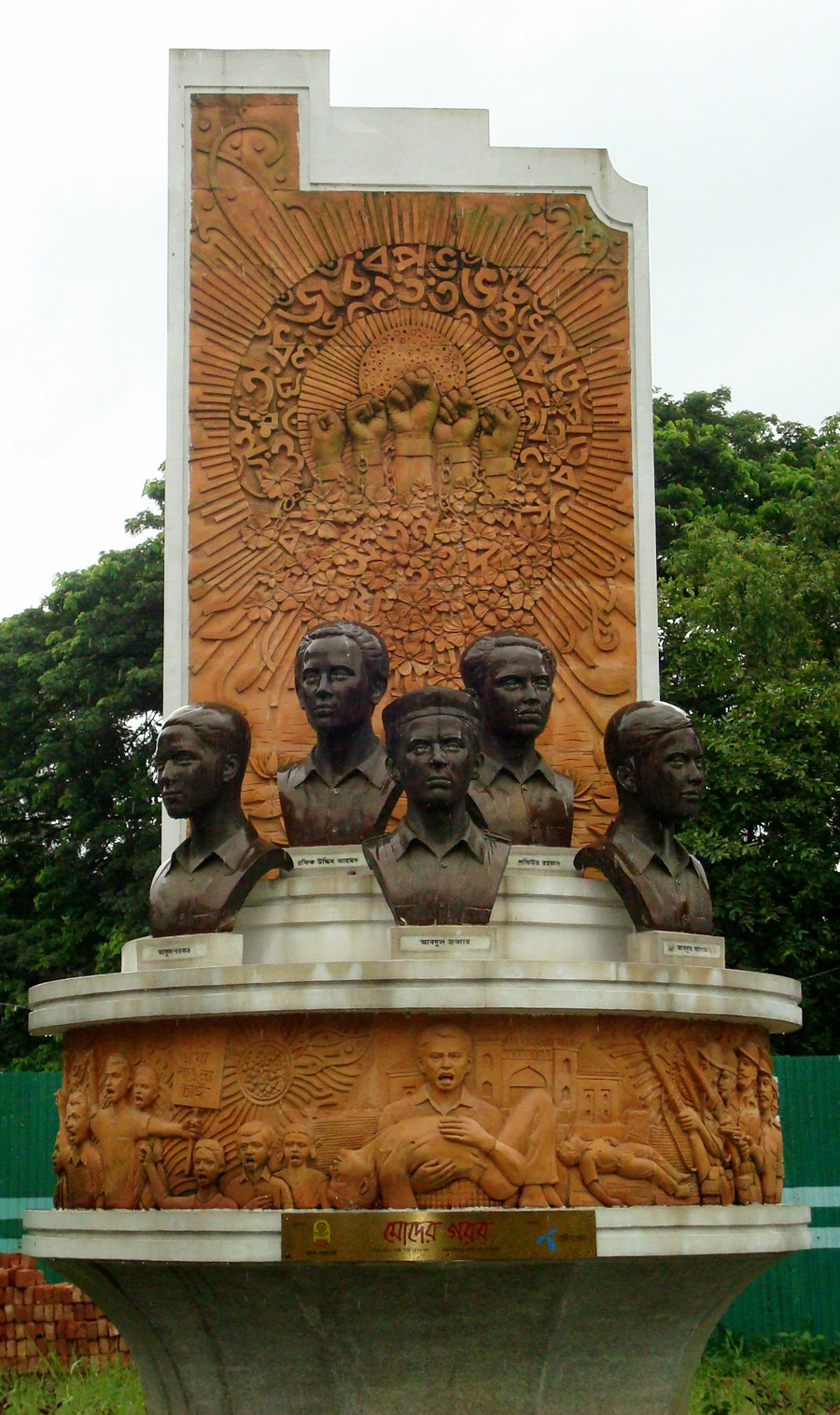
- Moder Gorob, sculpture in Bangla Academy
- Artist: Mofidul Alam Khan
- Year: 2007
- Medium: Bronze sculpture
- Subject: Bengali language movement
- Location: Dhaka
- 23°43′47.56″N 90°23′48.95″E

Moder Gorob is a sculpture situated in front of Bangla Academy building in Dhaka, Bangladesh. It was dedicated to the memory of those killed during the Bengali language movement demonstrations of 1952, when protesters demanding Bengali as a state language of former Dominion of Pakistan were massacred by Pakistan Police.

== Structure ==
There are five different metal sculptures of Abdus Salam, Rafiq Uddin Ahmed, Abdul Jabbar, Shafiur Rahman and Abul Barkat. These are situated on a base. In the rear part, there is a long wall rising. There are three steps on the upper part of the wall. Both sides of the wall and other brick-made parts are ornamented by frescoes of the Language movement of 1952.

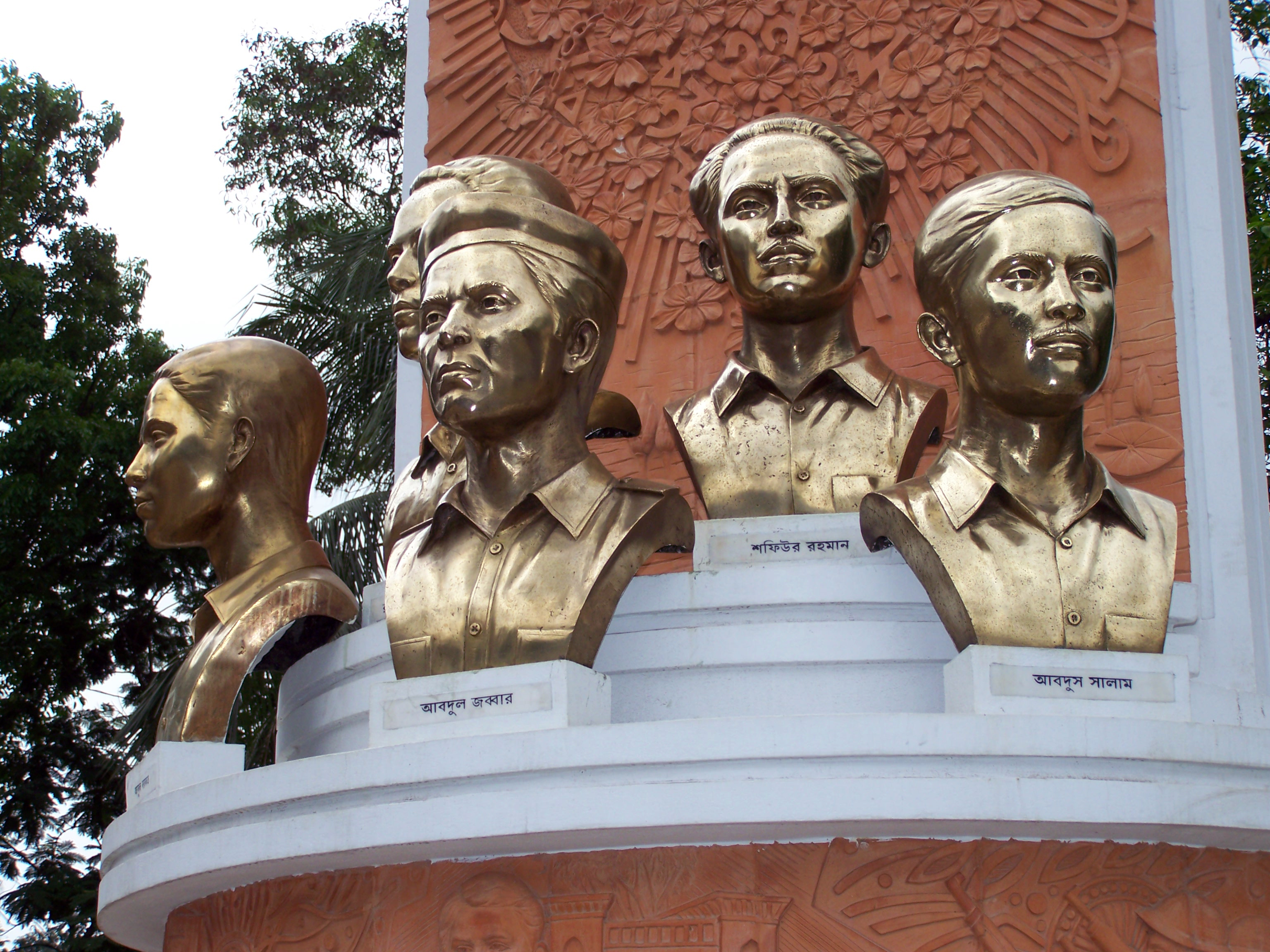
Close up view of Moder Gorob

== History ==
Moder Gorob was completed and installed at a cost of 1.3 million taka (equivalent to US$19,000 in 2007). Telecom company GrameenPhone donated 1 million taka, the remainder came from Bangla Academy funds. The sculpture was unveiled on 1 February 2007 by Fakhruddin Ahmed, Chief Adviser of the caretaker government, as part of the opening of the annual Ekushey Book Fair.

== Gallery ==
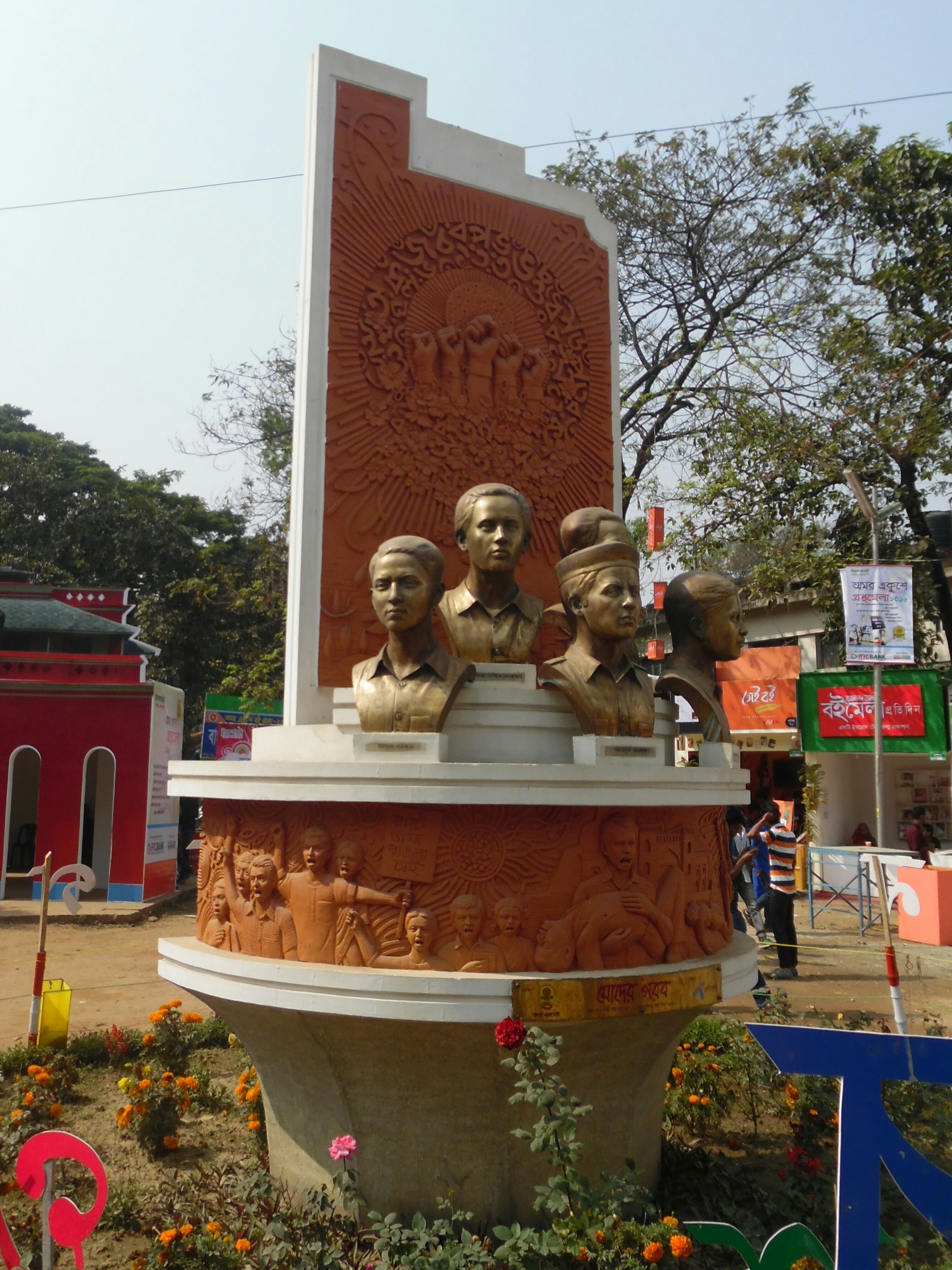
Moder Gorob, front view

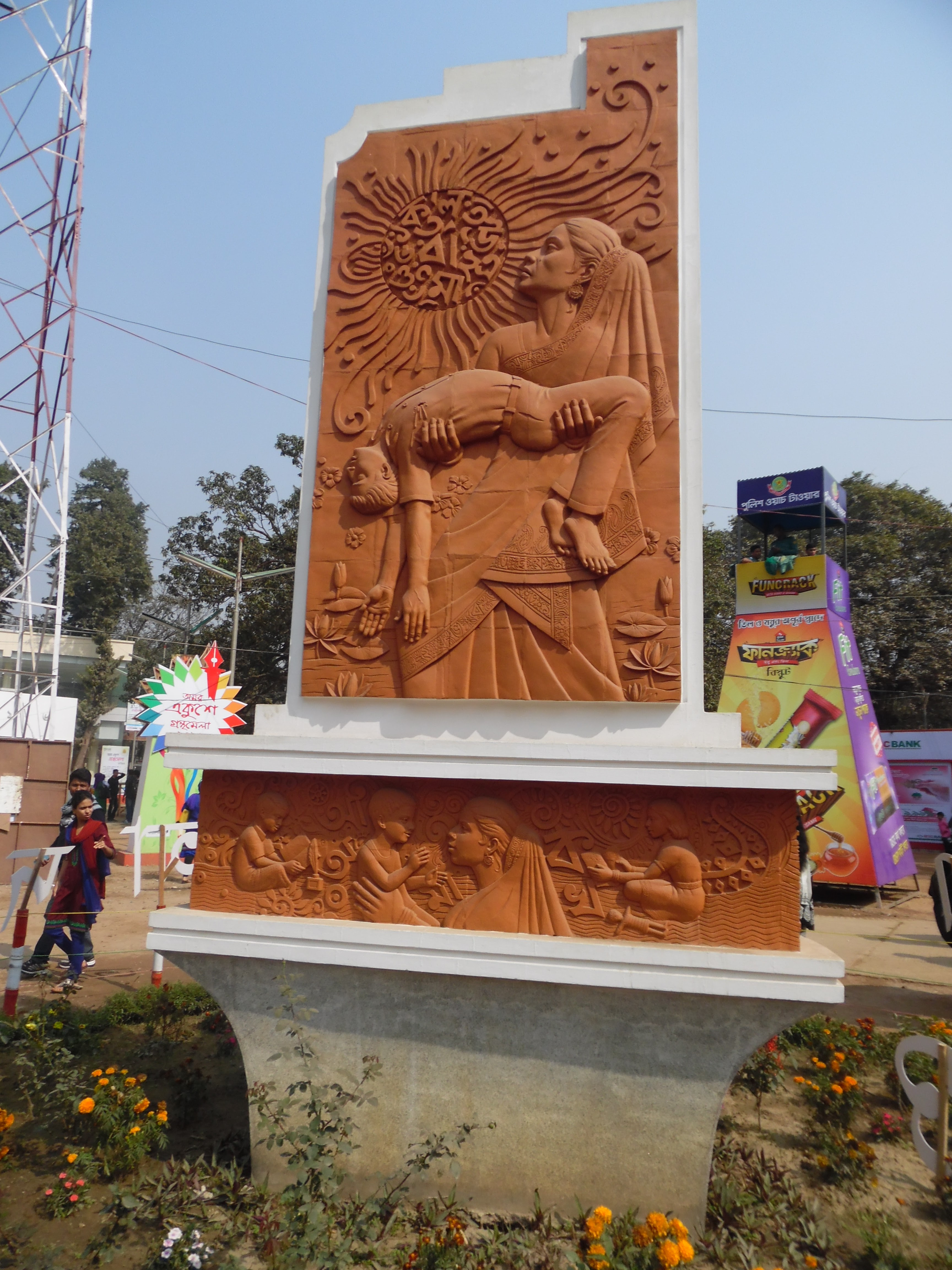
Moder Gorob, back view
