= Jannatul Sumaiya Heme =

Bangladeshi actress, model and dancer

- জান্নাতুল সুমাইয়া হিমি
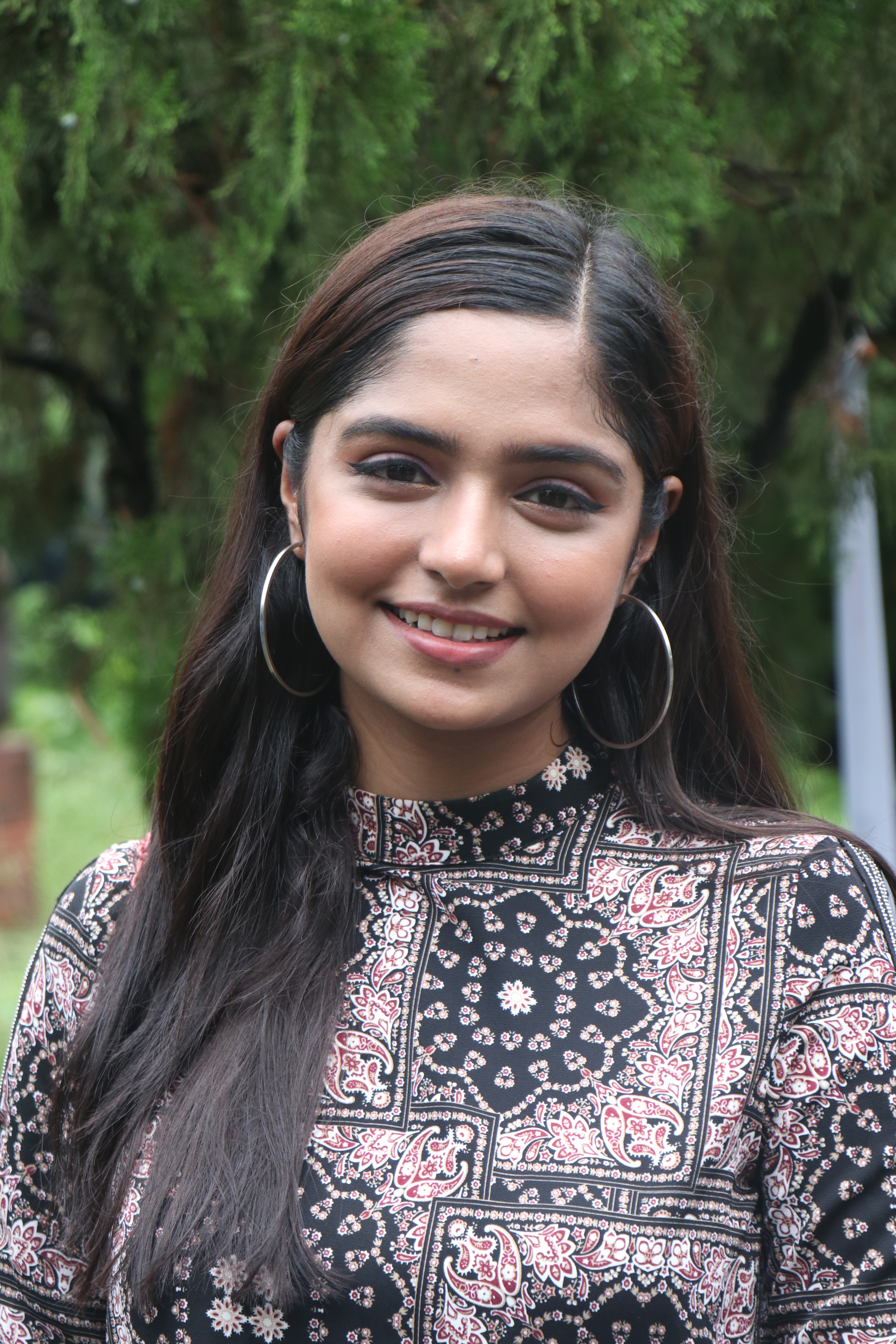
- Sumaiya in 2019
- Education: North South University
- Occupations: Actress, model and dancer
- Years active: 2014–present

Jannatul Sumaiya Himi (Bengali: জান্নাতুল সুমাইয়া হিমি) is a Bangladeshi actress, model and dancer. She won the Rong-RTV Twenty Twenty Colors Model Search competition in 2014. She made her film debut in Hothat Dekha, in which she played the younger version of a character portrayed by Debashree Roy. She is also known for her work in Bangladeshi television and web dramas, particularly with actor Niloy Alamgir.

== Early life and education ==
Himi developed an interest in acting during her childhood. Her mother used to take her to the television station in Rampura and encouraged her to pursue acting. She began appearing as a child artist and was also involved in dance and ramp modelling.

In 2017, she passed her Higher Secondary Certificate examination from Cambrian College in Dhaka with a GPA of 5.00. She later graduated from North South University with a degree in marketing in 2023, obtaining a CGPA of 3.58 out of 4.00.

== Career ==
Himi became publicly known after winning the Rong-RTV Twenty Twenty Colors Model Search competition in 2014. She subsequently worked in television dramas and other entertainment productions.

Her film debut was in the Bengali film Hothat Dekha, based on the poem of the same name by Rabindranath Tagore. In the film, she portrayed the younger version of a character played by Debashree Roy.

In 2017, Himi competed in the Miss World Bangladesh pageant. The pageant's final result became controversial, with contemporary reports differing in their descriptions of the runner-up positions. Jannatul Nayeem Avril was initially declared the winner, but Jessia Islam was later crowned after Avril was dethroned.

== Television and web dramas ==
In 2016, Himi appeared with Niloy Alamgir in the drama Jole Bheja Rong. They later worked together in more than 120 dramas, including Bandhur Bou and Biyer Porikkha.

Selected dramas featuring Himi and Alamgir include Shoshurbari-te Eid (শ্বশুরবাড়িতে ঈদ), Bekkhol Na Soja (বেক্কল না সোজা), Barir Pashe Shoshurbari (বাড়ির পাশে শ্বশুরবাড়ি) and Macher Manush (মাছের মানুষ).

A 2025 report stated that 109 dramas starring Himi had surpassed ten million views on YouTube.

== Filmography ==
Year	Film	Role
2017	Hothat Dekha	Younger version of Debashree Roy's character
