= Kayaria Eidgah Secondary School =

- কয়ারিয়া ঈদ্গাহ মাধ্যমিক বিদ্যালয়

Location
- Kayaria-Ramjanpur Hat Road; Kalkini; Madaripur, 7920; Bangladesh
- Coordinates: 22.99729°N 90.283082°E

Information
- Motto: শিক্ষাই আলো
- Established: 1968
- School board: Dhaka Education Board
- School district: Madaripur
- School number: DEB 110665
- Headmaster: Lal Miah Jomadar
- Grades: 6-10
- Gender: Girls and boys
- Website: deb110665.dhakaeducationboard.gov.bd

Kayaria Eidgah Secondary School is a secondary school in Kayaria Union, Kalkini Upazila, Madaripur District, Bangladesh. The school is a government-registered high school under the Board of Intermediate and Secondary Education, Dhaka.

The EIIN number of the school is 110665. The geographical coordinates of the school's location are 23°4'31.79" North, 90°13'36.53" East.

The school was established for educating the female population of Kayaria Union, and is the oldest school in Kayaria Union Council. The Union previously had establishments for secondary education, but girls were not permitted to attend. The people of the village contributed to the development of the school by supplying funding and building materials.

Students in 6th to 8th grade who graduate are required to take the Junior School Certificate (JSC). Students in 10th grade take the Secondary School Certificate. Departments of the school include Science, Arts (Humanities) and Business Studies (Commerce).
