= Charmuguria Eco-Park =

Eco-Park in Dhaka Division, Bangladesh

- Location within Bangladesh
- Location: Noyachar, Kumarkhali, Madaripur Sadar, Madaripur, Dhaka
- Coordinates: 23.1744508°N 90.2067581°E
- Area: 4.20 ha (10.4 acres)
- Established: 2015

Charmuguria Eco-Park is a Eco-Park located in Madaripur district of Dhaka division in central Bangladesh.

== Location ==
The Eco-Park is located in Nayachar area of Kumarakhali mouza in Madaripur Sadar upazila of Madaripur district.

== Description ==
The area of the Eco-Park is 4.20 hectares. The Eco-Park was established in 2015. Charmuguria is mainly known for monkeys. In 2015, Two to two-and-a-half thousand monkeys live in Charmuguria. The Forest Department set up a sanctuary for monkeys in the Nayachar area for their relocation, although it was not possible to take the monkeys there completely.
