= Fasiatala =

Coordinates: 23.1115°N 90.2688°E

Phasiatala is a village in Kalkini Upazila, Madaripur District, Bangladesh, located 350 km south west of the capital Dhaka.

== See also ==
- List of villages in Bangladesh
