= Kalkini Syed Abul Hossain University College =

- কালকিনি সৈয়দ আবুল হোসেন বিশ্ববিদ্যালয় কলেজ

Location
- 7920, Kalkini Upazila, Madaripur; Bangladesh
- Coordinates: 23.0732°N 90.2323°E

Information
- Founded: 1 July 1972
- Founder: Syed Abul Hossain
- School district: Madaripur
- Principal: Md.Asraful Islam
- Staff: 20
- Faculty: 67
- Campus size: 7 acre
- Campus type: Suburban
- Houses: 2
- Affiliation: Bangladesh National University
- Website: web.archive.org/web/20160221111317/http://ksahuc.com/home

Kalkini Syed Abul Hossain University College is a higher secondary school as well as a degree college affiliated to the National University. It is situated in Kalkini Upazilla, Madaripur, Bangladesh. It was founded by Member of Parliament Syed Abul Hossain. It is one of the oldest and renowned college in Kalkini Thana of Madaripur District.

== History ==
The college was established in Kalkini Upazila, Madaripur in July, 1972. It was established by Syed Abul Hossain because of the crisis in the education sector of the new born Bangladesh.

== Campus ==
The college's 7-acre main campus is centered on Pangasiya village under Kalkini Thana, approximately 3 kilometres (1.9 mi) east of the Dhaka-Barisal Highway. The college contains the central administrative offices and main libraries of the college, academic buildings including two hostels for boys and girls.

== Academic program ==
- Higher Secondary: Arts, Business Studies and Science
- B. Com: Social Science, Business Studies and Science
- Honors: Bengali, English, Political Science, History, Social Work, Management, Accounting, Marketing, Mathematics and Physics
- Masters: Bengali, Political Science

== Library ==
The library was established in 1972 at the time of establishment of the college. There are 20,000 books in the library with well decorated reading room.

== Faculty and staff ==
- Regular Teacher: 57
- Part-time Teacher: 10
- Office Staff: 20

== Dormitories ==
Kalkini Syed Abul Hossain University College has 2 dormitories: one for boys, another one for girls.
