= Panichatra =

Panichatra পানিছত্র
- Residential area
- Location of Panichatra in Bangladesh
- Coordinates: 23°10′4.7″N 90°12′48.4″E
- Country: Bangladesh
- Division: Dhaka Division
- District: Madaripur District
- Upazila: Madaripur Sadar
- Local government: Madaripur Municipality
- Ward No: 04-05

Area
  - Total: 0.6746514 km^{2} (0.2604844 sq mi)

Population (2011)
  - Total: 3,413
  - Density: 5,059/km^{2} (13,100/sq mi)
- Time zone: UTC+06:00
- Postal code: 7900
- Telephone area code: +88 0661

Panichatra (Bengali: পানিছত্র) is a residential area of Madaripur town in central Bangladesh.

== Geographical location ==
Panichatra is located under Madaripur Sadar upazila. Its total area is 16.61 acres (.0746514 km^{2}). It is bounded on the south by Saidarbali, Mubarakdi and Kulpaddi, on the south-east by Kulpaddi, on the east by Mahisherchar, on the north by Char Madanrai and on the west by Police Lines and Shakuni.

Panichatra can be divided into North and South Panichatra through wards 4 and 5.

== Administrative structure ==
Administrative activities of Panichatra area are under Madaripur Municipality. It is part of Madaripur-2 constituency No. 219 of the Jatiya Sangsad. Panichatra area is located in wards 4 and 5 under 703 mouza of Madaripur municipality.

The area is divided into several mahalla -

- Sang Panichatra,
- Panichatra Dighi,
- Bankers Colony.

== Population ==
The total population of Panichatra area is 3413 (441 + 2972) in 795 (109 + 686) families. Males constitute 49.22% of the population and females 50.78%. The highest number of ethnic groups is 93.38% Islam, Hindu 7.59%, Christian 0% and Buddhist 0.03%.

== Education ==
Panichatra has an average literacy rate of 86.85%, higher than the national average of 68.8%: male literacy is 88.8%, and female literacy is 84.9%. There is 1 Ebtedayi Madrasa, 1 Secondary School (including Primary, Boys and Girls), 1 Primary School and 1 Kindergarten in this area.

Notable educational institutions are:

- Al-Jabir High School (1981);
- Dargakhola Government Primary School (1926);
- Children's Grace (Kindergarten) School.

== Numerical statistics ==
=== Religious places of worship ===
There are six mosques and two temples in Panichatra area.

=== Health ===
There are two private hospitals and one health and family planning center, one eye hospital and one kidney hospital in Panichatra area.

- Islami Bank A. R. Hawladar Community Hospital Madaripur Limited;
- Campus Kidney and Dialysis Center;
- K. I. Digital Hospital and Diagnostic Center;
- Marie Stopes Clinic.

=== Government and non-government organizations ===
There are three government offices, three clubs, two cooperative societies and six NGOs and charities in Panichatra area.

== Places of interest ==
- Narayan Temple;
- Panichatra Dighi;
- Madaripur Legal Aid Association Training and Resource Center;
- Social Forestry Nursery and Training Center.

== Notable residents ==
- Mohammad Nizamuddin Ahmed – admiral, Chief of the Bangladesh Navy (2015–2019);

== See also ==
- Madaripur Sadar
- Madaripur District
