= Panchanan Chakraborty =

Indian revolutionarist

- পঞ্চানন চক্রবর্তী
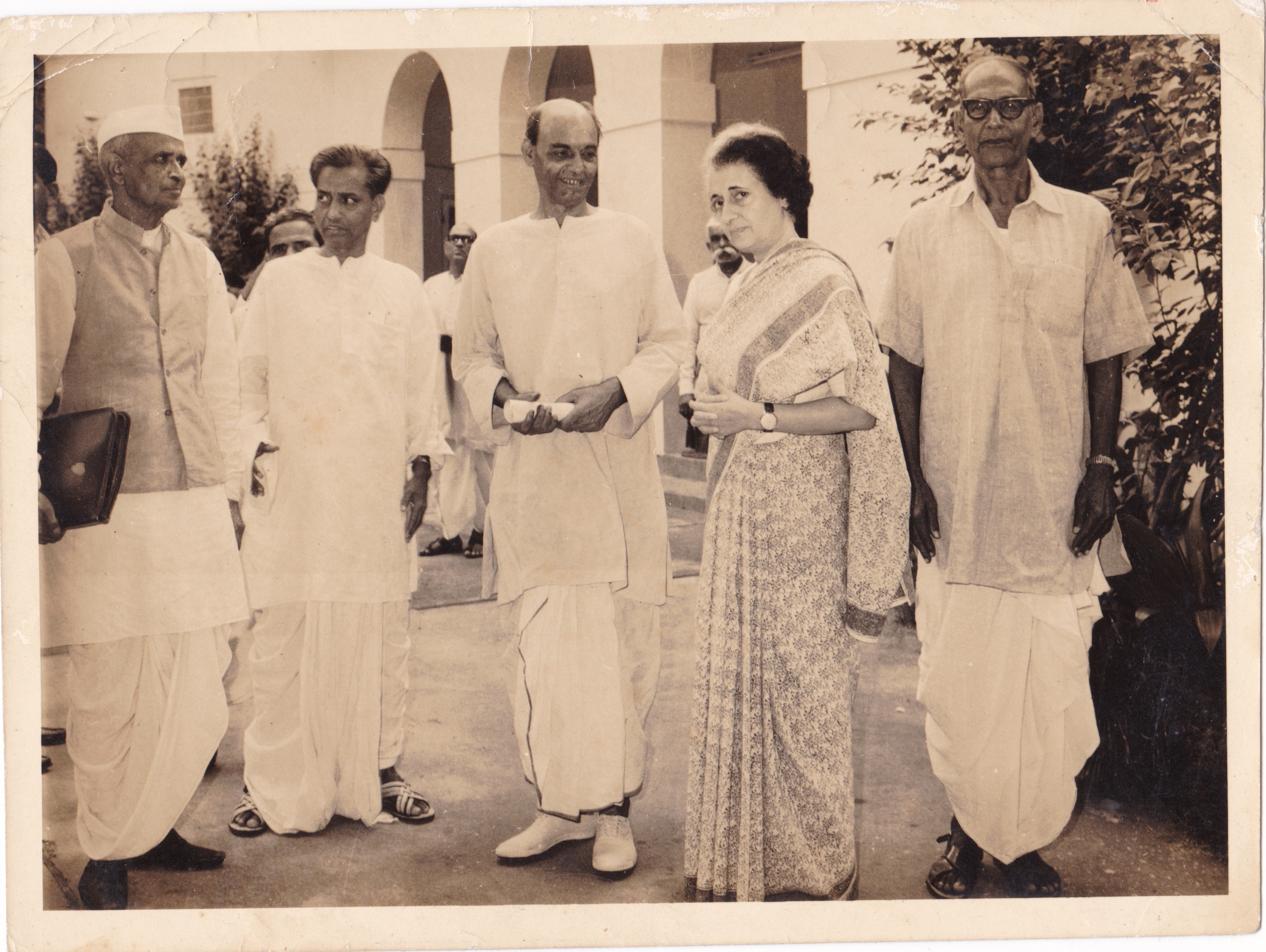
- Panchanan Chakraborty is standing with Indira Gandhi
- Pronunciation: Pañcānana Cakrabartī
- Born: 1900
- Died: 1995 (aged 94–95); Calcutta
- Monuments: Statue of Panchanan Chakrabarty
- Other names: Chakraborty
- Height: 6 ft (183 cm)

Panchanan Chakravarti (or Chakraborty, Bengali: পঞ্চানন চক্রবর্তী; 1900–1995) was a Bengali Indian revolutionary, one of the creators of the Revolt group after the momentary unification of the Anushilan Samiti and the Jugantar in the 1920s. Friend of the poet Kazi Nazrul Islam, he was a close associate of Subhas Chandra Bose.

== Formative years ==
Panchanan Chakraborty was the third child of Chandrakanta and Saralasundari; he had two elder sisters, Manorama and Sarojini, and his sister Subhashini and brother Haripada Chakraborty [Triple MA in Bengali, English, Sanskrit] were born after him. Completing his primary schooling at the Kalibari Pathshala and Guru Training Pathshala of Madaripur in the district of Faridpur in Bengal Presidency (now in Bangladesh).

Panchanan Chakraborty under his mother's initiative went to Madaripur High School, this establishment was looked down upon by the police since it had produced fiery revolutionaries like Chittapriya Ray Chaudhuri, Niren Dasgupta and Manoranjan Sengupta all of them had belonged to the regional Madaripur Samiti led by Purnachandra Das alias Purna Das and had chosen to die fighting by the side of Bagha Jatin or Jatindranath Mukherjee at Balasore, in 1915.

Obstinate by nature, Panchanan Chakraborty was further influenced by his father's cousin Jagadamba Devi who rattled the ancestors of the British during the Great Indian Freedom Movement and happened to be uncompromising, truthful, and a daredevil. Swami Vivekananda’s instruction of "leading a man’s life worth the name" counted much for Panchanan. He decided to consecrate his life for the freedom of the Motherland. While joining volunteers for social service, his passion was to measure his force with that of the police.

In 1913, during a house-search, when the police broke the padlock of a tin suitcase containing Panchanan Chakraborty's stationery, the boy pounced on the inspector, caught him by the collar and demanded an explanation. Soon, when he was arrested during a skirmish with the River Police, the S.D.O., Mr Doneham, praised the student's attachment to law and order, and censured the group of inspectors, before Panchanan was released. As a schoolboy, once with his classmates, he demolished a stage to protest against a morally injurious play proposed by a magistrate; this served as a pretext to rusticate him.

Once a British India police Officer was interrogating Panchanan Chakraborty at his home to gather information about the source of the finances for The Great Indian Freedom Movement. He was threatened that his toe nails would be plucked out which was a basic procedure of torture then, if he did not come out clean and hand over all the financial details to the British India police. Responding to the threat, Panchanan Chakraborty ordered one of his innumerable servants to get a knife and right in front of the officer of the British India police chopped off his right toe thumb and offered as a gift to the officer. The interrogation was over and the officer left for his own good.

== Open politics ==
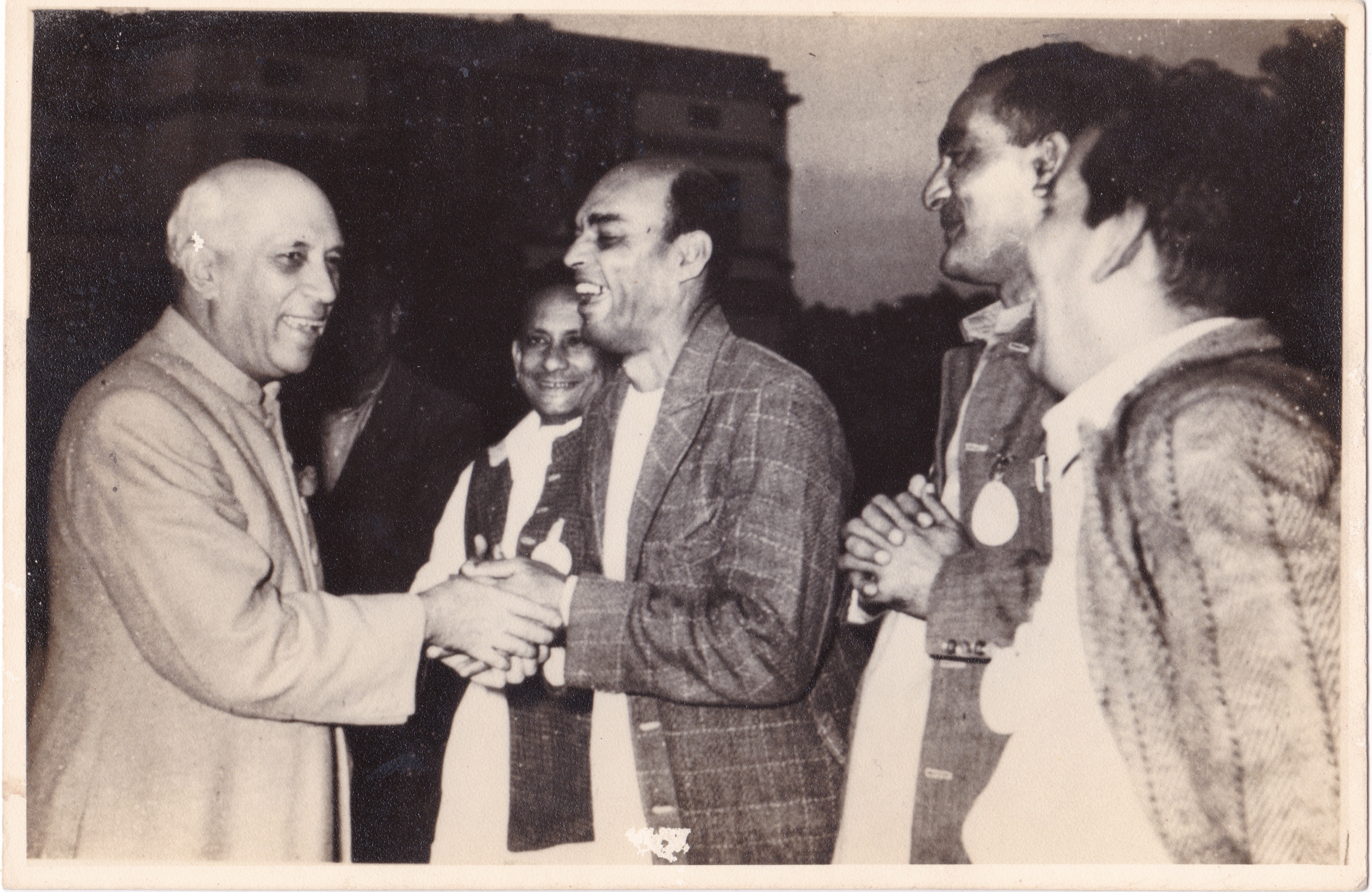
Panchanan Chakraborty shaking hands with Jawaharlal Nehru

In about 1919, when Purna Das was released, Panchanan Chakraborty joined his party and having participated in Gandhi's Non-cooperation movement, in December 1921 he was imprisoned for six months. Furious with the unruly conduct of the State prisoners, the district administrator, G.P. Hogg, appeared on the scene with armed police. As was customary, the prisoners had to bow before the dignitaries; singling out the disobedient political prisoners, he ordered them to behave themselves and salute him. Flabbergasted by their refusal, G P Hogg chose Suren Sinha, the headmaster of the Phulia School, as his first target to be flogged. Noticing Panchanan Chakraborty's indignation at the sight of the bleeding and yelling teacher, Hogg approached him: "Are you going to salute, now?" To the cheeky question, "Salute whom?" Hogg replied: "Salute His Majesty and me, as His representative!" Panchanan Chakraborty retorted: "I care neither for His Majesty nor for you." Having been duly flogged, as soon as Panchanan Chakraborty saw that the fetters were removed, he walked up to Hogg and standing face to face, asked him: "Well, Mr Hogg, have you had the salaam?"

Gandhi reported this incident in his Young India, while Motilal Nehru placed Panchanan's photo on his desk. (Source: Pabitrakumar, p9). Transferred to Alipore Central Jail, Panchanan came close to Deshabandhu Chittaranjan Das and Subhas Chandra Bose among other State prisoners. After release, in 1922, Deshabandhu asked Purna Das to form the Bengal Provincial Volunteers' Corps; the latter, under Panchanan Chakraborty's leadership, directed a Gandhi-style of campaign (satyagraha) against Satish Giri, the despicable Mohant ("High Priest") of the Tarakeshwar temple. Arrested again and imprisoned in Berhampore prison, Panchanan Chakraborty met Bose again, before the latter was transferred to Mandalay. Bhupendra Kumar Datta in Rangoon Jail was maliciously informed by Mr Lowman, Director of the Intelligence Department, that all the revolutionary units had had their lot of agents provocateurs, thanks to the Police initiative.

== The Revolt Group ==
At this juncture, inside the prison, Panchanan Chakraborty was among those who encouraged the under-trial State prisoners of the Jugantar and the Anushilan Samiti to stop amusing the police with their internecine animosity and come to terms. Thus united, they maintained their collaboration with Gandhi's movement, deciding, however, to stick to their initially radical ethics Bhupendra Kumar Datta took charge of the Jugantar workers and Rabindramohan Sen those of the Anushilan. Soon, shunning the political stunts of the elderly leaders, dissident factions from both these parties united together as the Revolt Group, otherwise baptised by the Police as the New (or Advanced) Violence Party under younger revolutionaries like the Chittagong-famous Ananta Singh, Ganesh Ghosh and Panchanan Chakraborty.

Released in 1928, Panchanan Chakraborty learnt that the swarajya ("self-rule") that Gandhi had been claiming since 1919 was merely a Dominion status and not a complete independence from the British, contrary to what Sri Aurobindo had demanded since the beginning; he and several other revolutionaries were disappointed by this bluff. Gandhi and Nehru obtained from Subhas Bose the promise that the radicals would not create another Surat-like pandemonium during the forthcoming session of the Congress Party at Kolkata where the British would receive an ultimatum that if Dominion Status was not granted by 31 December 1929, Gandhi would launch an agitation. In reply, a desperate Bose revived the Bengal Provincial Volunteers Corps that he had formed in 1922 under Deshabandhu's guidance, and created the Bengal Volunteers where Bhupendra Kumar Datta, Purnachandra Das, Rabindramohan Sen, Satya Gupta, Hemantakumar Bose and Panchanan Chakraborty were eminent officers. In addition to rousing a country-wide sensation, Subhas Bose took the command of the Bengal Provincial Congress Committee as its president.

When Panchanan Chakraborty learned that a consignment of firearms was available for five thousand rupees, he urged his friend, the revolutionary poet Kazi Nazrul Islam, to collect the money from Nazrul's musician and actress friends. Gandhi sensed a revolutionary climate in India. On 1 January 1930, the Congress declared Independence to be its political objective and authorised a general Civil Disobedience Movement. In March 1930, Gandhi set out for his Dundee March, as an obviously popular non-violent measure. While the police had been concentrating all its energy to negotiate with the Gandhian strategy, the Chittagong armoury raid took place on 18 April, aiming to set up a Provisional Independent Government with Surya Sen alias Masterda at its head. Rightly suspecting his connection with these revolutionaries, Panchanan Chakraborty was arrested on 23 April and sentenced for a term of eight years. A flow of Marxist literature inside the prison animated the patriots’ debates : forget the country's salvation in the name of a universal revolution? Panchanan Chakraborty and his associates chose to remain faithful to the first task.

== The New Era ==
On coming out of the prison in 1938, Panchanan Chakraborty and his friends like Nazrul Islam, Amalendu Dasgupta, Bibhupada Kirti invited Subhas Bose to meet a yogi called Baradacharan Majumdar who could help Subhas to rectify his political actions. It was the period when he was elected President of the All India Congress but having been shabbily treated by Gandhi, he resigned and formed his own party, the Forward Bloc. Panchanan Chakraborty with his associates backed Subhas in his campaign against the notorious Holwell Monument in Kolkata, as well as in his criticism of the Wartime Congress policy. Once again, along with Subhas Bose and his supporters, Panchanan Chakraborty went to prison in 1940. Meanwhile, in 1938, the Jugantar had ceased to be and, consequently, the Revolt Group had no more reasons to exist.

On coming out of the Prison in March 1946, Panchanan Chakraborty conceived the socio-cultural association Shantisena (‘Peace Brigade’) and, as its president, he devoted his time and energy to commemorating the glorious part Bengal had played in the history of India's struggle for freedom, considering Bagha Jatin or Jatindranath Mukherjee to have been the Ideal Revolutionary, and Subhas Bose to have incarnated as the Soul of India. Lucid and approachable and serving as guide to generations of thinkers and activists, Panchanan Chakraborty died in his Kolkata home on 23 September 1995. Poet by nature, gourmet and connoisseur in the field of Hindustani classical music.

Panchanan Chakraborty was fond of exchanging letters regularly with people he loved. In form of a message for the future, he wrote about Jatindranath Mukherjee :

"Jatin the Leader obsessed my heart and my mind. Neither for his battle, nor for his patriotism, nor even for his skill in organisation; he became my idol exclusively because of his dauntless audacity to sacrifice his life. In my conscious and even subliminal mind I have searched for him through my actions, throughout my life…" -(Pabitrakumar, p29).

== Death ==
Panchanan Chakraborty died in his home in Calcutta, India in 1995 of natural causes.

The funeral and later the unveiling of the statue of Panchanan Chakrabarty was attended by Buddhadeb Bhattacharya, the then Information and Broadcasting Minister of Government of West Bengal [he also became the Chief Minister later] under the Chief Minister-ship of Jyoti Basu who as a learner of Politics spent his initial years at the residence of Panchanan Chakrabarty.
