= Dasar Upazila =

Upazila in Dhaka Division, Bangladesh

Dasar ডাসার
- Upazila
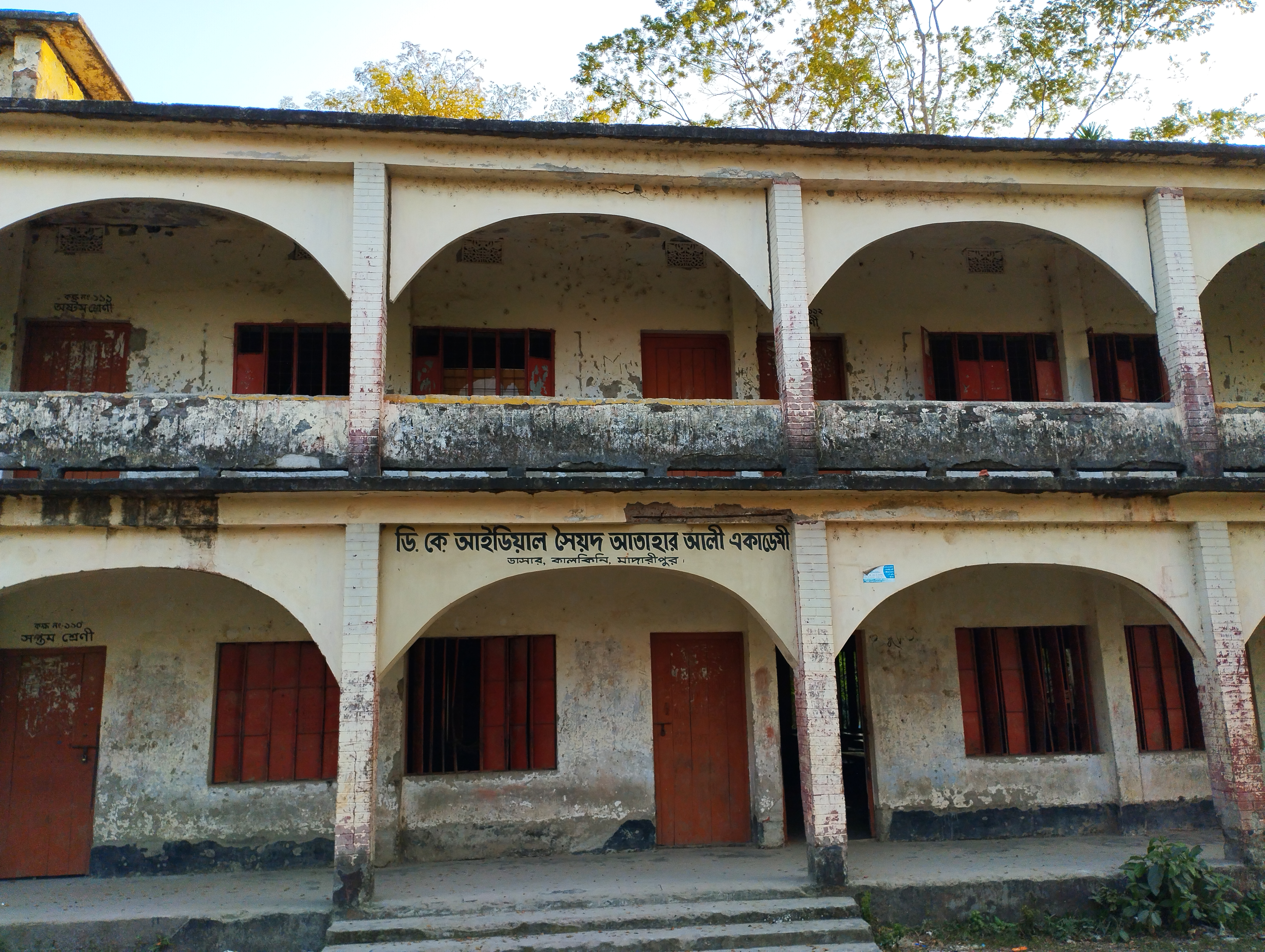
- D. K. Ideal Syed Atahar Ali Academy College

- Coordinates: 23.09°N 90.13°E
- Country: Bangladesh
- Division: Dhaka
- District: Madaripur

Area
  - Total: 76.08 km^{2} (29.37 sq mi)

Population (2022)
  - Total: 75,172
  - Density: 988.1/km^{2} (2,559/sq mi)
- Time zone: UTC+6 (BST)
- Postal code: 7920
- Website: dasar.madaripur.gov.bd

Dasar (Bengali: ডাসার) is an upazila of Madaripur district in the Division of Dhaka, Bangladesh.

== History ==
A police investigation centre was set up in Dasar on February 2, 2012. Later, the Dasar Thana (police station) was formed on March 2, 2013, with five unions of Kalkini Upazila. Shortly thereafter, the local administration proposed to convert Dasar into upazila. At the meeting of the National Implementation Committee on Administrative Restructuring (NICAR) on November 20, 2017, the Dasar Thana (police station) was supposed to be upgraded to upazila but it was rejected and asked to conduct a further examination. Then on 26 July 2021, it was decided to make Dasar a full-fledged upazila at the 117th meeting of NICAR.

== Administrative areas ==
Dasar Upazila consists of 5 unions and 67 mouzas.

=== Unions ===
- Gopalpur Union
- Kazibakai Union
- Baligram Union
- Dasar Union
- Nabagram Union

== Geography ==
The geographical location of Dasar Upazila is 23.0609°N 90.1490°E. Its total area is 76.08 km^{2}. Dasar upazila is bounded on the north by Madaripur Sadar upazila, on the south by Agailjhara Upazila, on the east by Kalkini upazila and on the west by Kotalipara upazila. The Palrodi river flows over the upazila.

== Demographics ==
According to the 2022 Bangladeshi census, Dasar Upazila had 17,939 households and a population of 75,172. 9.38% of the population were under 5 years of age. Dasar had a literacy rate (age 7 and over) of 77.33%: 80.52% for males and 74.46% for females, and a sex ratio of 91.56 males for every 100 females. 3,682 (4.90%) lived in urban areas.

Religions in Dasar Upazila (2022)
Religion	Percent
Islam	75.11%
Hinduism	24.24%
Christianity	0.65%

Population by religion in Union
Union	Muslim	Hindu	Others
Baligram Union	22,600	1,719	0
Dasar Union	11,873	3,923	2
Gopalpur Union	9,171	413	0
Kazibakai Union	12,278	294	1
Nabagram Union	537	11,877	484

🟩 Muslim majority 🟧 Hindu majority

According to the 2011 Census of Bangladesh, Dasar Upazila had 15,595 households and a population of 71,494. 16,849 (23.57%) were under 10 years of age. Dasar had a literacy rate (age 7 and over) of 54.02%, compared to the national average of 51.8%, and a sex ratio of 986 females per 1000 males. The entire population lived in rural areas.
