= Manoranjan Sengupta =

Indian revolutionist (1896–1915)

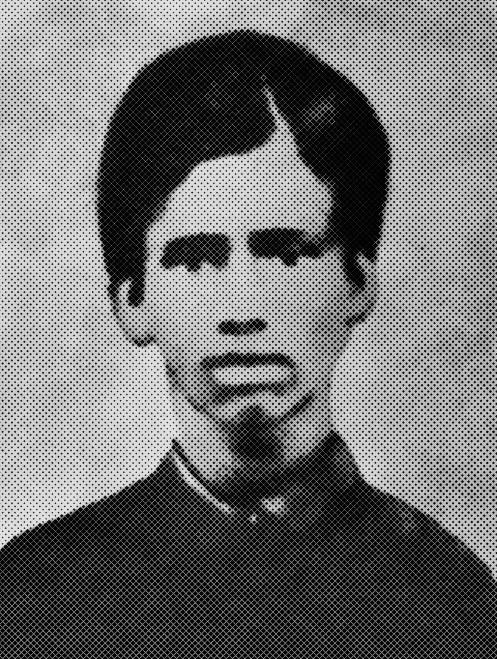
- Born: 1898; Khairbhanga, Madaripur, present day Bangladesh British India
- Died: 3 December 1915 (aged 16–17); Balasore Central Jail, Orissa, British India
- Cause of death: Execution by hanging
- Movement: Indian Independence Movement

Manoranjan Sengupta (1898 – 3 December 1915) was a revolutionary and a participant in the Indian independence movement. He was a colleague of revolutionary Purnachandra Das and a member of the Madaripur Samiti, a secret revolutionary organization led by Purnachandra; a secret unit of Jugantar. He was arrested as an accused in the first Faridpur conspiracy case in December 1913 and spent five months in jail. He attached with senior Bengali revolutionary Jatindranath Mukherjee alias Bagha Jatin in Christmas Day Plot for procuring arms from Germany, Japan, America. He was involved in the collection of arms and ammunition from the German ship "Maverick" off the coast of Baleshwar in Orissa in September 1915 under the leadership of the revolutionary Bagha Jatin.

== Early life ==
Sengupta was born in September 1898 in the village of Khairbhanga under Madaripur Sadar upazila. His father's name was Haladhar Sengupta, who was an accountant in a local estate. Manoranjan's elder brother Prafulla Sengupta was a teacher at Madaripur High School. Manoranjan's second brother Chittaranjan Sengupta was Homeopathic Doctor and several times went to jail during British Period. Manoranjan was a master of stick and sword fighting. He was first a revolutionary member of the Madaripur Brati Samiti and later of the Madaripur Samiti in 1910. He along with three others, Chittapriya, Jyotish and his cousin (Maternal) Nirendranath, joined the Jugantar party under the leadership of Bagha Jatin. In 1913. He was imprisoned on charges of Faridpur Conspiracy Case. After their release from prison, they shot and killed Nirad Haldar, a notorious intelligence officer, in 1915. He was involved in the collection of arms and ammunition from the German ship "Maverick" off the coast of Baleshwar in Orissa in September 1915.

== Death ==
Late at night on 6 September 1915, Bagha Jatin or Jatin Mukherjee returned to his temporary abode in Mahaldiha. With Chittapriya Ray Chaudhuri, Jyotish Chandra Pal, Manoranjan and Nirendranath Dasgupta. On 6 September, the whole day was spent in the deep forest. In the early morning of 9 September, he reached Balaramgarh in Baleshwar at Buribalam (in Orissa it is called "Budhabalang") On the banks of the river. They swam to the other side of the river and took refuge in a dry ditch, quite suitable for battle. In contrast, Charles Tegart, Commander Rutherford, and District Magistrate Kilby appeared with numerous armed police and military forces. Behind the bushes, there are five people led by Bagha Jatin, with mauser pistols in their hands. When the fighting started, Chittapriya Roy Chowdhury was killed on the spot by the police. Manoranjan, Jyotish Pal and Nirendranath Dasgupta surrendered. Later Manoranjan and Nirendranath were sentenced to death on 16 October 1915. Both of them were hanged on 3 December 1915. Jyotish Chandra Pal also did not live long. While serving his sentence in Andaman Cellular Jail, he went insane under the brutal torture of the police. Jyotish died on 4 December 1924 at Behrampur Ashram.
