= Madaripur Government College =

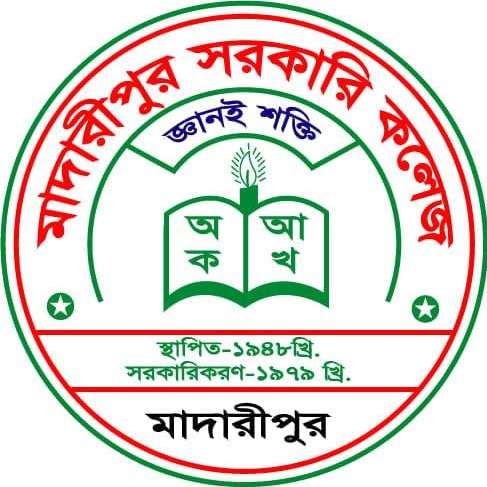
- Logo of MGC
- Motto: Knowledge is power
- Founder: then prime minister of Pakistan Khwaja Nazimuddin
- Established: 1948
- Focus: Graduation & Post Graduation
- Principal: Professor Md. Lutfor Rahman Khan
- Formerly called: Govt. Nazimuddin College
- Location: Madaripur, Dhaka Division, Bangladesh
- Coordinates: 23.169171°N 90.202547°E
- Interactive map of Madaripur Government College
- Website: www.mgc.ac.bd

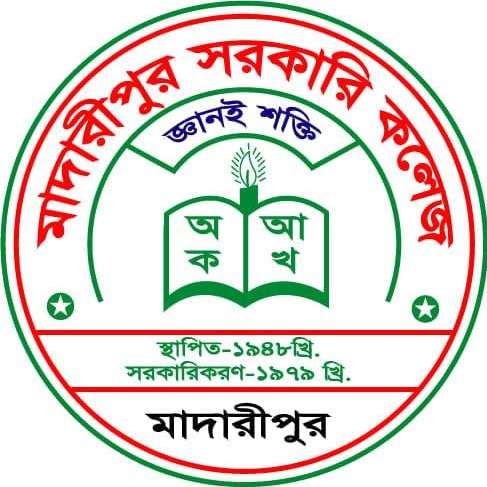
Logo of MGC

Madaripur Government College (formerly Government Nazimuddin College) is a government graduate college at Madaripur District in Bangladesh. The college was established in 1948. The name of the college was changed from Government Nazimuddin College to Madaripur Government College in 2020.

== History ==
Madaripur Government College has established as a private college on 16 September 1948 with the first year class activities of Higher Secondary. The college was governmentized in 1989. It was initiated by some local dignitaries. In the year 1938 Sher-e-Bangla A.K. Fazlul Haque came to Madaripur during the election campaign. It was then that the first demand from the local leaders was to set up a college in Madaripur. Later, A.K. Fazlul Haque came to Madaripur as the Chief Minister in 1941 to inaugurate an exhibition of art, culture and agriculture. He assured all possible help and cooperation when the demand for re-establishment of the college was raised at the event. Then in 1948 Hussain Shaheed Suhrawardy came to a public meeting in Madaripur. He voted in favor of the establishment of the college and advised the administration to establish the college by raising funds. Under his direction, the then SDO WB Qadri took a leading role in raising funds for the establishment of the college. At that time there was a slight difference of opinion among the locals about the naming of the college. Congress supporters wanted the name of the college to be Madaripur College; Muslim League supporters wanted the name Islamia College; and the local business class wanted the name Charmuguria Merchants College. Finally, at the request of Mr. Yusuf Ali Chowdhury (aka Mohan Mia), a politician of Faridpur, the college was renamed as Nazimuddin College after the then Prime Minister of Pakistan Khwaja Nazimuddin. Those who contributed to the establishment of this college are the then MLA Mr. Eskander Ali Khan, former MLA Mr. Abul Fazal, Mr. Mominuddin Ahmed, Mr. Daliluddin Ahmed, Mr. Alim Uddin Ahmed, Mr. Abdul Hamid Sikder, Mr. Achmat Ali. Khan, Mr. Mir Abdul Majid, Mr. Syed Uddin Ahmed, Mr. Abdur Rahman Hawladar and many more. Two years after its establishment, in 1950, bachelor degree and in 1997 honors and post-graduate courses were introduced in this college. At present, 13 subjects are taught in Honors level and Arts, Science and Commerce are taught in Higher Secondary level. The number of students is about 6,000. Later in 2019 the name of the college was changed to Madaripur Government College.

== Courses ==
List of undergraduate and postgraduate courses and departments of Government Nazimuddin College-

Degree (pass) courses

- BA (Pass)
- BSS (Pass)
- BSc (Pass)
- Bcom (Pass)

Undergraduate courses

- Bengali
- English
- History
- Islamic History and Culture
- Philosophy
- Political science
- Economy
- Accounting
- Management
- Physics
- Mathematics
- Chemistry
- Botany
- Zoology

Masters Final Episode Courses

- Bengali
- English
- History
- Islamic History and Culture
- Philosophy
- Political science
- Accounting
- Management
- Botany
