= A. N. B. High School =

Coordinates: 23.131362°N 89.959359°E

Aruakandi Natakhola Barokhola High School
- Rajoir Upazila, Madaripur District, Bangladesh

Information
- School type: Public School
- Gender: Co-educational
- Language: Bengali

Aruakandi Natakhola Barokhola High School is situated at the joined position of three villages named Aruakandi, Natakhola, and Barokhola in Kadambari Union, Rajoir Upazila, Madaripur District, Bangladesh.
