= Jor-bangla =

Jor-bangla or Jor Bangla may refer to:

- Jor-bangla style, a style of Bengal temple architecture.

== Places ==
- Jor Bangla Temple, a Krishna temple at Bankura district of West Bengal, India
- Gopinath Temple, Pabna, also known as Jor-Bangla Temple, a Krishna temple in Pabna District, Bangladesh
- Raja Ram Temple, also known as Jora Bangla Temple, a Hindu temple of Madaripur District, Bangladesh
