= Kotalipara Upazila =

Kotalipara কোটালীপাড়া
- Upazila
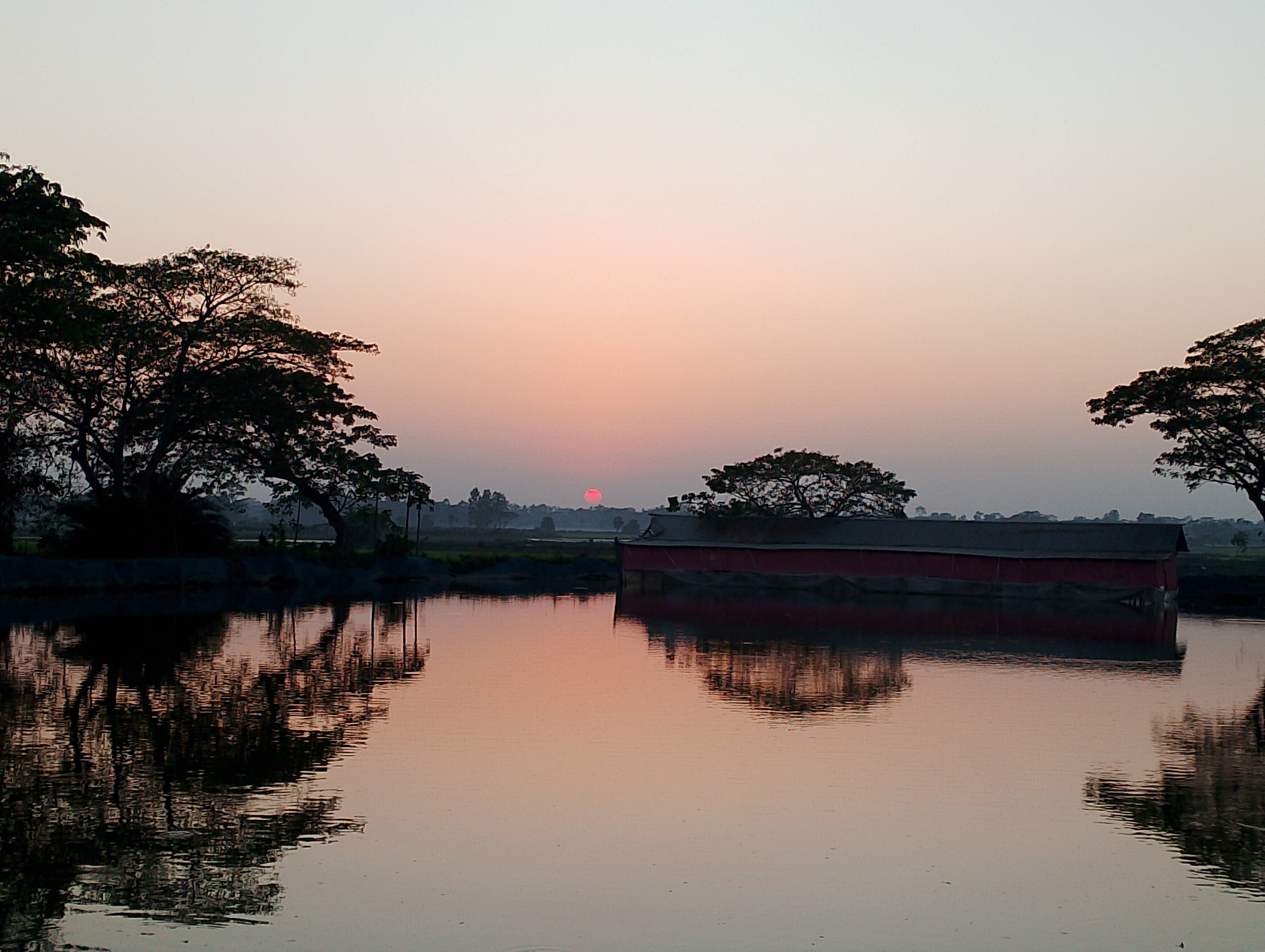
- Sunset over a pond in Kotalipara Upazila

- Coordinates: 22°59′N 89°59.5′E
- Country: Bangladesh
- Division: Dhaka
- District: Gopalganj

Area
  - Total: 355.90 km^{2} (137.41 sq mi)

Population (2022)
  - Total: 243,726
  - Density: 684.82/km^{2} (1,773.7/sq mi)
- Time zone: UTC+6 (BST)
- Postal code: 8110
- Area code: 06653
- Website: Official map of rupa_para

Kotalipara Upazila mauza geocode map

Kotalipara (Bengali: কোটালীপাড়া) is an upazila of Gopalganj District in the Division of Dhaka, Bangladesh. It is one of the five upazilas of Gopalganj.

== Geography ==
Kotalipara is located at 22.9833°N 89.9917°E. It has 48,029 households and a total area of 355.90 km^{2}. It is a mofussil town. It is 4–5 hours from Dhaka via highway by bus (Aricha point) and 3 hours from Mawa point. It is bordered to the north by Rajoir and Madaripur Sadar upazilas of Madaripur district, to the west by Gopalganj Sadar and Tungipara upazilas, to the south by Nazirpur Upazila of Pirojpur district, and to the east by Wazirpur and Agailjhara upazilas of Barisal district, and Dasar upazila of Madaripur district.

== History ==
Kotalipara was founded by Chandravarman of the Pushkarna dynasty of Vanga.

== Demographics ==
According to the 2022 Bangladeshi census, Kotalipara Upazila had 57,409 households and a population of 243,726. 9.16% of the population were under 5 years of age. Kotalipara had a literacy rate (age 7 and over) of 80.25%: 82.78% for males and 77.83% for females, and a sex ratio of 96.80 males for every 100 females. 42,589 (17.47%) lived in urban areas.

Religions in Kotalipara Upazila (2022)
Religion	Percent
Islam	50.55%
Hinduism	47.10%
Christianity	2.35%
Other or not stated	0.002%

Population by religion in Union/Paurashava
Union/Paurashava	Muslim	Hindu	Others
Kotalipara Paurashava	15,876	5,477	75
Amtali Union	15,363	2,767	222
Bandhabari Union	10,158	1,481	27
Hiran Union	20562	2,873	5
Kalabari Union	2,046	22,284	188
Kandi Union	5,128	11,945	670
Kushla Union	18,697	4,451	807
Pinjuri Union	18,954	3,896	4
Radhaganj Union	10,342	10,390	1377
Ramshil Union	882	15,884	907
Sadullapur Union	2,255	28,387	783
Suagram Union	2,944	4,946	665

🟩 Muslim majority 🟧 Hindu majority

According to the 2011 Census of Bangladesh, Kotalipara Upazila had 48,029 households and a population of 230,493. 58,162 (25.23%) were under 10 years of age. Kotalipara had a literacy rate (age 7 and over) of 59.16%, compared to the national average of 51.8%, and a sex ratio of 1031 females per 1000 males. 11,844 (5.14%) lived in urban areas.

As of the 1991 Bangladesh census, Kotalipara had a population of 206,195, of whom 102,198 were aged 18 or over. Males constituted 50.48% of the population, and females 49.52%. Kotalipara had an average literacy rate of 34.8% (7+ years), against the national average of 32.4%.

== Administration ==
Kotalipara Upazila is divided into Kotalipara Municipality and 12 union parishads: Amtali, Bandhabari, Ghagar, Hiran, Kalabari, Kandi, Kushla, Pinjuri, Radhaganj, Ramshil, Sadullapur and Suagram. The union parishads are subdivided into 101 mauzas and 208 villages.

Kotalipara Municipality is subdivided into 9 wards and 9 mahallas.

== Notable residents ==
- Haridas Siddhanta Bagish
- Tarapada Chakraborty
- Sukanta Bhattacharya
- Jogen Chowdhury
- Balai Dey
- Satin Sen
