= Rajoir Upazila =

Rajoir রাজৈর
- Upazila
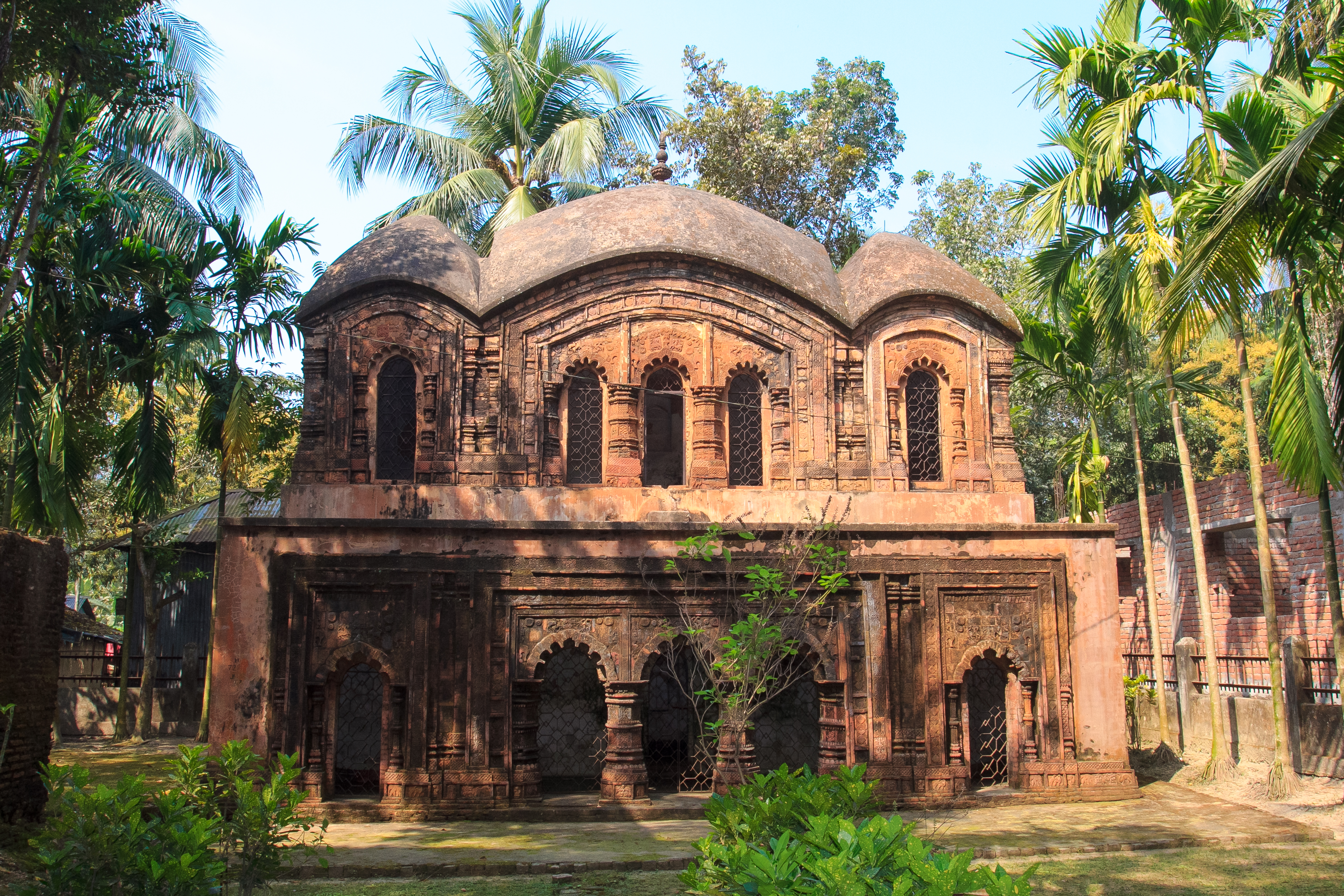
- Raja Ram Temple, Rajoir

- Coordinates: 23°12.5′N 90°2′E
- Country: Bangladesh
- Division: Dhaka
- District: Madaripur

Area
  - Total: 229.27 km^{2} (88.52 sq mi)

Population (2022)
  - Total: 245,316
  - Density: 1,070.0/km^{2} (2,771.3/sq mi)
- Time zone: UTC+6 (BST)
- Postal code: 7910
- Area code: 06623
- Website: rajoir.madaripur.gov.bd

Rajoir (Bengali: রাজৈর) is an upazila of Madaripur District in the Division of Dhaka, Bangladesh.

== Geography ==
Rajoir is located at 23.2083°N 90.0333°E. It has a total area of 229.27 km^{2}. It is bounded by Bhanga Upazila on the north, Kotalipara and Gopalganj Sadar upazilas on the south, Madaripur Sadar and Shibchar upazilas on the east, Muksudpur and Gopalganj Sadar upazilas on the west.

== Demographics ==
According to the 2022 Bangladeshi census, Rajoir Upazila had 58,525 households and a population of 245,316. 9.51% of the population were under 5 years of age. Rajoir had a literacy rate (age 7 and over) of 75.82%: 78.09% for males and 73.76% for females, and a sex ratio of 92.64 males for every 100 females. 65,680 (26.77%) lived in urban areas.

Religions in Rajoir Upazila (2022)
Religion	Percent
Islam	68.83%
Hinduism	30.85%
Other or not stated	0.32%

Population by religion in Union/Paurashava
Union/Paurashava	Muslim	Hindu	Others
Rajoir Paurashava	38,306	6,202	1
Amgram Union	9,048	16,749	709
Badarpasha Union	22,467	1,113	3
Bajitpur Union	12,110	8,814	7
Haridashdi Mahendradi Union	8,448	638	0
Hossainpur Union	12,971	1596	1
Ishibpur Union	17,309	178	0
Kabirajpur Union	14,084	643	1
Kadambari Union	3,946	23,106	63
Khalia Union	10,680	12,707	3
Paikpara Union	18,268	962	2
Rajoir Union	1,194	2,971	1

🟩 Muslim majority 🟧 Hindu majority

According to the 2011 Census of Bangladesh, Rajoir Upazila had 48,764 households and a population of 228,710. 55,233 (24.15%) were under 10 years of age. Rajoir had a literacy rate (age 7 and over) of 48.20%, compared to the national average of 51.8%, and a sex ratio of 1023 females per 1000 males. 21,401 (9.36%) lived in urban areas.

According to the 2001 Bangladesh census, Rajoir had a population of 218,095, including 110,233 males, 107,862 females; 146,727 Muslims, 70,393 Hindus, 962 Christians and 13 others.

As of the 1991 Bangladesh census, Rajoir had a population of 204,356. Males constituted 50.3% of the population, and females 49.7%. This Upazila's eighteen up population was 99620. Rajoir had an average literacy rate of 28.5% (7+ years), and the national average of 32.4% literate.

== Points of interest ==
Raja Ram Temple, a two-storied brick Hindu temple in the village of Khalia, dates from the 17th century. The center room of the upper story has a do-chala roof, while the rooms on either side have char-chala roofs.

== Administration ==
Rajoir Thana, now an upazila, was formed in 1914.

The upazila is divided into 11 union parishads: Amgram, Badar Pasha, Bajitpur, Haridasdi Mahendradi, Hosainpur, Isibpur, Kabirajpur, Kadambari, Khalia, Paik Para, and Rajoir. The union parishads are subdivided into 95 mauzas and 187 villages.

== Education ==
According to Banglapedia, Aruakandi-Natakhola-Barakhola High School, founded in 1963, is a notable secondary school.

== Notable people ==
- Dwarikanath Barori, lawyer and politician
- Gour Chandra Bala, lawyer and politician

== See also ==
- Upazilas of Bangladesh
- Districts of Bangladesh
- Divisions of Bangladesh
