= Ava Alam =

Ava Alam আভা আলম
- Born: Ava De; 26 December 1947; Madaripur, East Bengal, Dominion of Pakistan
- Died: 21 November 1976 (aged 28)
- Genres: Raga, Dhrupad, Classical
- Occupations: Music teacher, singer
- Instrument: Vocals
- Years active: 1959–1976

Ava Alam (1947–1976) was a Bangladeshi classical singer and music teacher. She was awarded Ekushey Padak in 1978 by the Government of Bangladesh.

== Early life and career ==
Ava was born in Madaripur town in the 26 December 1947. Her father name Haripada De. Her real name Ava De. When she married Tariqul Alam, a reputed lyricist in 1964 then she became known as Ava Alam.

Ava took music lesson from Mithun De and her father. Since 1959 when she was student of class eight she took part in classical music programs at the Dhaka center of Radio Pakistan. When the television service was launched in Dhaka, she was praised for playing classical music on TV. Surprised all the audience by performing one-hour long "Puria Dhaneshri" Raga while she attending the All Pakistan Music Conference. She also performed on different occasions in West Pakistan and India.

Ava was the Principal of Atik Music Academy, Co-Principal of Cantonment Music Academy and one of the Examiners of the Classical Music Examination of Dhaka University.

== Award ==
- Ekushey Padak Award (Posthumously, 1978).

== Death ==
Ava died on 21 November 1976.
