= Chittapriya Ray Chaudhuri =

Indian revolutionary (1894–1915)

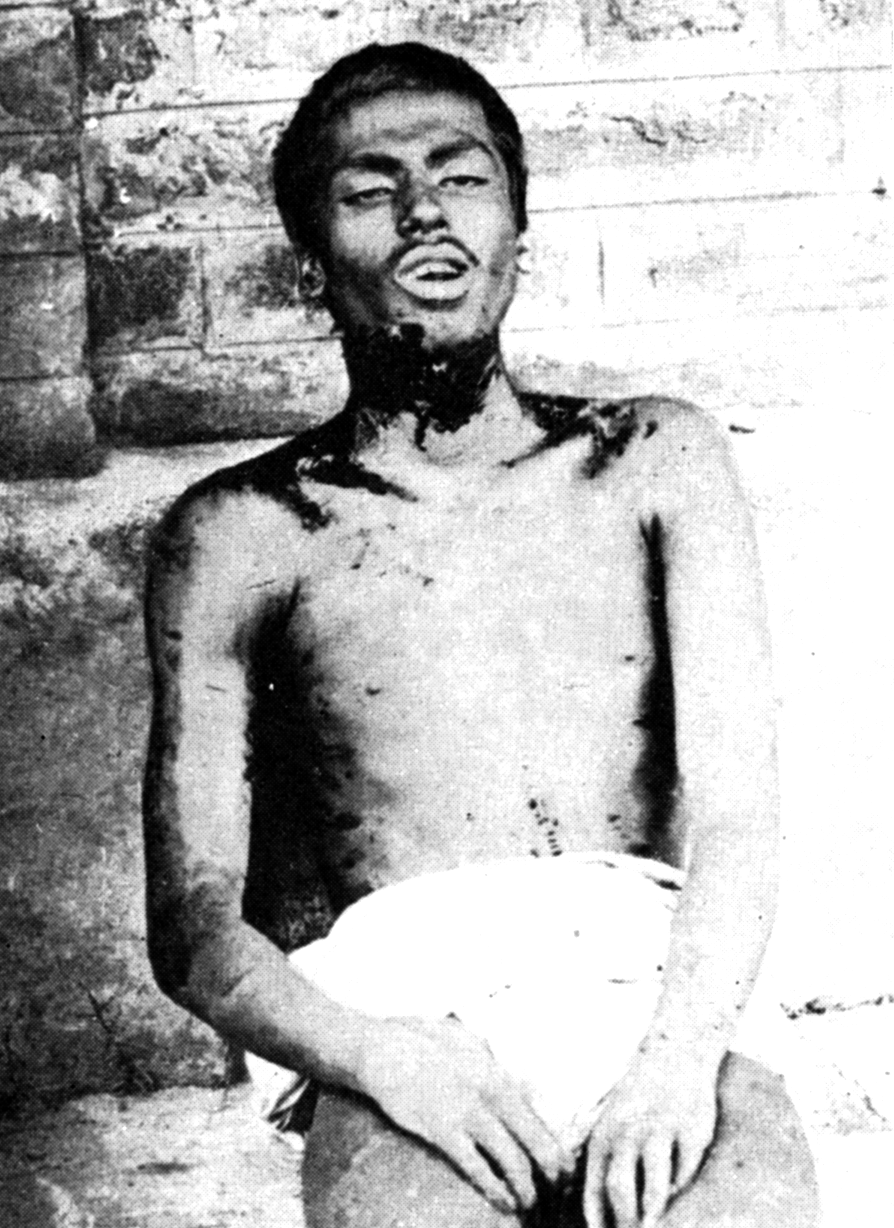
- Body of Chittapriya Ray Chaudhuri, photograph taken after the Buribalam encounter
- Born: 2 July 1894; Madaripur, Bengal Presidency, British India
- Died: 9 September 1915 (aged 21); Balasore, Orissa, British India
- Cause of death: Gunshot wounds
- Movement: Indian Independence Movement

Chittapriya Ray Chaudhuri (2 July 1894 – 9 September 1915) was a Bengali revolutionary and member of the Indian independence movement. Martyred at the age of twenty years, Ray Chaudhuri, was born in the Khalia of Mahishya landlord family in the Madaripur subdivision of Faridpur district in undivided Bengal. His father, Panchanan Ray Chaudhuri, who passed the entrance examination in the first year of his introduction to Calcutta University, was a teacher and an honorary magistrate. Well-built, Chittapriya Ray Chaudhuri was known for his daredevilry.

In Madaripur, Ray Chaudhuri with his friends Manoranjan Sengupta and Nirendranath Dasgupta joined the secret society of Purna Das. They took part in swadeshi dacoities led by him; were arrested and all were tried in the Faridpur Conspiracy Case (1913); but were released, after a few months of imprisonment, since the police failed to establish their allegations before the court.

In 1914, Purna Das accepted Bagha Jatin’s revolutionary line of a united armed assault on the British with arms support from Germany. From Faridpur, he sent his best boys, Chittapriya, Manoranjan, and Nirendranath to him. Within a month, Chittapriya and his friends assassinated two police officers and raised a large sum of money through dacoity in the Beleghata rice market.

== Revolutionary activities ==
Chittapriya Roy Choudhury was born on 2 July 1894 in a Mahishya zamindar family in Khalia village under Rajoir upazila of Madaripur. His father was Panchanan Roychowdhury and his mother was Sukhda Sundari Devi. Father Panchanan Roychowdhury was an honorary magistrate in Madaripur town. Chittapriya Roychowdhury became a revolutionary member of the Madaripur Samiti (1910 AD), first at Khalia High School and later at Madaripur High School. Inspired by Manoranjan Sengupta Ray Chaudhuri became a member of Madaripur Samiti, a secret unit of Jugantar. He was arrested as an accused in the first Faridpur conspiracy case in December 1913 and spent five months in jail. On his release from jail, on 16 February 1915, on the convocation day of Calcutta University, he killed Suresh Mukherjee, a police inspector on duty on the streets, with the help of some colleagues. As a colleague of the revolutionary Jatin Mukherjee, he tried to import arms from Germany, Japan, America and the Dutch Indies. He attached with senior Bengali revolutionary Jatindranath Mukherjee alias Bagha Jatin in Christmas Day Plot for procuring arms from Germany, Japan, America. Ray Chaudhuri, Manoranjan Sengupta, Niren Dasgupta and Jyotishchandra Pal went to Balasore, Orissa with their leader Jatindranath Mukherjee to take delivery of arms from a German ship Maverick.

== Death ==
Police raided their hideout and found a clue which led them to Kaptipada village, Balasore district where they were staying. On 9 September 1915 Police had declared them as bandits and chased them. Ray Chaudhuri and others requested Jatindranath to leave and go to safe place but Jatin refused and all of them decided to fight beside the bank of Buribalam river. After seventy-five minutes gunfight Ray Chaudhuri received a bullet wound and died that day.
