= Raja Ram Temple =

Temple in Madaripur, Bangladesh

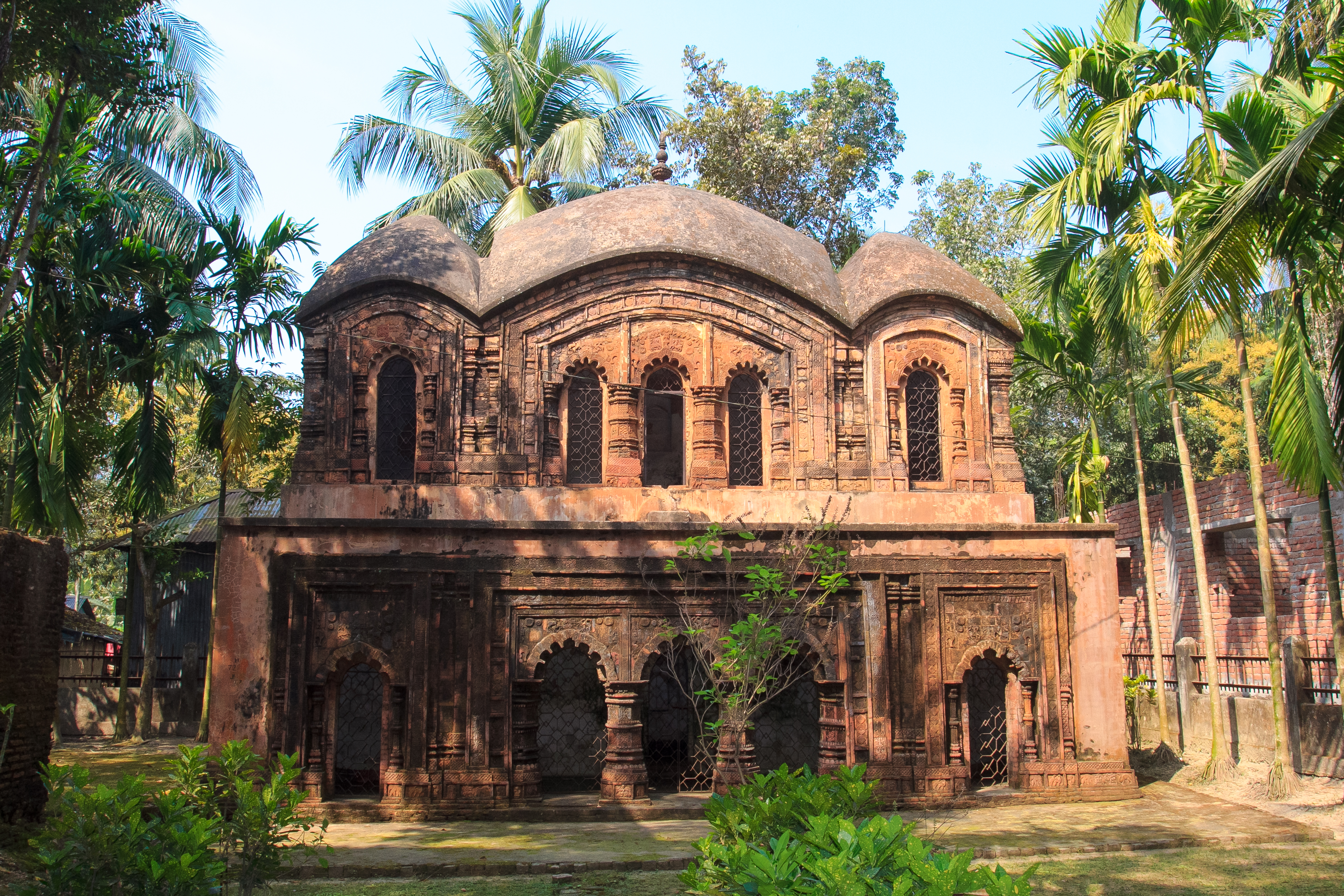

- Location within Bangladesh

Religion
- Affiliation: Hinduism
- District: Madaripur
- Deity: Gopinath
- Governing body: Department of Archaeology

Location
- Location: Khaliya, Rajoir Upazila
- Municipality: Madaripur
- Country: Bangladesh
- Interactive map of Raja Ram Temple
- Coordinates: 23°13′25.05″N 90°0′19.0″E

Architecture
- Type: Bengal temple architecture
- Founder: Rajaram Rai
- Funded by: Rajaram Rai
- Completed: 1825
- Height (max): 47 feet (14 m)

Raja Ram Temple (also known as Jora Bangla Temple) is a Hindu temple of Madaripur District, Bangladesh. The temple is located in Khalia village of Rajoir Upazila. It was built in the seventeenth century by the Khaliar landlord Rajaram Rai. The front of the temple was covered with terracotta tiles decorated with scenes of the Ramayana-Mahabharata.

== History ==
The Rajaram Temple was built in the 17th century in this region by Rajaram Rai Chowdhury, a devotee of the goddess Kali and a member of the then Khaliya Zamindar family. Although the zamindar spent a large sum of money on its construction, the exact date of completion is unknown. However, many believe it was built around the year 1825. The temple was named ‘Rajaram Temple’ after the zamindar Rajaram himself.

== Description ==
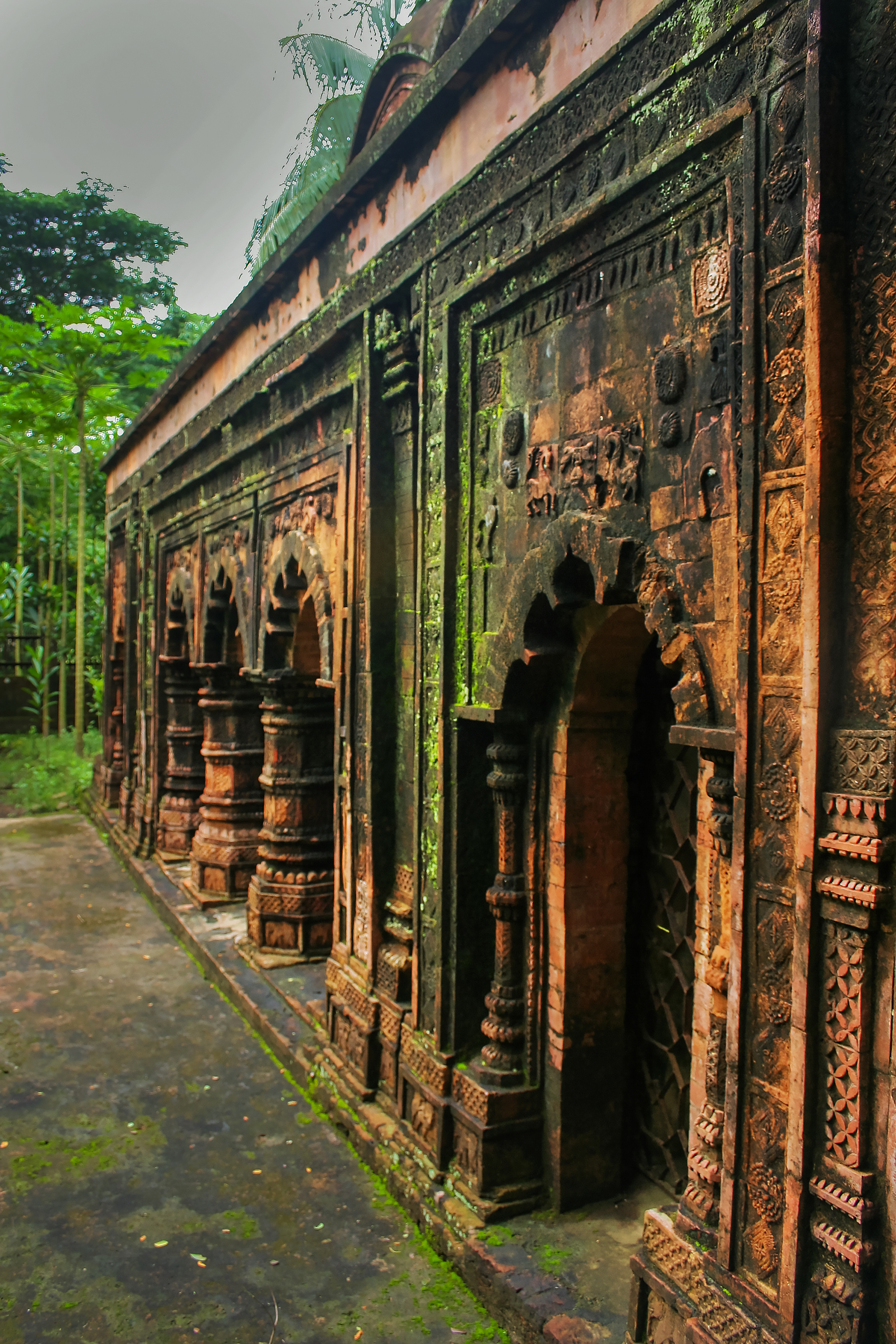
Corner view of the temple

The entire temple is built in a rural style, occupying 23 percent of the site. The temple has a kitchen and a total of nine rooms, three of which are on the ground floor and six on the upper floor. The complex also has a separate place for worship. The height of the temple is 14.33 metres (47.0 ft), and its length and width are 6.1 metres (20 ft) and 4.88 metres (16.0 ft), respectively. Each wall of this two-story temple is painted with various deities and scenes from the Ramayana and the Mahabharata. Much of the ground floor of this temple is now buried underground. It is now under the protection of the Department of Archaeology of Bangladesh.

Views of the temple
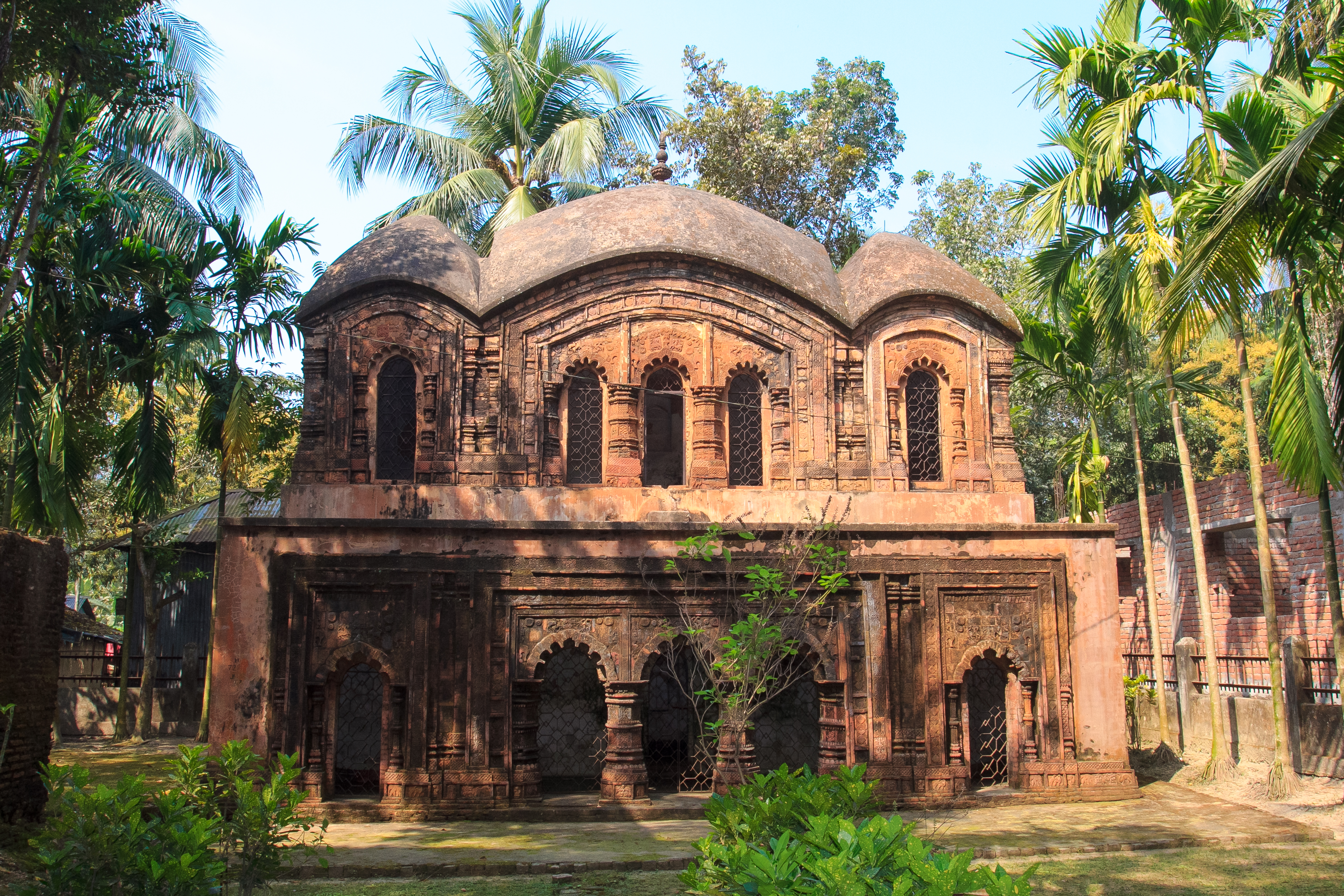
Front view of the temple

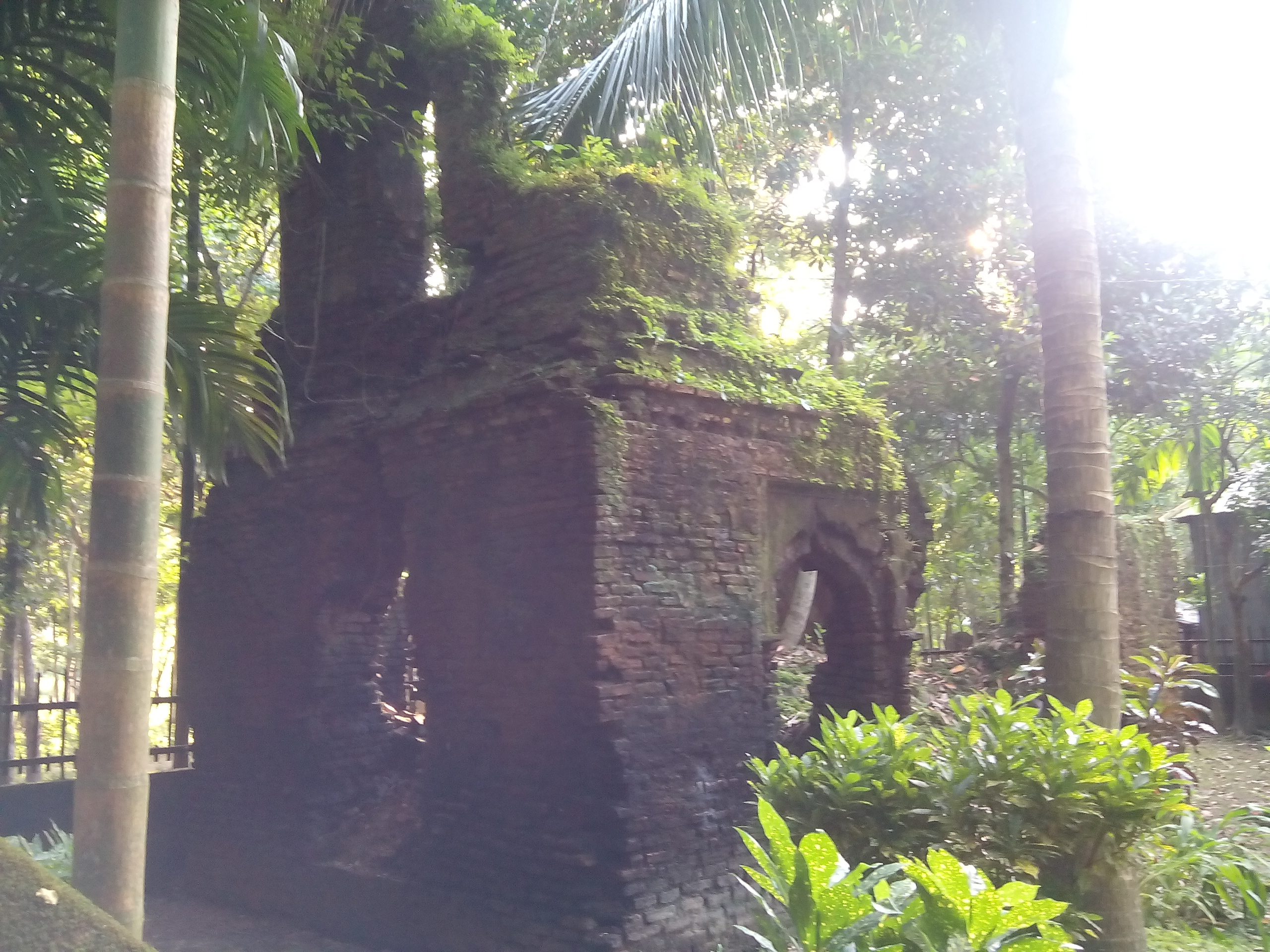
A ruined part of the temple

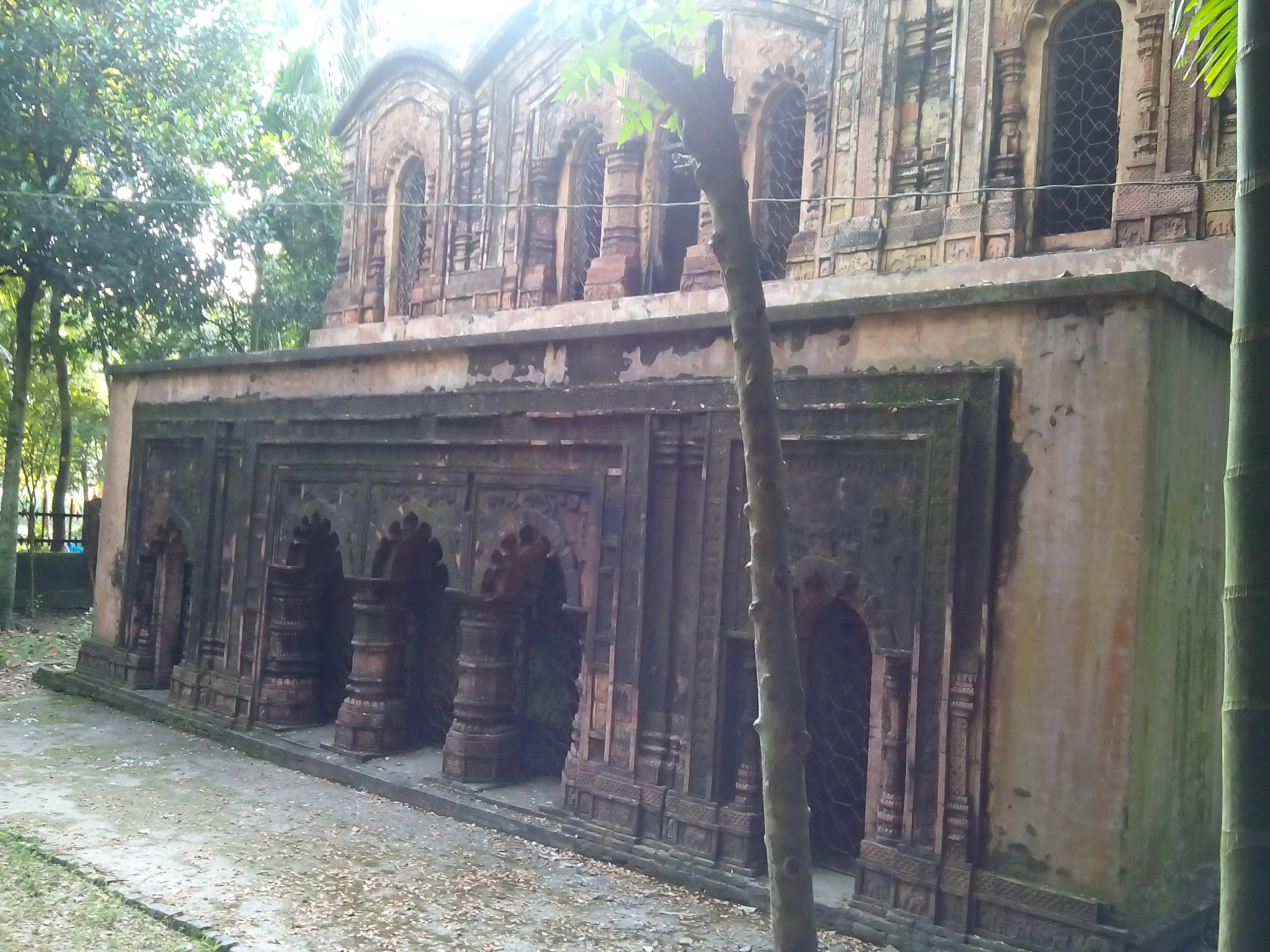
Corner view of the temple

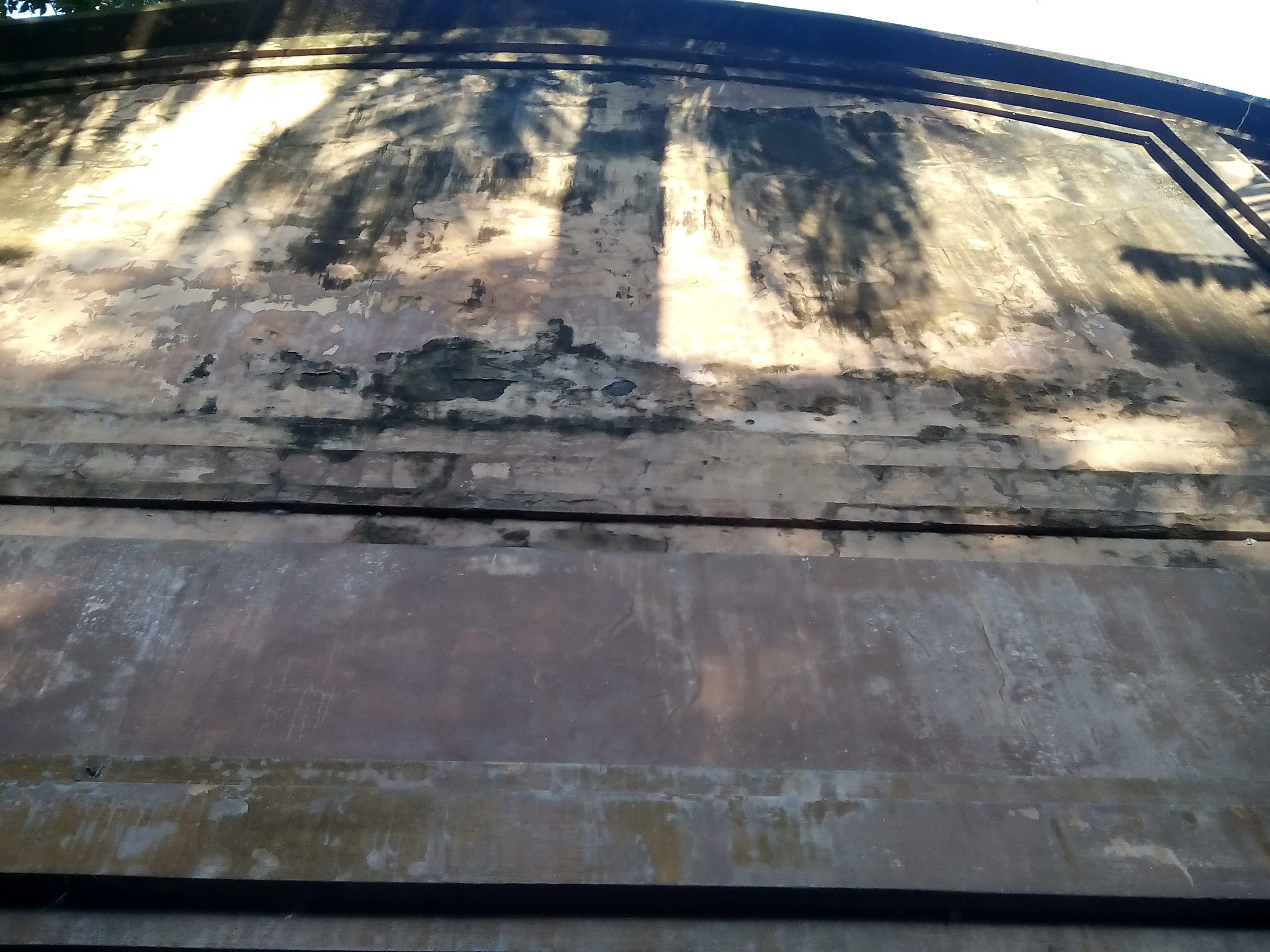
Rear view of the temple

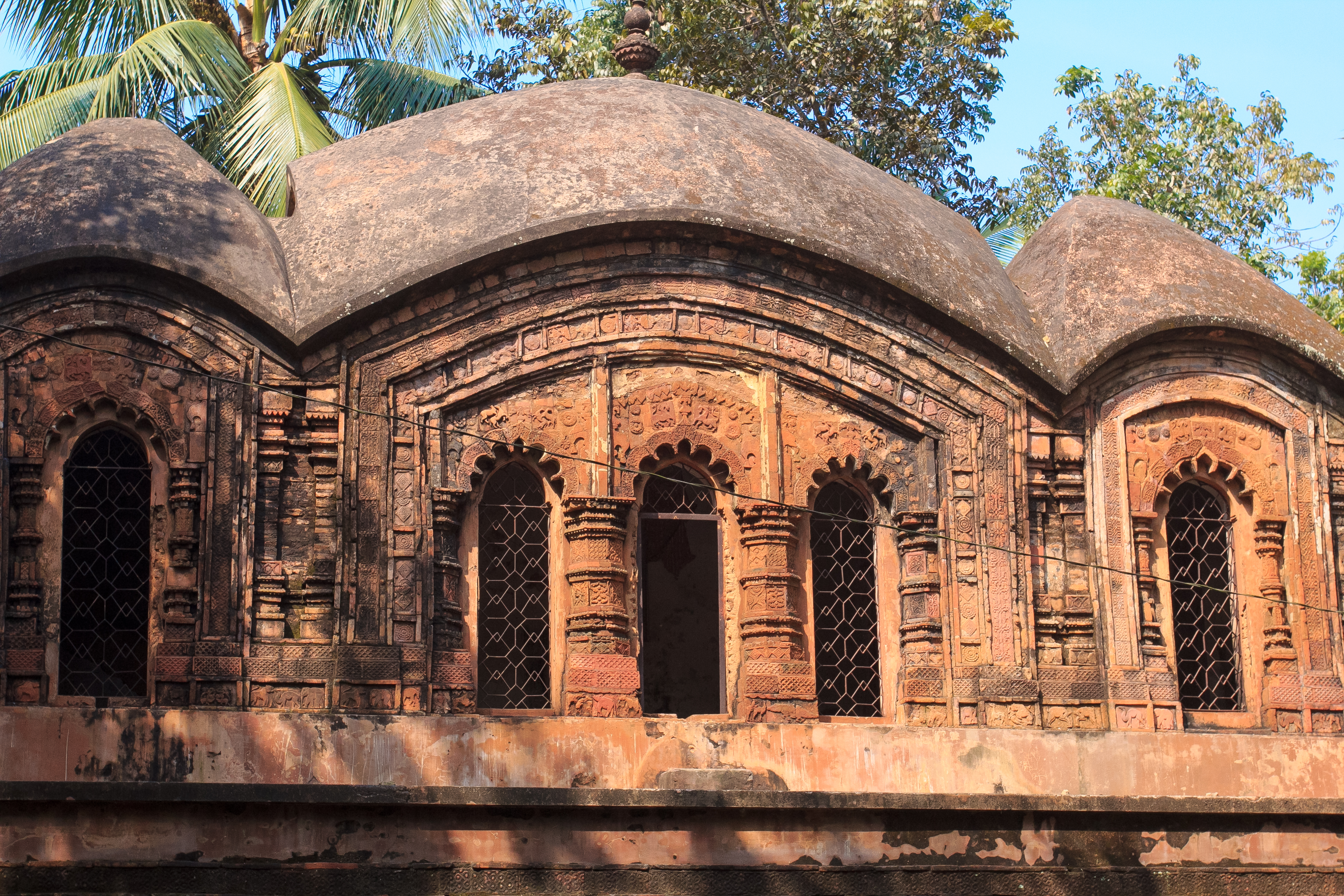
View of the upper part of the temple with a double-sloped roof

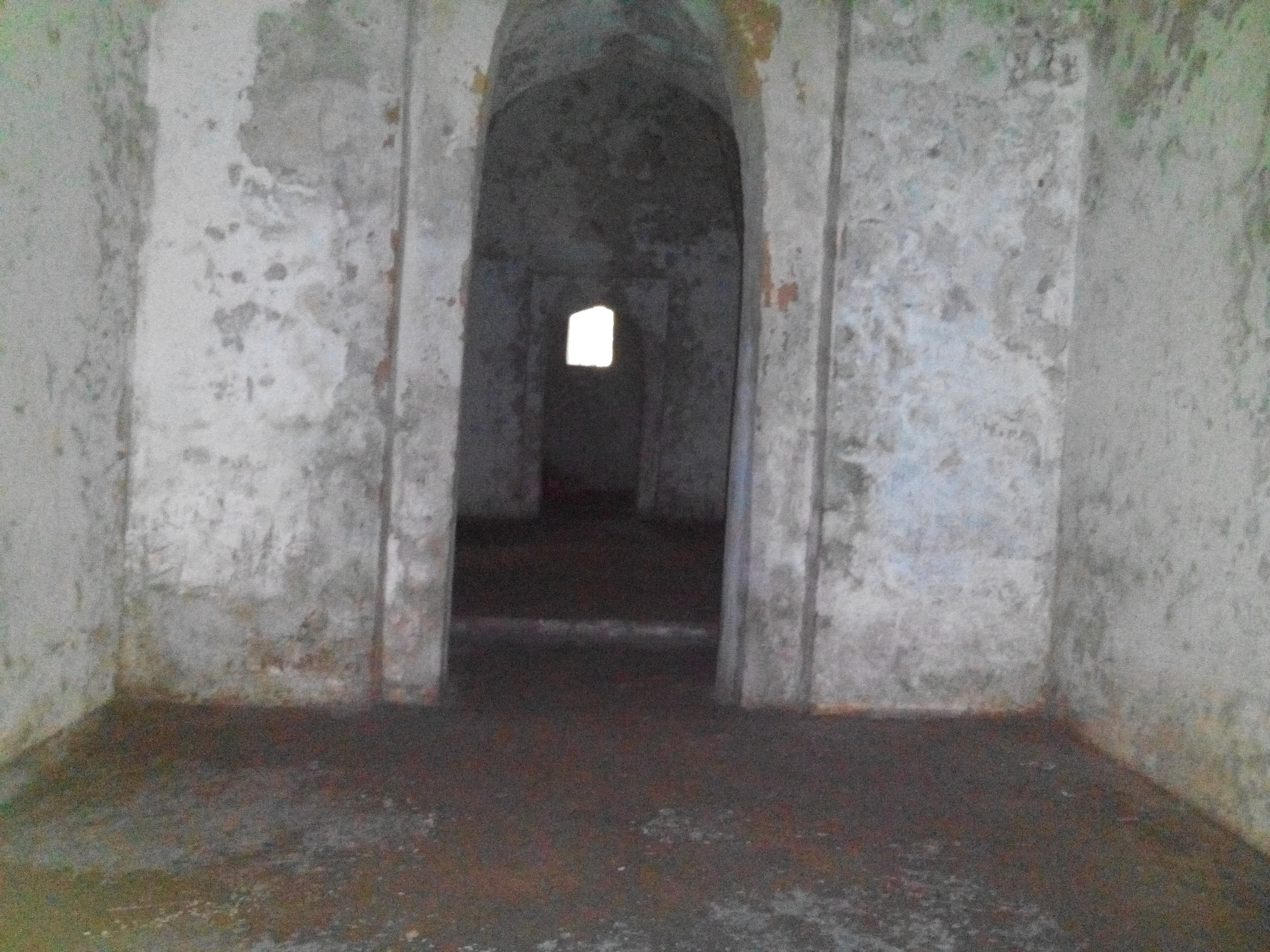
Interior view of the temple

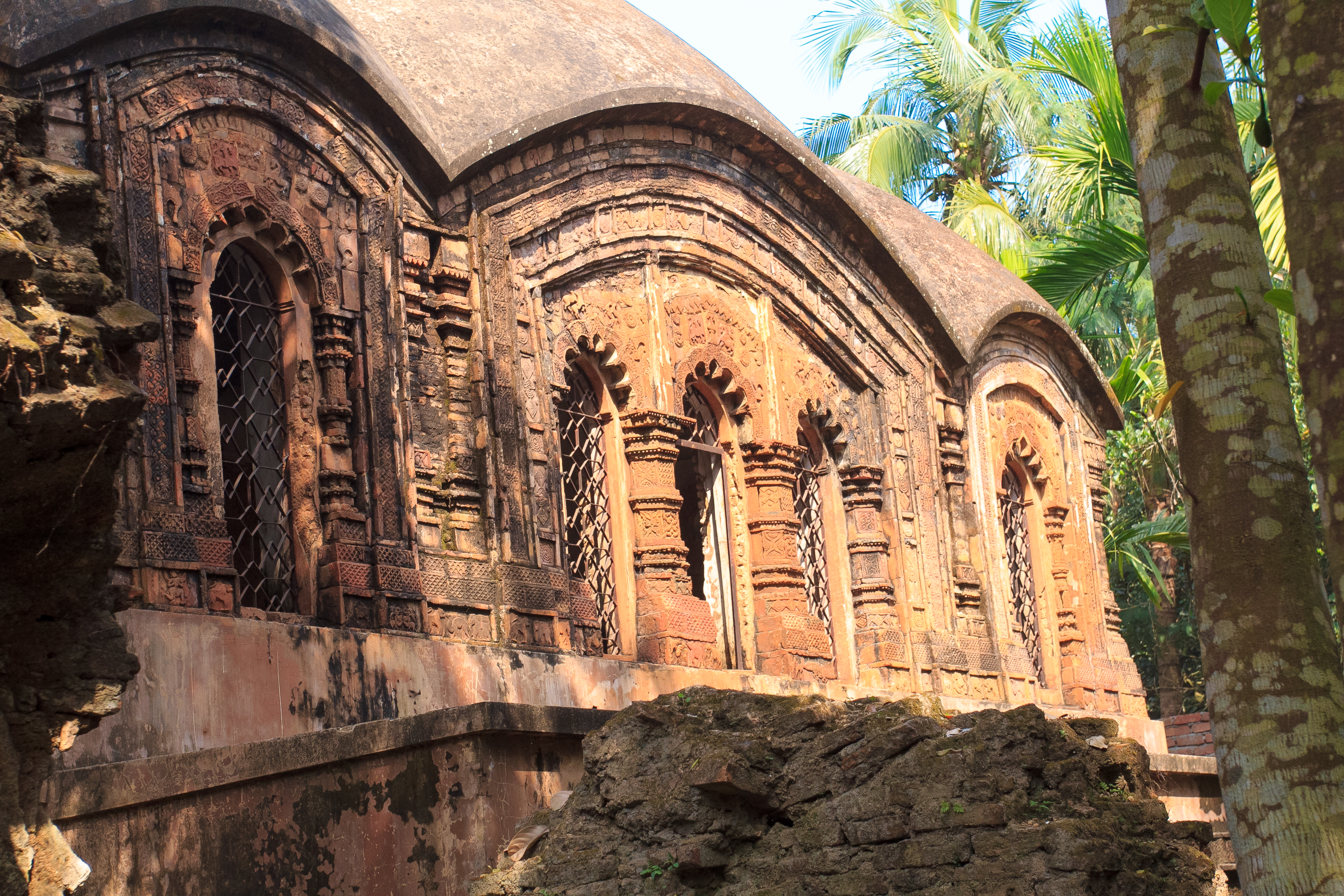
Upper corner view of the temple

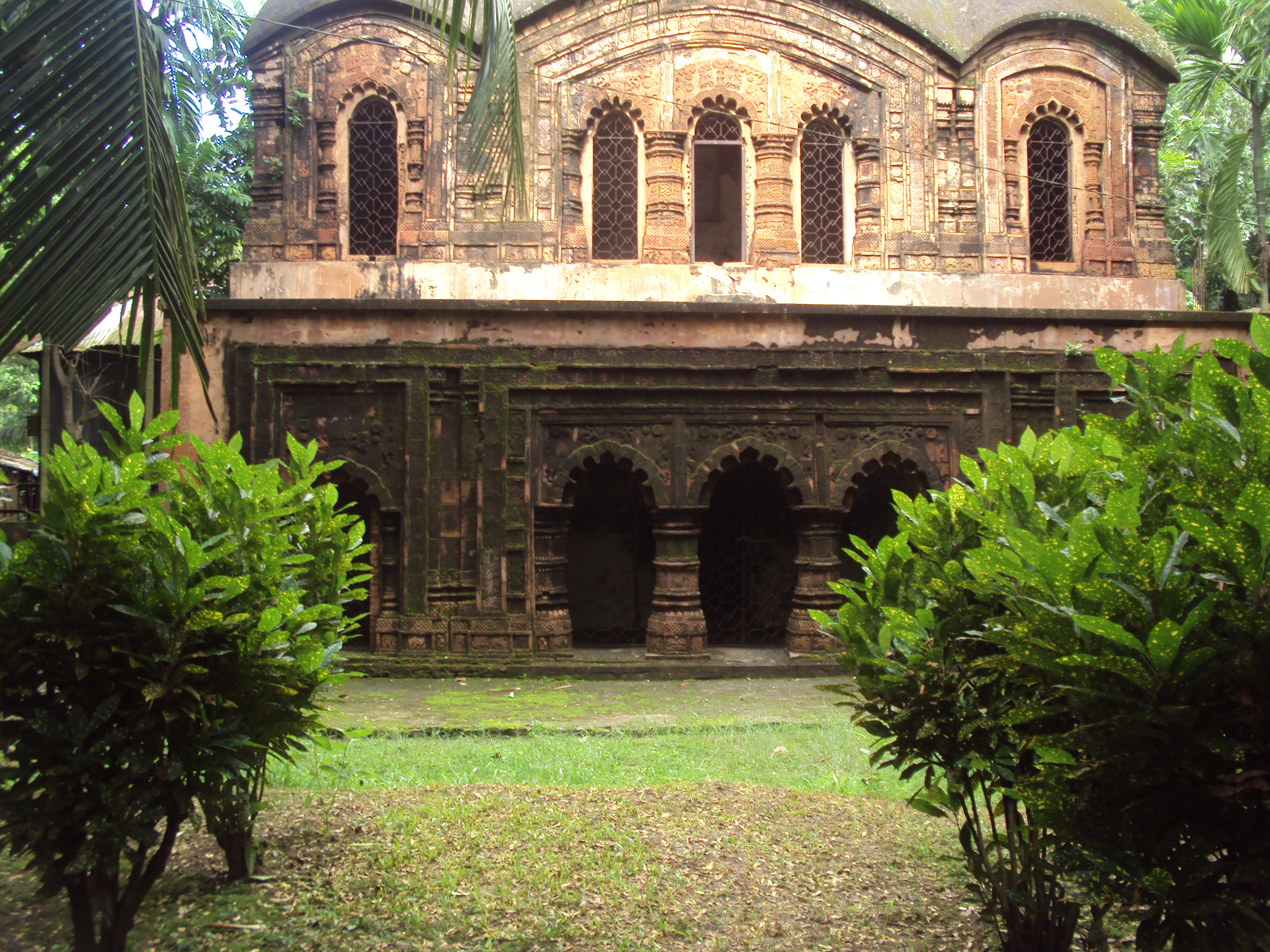
