= Kalkini Upazila =

Kalkini কালকিনি
- Upazila
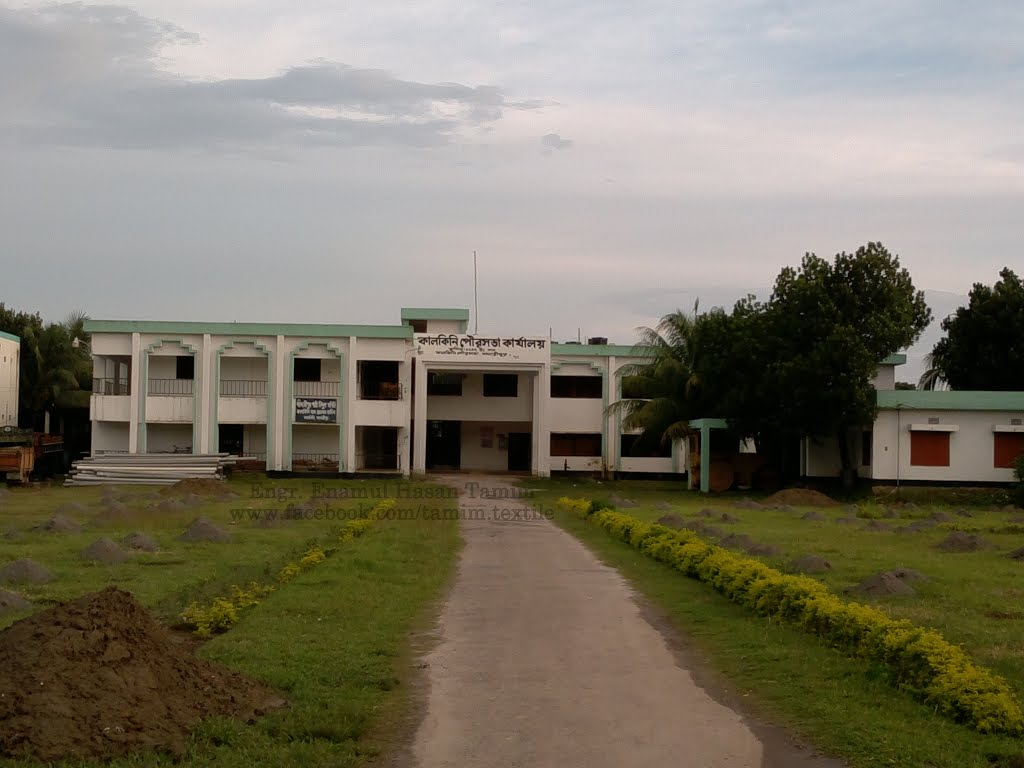
- Kalkini Pourashava building

- Coordinates: 23°4′N 90°14.5′E
- Country: Bangladesh
- Division: Dhaka
- District: Madaripur
- Parliamentary Constituency: Madaripur-3

Area
  - Upazila: 204.28 km^{2} (78.87 sq mi)
  - Metro: 27 km^{2} (10 sq mi)

Population (2022)
  - Upazila: 218,330
  - Density: 1,068.8/km^{2} (2,768.1/sq mi)
  - Metro: 48,865
  - Metro density: 1,800/km^{2} (4,700/sq mi)
- Time zone: UTC+6 (BST)
- Postal Code: 7920
- Area code: 06622
- Website: http://kalkini.madaripur.gov.bd

Kalkini Upazila mauza geocode map

Kalkini (Bengali: কালকিনি) is an upazila of Madaripur District in the Division of Dhaka, Bangladesh.

== History ==
Kalkini Police Station was established in 1909 and it was turned into an upazila on 1 February 1984. Kalkini Municipality was established in 1997. The Dasar Police Station was declared on 2 March 2013, with a partial area of Kalkini Police Station. Earlier, the Dasar Union was divided into two units, Betwari and Dasar, and the Nabagram Union divided into two other unions, named Sasikar and Nabagram. A police inquiry center was established at Dasar on 2 February 2012, with a total of six unions, including Gopalpur and Kazibakai unions.

== Geography ==
Kalkini is located in between 23°00' and 23°10' North latitudes and in between 90°06' and 90°21' East longitudes. It has total area 204.28 km^{2}. It is bounded by Madaripur Sadar Upazila on the north, Gaurnadi Upazila on the south, Gosairhat Upazila on the east, Kotalipara Upazila on the west.

== Demographics ==
Religions in residual Kalkini Upazila (2022)
Religion	Percent
Islam	94.93%
Hinduism	5.06%
Other or not stated	0.01%

According to the 2022 Bangladeshi census, Kalkini Upazila had 53,603 households and a population of 218,330. 10.34% of the population were under 5 years of age. Kalkini had a literacy rate (age 7 and over) of 74.28%: 75.50% for males and 73.25% for females, and a sex ratio of 87.87 males for every 100 females. 56,976 (26.10%) lived in urban areas.

According to the 2011 Census of Bangladesh, residual Kalkini Upazila had 43,716 households and a population of 201,764. 51,505 (25.53%) were under 10 years of age. Kalkini had a literacy rate (age 7 and over) of 47.23%, compared to the national average of 51.8%, and a sex ratio of 1065 females per 1000 males. 41,608 (20.62%) lived in urban areas.

== Points of interest ==
- Senapati Dighi - Baligram
- Three domed Mosque of Miabari - Gopalpur
- Amirabad Moth - Gopalpur.

== Administration ==
Kalkini Upazila is divided into Kalkini Municipality and 9 union parishads: Alinagar, Banshgari, Char Daulatkhan, Enayet Nagar, Kayaria, Lakshmipur, Ramjanpur, Sahebrampur, and Shikar Mangol. The union parishads are subdivided into 160 mauzas and 171 villages.

Kalkini Municipality is subdivided into 9 wards and 38 mahallas.

=== Police stations ===
- Kalkini Police Station
- Dasar Police Station

== Education ==
Kalkini has an average literacy rate of 47%; Male constitutes 50% and Female 46.2%.

=== Noted educational institutions ===
- Government Sheikh Hasina Academy and Women's College (1995)
- Kalkini Syed Abul Hossain University College (1972)
- Kalkini Syed Abul Hossain Academy (1983)
- Sahebrampur Kabi Nazrul Islam College (1972)
- Shahid Smriti College, Shashikar (1973)
- Kalkini Govt. Pilot Model High School (1946)
- Kalinagar High School (1904)
- Mahishmari Girls' High School (1918)
- Bir Mohan High School (1919)
- Nabagram High School (1943)
- Shashikar High School (1943)
- Sahebrampur Multilateral High School (1946)
- Khaser Hat High School (1960)
- Samitir Hat High School (1964)
- Gopalpur High School (1970)
- Snanghata High School (1970)
- Darsana High School (1973)
- Shashikar Girls' High School (1982)

== Notable residents ==
- Zohra Begum Kazi
- Sunil Gangopadhyay
- Syed Abul Hossain
- Mohammad Asaduzzaman
- Abdus Sobhan Golap
- Syeda Rubaiyat Hossain
- Engr. M.A. Mannan education & social works

== See also ==
- Upazilas of Bangladesh
- Dhaka Division
- Madaripur District
