= Madaripur Sadar Upazila =

Madaripur Sadar মাদারিপুর সদর
- Upazila
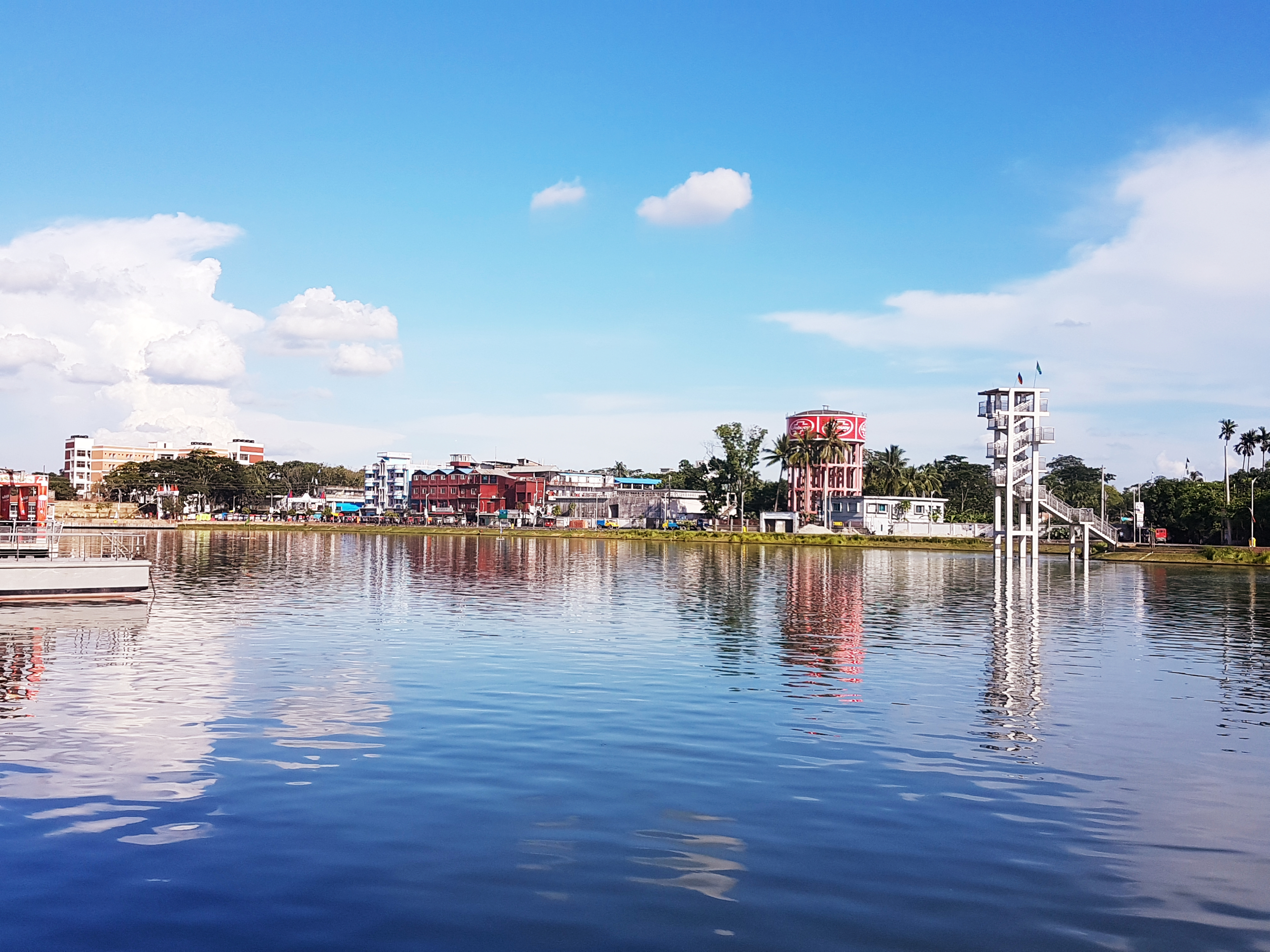
- Shakuni Lake in Madaripur

- Coordinates: 23°10′N 90°12.5′E
- Country: Bangladesh
- Division: Dhaka
- District: Madaripur
- Established: 1776
- Headquarters: Madaripur

Area
  - Upazila: 283.14 km^{2} (109.32 sq mi)
  - Urban: 13.99 km^{2} (5.40 sq mi)

Population (2022)
  - Upazila: 396,772
  - Density: 1,401.3/km^{2} (3,629.4/sq mi)
  - Urban: 88,743
  - Urban density: 6,343/km^{2} (16,430/sq mi)
- Time zone: UTC+6 (BST)
- Postal code: 7900
- Area code: 0661
- Website: sadar.madaripur.gov.bd

Madaripur Sadar Upazila mauza geocode map

Madaripur Sadar (Bengali: মাদারিপুর সদর) is an upazila of Madaripur District in Dhaka Division, Bangladesh.

== Geography ==
Madaripur Sadar is located at 23.1667°N 90.2083°E. It has 74,451 households and total area 283.14 km^{2}. It is bounded by Shibchar and Zanjira Upazilas on the north, Kalkini and Kotalipara Upazilas on the south, Shariatpur Sadar Upazila on the east, Rajoir Upazila on the west.

== Demographics ==
Religions in Madaripur Sadar Upazila (2022)
Religion	Percent
Islam	93.18%
Hinduism	6.80%
Other or not stated	0.02%

According to the 2022 Bangladeshi census, Madaripur Sadar Upazila had 96,766 households and a population of 396,772. 9.87% of the population were under 5 years of age. Madaripur Sadar had a literacy rate (age 7 and over) of 75.73%: 77.58% for males and 74.13% for females, and a sex ratio of 88.90 males for every 100 females. 120,029 (30.25%) lived in urban areas.

According to the 2011 Census of Bangladesh, Madaripur Sadar Upazila had 74,451 households and a population of 345,764. 81,963 (23.70%) were under 10 years of age. Madaripur Sadar had a literacy rate (age 7 and over) of 51.10%, compared to the national average of 51.8%, and a sex ratio of 1018 females per 1000 males. 62,690 (18.13%) lived in urban areas.

== Points of interest ==
- Shah Madar (RA) Dargah Sharif,
- Algi Kazibari Mosque - Bahadurpur,
- Jhaoudi Giri - Jhaoudi,
- Auliapur Neelkuthi - Chilarchar,
- Mithapur Zamindar Bari - Mithapur
- Mather Bazaar Math - Khoajpur,
- Parboter Bagan - Mastofapur,
- Madaripur Shakuni Lake,
- Charmuguria Bandar,
- Narayan Mandir - Panichatra,
- Kulpadi Zamindar Bari and Weather office.

== Administration ==
Madaripur Sadar Upazila is divided into Madaripur Municipality and 15 union parishads: Bahadurpur, Chilar Char, Dhurail, Dudkhali, Ghatmajhi, Jhaudi, Kalikapur, Kendua, Khoajpur, Kunia, Mustafapur, Panchkhola, Pearpur, Rasti, and Sirkhara. The union parishads are subdivided into 159 mauzas and 185 villages.

Madaripur Municipality is subdivided into 9 wards and 34 mahallas.

== Education ==
Currently there are no full-fledged public or private universities and only a few colleges affiliated with the national university.

Literacy rate and educational institutions: Average literacy 51.1%; male 53.9%, female 48.4%. Noted educational institutions:

- Madaripur Government College (1948)
- Charmuguria College (1978)
- Government Sufiya Mahila College (1984)
- Syed Abul Hossain College (1989)
- Donovan Government Girls' High School (1914)
- United Islamia Government High School (1950) [formerly Madaripur High School (1885)]
- Madaripur Public Institution (1953)
- Mithapur LS High School (1915)
- Charmuguria Merchants High School (1931)
- Tantibari Islamia High School (1954)
- AC North Kalagachhia High School' (1961)
- Ghatokchar Multilateral High School (1963)
- Bahadurpur High School' (1968)
- Julio Kuri High School (1972)
- Charnachana Fazil Madrasa (1912)

== Notable residents ==
- Shah Madar
- Basudeb Dasgupta
- Ava Alam
- Ashim Saha
- Shajahan Khan
- AFM Bahauddin Nasim
- Mohammad Nizamuddin Ahmed
- Nargis Akhter

== See also ==
- Upazilas of Bangladesh
- Madaripur District
- Dhaka Division
