= Madaripur District =

Madaripur District মাদারীপুর জেলা
- District of Bangladesh
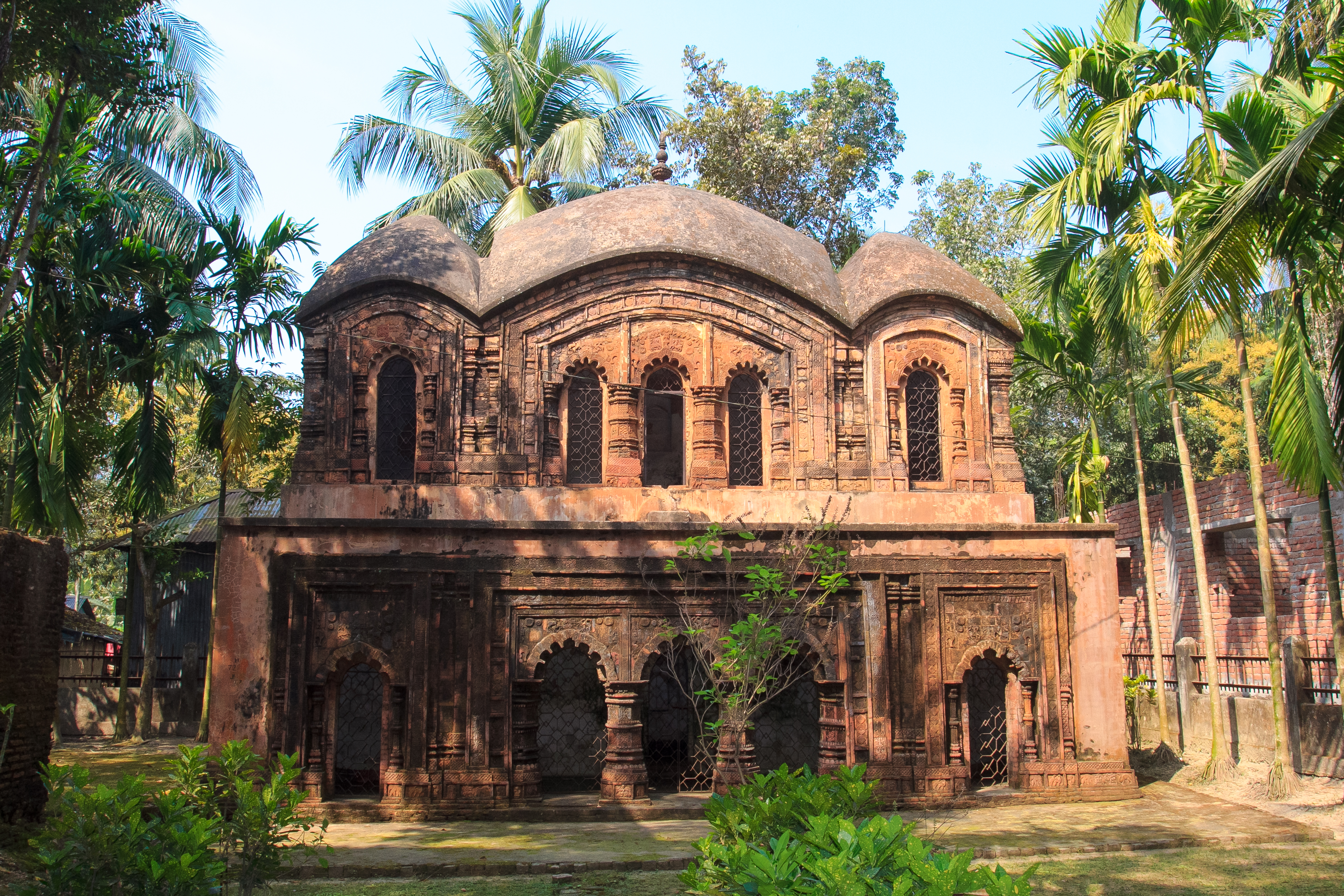
- Madaripur Raja Ram Temple

- Location of Madaripur District in Bangladesh
- Interactive map of Madaripur District
- Coordinates: 23.17°N 90.10°E
- Country: Bangladesh
- Division: Dhaka
- Established: 1854
- Named for: Sufi Syed Madar
- Headquarters: Madaripur

Government
  - Deputy Commissioner: Mohammad Marufur Rashid Khan
  - District Council Chairman: Munir Chowdhury

Area
  - District of Bangladesh: 1,125.69 km^{2} (434.63 sq mi)

Population (2022)
  - District of Bangladesh: 1,293,027
  - Density: 1,148.65/km^{2} (2,975.00/sq mi)
  - Urban: 315,471
- Demonym: Madaripuira
- Time zone: UTC+06:00 (BST)
- Postal code: 7900
- Area code: 0661
- Geocode: BD.DA.MD
- ISO 3166 code: BD-36
- HDI (2018): 0.649 medium · 3rd of 21
- Website: www.madaripur.gov.bd

Madaripur District (Bengali: মাদারীপুর জেলা) is a district in central Bangladesh and a part of the Dhaka Division.

== History ==
Madaripur subdivision was established in 1854 within Bakerganj district. In 1873, it was separated from Bakerganj and annexed to Faridpur district. Madaripur subdivision was turned into a district in 1984. Madaripur district was named after the Sufi saint Sayed Badiuddin Ahmed Zinda Shah Madar (d. 1434 CE).

== Administrative areas ==
Madaripur district has 3 parliamentary seats, 5 Upazilas, 5 police stations, 4 municipalities, 59 union parishads, 1,062 villages and 479 Mouzas.

=== Parliamentary seats ===
1. Madaripur-1
2. Madaripur-2
3. Madaripur-3

=== Upazilas and Thanas ===
Madaripur District upazila geocode map

Madaripur is divided into 5 Upazilas:

1. Madaripur Sadar
2. Kalkini
3. Rajoir
4. Shibchar
5. Dasar

=== Municipalities ===
- Madaripur Municipality
- Kalkini Municipality
- Rajoir Municipality
- Shibchar Municipality
- None

== Demographics ==
Historical population
Year	Pop.	±% p.a.
1974	807,404	—
1981	943,126	+2.24%
1991	1,069,176	+1.26%
2001	1,146,349	+0.70%
2011	1,165,952	+0.17%
2022	1,293,027	+0.94%

According to the 2022 Census of Bangladesh, Madaripur District had 313,273 households and a population of 1,293,027 with an average 4.06 people per household. Among the population, 254,175 (19.66%) inhabitants were under 10 years of age. The population density was 1,149 people per km^{2}. Madaripur District had a literacy rate (age 7 and over) of 74.93%, compared to the national average of 74.80%, and a sex ratio of 1100 females per 1000 males. Approximately, 24.40% of the population lived in urban areas. The ethnic population was 508.

Religions in Madaripur District (2022)
Religion	Percent
Islam	88.68%
Hinduism	11.21%
Other or not stated	0.11%

Religion in present-day Madaripur District (Note: Madaripur, Rajair, Kalkini and Sibchar thanas of Faridpur district)
Religion	1941		1981		1991		2001		2011		2022	
Religion	Pop.	%	Pop.	%	Pop.	%	Pop.	%	Pop.	%		
Islam	442,755	70.49%	795,679	84.37%	916,021	85.68%	1,001,316	87.35%	1,023,702	87.80%	1,146,678	88.68%
Hinduism	184,309	29.34%	145,795	15.50%	146,669	13.72%	143,093	12.48%	141,097	12.10%	144,904	11.21%
Others (Note: Including Jainism, Christianity, Buddhism, Zoroastrianism, Judaism, Ad-Dharmis, or not stated)	1,047	0.17%	1,652	0.13%	6,486	0.60%	1,940	0.17%	1,153	0.10%	1,445	0.11%
Total Population	628,111	100%	943,126	100%	1,069,176	100%	1,146,349	100%	1,165,952	100%	1,293,027	100%

Muslims make up 88.68% of the population, while Hindus are 11.21%. The Hindu population has decreased from 1991 to 2011, and grew much slower than the Muslim population from 2011 to 2022. There is a small minority of 1,300 Christians in the district.

== Administration ==
- Administrator of District Council: Munir Chowdhury
- Deputy Commissioner & District Magistrate (DC): Mohammad Marufur Rashid Khan

== Education ==
The total number of educational institutions in Madaripur District is 213.

- Colleges: 21
- Boheratola Mohila College
- Borhamganj Government College
- Government Sufia Mohila College
- Madaripur Govt College
- Nurul Amin University College
- Shekh Hasina Women's Degree College
- Shibchar Nandokumar High School and College
- Syed Abul Hossain University College, Kalkini, Madaripur
- Secondary school: 138
  1. Charmugaria Merchants High School
  2. Panchkhola Muktisena High School
  3. Tatibari Islamia High school
  4. Kalikapur High School
  5. Ishibpur High School
  6. Krokchar High School
  7. Hossenpur High School
  8. Birmohon High School
  9. Algi High School
  10. G.C. Academy
  11. Madaripur Public High School
  12. Shohid Baccu High School
  13. Shamsun Nahar Bhuiyan Girls High School
  14. Kulpoddi High School
  15. Khatia High School
  16. Panchar High School
  17. Madborerchar High School
  18. Bakhorerkandi High School
  19. Dr. Saleha Selim High School
  20. United Islamia Government High School
  21. Don-van Government Girls High School
- Madrasa: 69
  1. Shatbaria Nur-E- Mohammad(s) Dakhil Madrasha
  2. Purbohosnabad Hatemia Dakhil Madrasah
  3. Mithapur Nurani Madrasha
  4. Chorgobindopur Alim Madrasha
  5. Uttar Chorgobindopur Mia Dakhil Madrasha
  6. Madaripur Ahmodia Kamil Madrasha
  7. Bahadurpur Shariatia Alia Kamil (MA) Madrasah
  8. Asapat Dakhil Madrasha

== Notable residents ==
- Shah Madar
- Moulavi Asmat Ali Khan
- Shajahan Khan
- Mohammad Nizamuddin Ahmed
- Alaol
- Mohammad Asaduzzaman
- Haji Shariatullah
- Mohsin Uddin Dudu Mia
- Awa Khaled Rashid Uddin Ahmad
- Ambica Charan Mazumdar
- AFM Bahauddin Nasim
- Pulin Behari Das
- Chittapriya Ray Chaudhuri
- Panchanan Chakraborty
- Swami Pranavananda
- Gostha Pal
- Zohra Begum Kazi
- Phani Bhushan Majumder
- Fazlur Rahman Khan
- Padma Devi
- Sunil Gangopadhyay
- Basudeb Dasgupta
- Syed Abul Hossain
- A. B. M. Khairul Haque
- Ava Alam
- Nargis Akhter
- Gour Chandra Bala

== Rivers ==
There are about 10 rivers in Madaripur district. They are -

- Padma River
- Arial Khan River
- Kumar Upper River
- Kumar Lower River
- Visarkanda-Bagda River
- Torquee River
- Palrodi River
- Palang River
- Madaripur Beel Route River
- The Mayankata River

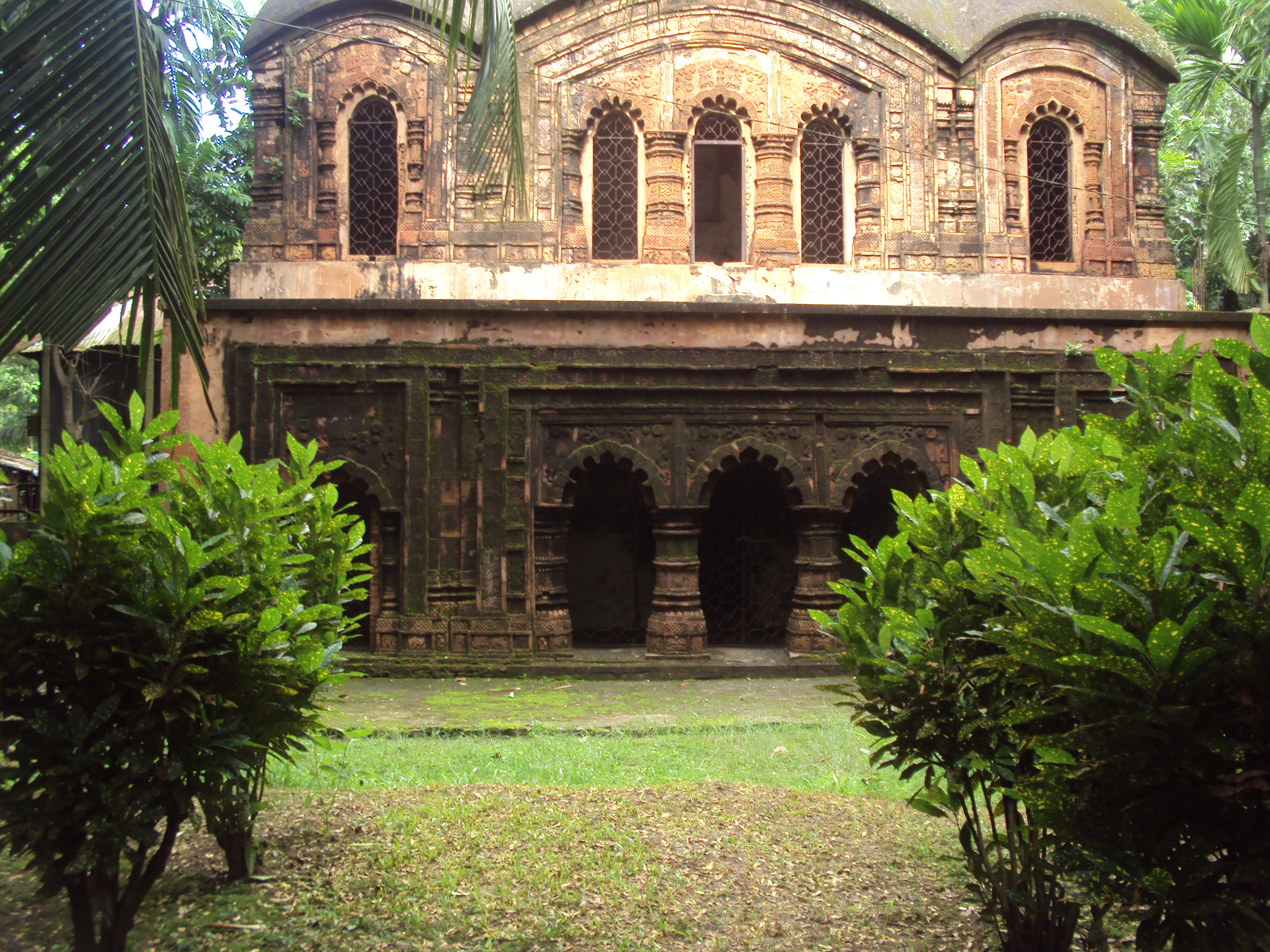
Raja Ram Mandir - Khalia

== Place of interest ==
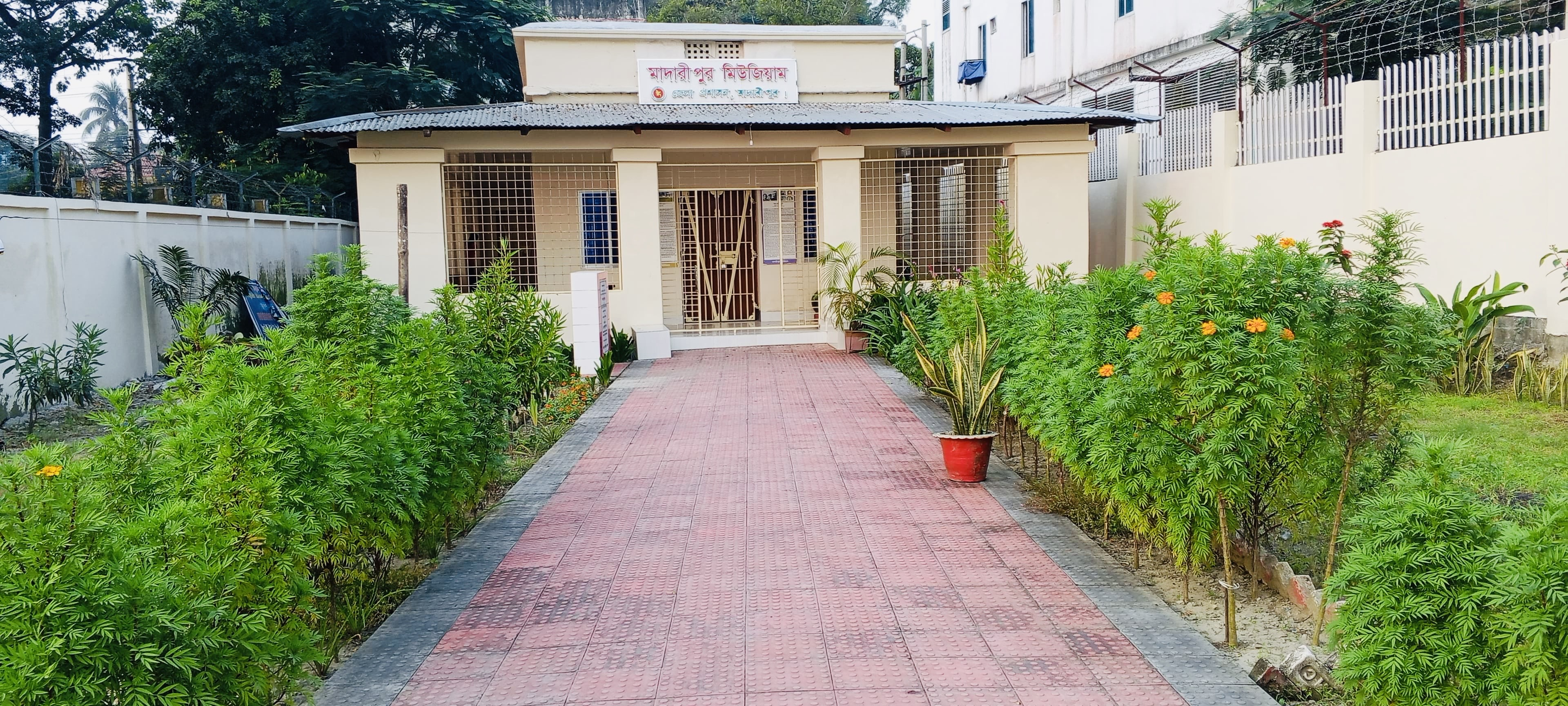
Madaripur Museum

- Shah Madar (RA) Dargah Sharif
- Madaripur Shokuni Lake
- Madaripur Museum
- The Shrine of Sufi Amir Shah (RA)
- Algi Kazibari Mosque - Bahadurpur
- Raja Ram Mandir - Khalia
- Jhaoudi Giri - Jhaoudi
- Auliapur Neelkuthi - Chilarchar
- Mithapur Zamindar Bari - Mithapur
- Pranab Math - Bajitpur
- Mather Bazaar Math - Khoajpur
- Khalia Shanti Kendra - Khalia
- Parboter Bagan - Mostofapur
- Senapati Dighi - Amaratola & Khatial
- Charmuguria Eco-Park
- Narayan Mandir - Panichatra
- Kulpadi Zamindar Bari and Weather office

== See also ==
- Dhaka Division
- Districts of Bangladesh
- Thanas of Bangladesh
