= Madaripur =

Madaripur মাদারীপুর
- Municipality
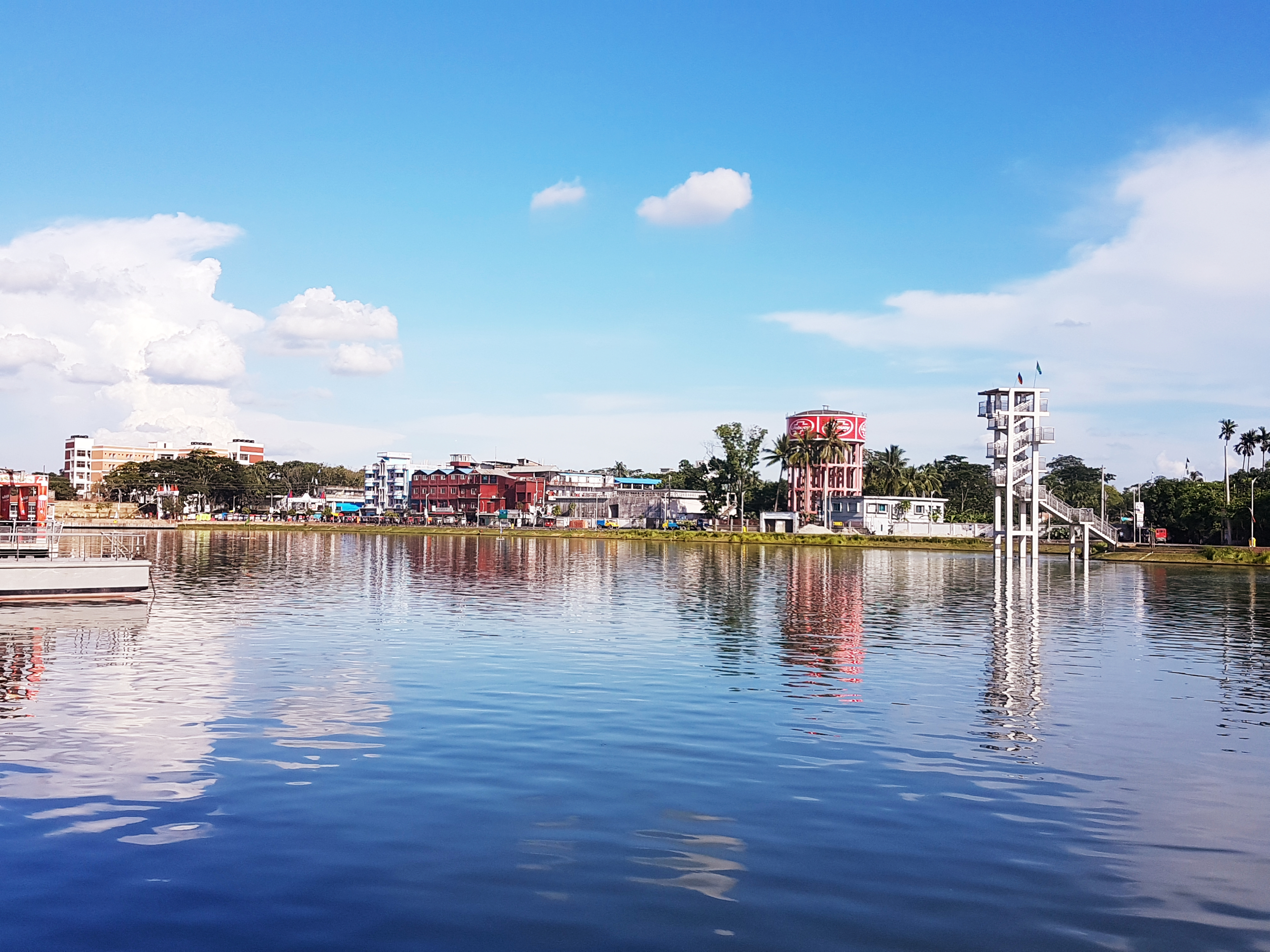
- Shakuni Lake in Madaripur

- Location within Dhaka division Location within Bangladesh
- Coordinates: 23°10′N 90°12.5′E
- Country: Bangladesh
- Division: Dhaka
- District: Madaripur
- Upazila: Madaripur Sadar
- Established: 1776

Area
  - Total: 14.22 km^{2} (5.49 sq mi)
- Time zone: UTC+6 (BST)
- Postal code: 7900
- Telephone area code: 0661
- Website: sadar.madaripur.gov.bd

Madaripur Municipality mahallah geocode map

Madaripur is a town in Dhaka Division in south-central Bangladesh. It is the headquarters of Madaripur District. It is named for Shah Madar, a Sufi saint who spread Islam in the region.

== History ==
Madaripur is a historically rich region. The district is named after the saint Hazrat Badruddin Shah Madar (R.A.), a practitioner from the 15th century. The history of Madaripur has traversed through various trials and tribulations since ancient times.

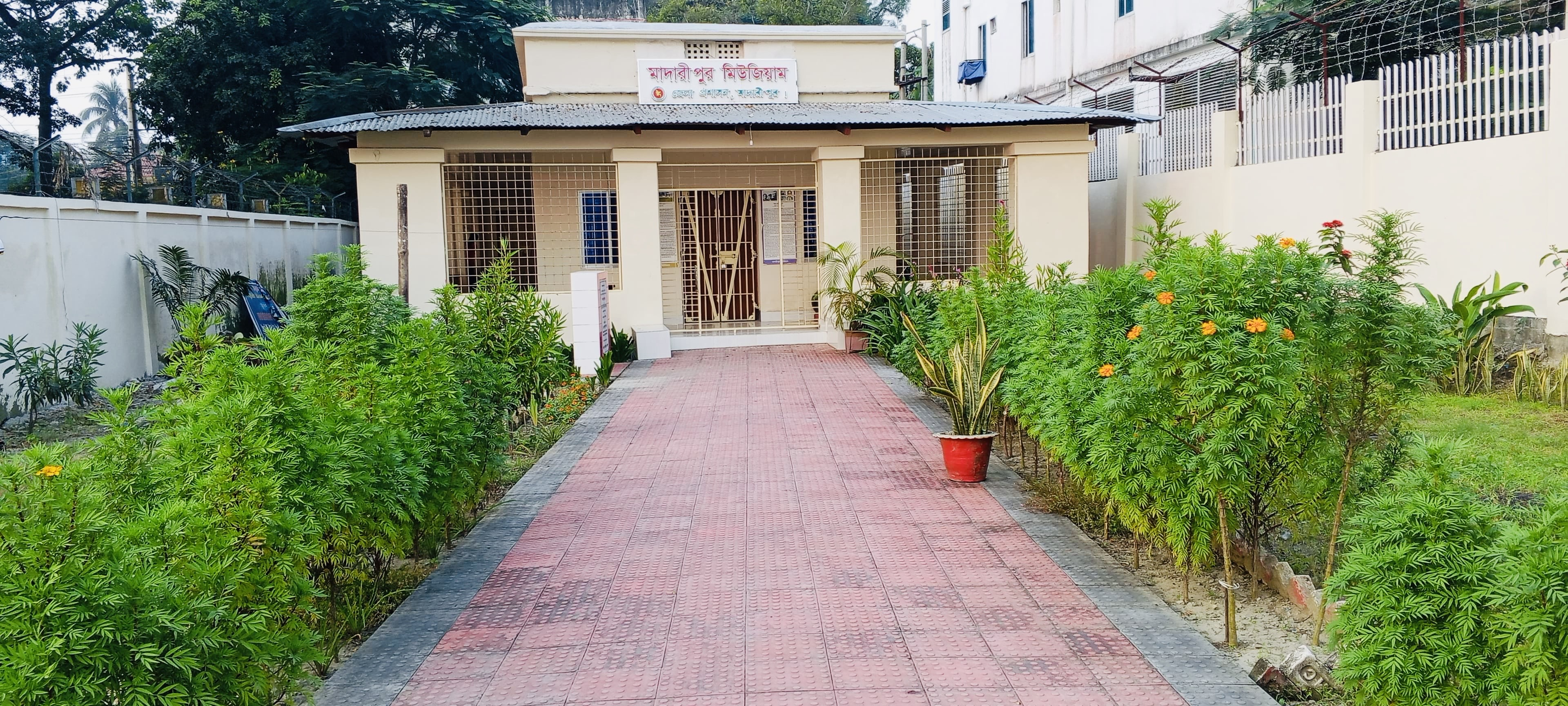
Madaripur Museum

=== From ancient times to before British rule ===
In ancient times, Madaripur was known as Idilpur. Idilpur was an advanced settlement of the Chandradweep Kingdom, and the administrative name of the region was Nabyamandal. Kotali Para was one of the centers of civilization in Bengal. In the 4th century CE, Idilpur and Kotali Para were famous for trade. During the invasion of Alexander the Great in 327 BCE, the Gangaridi people ruled independently in the Kotali Para region. After that, this area was under the rule of the Gupta dynasty (320-496 CE). After the death of the independent ruler Shashanka, Bengal's history was known as "Matsayan" for a hundred years (650-750 CE). In 750 CE, Gopal was elected as king. The Pala dynasty ruled Bengal from 750 to 1224 CE.

In the 10th and 11th centuries, the Chandravansh ruled independently in southeastern Bengal. The copper plates of Sri Chandra of the Chandravansh have been found in Idilpur and Kedarapur. Madaripur and Shariatpur were under the rule of the Chandravansh. The Sen dynasty ruled eastern Bengal from 1098 to 1225 CE. The copper plates of Bishwarup Sen in Kotali Para and Keshab Sen in Idilpur have been found. In ancient times, the eastern part of Madaripur was known as Idilpur and the western part as Kotali Para. After the fall of the Sen kings, the Chandradweep Kingdom was established. The districts of Barisal Division, including Madaripur, Shariatpur, Gopalganj, and Bagerhat, were under the Chandradweep Kingdom.

In the 14th century, it came under the rule of the Faridpur Sultans. From 1203 to 1575, the sultans ruled Bengal. However, the Sen dynasty ruled in eastern Bengal for almost a hundred years. Sultan Ruknuddin Barbak Shah (1459–1474) was the first to capture Faridpur-Chandradweep. Sultan Jalaluddin Fateh Shah (1481–1485) occupied part of Faridpur and Chandradweep and formed the Fatehabad pargana. The first historical name of Madaripur was Fatehabad. Sultan Hussain Shah (1493–1519) was a popular ruler of Fatehabad. From 1538 to 1563, Sher Shah and his descendants ruled Bengal. From 1564 to 1576, the Karrani dynasty ruled Bengal, and from 1576 to 1611, Bengal was under the Barbhuiyans. Among the Barbhuiyans were Chand Ray of Faridpur, Kedar Ray, and Ramchandra Ray of Bakla. Mughal and Nawabi rule continued until 1765, after which Bengal came under British control.

=== British era ===
The English rule in Bengal began with the fall of the last independent Nawab, Siraj-ud-Daulah, in 1757. Essentially, the British ruled Bengal for nearly two hundred years, from 1765 to 1947. Until 1854, Madaripur was known locally. In 1854, with the creation of subdivisions and police stations, the name 'Madaripur' received administrative recognition. During the British era, Madaripur was a land of various movements and struggles. The famous leader of the Faraizi movement, Haji Shariatullah (1781–1840), was born in Bahadurpur of Shibchar, Madaripur. From 1820 to 1850, he led movements against religious superstitions, indigo planters, and zamindars' oppression. After Shariatullah's death, his capable son Dudu Mia (1819–1962) took over the leadership of the Faraizi movement.

During the British era, the revolutionaries of Madaripur played a historic role in the independence movement of the subcontinent. The notable son of this district, Chittropriyo Ray Chowdhury, died in direct combat with the British forces in the 1915 Battle of Baleshwar. In this battle, Nirendra Nath Dasgupta and Manoranjan Sengupta were captured. The fiery figure of this district, Ambikacharan Majumdar, was the president of the All India Congress. He was also the architect of modern Faridpur. In 1947, Bengal was divided, becoming a province of Pakistan known as East Bengal.

=== Pakistani era (1947–1971) ===
After the creation of Pakistan in 1947, the hopes and dreams of the people of East Bengal began to gradually shatter. The reactionary ruling class of Pakistan attempted to consolidate their power by depriving the people of East Bengal of their rightful rights. The people of this land stood up against all forms of oppression and deprivation. The notable sons of Madaripur played a significant role in all movements, including the Language Movement of 1952, the United Front elections of 1954, the mass uprising of 1969, and, most importantly, the War of Independence in 1971.

== Climate ==
Climate data for Madaripur (1991–2020, extremes 1976-present)
Month	Jan	Feb	Mar	Apr	May	Jun	Jul	Aug	Sep	Oct	Nov	Dec	Year
Record high °C (°F)	30.8 (87.4)	35.0 (95.0)	40.0 (104.0)	39.6 (103.3)	38.3 (100.9)	39.5 (103.1)	39.5 (103.1)	36.4 (97.5)	36.5 (97.7)	36.2 (97.2)	34.7 (94.5)	31.0 (87.8)	40.0 (104.0)
Mean daily maximum °C (°F)	24.9 (76.8)	28.5 (83.3)	32.5 (90.5)	34.1 (93.4)	34.0 (93.2)	32.9 (91.2)	32.0 (89.6)	32.2 (90.0)	32.4 (90.3)	32.1 (89.8)	29.9 (85.8)	26.3 (79.3)	31.0 (87.8)
Daily mean °C (°F)	17.6 (63.7)	21.3 (70.3)	25.9 (78.6)	28.4 (83.1)	29.0 (84.2)	29.0 (84.2)	28.7 (83.7)	28.8 (83.8)	28.6 (83.5)	27.4 (81.3)	23.7 (74.7)	19.2 (66.6)	25.6 (78.1)
Mean daily minimum °C (°F)	12.0 (53.6)	15.4 (59.7)	20.1 (68.2)	23.5 (74.3)	24.8 (76.6)	26.0 (78.8)	26.2 (79.2)	26.3 (79.3)	26.0 (78.8)	24.0 (75.2)	19.2 (66.6)	14.1 (57.4)	21.5 (70.7)
Record low °C (°F)	6.0 (42.8)	8.1 (46.6)	11.5 (52.7)	17.3 (63.1)	18.9 (66.0)	21.0 (69.8)	22.0 (71.6)	23.0 (73.4)	22.8 (73.0)	17.0 (62.6)	11.1 (52.0)	6.6 (43.9)	6.0 (42.8)
Average precipitation mm (inches)	4 (0.2)	7 (0.3)	24 (0.9)	40 (1.6)	106 (4.2)	241 (9.5)	333 (13.1)	379 (14.9)	310 (12.2)	264 (10.4)	166 (6.5)	32 (1.3)	1,907 (75.1)
Average precipitation days (≥ 1 mm)	1	2	3	7	12	17	23	22	17	9	2	1	116
Average relative humidity (%)	77	72	70	74	79	84	86	85	85	82	78	78	79
Mean monthly sunshine hours	188.0	203.6	225.3	218.0	199.7	140.8	134.1	143.6	148.4	196.7	207.7	180.1	2,186
Source 1: NOAA
Source 2: Bangladesh Meteorological Department (humidity 1981-2010)
