= Corruption in Bangladesh =

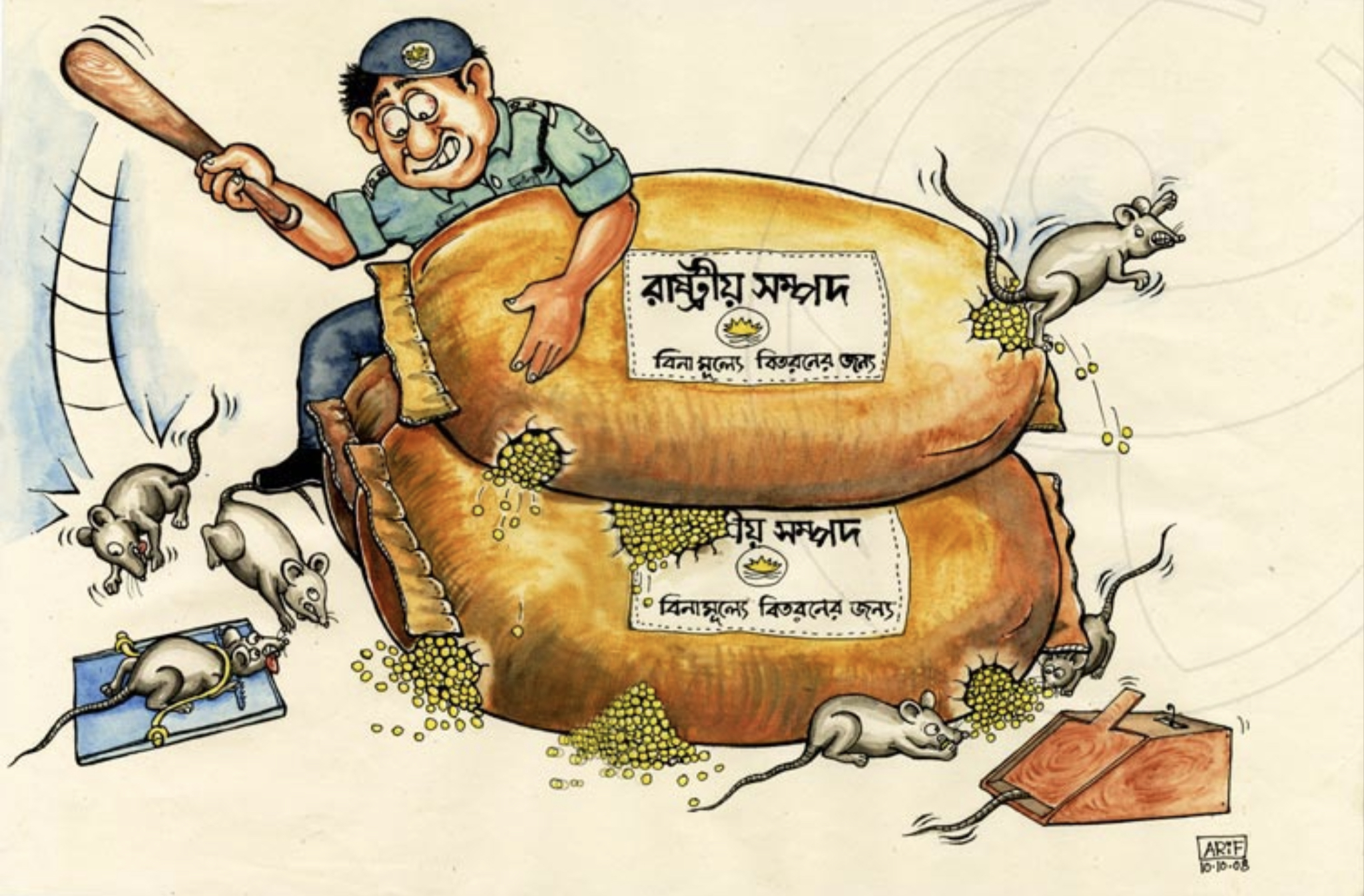
A cartoon made by Arifur Rahman in 2008

Corruption in Bangladesh has been a continuing problem. Like many other developing and emerging countries, corruption is a part of life in Bangladesh. Regular citizens routinely pay bribes for basic services and to skip queues, and officials rely on bribes to make a living.

As of 2001, corruption in the public sector was "endemic, chronic and all pervasive".

The Anti Corruption Commission was formed in 2004, but is considered to be largely ineffective in investigating and preventing corruption because of governmental control over it. The Anti Corruption Commission chairman Iqbal Mahmood admitted in November 2020 that "there are high levels of bribery and corruption in government services" in Bangladesh.

In Transparency International's 2025 Corruption Perceptions Index, which scored 182 countries on a scale from 0 ("highly corrupt") to 100 ("very clean"), Bangladesh scored 24. Bangladesh was ranked among the 13 most corrupt countries globally in the index. For comparison with regional scores, the best score among those countries of the Asia Pacific region that appeared in the Index (Note: Afghanistan, Australia, Bangladesh, Bhutan, Brunei Darussalam, Cambodia, China, Fiji, Hong Kong, India, Indonesia, Japan, North Korea, South Korea, Laos, Malaysia, Maldives, Mongolia, Myanmar, Nepal, New Zealand, Pakistan, Papua New Guinea, Philippines, Singapore, Solomon Islands, Sri Lanka, Taiwan, Thailand, Timor-Leste, Vanuatu, Vietnam) was 84, the average score was 45 and the worst score was 15. For comparison with worldwide scores, the best score was 89 (ranked 1), the average score was 42, and the worst score was 9 (ranked 181, in a two-way tie).

Commenting on Bangladesh's score on the 2025 Corruption Perceptions Index in the wake of the August 2024 fall of the authoritarian Sheikh Hasina premiership, Executive Director Iftekharuzzaman of Transparency International Bangladesh said in early 2026, "Over the past one and a half years, the interim government has failed to take effective and exemplary action against corruption. At the same time, proposed reforms by the Anti-Corruption Commission (ACC) and other institutions have largely been ignored or left unimplemented, weakening their ability to act independently." In south Asia, only Afghanistan ranks lower than Bangladesh, he said.

== Causes of corruption ==
After splitting from Pakistan in 1971, Bangladesh was ruled by a series of civilian and military governments. Riots surrounding the 2014 elections resulted in hundreds of deaths and Freedom House changed the country's "political rights" rating from 3 to 4 (with 1 being best, 7 worst). This was only one incident, however, in a modern history of highly fatal political violence.

The country's score for rule of law on the Worldwide Governance Indicators declined from 28.6 (on a scale of 0–100) in 2011 to 22.7 in 2013. Although, Bangladesh has experienced notable social and economic progress since around the turn of the century, it remained one of the world's poorest nations in 2015, with 76.5% of the population living on less than US$2 a day.

== Corruption by sector ==
As of 2001, bribery, misappropriation of funds, excessive lobbying, delays in performing services, pilferage, neglect of duties, abuse of power, and patronage were rampant throughout the public sector. This included law enforcement, customs, tax authorities, banking, education, health care, the judiciary, and utilities.

A 2012 study found that 97% of MPs were involved in illegal activities, with 77% abusing their positions on local election boards, 75% abusing development projects for their own benefit, including accepting commissions in exchange for approving projects or programs, 53% being involved in outright criminal acts, 69% influencing procurement decisions, and 62% influential local elections.

Fully 45% of Bangladeshis view political parties as corrupt, while 41% regard the parliament as corrupt. Only the police and the judiciary are viewed as more corrupt. Many politicians are regarded as out-and-out criminals, while the parties also "are believed to harbour criminals and terrorists," according to Transparency International Bangladesh. The parties routinely exchange party funds for favours or pay them out because of extortion. They also improperly use state funds to buy jobs, licenses, and contracts for party members and other purposes. Party finances are largely non-transparent; despite regulations requiring reporting to the election commission, reports are scanty or absent and non-compliance is rarely punished. Also, both the parliament and the political parties are under the influence of business, with 56% of MPs now being business people.

=== Politicians ===
==== Bangladesh Awami League ====
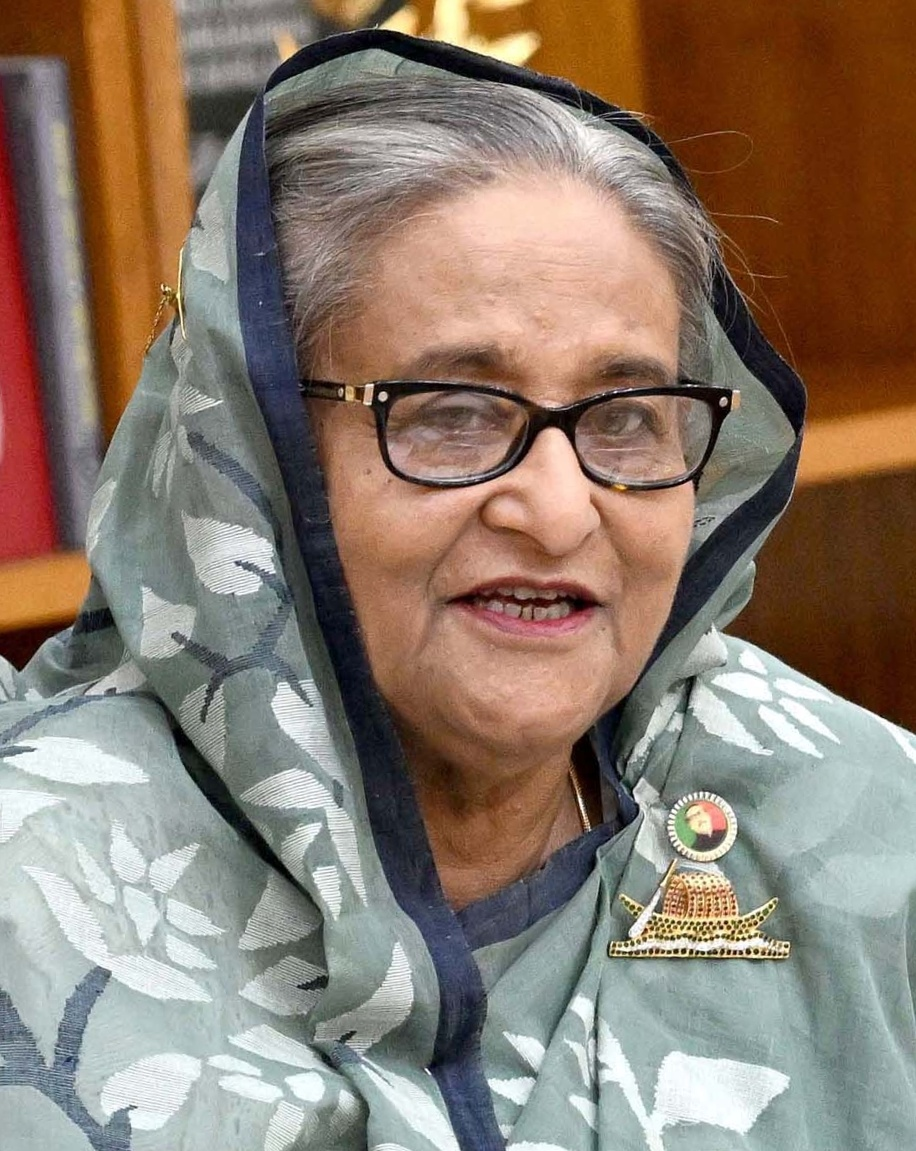
Sheikh Hasina, the former Prime Minister of Bangladesh, was accused in Padma Bridge graft scandal in 2016-2017.

On 9 April 2012, Railway Minister Suranjit Sengupta's assistant personal secretary, general manager of the eastern region, and commandant of security were driving to Suranjit's residence with 7.4 million taka of bribe money, when the driver Azam Khan turned them in.

In 2012, World Bank alleged that Syed Abul Hossain was one of the corruption conspirators in the Padma Bridge Scandal. He resigned from his office on 23 July 2012. Former state minister for foreign affairs and MP of Awami League Abul Hasan Chowdhury was also involved in that corruption plot. Another person involved in this case was Mujibur Rahman Chowdhury. He is the nephew of Sheikh Hasina, a member of parliament, and also a civil contractor. SNC-Lavalin admitted to bribing him in order to obtain contracts Soon after the case emanated, Sheikh Hasina disavowed her nephew and campaigned for his opponent during the 2014 general election.

On 29 August 2012, Anti Corruption Commission of Bangladesh said that they have the information that Syed Modasser Ali, adviser to the prime minister Sheikh Hasina, allegedly influenced Sonali Bank authorities into granting scam loan to the controversial Hallmark Group.

On 24 April 2013, a commercial building named Rana Plaza in Savar, Dhaka, Bangladesh collapsed due to structural failure. That building was owned by Sohel Rana, a Jubo League leader.

On 27 April 2014, the incident named Narayanganj Seven murder occurred. The main plotter of that incident, Nur Hossain, was the vice-president of Siddhirganj Awami League.

On 15 October 2015, Awami League MP Manjurul Islam Liton was arrested for shooting a 9-year-old boy named Shahadat Hossain Shoura.

On 10 April 2016, Bangladesh Supreme Court Appellate Division upheld 13-year jail to former minister of Disaster Management and Relief Mofazzal Hossain Chowdhury rejecting his review plea seeking acquittal in graft case.

In November 2016, Awami League MP Abdur Rahman Bodi was sentenced to three years of prison and fined US$1 million for illegally amassing and hiding wealth of US$100 million.

On 13 July 2017, Gazi Tarique Salman, a civil servant (UNO) was harassed by police, local administration, and local Awami League leader Obaidullah Saju.

Even though Swiss National Bank (SNB)'s data published on 29 June 2017 shows that Bangladesh has BDT 4423,00,00,00,000 in Swiss banks which is an increase by 20% since 2013–14, Bangladesh's minister of finance Abul Mal Abdul Muhit said that "Media exaggerated rise of Bangladeshi deposit in Swiss banks".

Bangladesh's anti-corruption commissioner filed cases against former Prime Minister Sheikh Hasina and 49 ex-ministers for siphoning more than $150 billion to various countries, including India, Hong Kong, Switzerland, Luxembourg, Singapore, Malaysia, UAE, Australia, UK, USA, and New Zealand. Former Prime Minister Sheikh Hasina, her son Sajeeb Wazed and niece Tulip Siddiq accused of embezzling more than $5 billion from the Rooppur Nuclear Power Plant project that costs Bangladeshi tax payers $12.65 billion.

Al Jazeera's Investigation Exposed Bangladesh's Minister Saifuzzaman Chowdhury's exclusive property portfolio in Dubai, London, New York, San Francisco, and New Jersey. According to undercover video recordings of the Al Jazeera investigation unit, Former Prime Minister Sheikh Hasina knew all along about Mr Chowdhury's corruption.

==== Bangladesh Nationalist Party ====
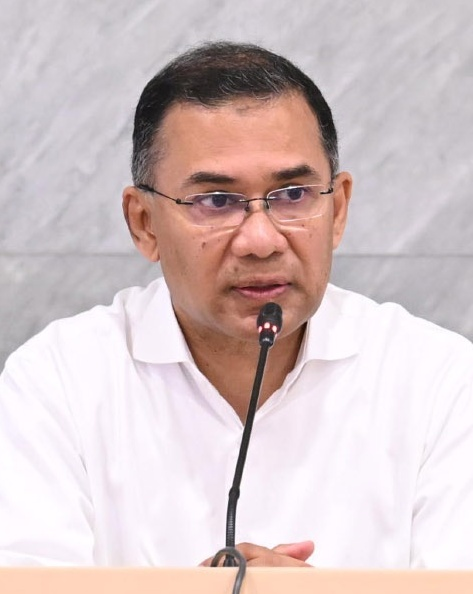
Tarique Rahman, the current Prime Minister of Bangladesh, was accused in digital money laundering case with Bangladesh Bank during 2001–2006.

In 2007, Military backed caretaker government charged Harris Chowdhury, former Political Secretary of Prime Minister Khaleda Zia, of acquiring his wealth through corruption. Chowdhury was charged with involvement in the Murder of former finance minister, Shah A M S Kibria, in 2005. He was also charged with involvement in 15 August 2004 Dhaka grenade attack and Zia Charitable Trust corruption case. On 21 December 2014, an arrest warrant was issued against him. His properties were confiscated by the directives of Bangladesh High Court. Harris Chowdhury is a fugitive from 2007.

On 22 July 2007, Wadud Bhuiyan received 20-years' of prison sentence for illegally amassing more than a million dollar of cash and property.

On 16 October 2008, it has been reported that the Interpol found the trace of a deposit of BD taka 141.5 million with a bank in Hong Kong of former foreign minister Morshed Khan. Both he and his son Faisal Morshed Khan have been convicted in several cases relating to corruption, hiding wealth information, land grabbing and criminal activities after the caretaker government came to power in January 2007. Both of them are fugitive from 2007. On 5 June 2016, High Court ordered freezing of Morshed Khan, his wife and son's Hong Kong bank accounts.

On 3 November 2008, a leaked US Embassy cable said that the Embassy in Dhaka believed Tarique Rahman was "guilty of egregious political corruption that has had a serious adverse effect on US national interests". Rahman was sentenced to seven years’ imprisonment in 2016 by a Bangladeshi court in a money-laundering case involving BDT 200 million. In December 2024, the Supreme Court of Bangladesh stayed the prison sentence.

On 24 June 2011, Niko Resources, a Calgary-based oil and gas company, has pleaded guilty to bribing Bangladeshi minister AKM Mosharraf Hossain with a luxury SUV and a trip to New York and Calgary, and will pay a $9.5-million fine.

The Anti-Corruption Commission filed the case with Gulshan Police Station on 16 August 2011 against Hafiz and his wife for laundering US$1.75 million to Singapore. On 23 August 2015 Bangladesh Supreme Court scrapped his acquittal from High Court.

On 4 July 2014, Bangladesh Supreme Court sentenced former minister of civil aviation Mir Mohammad Nasiruddin and his son Mir Helal Uddin to thirteen years' of prison in two separate corruption cases.

On 15 November 2014, Professor AKM Shafiul Islam Lilon of Department of Social Science of Rajshahi University was hacked to death by Jubo Dal (youth wing of Bangladesh Nationalist Party) leader Anwar Hossain Ujjal.

==== Jatiya Party (Ershad) ====
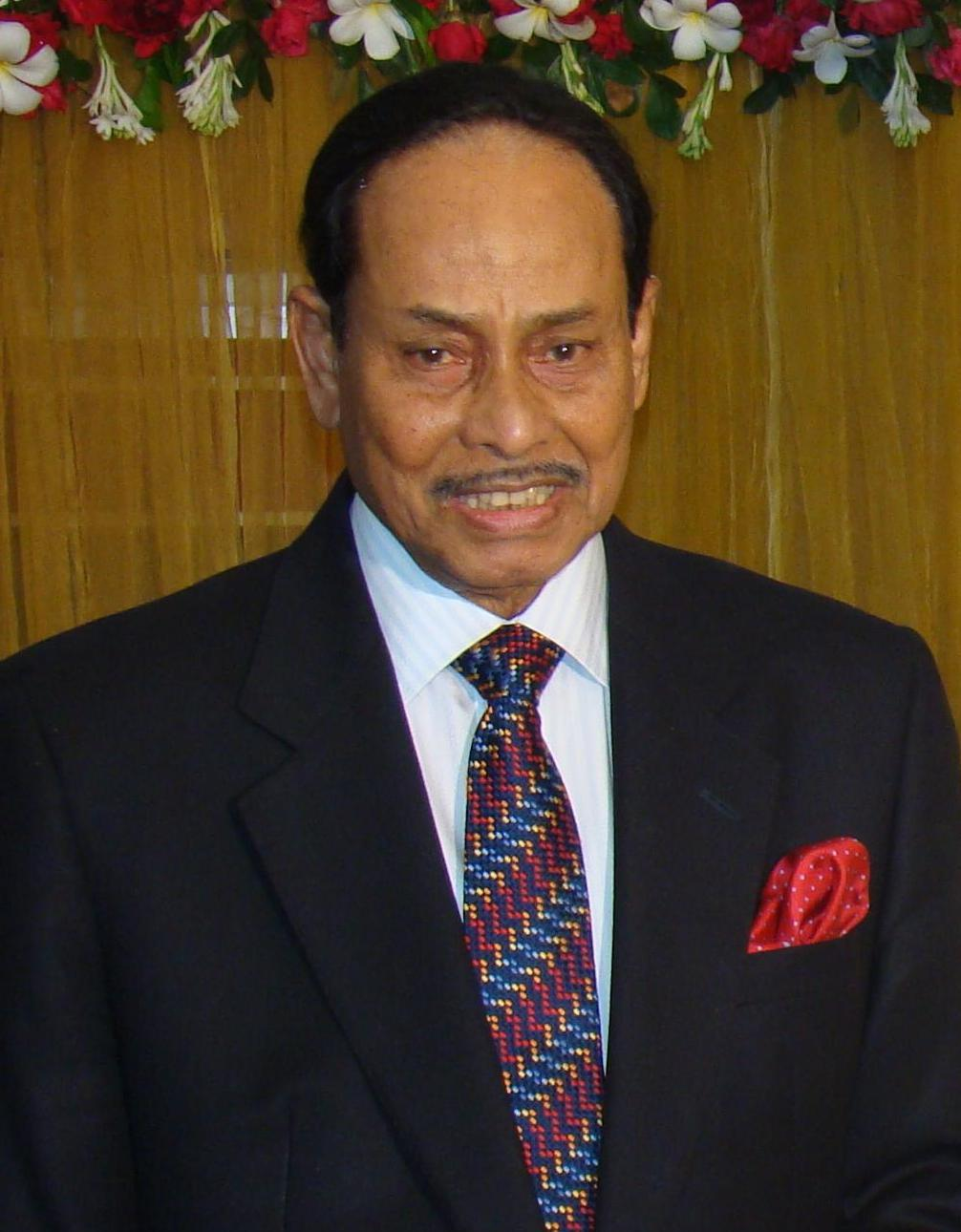
Hussain Muhammad Ershad convicted in Janata Tower Case.

Known in Bangladesh as "Sugar Zafar", Kazi Zafar Ahmed, because of his alleged role in the hijacking of a multimillion-dollar aid shipment of sugar, he was sentenced to 15 years' jail in absentia on corruption charges by a Dhaka court in November 1999.

On 20 November 2000, Hussain Muhammad Ershad was convicted and sentenced for Janata Tower Case. As a result, he was declared ineligible to contest the general election of 2001. Ershad is also the main accused of the murder case of Major General Abul Manzoor.

On 10 November 2002, the dead body of a prominent model named Syeda Tania Mahbub Tinni was found under the Buriganga Bridge which was later found to be perpetrated by former student cadre and MP of Jatiyo Party, Golam Faruk Ovi. Golam Faruk Ovi is a fugitive and believed to be hiding in Canada.

=== Student politics ===
In public universities and colleges the student wings of ruling political parties dominate the campuses and residential halls through crime and violence to gain various unauthorised facilities. They control the residential halls to manage seats in favour of their party members and loyal pupils. They eat and buy for free from restaurants and shops inside their campus. They extort and grab tenders to earn illicit money. They take money from job seekers and put pressure on university administrations to appoint them. In government colleges they take money from freshmen candidates and put pressure on teachers and officials to get acceptance for them. Some of them have been involved in robbery and extortion.

== Government ==
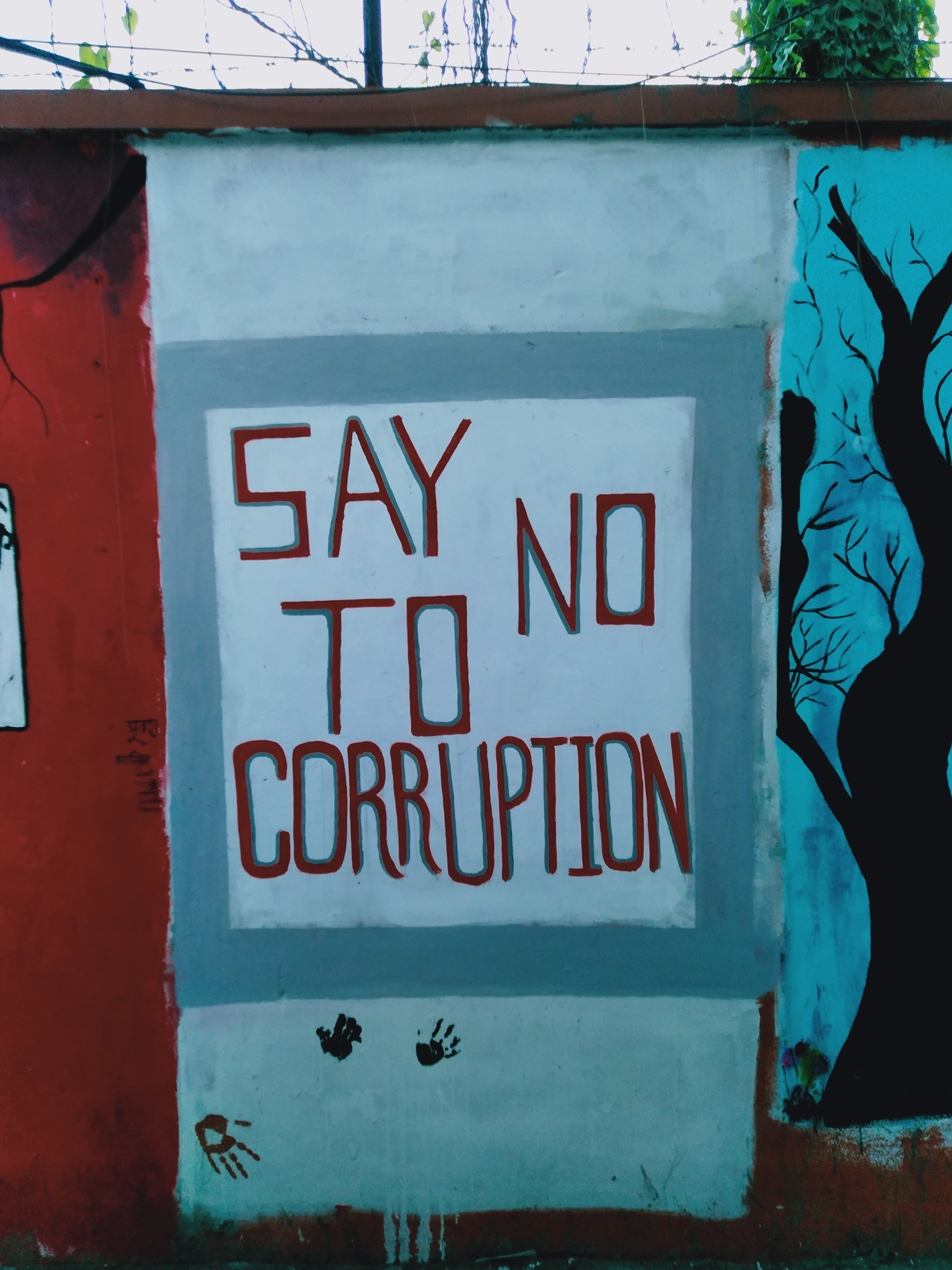
A graffiti against corruption drawn by the students after the July Revolution

Corruption abounds in Bangladeshi government offices. Many officials receive salaries without having any actual assigned work. Officials are recruited and promoted for reasons that are not objectively clear. Solicitation of bribes is common. In a 2013 survey, 76% of respondents said corruption was a problem in the public sector, and 39% said they had paid a bribe during the previous 12 months. Bribes were especially common when dealing with the police (72%), the judiciary (63%), land services (44%), and registry and permit services (33%). Bribes were paid to obtain a service (58%), to speed up service (33%), to express thanks (7%), or to obtain cheaper services (3%). These numbers, though unimpressive, mark a significant improvement over 2010.

In 2010, then president Zillur Rahman pardoned twenty convicted murderers of Shabbir Ahmed Gamma. In July 2011, he again pardoned Awami League leader and convicted murderer Biplob.

Prime examples of government corruption are 2011 Bangladesh share market scam.

Padma Bridge Scandal, occurred in 2011, was the largest political scandal in Bangladesh that involved the ruling Bangladesh Awami League's government who allegedly sought a large amount money from the Canadian construction company SNC-Lavalin in exchange for awarding them the construction contract.

On 10 December 2012, some hackers hacked and posted the seventeen hours' of Skype call of chief justice Nizamul Huq on YouTube where he suggested that he was under pressure from the government to reach a quick verdict in the ongoing 1971 war crime cases against the country's senior opposition leaders.

=== Public services ===
The public sectors are among the country's most corrupt. In few countries is bribery more common in connection with public utilities. Nearly six out of ten firms report that they have to offer bribes, "gifts," or facilitation payments in exchange for licenses or public utility concessions or to "get things done." Unclear, contradictory regulations abound, and are often exploited by officials seeking informal payments. Engineer Delwoar Hossain of Gazipur City Corporation was killed on 21 May 2020. According to his relatives, one investigation agency, and Transparency International Bangladesh (TIB) Delwoar was murdered for his stance against corruption.

=== Foreign affairs ===
SBS Bangla news reported that corrupt officials at Bangladesh high commission, Canberra, issued the visa to 2000 Rohingya refugees. Australian Federal Police is investigating the matter related to fake passports issued to Rohingya refugees by Bangladeshi officials. Bangladesh Police interrogated deported Rohingya refugees. During questioning, Rohingya refugees told authorities that one Bangladeshi official at the High Commission in Canberra issued the visa.

Some 54,000 Rohingya refugees travelled to Middle Eastern countries and illegally acquired Bangladeshi passports from the Bangladeshi consulate based in Middle East. Some 30,000 Rohingya refugees received work permits from Saudi Arabia. According to German public broadcaster, Deutsche Welle, corrupt consulate officials issued Bangladeshi passports to 54,000 Rohingya refugees. Saudi authorities have demanded the Bangladesh government repatriate Rohingya refugees who hold Bangladeshi passports.

=== Land administration ===
Corruption is widespread in the Bangladeshi land administration. Most companies expect to make informal payments in exchange for construction permits. In a country where land is scarce, title disputes are common, and title registration takes much longer than is the average in South Asia. The collapse of an eight-story factory in April 2013 was the result of substantial building code violations, and highlighted the role of corruption in the issuance of permits and licenses and in safety inspections.

=== Tax administration ===
The Bangladeshi tax system is highly corrupt. In no country is it more common to be charged irregular payments in connection with taxation. More than forty percent of firms surveyed expected to present tax officials with gifts. Because the National Board of Revenue is poorly administered, tax collectors are able to collude with taxpayers, accepting personal payments in exchange for lower tax rates.

=== Public procurement ===
The awarding of government contracts in Bangladesh very frequently involves nepotism, fraud, bribery, and favouritism. Nearly half of companies surveyed expect to make irregular payments to secure government contracts. The Public Procurement Act, Public Procurement Rules, and other legislation are intended to guarantee above-board conduct in this sector, but they are at best poorly enforced.

=== Judiciary ===
The Bangladeshi judicial system is inefficient and under the influence of the executive branch. Political appointments, promotions, and firings are routine, and it can be difficult to enforce contracts and resolve disputes. Prosecutors, who earn only $37.50 a month, are especially susceptible to bribery.

In 2010, Judiciary of Bangladesh was ranked as the most corrupt institution of the country. The most prominent aspect of the judiciary of Bangladesh is, it is not an independent institution of the state in that both judiciary and the executive branch of the government are overlapped. Bangladesh's Judicial system is infested by partisanship, governmental or political influence, judicial corruption, delays in verdicts, and abuse of power.

==== Judges ====
On 3 March 2007, University of Chittagong revoked the LLB certificate of the judge Faisal Mahmud Faizee and seventy others for tampering with their mark-sheets, asking them to immediately return their certificates.

On 26 July 2014, it has been reported that three senior judges, AKM Ishtiaque Hussain, Md Mizanur Rahman, Salauddin Mohammad Akram, would lose their jobs because of various types of corruptions.

On 14 August 2016, Bangladesh Ministry of Law said that they have started the process of dismissing four judges, SM Aminul Islam, Ruhul Amin Khandaker, Sirajul Islam and Moinul Haque, for grave corruptions.

==== Impunity ====
Bangladesh has a huge backlog of unresolved cases both civil and criminal. Political clout is believed to be the main factor behind most of the unsolved murder cases.

According to Global Impunity Index of CJP published on 27 October 2016, Bangladesh occupies 11th position in the list where journalists are slain and killers go free.

==== Politics of trial ====
In Bangladesh, generally the government files politically motivated cases against the opposition, and these cases get withdrawn or quashed when the opposition takes control of the government in turn.

=== Law enforcement ===
==== Bangladesh Police ====
Low salaries and poor training make the police susceptible to bribery as well. The force is characterised by political patronage and a culture of impunity. International businesses have said that the Bangladeshi police force is one of the world's least reliable.

In 2002, Transparency International Bangladesh revealed that Bangladesh Police is one of the most corrupt public institutions in Bangladesh. In 2013, they again published the same assessment. Asian Human Rights Commission revealed that people of Bangladesh pay more to police than to the government. Police force benefits from political patronage and culture of impunity. Police is involved in blackmailing, extortion, torture, rape, and killing.

==== Rapid Action Battalion ====
Law enforcement agencies like Rapid Action Battalion are involved in extrajudicial killing, murder, abduction, and rampant human rights abuse. Brother of Former Army Chief of Staff General Aziz has admitted on camera of the use of Rapid Action Battalion to torture innocent civilian who refused to pay extortion money to him. The recording of the admission was released by Al Jazeera News. Gowher Rizvi, the foreign affairs advisor to the Prime Minister acknowledged that there are corrupt practices amongst all law enforcing agencies and government is looking into the matter.

Bangladesh Rapid Action Battalion's whistleblowers told German broadcaster DW News that Rapid Action Battalion's service members were involved in various crimes, including extrajudicial killings, extortion and corruption. DW News released verified audio tapes of the victim's family members calling the victim while the victim was shot several times in his chest.

The Rapid Action Battalion was also involved in the suppression of freedom of speech and victimising opposition leaders from the Bangladesh Nationalist Party under the instruction of Prime Sheikh Hasina and the Home Minister. Bangladesh army officers who are seconded to the infamous counterterrorism force are involved in a competition to kill innocent people to get credit from their superiors.

According to the German public broadcaster Deutsche Welle, officers who committed serious crimes and corruption are currently deployed in the UN peacekeeping mission in Africa, violating the UN charter. The U.S. Treasury sanctioned the Bangladesh Rapid Action Battalion for corruption and violation of human rights.

==== Bangladesh Armed Forces ====
Although, Bangladesh Armed Forces are uniformed soldiers, they are also involved in large scale corruption. Bangladesh military officers are known to receiving illicit loans from the Trust Bank and VDP bank. The Bangladesh Rifles revolt was partly fueled by resentment among the BDR troops over the corruption of army officers who led them for many years were personally profiting from consumer goods sold by the organization.

Transparency International reports that the purpose of military intervention is to hide rampant corruption since the military take over in January 2007.

According to Government Defence Integrity Index (GDI), the defence sector of Bangladesh scored 25, which is a very high risk of corruption. Transparency International reported that Bangladesh's annual military budget had reached US$4.8 billion, increasing the magnitude of corruption.

In October 2002, more than 10,000 people were detained without charges in operation by Bangladesh Army, dubbed Clean Heart, including the Bangladesh Nationalist Party and the Awami League party members.

The Bangladesh Army wields effective power over Bangladesh's democratic institutions while remaining in the background to gain financial benefits from the business the politicians afford to the military. The Director General of Defence Procurement (DGDP) found to be colluding with the business arm of Bangladesh military controlled conglomerate Sena Kallyan Sanstha (SKS) to divert defence budget to military's private businesses. Bangladesh has launched another conglomerate, the Army Welfare Trust to divert funds to private businesses. The Awami League Government afforded these business to Bangladesh Military as a sweetener to use military to suppress voters during elections.

In 2012, Defence Adviser Maj Gen (Retd) Tarique Ahmed Siddique was involved in bribery of BDT 7 million carried by a government vehicle. The vehicle with the money was confiscated by the Border Guard Bangladesh. Maj Gen (Retd) Tarique Ahmed Siddique called the then chief of army staff, General Md Abdul Mubeen to release the vehicle and the money. Intelligence sources reported that the Army chief was paid a large some of the money to release the vehicle.

The Prime Minister of Bangladesh, Sheikh Hasina was prosecuted for receiving a facilitator payment of $4 million to buy eight MiG-29 aircraft for Bangladesh Air Force from Russia. Bangladesh's Bureau of Anti-Corruption charged Prime Minister Sheikh Hasina for buying a navy frigate from South Korea at an unusually high price while in office. Bureau of Anti-Corruption filed two corruption charges against Prime Minister Sheikh Hasina for misappropriating $126 million from two defence deals in 1998.

Former Army Chief of Staff, General Moyeen U Ahmed took loans more than the permitted amount as a customer of the military controlled Trust Bank and left the country without repaying the loans.

According to a report by AA newspaper, Bangladesh Army officers and Bangladesh's ruling Awami League party members operate almost 60 illegal casinos and money laundering dens worth $120 million in the capital city Dhaka. Law enforcement agencies reportedly investigated the corruption and misdeeds of Bangladesh Army officers involved in the casino scandal in Bangladesh. According to Washington-based Global Financial Integrity, around $6 billion was siphoned off from Bangladesh in a single year 2015 by ruling party members and the military.

The Bangladesh government has discharged Lt. General (retired) Chowdhury Hasan Sarwardi for blowing the lid on corrupt practices among high-ranking military officers of the Bangladesh Army posted in Director General of Defence Procurement (DGDP).

Al Jazeera news exposed corruption of former Army Chief of Bangladesh, General Aziz and the United Nations called on Bangladesh government for a full investigation into evidence of corruption by Bangladesh army. Former Army Chief of Staff General Aziz was accepting bribes from law enforcement officers in order to place them in the positions of power that will allow them to collect more bribes and make financial gains. A recording of General Aziz's admission to the corruption was released by Al Jazeera news. The U.S. State Department blacklisted former chief of the Bangladesh Army General Aziz Ahmed due to his involvement in significant corruption.

High-ranking army officers at the Directorate General Defense Purchase (DGDP) received grease payment for procuring arms from Chinese Norinco and Russian Rosoboronexport.

Bangladesh Anti-Corruption Commission decided on 4 September 2024 to initiate an inquiry against former army chief retired General Aziz Ahmed over allegations of amassing a huge amount of illegal wealth at home and abroad. On September 4, the Bangladesh Bank's Financial Intelligence Unit audited Lt Gen Mujibur Rahman, Lt Gen Mohammad Saiful Alam, and Major General Ziaul Ahsan's bank accounts. It also froze the accounts of their spouses, children, and businesses.

=== Banking ===
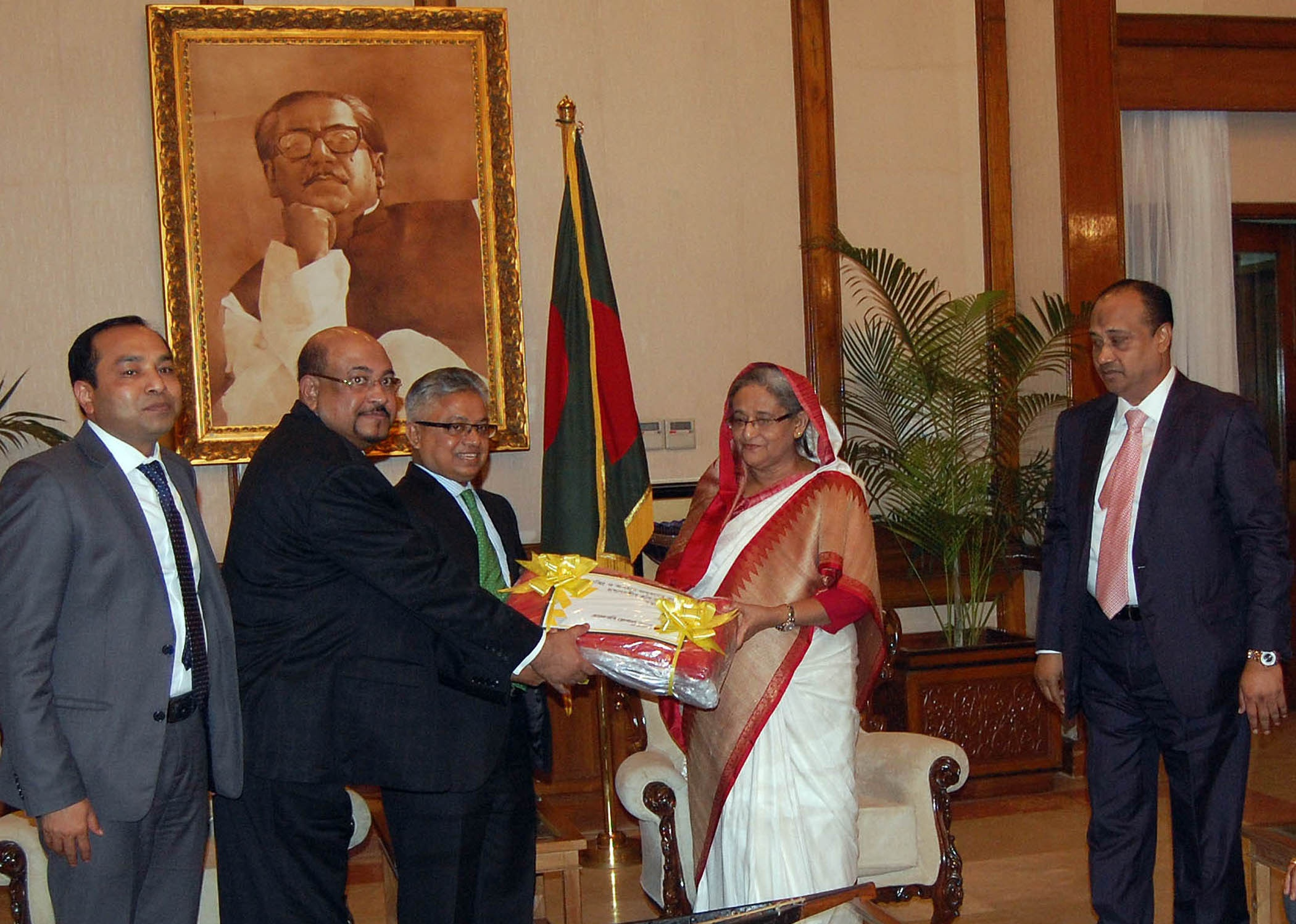
Bangladeshi businessmen Prashanta Kumar Halder (leftmost) and Mohammed Saiful Alam Masud (rightmost), later accused of embezzling approximately $854 million and $234 billion, respectively, from various banks in Bangladesh, at a meeting with Prime Minister Sheikh Hasina in 2015.

In 2015, it was revealed that some Bangladeshi accounts of HSBC were involved in money laundering activities. HSBC was also involved in tax evasion activities.

In 2020, it was found that Prashanta Kumar Halder had stolen 15 billion taka from International Leasing and Financial Services Limited, 22 billion from FAS Finance & Investment Limited, 30 billion from People's Leasing And Financial Services Limited, and 25 billion taka from Reliance Finance Limited. He was being investigated by Bangladesh Financial Intelligence Unit and the Anti Corruption Commission.

=== Health and hygiene ===
A 2012 Survey by Transparency International Bangladesh showed that 40.2% of the people fell victim to the irregularities and corruptions in public hospitals. Doctors, nurses and other professionals working in government-run public hospitals have long been accused of demanding bribes for services which are supposed to be provided free of cost. The survey also alleged that the recruitment, transfer and promotion process of personnel in this sector is also corrupted. Although the allegations were rejected by the Government Health Ministry.

The survey reported that there is lack of regulation from the government in the private health care sector. The medical practitioners in these sector earn money by driving up health care costs and commission agreements with diagnostic centres.

According to patients, even in emergency needs, they were unable to access services unless a bribe is paid first.

== Business ==
Companies have been reported to be subjected to expensive and useless license and permit requirements. In 2014–2015, business executives said corruption was the second largest obstacle to doing business in Bangladesh. Business people are often expected to bribe public officials, often in connection with annual taxes. Fully 48% of companies have been asked to pay bribes, and most firms seeking licenses are asked for bribes, with 55% of construction permits, 77% of import licenses, 56% of water connection arrangements and 48% of electricity connection arrangements involving bribes.

Politicians are involved in giving contracts to foreign companies by taking bribes or kickbacks in closed-door negotiations. Major public contracts are often said to involve corruption. Fully 49% of companies said they had to present "gifts" to win state contracts, with those "gifts" averaging a value of 3% of the contract value.

Business owners do not obey proper safety codes of the buildings and workplaces. As a result, several large accidents occurred and killed hundreds. The garment industry is also rife with corruption, with leaders in the industry obtaining tax concessions, gaining special access to infrastructure, and ignoring with impunity official safety and security regulations. Because of this brand of corruption, the Rana Plaza factory complex collapsed, killing over 1200. Owing to corruption, the builders had been able to ignore many construction regulations.

Various international sources provided $2.9 billion to build the Padma Multilateral Purpose Bridge near Dhaka in 2011. After the World Bank learned in 2012 of "a high-level corruption conspiracy among politicians, businessmen, and private individuals" in connection with the bridge, support for the project was withdrawn by several of the sources.

Transparency International attributes the ubiquity and high level of corruption in Bangladesh to the power of business interests over the political parties and parliament.

=== Road safety ===
Traffic is heavy and chaotic in urban areas, specially in big cities. Streets are extremely congested and the usual traffic and safety rules are not applied or obeyed. Most drivers are untrained, unlicensed and uninsured. Over the years, road accidents have risen to a disastrous level. Bangladesh Jatri Kalyan Samity, assessed that 8,589 people had died in road accidents across the country in 2014. 5,000 people died in road accidents in 2015. According to World Bank statistics, annual fatality rate from road accidents is found to be 85.6 fatalities per 10,000 vehicles. Chaos in the street is usually caused by reckless driving and jaywalking which leads to fatal accidents. Police, Ministers, Lawmakers, VIPs have the tendency to break traffic laws by driving on the reverse sides of the roads.

== Effect of corruption ==
=== Money in Swiss banks ===
According to the data published by Swiss National Bank (SNB) on 29 June 2017, BDT 4,42,300,00,00,000 (four lakh forty-two thousand three hundred crore) in Swiss banks which has been increased by 20% since 2013-14 .

=== Foreign investment ===
According to the US report on the Bangladesh's investment climate,

Corruption is common in public procurement, tax and customs collection, and regulatory authorities. Corruption, including bribery and raises the costs.

== Anti-corruption ==
=== Anti Corruption Commission ===
Anti Corruption Commission Bangladesh (ACC) was formed through an act promulgated on 23 February 2004 that came into force on 9 May 2004. The commission is often criticised for being ineffective and a wastage of resources due to the influence of the government over it. The Anti-Corruption Commission of Bangladesh is crippled by the 2013 amendment of the Anti Corruption Commission Act introduced by the ruling Awami League government, which makes it necessary for the commission to obtain permissions from the government to investigate or file any charge against government bureaucrats or politicians.

In 2015, the ACC investigated the case of Padma Bridge Scandal. Even though the World Bank continuously pressed the government to take actions against the perpetrators, after 53 days' of investigation, ACC found nobody to be guilty. On the basis of ACC's report, Dhaka district judge court acquitted all the seven government officials who were believed to be involved in the corruption plot. Before that, ACC even exonerated Syed Abul Hossain and ex-state minister for foreign affairs Abul Hasan Chowdhury from the allegation of involvement in the corruption conspiracy.

=== Transparency International Bangladesh ===
Transparency International Bangladesh (TIB) is an independent, non-government, non-partisan and non-profit organisation which is a fully accredited national chapter of Berlin-based Transparency International in Bangladesh. TIB undertakes research and surveys to investigate the magnitude and impact of corruption and suggest necessary moves for establishing a transparent system of governance, politics and business. The reports and researches published by TIB regarding corruptions are routinely rejected and overlooked by the Government and other responsible wings.

== Corruption Perceptions Index score of Bangladesh over time ==
The following table is depicting the comparison of Corruption Perceptions Index scores of various countries in South Asia as scored by Transparency International. Countries in the Index are scored from 0 to 100, where a low score indicates a perception that the country's public sector is very corrupt and a high score, very honest.

The global Corruption Perceptions Index of 2016, published on 25 January 2017 indicated that, even though Bangladesh gained one point in the scoring, it slipped six positions in the worldwide ranking to 145th of the 180 countries in the Index. In this ranking, the country whose public sector was perceived to be the most honest was ranked 1, and the country whose public sector was perceived to be the most corrupt, 180. Bangladesh's downward ranking change despite its upward scoring change was because countries worldwide had been able to reduce corruption more than Bangladesh. According to the report, India and Sri Lanka both plunged in the worldwide ranking. The biggest improver was Pakistan as it scored two more points than the 2015 score and also progressed one step upward in the worldwide ranking.

Years	Afghanistan	Bangladesh	Bhutan	India	Myanmar	Nepal	Pakistan	Sri Lanka
2012	8	26	63	36	15	27	27	40
2013	8	27	63	36	21	31	28	37
2014	12	25	65	38	21	29	29	38
2015	11	25	65	38	22	27	30	37
2016	15	26	65	40	28	29	32	36
2017	15	28	67	40	30	31	32	38
2018	16	26	68	41	29	31	33	38
2019	16	26	68	41	29	34	32	38
2020	19	26	68	40	28	33	31	38
2021	16	26	68	40	28	33	28	37
2022	24	25	68	40	23	34	27	36
2023	20	24	68	39	20	35	29	34
2024	17	23	72	38	16	34	27	32
2025	16	24	71	39	16	34	28	35

== Corruption Perceptions Index ranking of Bangladesh over time ==
Corruption in Bangladesh: Transparency International Ranking, 2001–2024
Year	Score	Ranking when most transparent is ranked first	Ranking when most corrupt is ranked first	No. of countries included	Ref
2012	26	144	32	176	
2013	27	136	41	177	
2014	25	145	30	175	
2015	25	139	29	168	
2016	26	145	31	176	
2017	28	143	47	180	
2018	26	149	31	180	
2019	26	146	34	180	
2020	26	146	34	180	
2021	26	147	33	180	
2022	25	147	33	180	
2023	24	149	31	180	
2024	23	151	29	180	
2025	24	150	33	182	
Source: Compiled from the TI Corruption Perception Index

== See also ==
- International Anti-Corruption Academy
- Group of States Against Corruption
- International Anti-Corruption Day
- ISO 37001 Anti-bribery management systems
- United Nations Convention against Corruption
- OECD Anti-Bribery Convention
- Transparency International
- Nepotism
- The Security Printing Corporation (Bangladesh) Ltd.
- Ghush.site
