= Premiership of Sheikh Hasina =

Period of the Government of Bangladesh from 1996 to 2001 and 2009 to 2024

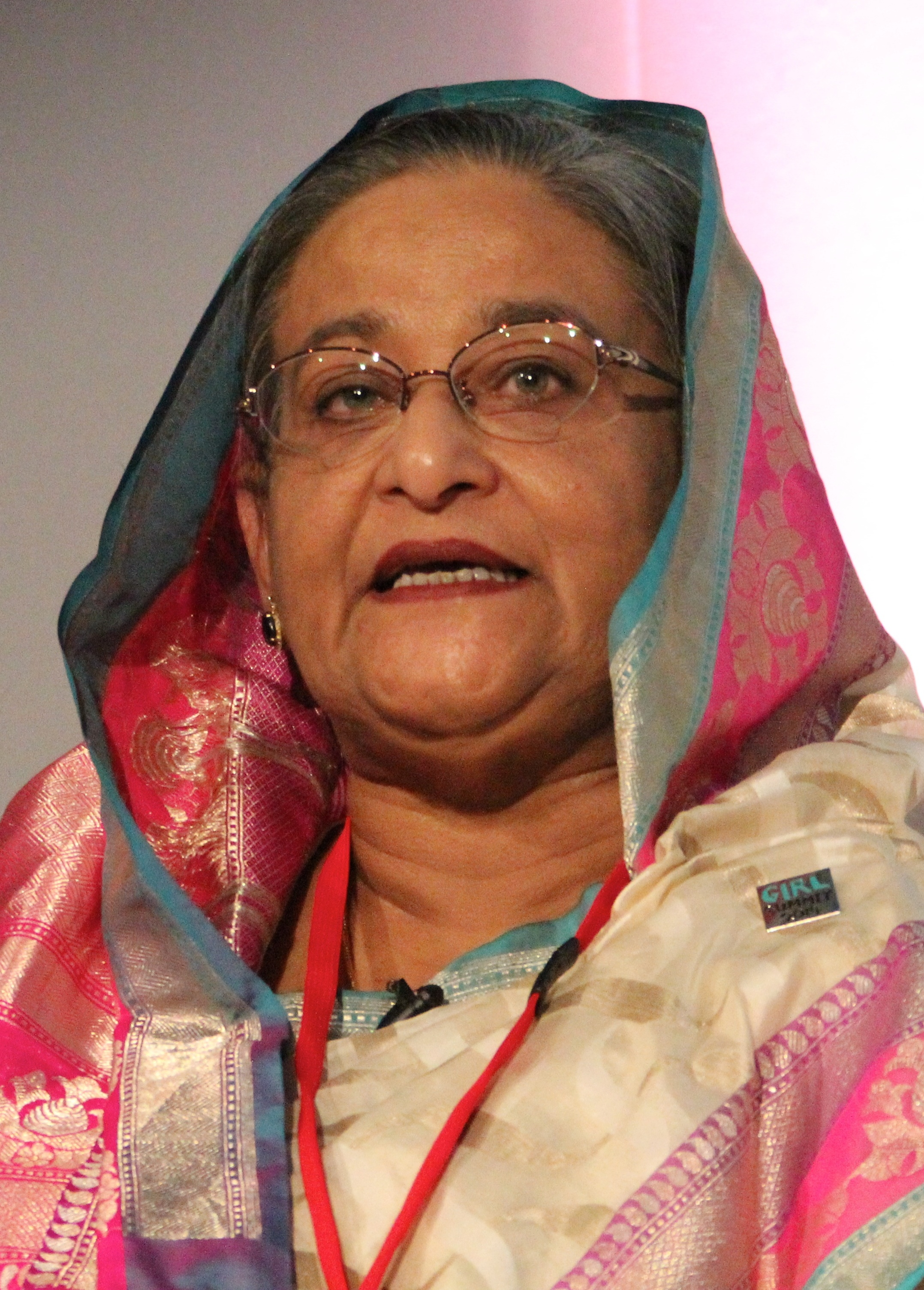
- Hasina in 2014
- Premiership of Sheikh Hasina
- Prime Minister: Sheikh Hasina
- Party: Bangladesh Awami League
- Seat: Ganabhaban
- First term 23 June 1996 – 15 July 2001
- Cabinet: First
- Election: 1996 (June)
- Appointed by: President Abdur Rahman Biswas
- Seat: Gopalganj-3
- Second term 6 January 2009 – 5 August 2024
- Cabinet: Second, Third, Fourth, Fifth
- Election: 2008, 2014, 2018, 2024
- Appointed by: President Iajuddin Ahmed; President Mohammad Abdul Hamid; President Mohammed Shahabuddin
- Seat: Gopalganj-3

Sheikh Hasina's tenure as the 10th Prime Minister of Bangladesh began on 23 June 1996, when she assumed office after her party, the Awami League, won the general election, succeeding Khaleda Zia's Bangladesh Nationalist Party (BNP). Her first term lasted until 15 July 2001. She returned to office as the 12th Prime Minister on 6 January 2009 following her party's landslide victory in the 2008 general election and had further electoral wins in 2014, 2018 and 2024 general elections, though these elections were widely criticised for lacking transparency, with opposition parties boycotting those elections and international observers alleging vote manipulation and suppression.

Her premiership ended in August 2024 following the July Uprising against her government, in which she resigned and fled to India, marking the conclusion of her 16-year uninterrupted rule.

== First premiership (1996–2001) ==
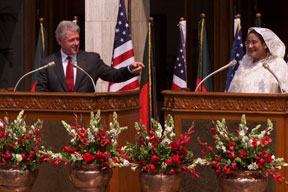
Hasina with US President Bill Clinton at the Prime Minister's Office in Dhaka, 2000

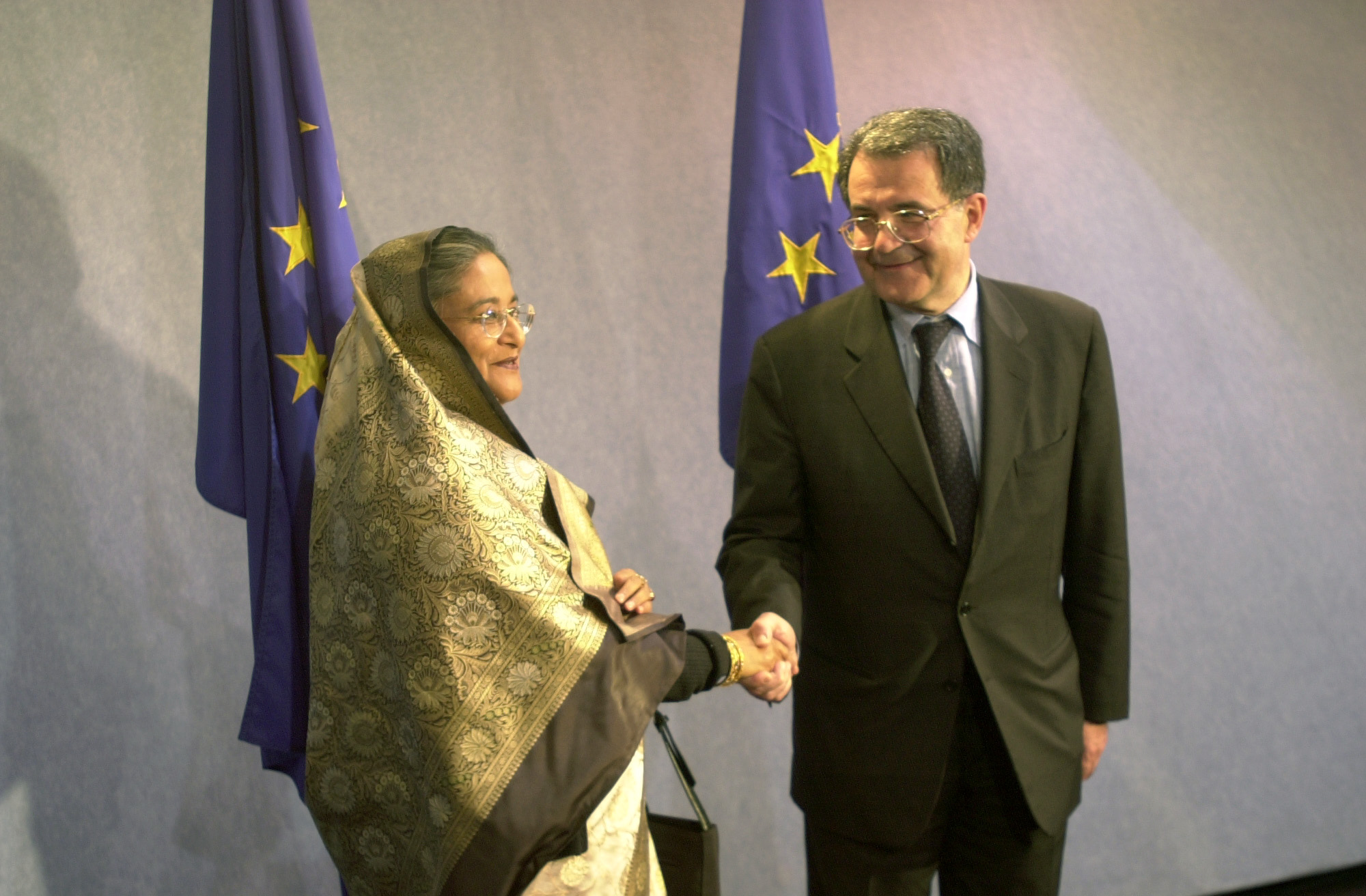
Hasina with European Commission President Romano Prodi in Brussels, 2001

The Awami League (AL), with other opposition parties, demanded that the next general elections be held under a neutral caretaker government, and that provision for caretaker governments to manage elections be incorporated in the constitution. The ruling BNP refused to act on these demands.

Opposition parties launched an unprecedented campaign, calling strikes for weeks on end. The Government accused them of destroying the economy while the opposition countered that the BNP could resolve the issue by acceding to their demands. In late 1995, the members of parliament of the AL and other parties resigned en masse. Parliament completed its five-year term and the February 1996 general election was held. The election was boycotted by all major parties except the ruling BNP, who won all the seats in the parliament as a result. Hasina described the election as a farce.

The new parliament, composed almost entirely of BNP members, amended the constitution to create provisions for a caretaker government (CTG). The June 1996 general election was held under a neutral caretaker government headed by retired Chief Justice Muhammad Habibur Rahman. The AL won 146 seats, a plurality, but fell short of a simple majority. Khaleda Zia, leader of the BNP who won 104 seats, denounced the results and alleged vote rigging. This was in contrast with the neutral observers who said that the election was free and fair.

Hasina served her first term as Prime Minister of Bangladesh from June 1996 to July 2001. She signed the 30-year water-sharing treaty with India governing the Ganges. Her administration repealed the Indemnity Act, which granted immunity from prosecution to the killers of Sheikh Mujib. Her government opened-up the telecommunications industry to the private sector, which until then was limited to government-owned companies. In December 1997, Hasina's administration signed the Chittagong Hill Tracts Peace Accord, ending the insurgency in the Chittagong Division for which Hasina won the UNESCO Peace Prize. Her government established the Ashrayan-1 Project while bilateral relations with neighbouring states improved. Hasina's government completed the Bangabandhu Bridge mega project in 1998. In 1999, the government started the New Industrial Policy (NIP) which aimed to strengthen the private sector and encourage growth.

The Hasina government implemented some reforms to different sectors of the economy, which resulted in the country attaining an average of 5.5% GDP growth. The consumer price index remained at 5%, lower than other developing states who experienced 10% inflation. The Fifth Five-Year Plan (1997–2002) of the government placed an emphasis on poverty alleviation programmes which provided credit and training to unemployed youths and women. Food-grain production increased from 19 million tons to 26.5 million tons while the poverty rate reduced. A Housing Fund was established to provide fiscal assistance to those homeless as a result of river erosion. The government launched the Ekti Bari Ekti Khamar scheme which accentuated the incomes of the poorer segments of society through household farming.

The Hasina government adopted the New Industrial Policy in 1999 which aimed to bolster the private sector and attract foreign direct investment, thus expediating the globalisation process. The NIP aimed for 25% of the economy to be industry based with 20% of the country's workforce employed in industry. It encouraged the institution of small, cottage and labour-intensive industries with an onus on skill development for women for employment, development of indigenous technology and industries based on local raw materials. The NIP allowed for foreign investors to own 100% equity in Bangladeshi enterprises without prior approval from the government and all but four sectors of the economy were opened up to the private sector.

Attempts were made to create a social security system to protect the most vulnerable in society. The Hasina administration introduced an allowance scheme which resulted in 400,000 elderly people receiving monthly allowances. This scheme was later extended to widows, distressed and deserted women. A national foundation devoted to rehabilitation and training of people, with disabilities was founded with an initial grant of ৳100 million funded by the government. The Ashrayan-1 Project provided shelter and employment to the homeless.

Hasina was the first prime minister to engage in a "Prime Minister's Question-Answer Time" in the Jatiya Sangsad. The Jatiya Sangsad repealed the Indemnity Act, allowing for the killers of Bangabandhu Sheikh Mujibur Rahman to be prosecuted. The government introduced a four-tier system of local government including the Gram Parishad, Zila Parishad and Upazila Parishad by passing legislation.

The Hasina government liberalised the telecommunications industry, initially granting four licenses to private companies to provide cellular mobile telephone services. This resulted in the previous state monopoly being disbanded meaning prices began to reduce and access became more widespread. The government established the Bangladesh Telecommunication Regulatory Commission to regulate the newly liberalised telecommunications industry.

The government established the National Policy for Women's Advancement which sought to ensure equality between men and women. The policy aimed to guarantee security and employment, create an educated and skilled workforce, eliminate discrimination and repression against women, establish human rights and end poverty and ensure participation in socio-economic development. The government introduced three reserved seats for women in all Union Parishad election in December 1997. Hasina's cabinet approved the National Plan of Action for Children in 1999 to ensure rights and improved upbringing.

Hasina attended the World Micro Credit summit in Washington DC; the World Food Summit in Rome; the Inter-Parliamentary Union Conference in India; the OIC summit in Pakistan; the 9th SAARC summit in the Maldives; the first D-8 summit in Turkey; the 5th World Conference for the Aged in Germany; the Commonwealth summit in the UK and the OIC summit in Iran. Hasina also visited the United States, Saudi Arabia, Japan, the Philippines and Indonesia.

Bangladesh joined two multilateral bodies, the Bay of Bengal Initiative for Multi-Sectoral Technical and Economic Cooperation (BIMSTEC) and D-8 Organization for Economic Cooperation (D-8). She became the first Bangladeshi prime minister since independence to complete an entire five-year term.

In the 2001 general election, despite winning 40% of the popular vote (slightly less than BNP's 41%), the AL won just 62 seats in parliament as a result of the first past-the-post electoral system, while the 'Four Party Alliance' led by BNP won 234 seats, giving them a two-thirds majority in parliament. Hasina herself ran in three constituencies, and was defeated in a constituency in Rangpur, which included her husband's hometown, but won in two other seats. Hasina and the AL rejected the results, claiming that the election was rigged with the assistance of the president and the caretaker government. The international community was largely satisfied with the elections, and the 'Four Party Alliance' went on to form a government.

== Second premiership (2009–2024) ==
=== Second term (2009–2014) ===
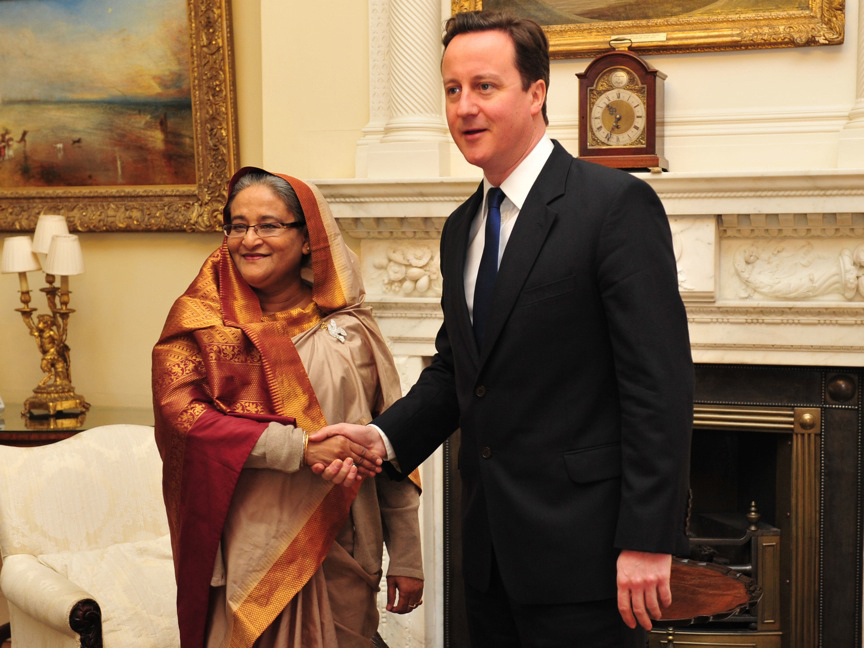
Hasina with British Prime Minister David Cameron at 10 Downing Street (January 2011)

On 6 November 2008, Hasina returned to Bangladesh to contest the 2008 general election scheduled for 29 December. She decided to participate in the parliamentary election under the banner of the "Grand Alliance" with the Jatiya Party, led by Hussain Muhammad Ershad, as its main partner. On 11 December 2008, Hasina formally announced her party's election manifesto during a news conference and vowed to build a "Digital Bangladesh" by 2021.

The AL manifesto was entitled A Charter for Change and included the party's commitment to Vision 2021. The manifesto included pledges to implement measures to reduce price hikes; combat corruption by strengthening the independent ACC and submission of annual wealth statements by influential people; introduction of a long-term policy towards power and energy increasing power generation to 7,000 megawatts by 2013; bringing vibrancy to the agriculture sector and extending the safety net to the poor; creating good governance and curtailing terrorism and religious extremism; prosecution of 1971 war criminals; ensuring an independent and impartial judiciary; reforming the electoral system; strengthening the Human Rights Commission and de-politicising the administration.

Her Awami League and the Grand Alliance (a total of 14 parties) won the 2008 general election with a two-thirds majority, having won 230 out of 299 seats. Khaleda Zia, leader of the BNP-led coalition (4-Party Alliance), rejected the results of the election by accusing the Chief Election Commissioner of "stage-managing the parliamentary election". Hasina was sworn into office as prime minister for a second term on 6 January 2009. Independent observers declared that the elections were held in a festive and peaceful atmosphere.

After being elected prime minister, Hasina reneged on her agreement with the Jatiya Party to make Ershad, its leader, the president.

Hasina removed Awami League central committee members who supported reforms forced by the previous caretaker government. She had to confront a major national crisis in the form of the 2009 Bangladesh Rifles revolt over a pay dispute, which resulted in 56 deaths, including Bangladesh Army officers. Hasina was blamed by the army officers due to her refusal to intervene against the revolt. However, In 2009, a recording emerged of Hasina's private meeting with army officers, who expressed their anger with how she had not reacted more decisively in the revolt's early stages, by ordering an armed raid of the BDR Rifles compound; they believed that her efforts to appease the revolt's leaders delayed needed action which led to more deaths. In a 2011 The Daily Star editorial, she was commended for "her sagacious handling of the situation which resulted in the prevention of a further bloodbath". In 2011, the parliament removed the law that required non-party caretaker government hold elections. In 2012, she maintained a hard-line stance and refused to allow entry to Rohingya refugees fleeing Myanmar during the 2012 Rakhine State riots.

On 27 June 2013, a case against Hasina and 24 other Bangladeshi Ministers and security personnel was lodged at the International Criminal Court (ICC) for the alleged violation of human rights. She has been "credited internationally" for the achievement of some of the United Nations Millennium Development Goals. In 2012 a coup attempt against her by mid-ranking army officers was stopped, with the Bangladesh Army being tipped off by an Indian intelligence agency. The Bangladesh Army described the army officers involved as being Islamist extremists.

In 2012, she had a falling out with Muhammad Yunus, Nobel laureate and founder of Grameen Bank, following a Norwegian documentary that was critical of Yunus's transferring of money from Grameen Bank to an affiliate organisation. Yunus transferred the money back after the documentary aired but it increased scrutiny of the bank by the government and media in Bangladesh. Yunus lost control of his bank following a court verdict. He criticised Hasina and other Bangladeshi politicians. She responded by saying she did not understand why Yunus blamed her when it was a court verdict that removed him from Grameen Bank.

During this term, her government led and succeeded in forming the International Crimes Tribunal, to investigate and prosecute suspects involved in the Bangladesh Genocide, committed by the Pakistan Army and their local collaborators, Razakars, Al-Badr, and Al-Shams during the Bangladesh Liberation War in 1971.

=== Third term (2014–2019) ===
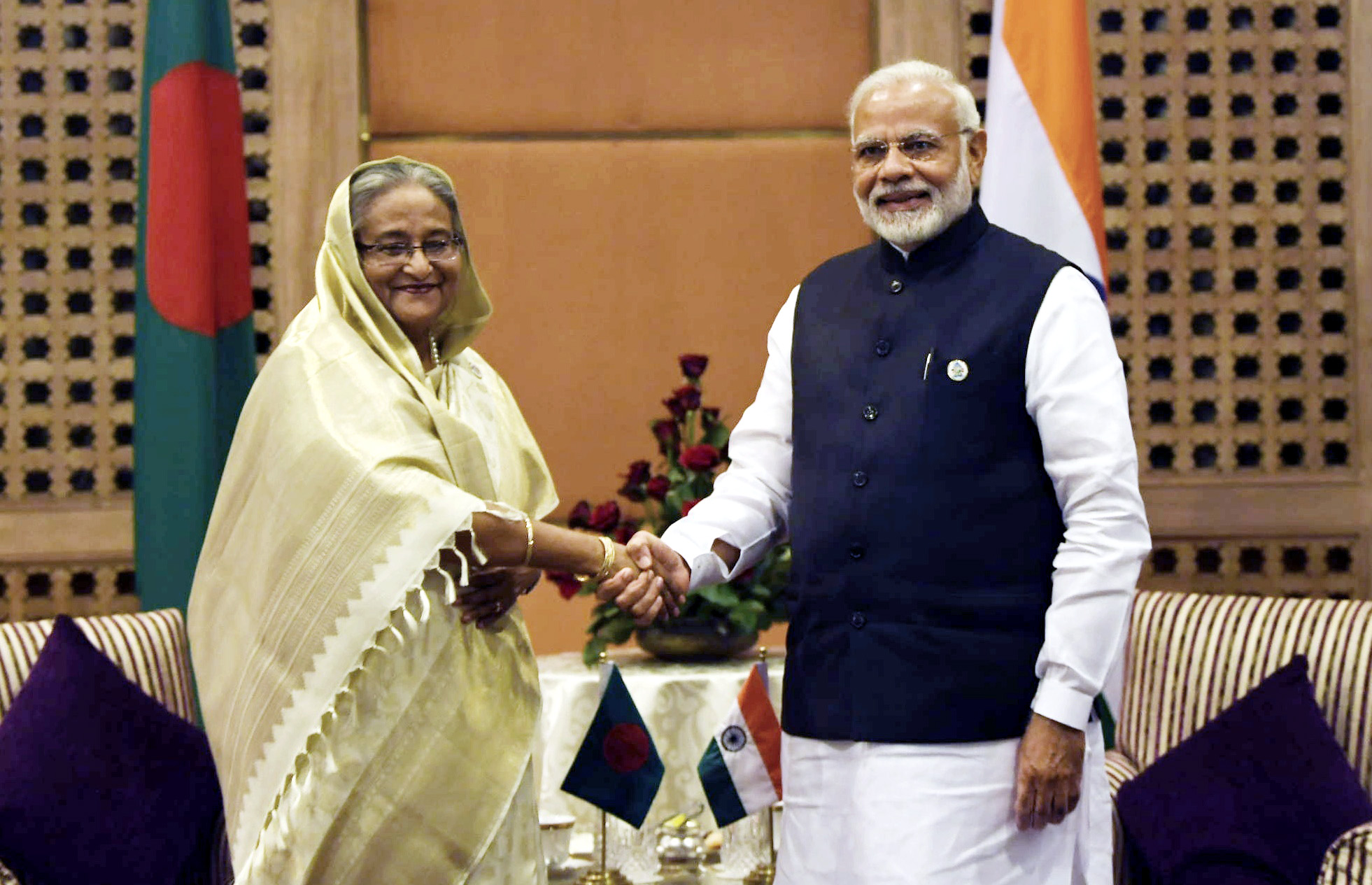
Hasina with Indian Prime Minister Narendra Modi, 2018

Hasina secured a second-consecutive term in office with her ruling Awami League and its Grand Alliance allies, winning the 2014 general election by a landslide. The election was boycotted by leading opposition parties due to unfair conditions and a lack of non-partisan administration to conduct elections. As a result, the AL-led Grand Alliance won 267 seats out of which 153 were uncontested, surpassing its 2008 poll success—when it secured 263 parliamentary seats. Sheikh Hasina's Awami League has run Bangladesh since 2009 and won 288 seats in this election. One of the leading opposition parties accused it of using stuffed ballot boxes. The election was boycotted by major opposition parties including the BNP.

The election was controversial, with reports of violence and an alleged crackdown on the opposition in the run-up to the election. In the election 153 seats (of 300) went uncontested, of which the Awami League won 127 by default. Hasina's Awami League won a safe parliamentary majority with a total of 234 seats. As a result of the boycott and violence, voter turnout was lower than the previous few elections at only 51%. The day after the result, Hasina said that the boycott should "not mean there will be a question of legitimacy. People participated in the poll and other parties participated." Despite the controversy Hasina went on to form a government with Ershad's Jatiya Party (who won 34 seats) as the official opposition.

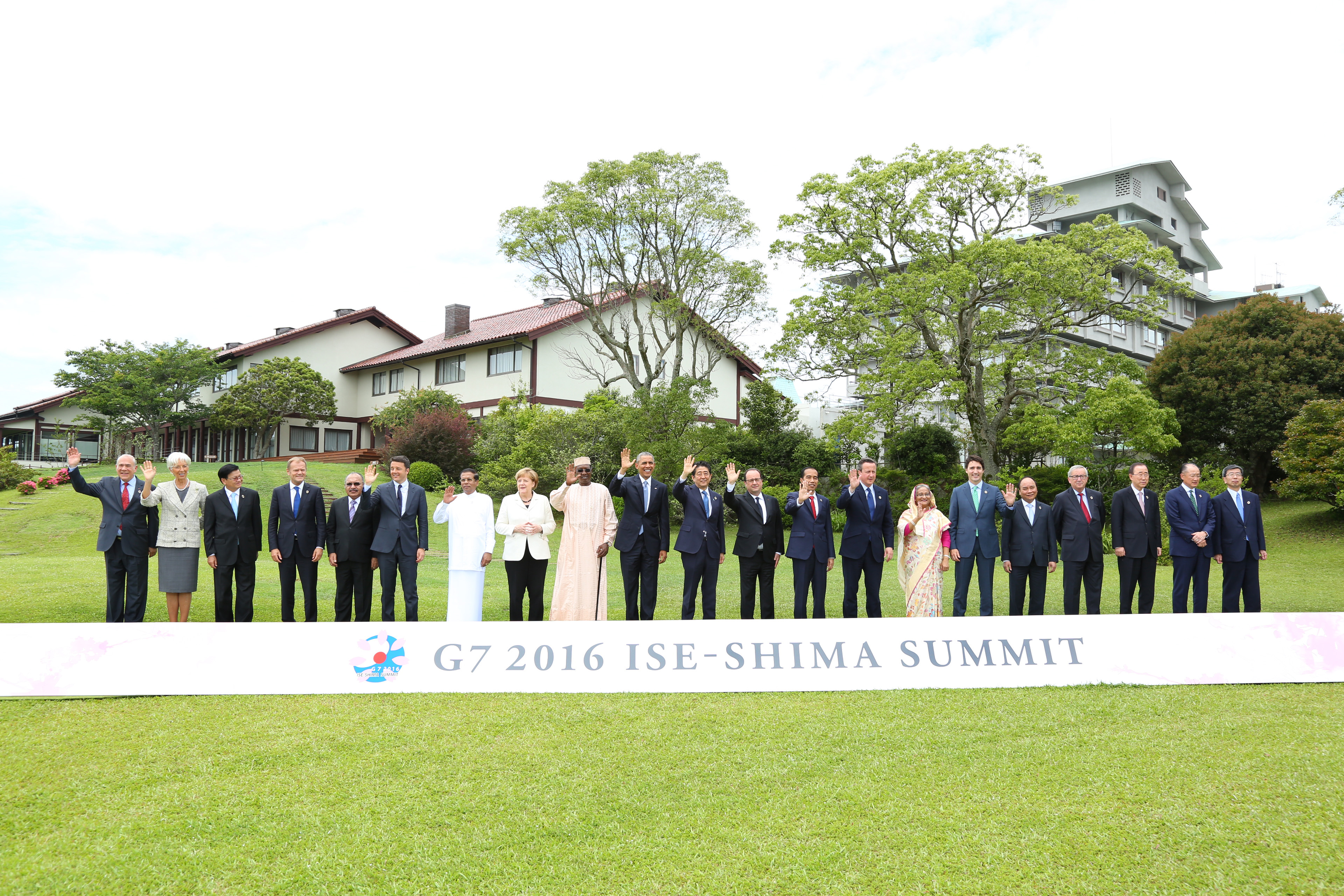
Hasina with G7 Leaders and guests, Shima Kanko Hotel in Japan, 2016

The BNP wanted the elections to be held under a neutral caretaker government and had hoped to use protests to force the government to do so.

The period also saw increasing attacks by Islamic extremists in the country, including the July 2016 Dhaka attack which has been described as "deadliest Islamist attack in Bangladeshi history" by BBC. According to experts, the Hasina-led government's repression of political opposition as well as shrinking democratic and civic space has created "the space for extremist groups to flourish" and "has generated a violent backlash from Islamist groups."

In March 2017, Bangladesh's first two submarines were commissioned. In September 2017, Hasina's government granted refuge and aid to around a million Rohingya refugees and urged Myanmar to end violence against the Rohingya community. The majority of the Bangladeshi people supported the government's decision to provide refugee status to the Rohingya. Hasina received credit and praise for her actions.

Hasina supported calls to remove the Statue of Justice in front of the Supreme Court. This was seen as the government bowing down to the pressure of those who use religion for political ends.

Hasina is a patron of the Asian University for Women, led by Chancellor Cherie Blair, and including the First Lady of Japan, Akie Abe, as well as Irina Bokova, the director-general of UNESCO.

=== Fourth term (2019–2024) ===
Hasina won her third consecutive term, her fourth overall, when her Awami League won 288 of the 300 parliamentary seats. The leader of the main opposition alliance, Kamal Hossain, declared the vote "farcical" and rejected the results. Before the election, Human Rights Watch and other rights organisations had accused the government of creating an intimidating environment for the Opposition. The New York Times editorial board described the election as farcical, the editorial stated that it was likely Hasina would have won without vote-rigging and questioned why she did so.

The BNP, the main opposition party that has been out of power for 12 years and boycotted the 2014 general election, fared extremely poorly. Winning only eight seats, the party and its Jatiya Oikya Front alliance have been marginalised to the weakest opposition ever since Bangladesh's post-Ershad democratic restoration in 1991.

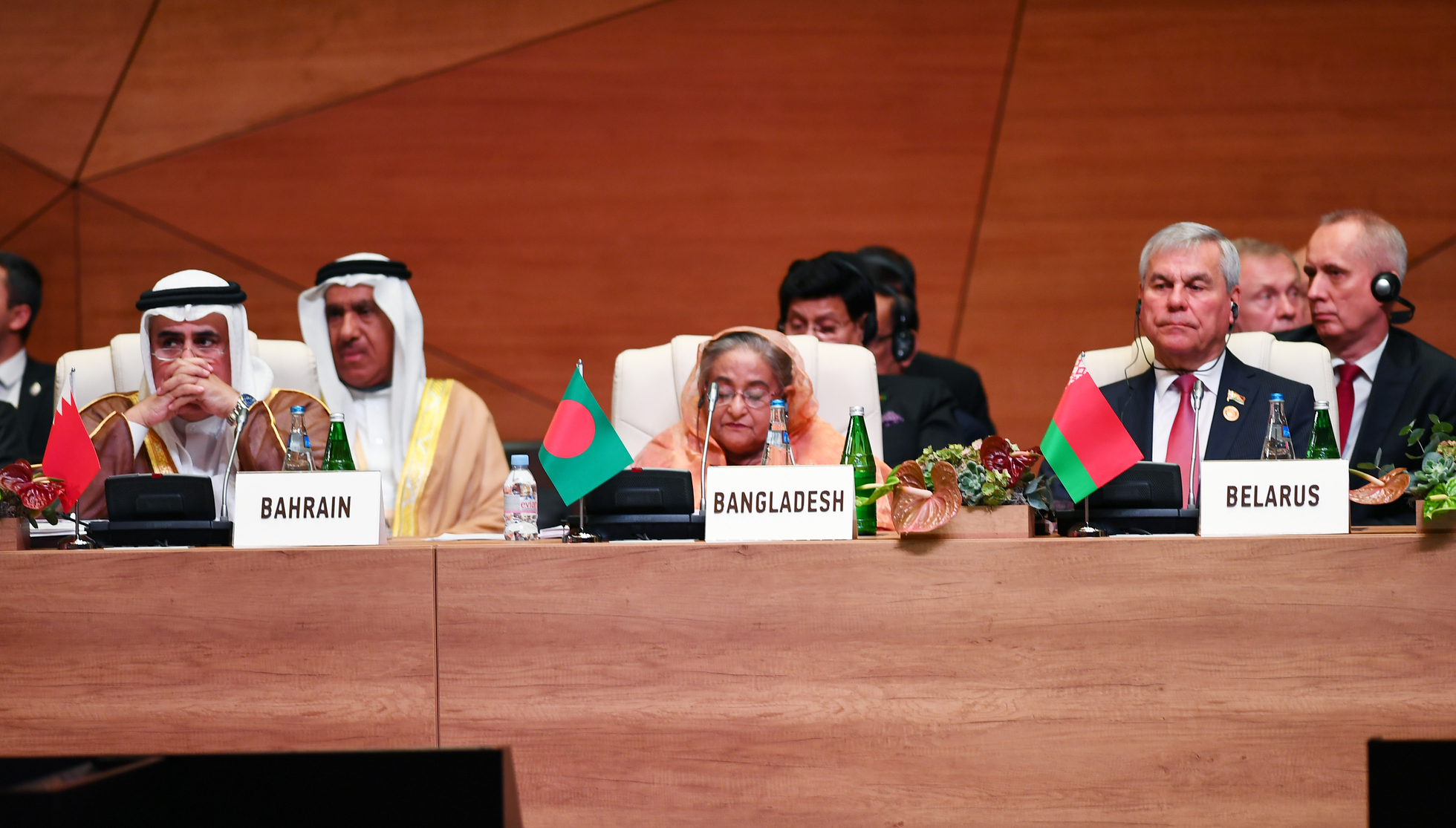
Hasina in the 18th NAM Summit

In May 2021, Hasina provided the inaugural address for the opening of a new headquarters for the Bangladesh Post Office, named the Dak Bhaban. In her address, Hasina urged for further development of the postal service in response to the COVID-19 pandemic in Bangladesh. Developmental measures outlined in the address include continuing the service's digital transformation, and the construction of cooling units in postal warehouses to pave the way for the sending of perishable food by mail.

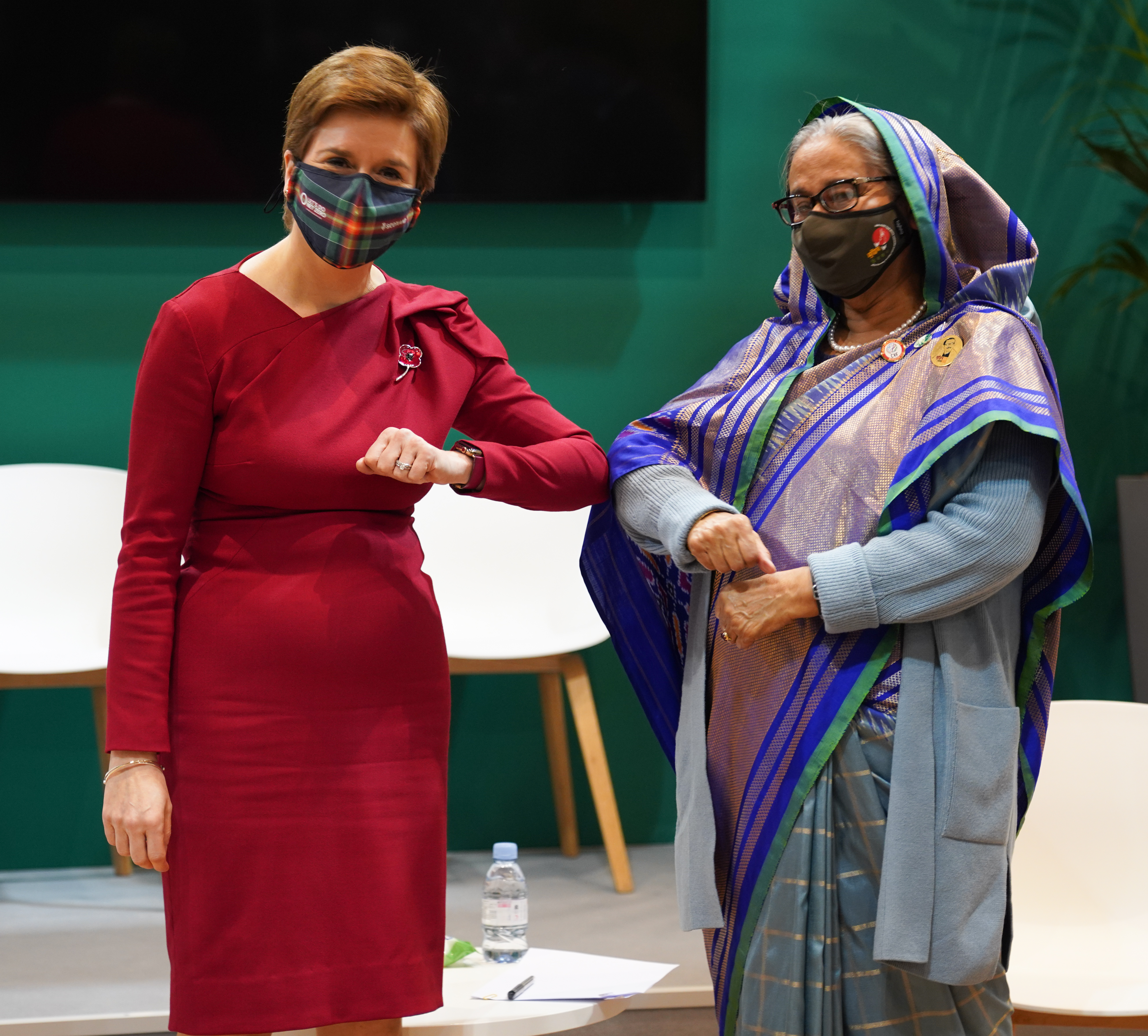
Scottish First Minister Nicola Sturgeon with Hasina in COP26 in 2021

In January 2022, the government passed a law in the Jatiya Sangsad establishing the Universal Pension Scheme. All Bangladeshi citizens, including expatriates, between 18 and 60 years old are eligible to receive a monthly stipend under the scheme.

By the end of fiscal year 2021–22, Bangladesh's external debt reached $95.86 billion, a 238% increase from 2011. The period is also marked by massive irregularities in the banking sector of the country where the amount of default loans went from less than ৳23000 crore (US$1.9 billion) in 2009 to more than ৳250000 crore (US$20 billion) in 2019 according to IMF.

In July 2022, the Finance Ministry requested fiscal assistance from the International Monetary Fund. The government cited depleting foreign-exchange reserves as a result of the sanctions in response to the Russian invasion of Ukraine. A staff level agreement was reached in November 2022 and in January 2023, the IMF agreed to supply a support programme totalling US$4.7 billion, consisting of US$3.3 billion under the Extended Credit Facility and US$1.4 billion under the new Resilience and Sustainability Facility. The IMF stated support package "will help preserve macroeconomic stability, protect the vulnerable and foster inclusive and green growth."

In December 2022, anti-government protests broke out, linked to the rising costs, demanding the resignation of the prime minister.

On 28 December, Hasina opened the first phase of Dhaka Metro Rail, the country's first mass-rapid transit system from Uttara to Agargaon.

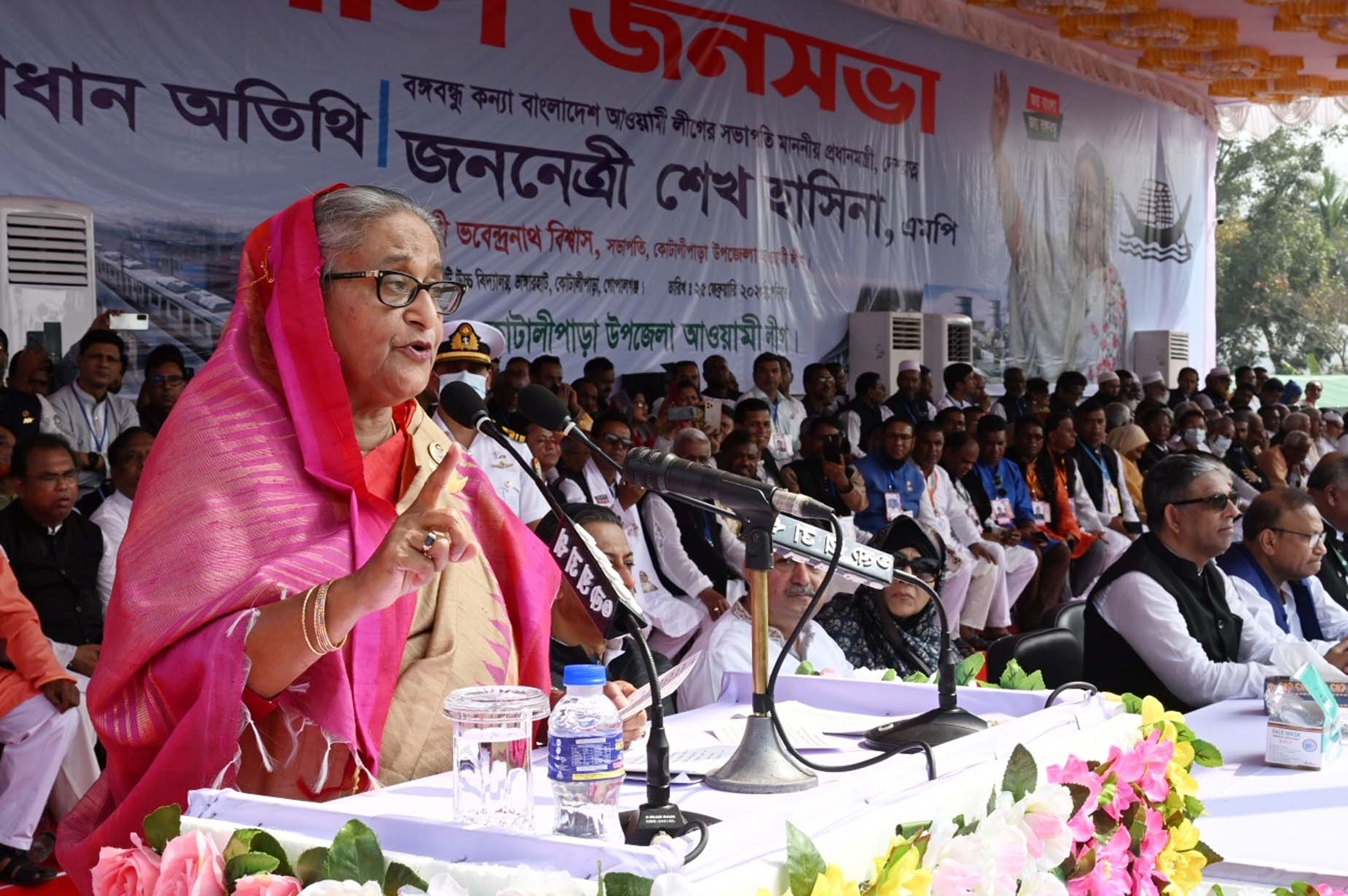
Hasina addressing a party rally in Kotalipara, Gopalganj in February 2023

During the 2023 G20 New Delhi summit, Hasina had a bilateral meeting with Indian prime minister Narendra Modi to discuss diversifying India-Bangladesh cooperation, including areas like connectivity and commercial linkages. She was accompanied by her daughter Saima Wazed, who is a candidate for a WHO election. The summit also provided an opportunity for Hasina to meet other global leaders and strengthen Bangladesh's bilateral ties.

=== Fifth term (2024) ===
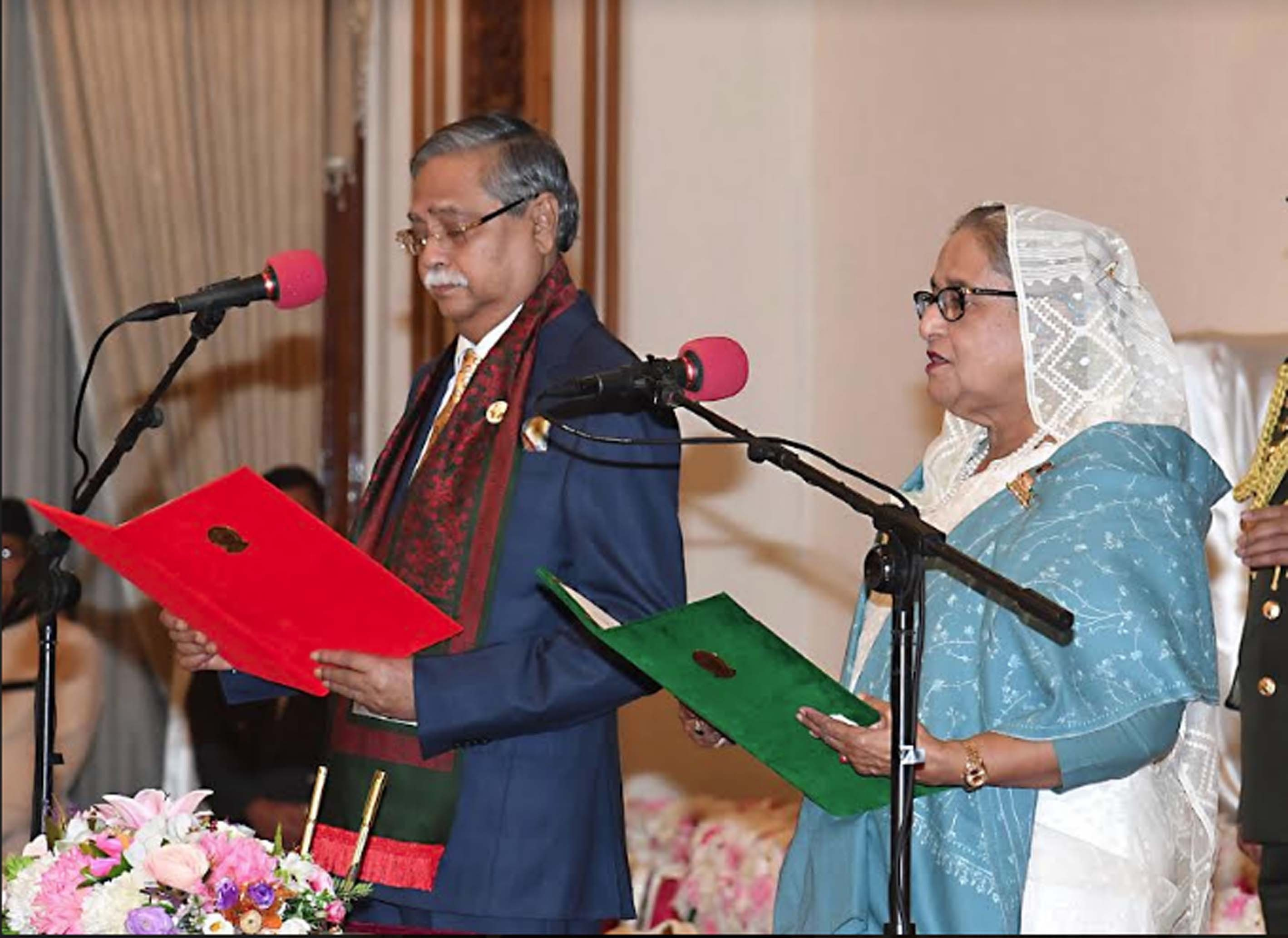
President Mohammed Shahabuddin administered the oath of office to newly appointed Prime Minister Sheikh Hasina at the Darbar Hall of Bangabhaban in Dhaka.

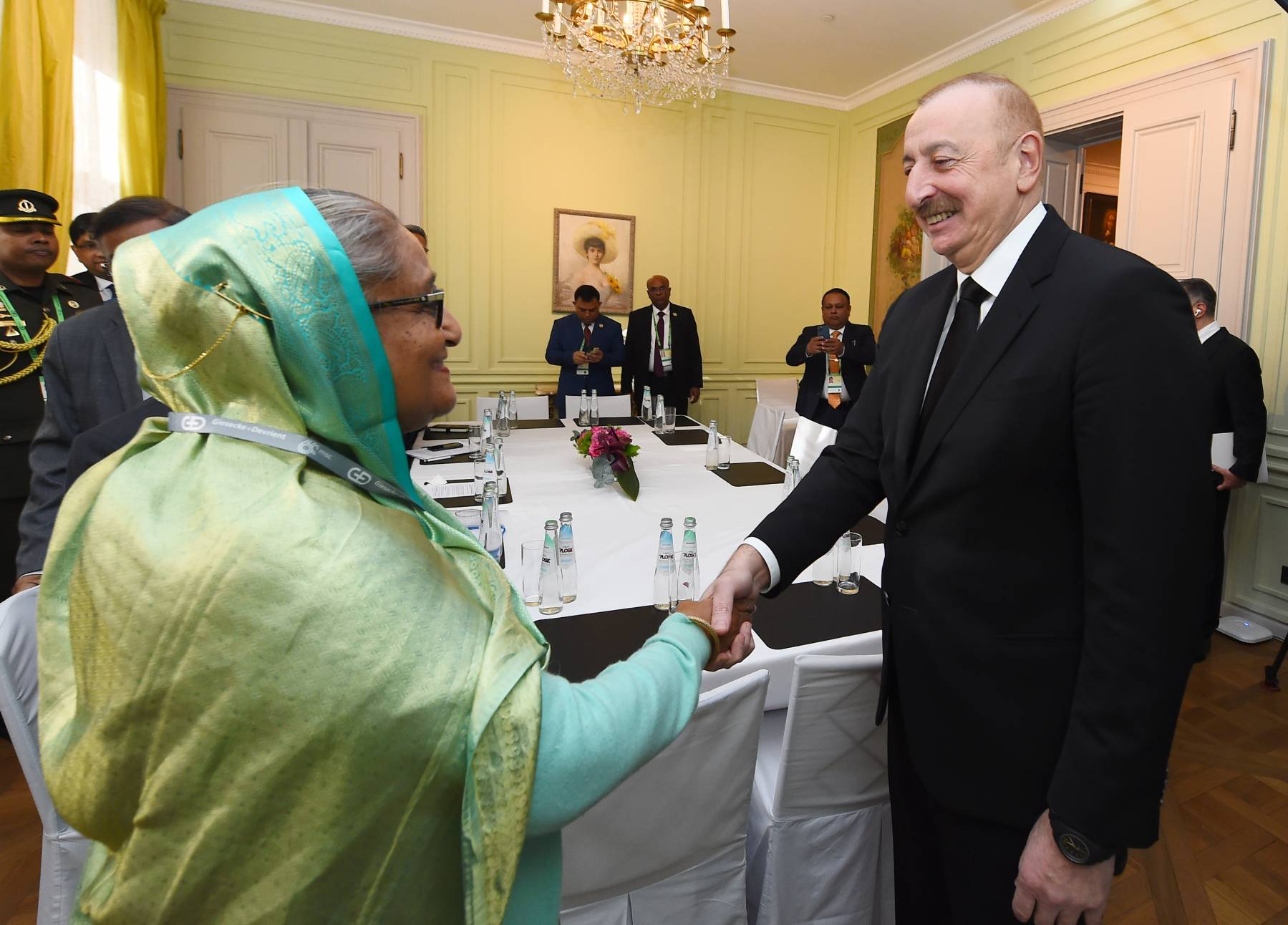
Hasina with Azerbaijani President Ilham Aliyev at the 60th Munich Security Conference in 2024.

In January 2024 Hasina won her fourth consecutive term when her party, the Awami League, won 224 of the 300 parliamentary seats amidst a low voter turnout in an election boycotted by the main opposition. She was inaugurated on 11 January.

In May 2024, Sheikh Hasina claimed that a "white country" was plotting to topple her government and claimed that she would be promised trouble-free elections in January if she allowed a "white country" to set up an airbase in Bangladesh. She also alleged that there was a conspiracy to create a Christian country on the lines of East Timor and Myanmar.

In June 2024, the prime minister Hasina had visited India. In July 2024, at the invitation of the premier of China Li Qiang, Sheikh Hasina paid an official visit to China. As she visited India a month ago, this visit to China is also seen as her attempt to seek opportunities to mediate between China and India.

In the same month of Hasina's state visit to China, protests broke out in support of reforming the quota system. In response, Hasina stated in a press conference,

"If the grandchildren of freedom fighters don't get quota benefits, will those then go to the grandchildren of the Razakars? That's my question to the countrymen."

Protesters interpreted this as her referring to them as Razakars and adopted the title in some of their slogans. The protests later turned violent, involving police, the armed forces, and members of the Awami League, Chhatra League, and Jubo League, resulting in over 2000+ deaths and more than 20,000 injuries. The government then shut down internet access for all non-essential purposes, conducted a massive crackdown on protestors with the help of the armed forces, and imposed a curfew that lasted five days. The Supreme Court agreed to reform the quota system, but the protesters then demanded justice for those killed during the demonstrations and an official apology from Hasina and the resignation of certain ministers they believed were responsible for inciting violence. On 3 August, the protest organisers issued a single demand and announced a non-cooperation movement, calling for the resignation of Hasina and her entire cabinet.

==== Resignation and flight from Bangladesh ====
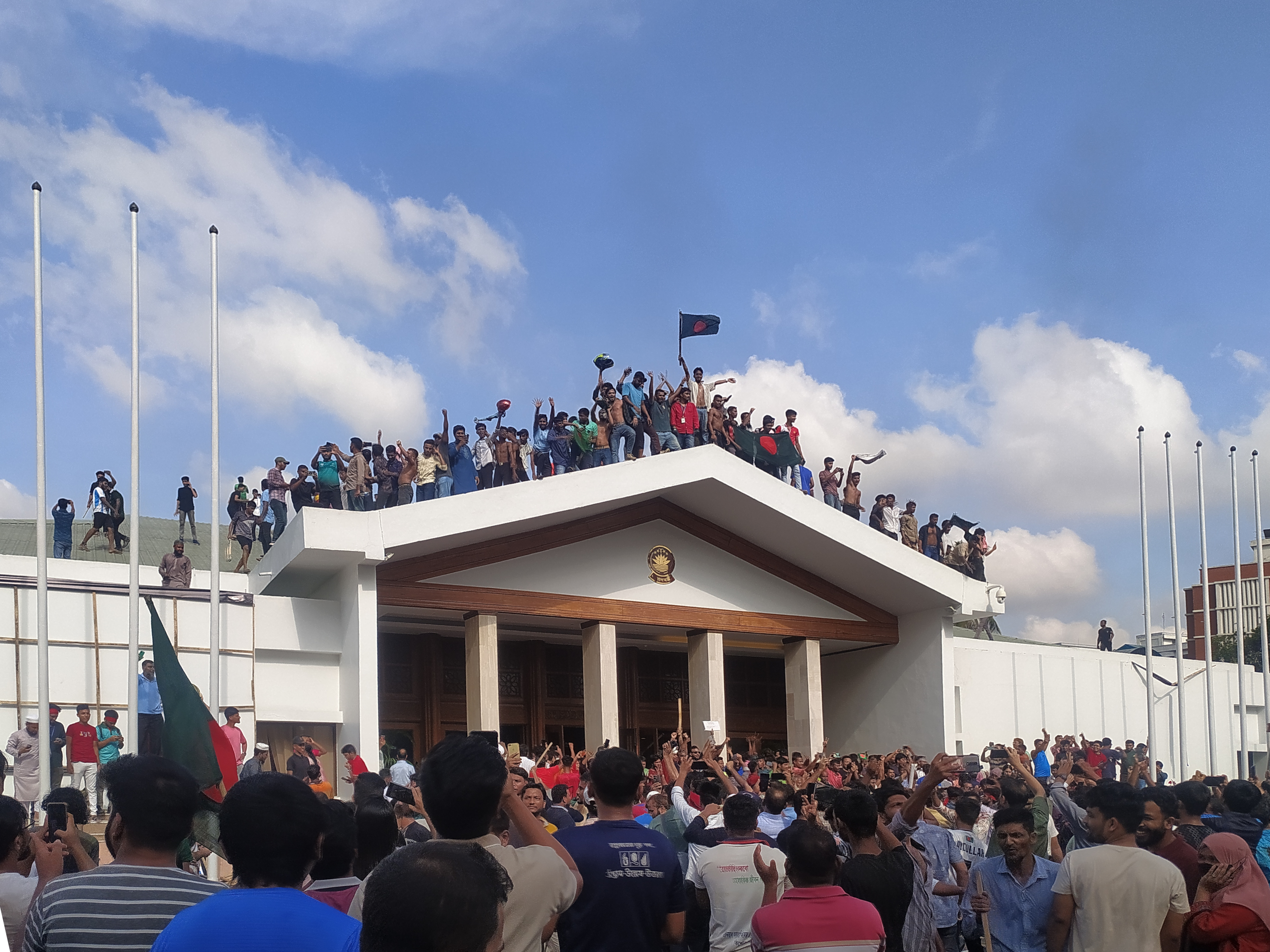
People cheering in front of the Prime Minister's Office, after Sheikh Hasina's resignation

Hasina resigned on 5 August 2024, as large crowds of demonstrators surrounded the prime minister's residence. Her resignation was announced by General Waker-uz-Zaman, the Chief of the Army Staff. (Note: Multiple references:) Later that day, Hasina fled to India in a chaotic departure, first by car, then by helicopter, and finally by plane. She left with no resignation speech.

Hasina reportedly flew in a Bangladesh Air Force C-130 transport to Hindon Air Force base in Ghaziabad, India, where she was received by the Indian national security advisor Ajit Doval along with other senior military officials. (Note: Multiple references: to India.) Indian foreign minister S. Jaishankar told the Parliament, "At very short notice, she requested approval to come for the moment to India." Her son, Sajeeb Wazed, initially said that she would not return to politics and planned to "stay in Delhi for a little while" before her next destination, but subsequently said on 7 August that she and the Awami League would remain active in the Bangladeshi political scene and that she would return to the country once elections were declared. He also insisted that Sheikh Hasina was still the prime minister, saying that she was unable to formally submit her resignation after being forced to flee from the protesters. Hasina had hoped to go to London, but the United Kingdom reportedly rebuffed initial overtures seeking political asylum. She reportedly considered seeking temporary residence in the United Arab Emirates, Saudi Arabia, Belarus, or Qatar. Because her nephew lives in Finland, that country was speculated as a possible destination. Although Sajeeb Wazed lives in the U.S., she is considered unlikely to seek asylum there, as the U.S. government criticized her rule in Bangladesh.

Hasina was living in a secret location in India under tight security as of August 2024. Sajeeb Wazed said that the protests which led to her resignation had support from a foreign intelligence agency, without naming any country. In a statement published in the Indian media on 11 August, she accused the United States of influencing her resignation, and previously accused the United States of conspiring to oust her in the Jatiya Sangsad. However, Wazed called the statement "false and fabricated" and said Hasina "did not give any statement before or after leaving Dhaka". The White House also denied allegations of any US involvement. On 13 August, Hasina released her first confirmed statements since her overthrow published by Wazed Joy calling for an investigation into the killings made during the protests, while insisting that police and the Awami League were also victims of "terrorist aggression".

== Controversies ==
=== July massacre ===
The July massacre was one of the most violent crackdowns in Bangladesh's history, ordered by Sheikh Hasina's government to suppress 2024 Bangladesh quota reform movement. The protest began as a peaceful demonstration demanding reforms of the quota system, but it quickly escalated into a nationwide movement. In July 2024, security forces, including the Rapid Action Battalion (RAB) and police, opened fire on unarmed students, many of whom were between the ages of 5 and 30 years old. Quota reform movement later escalated into the July Uprising that overthrown Hasina. On 5 August 2024 she was forced to resign and fled to neighboring country India.

The interim government officially reported 875 deaths. Many more were injured or arrested. Witnesses reported that government forces used excessive force, including live ammunition and tear gas, in areas where peaceful protests were ongoing.

The massacre drew widespread condemnation from both domestic and international bodies, with Human Rights Watch and Amnesty International calling for independent investigations into the killings. The government has been accused of trying to cover up the true extent of the violence by pressuring hospitals to underreport casualties and censoring media coverage.

=== Election manipulation ===
Sheikh Hasina's government has faced repeated allegations of manipulating elections to maintain power. The 2014 general election, boycotted by the opposition Bangladesh Nationalist Party (BNP), led to a one-sided result, with the ruling Awami League winning most seats uncontested. Similar accusations surfaced in the 2018 election, with widespread reports of vote rigging and obstruction of opposition voters.

=== Suppression of opposition and media ===
Under Hasina's government, opposition leaders, particularly from the BNP, have been frequently arrested or harassed. The imprisonment of BNP leader Khaleda Zia on corruption charges is seen by many as a politically motivated move to weaken the opposition. Hasina's government has also cracked down on media freedom, using laws like the Digital Security Act to detain journalists and activists critical of the regime.

=== Extrajudicial arrests, disappearances and killings ===
Human rights groups have condemned Sheikh Hasina's government for its use of midnight arrests and enforced disappearances, particularly targeting political opponents, activists, and journalists. Security forces like the Rapid Action Battalion (RAB) are accused of abducting individuals from their homes during the night, many of whom were never seen again. Victims of these disappearances often included opposition members or activists who were critical of the regime. These practices have led to international outcry, with the United States imposing sanctions on RAB in 2021 for its involvement in human rights violations.

=== Corruption ===
On 9 April 2012, Railway Minister Suranjit Sengupta's assistant personal secretary, general manager of the eastern region, and commandant of security were driving to Suranjit's residence with 7.4 million taka of bribe money, when the driver Azam Khan turned them in.

In 2012, World Bank alleged that Syed Abul Hossain was one of the corruption conspirators in the Padma Bridge Scandal. He resigned from his office on 23 July 2012. Former state minister for foreign affairs and MP of Awami League Abul Hasan Chowdhury was also involved in that corruption plot. Another person involved in this case was Mujibur Rahman Chowdhury. He is the nephew of Sheikh Hasina, a member of parliament, and also a civil contractor. SNC-Lavalin admitted to bribing him in order to obtain contracts Soon after the case emanated, Sheikh Hasina disavowed her nephew and campaigned for his opponent during the 2014 Bangladeshi general election.

On 29 August 2012, Anti Corruption Commission of Bangladesh said that they have the information that Syed Modasser Ali, adviser to the prime minister Sheikh Hasina, allegedly influenced Sonali Bank authorities into granting scam loan to the controversial Hallmark Group.

On 24 April 2013, a commercial building named Rana Plaza in Savar, Dhaka, Bangladesh collapsed due to structural failure. That building was owned by Sohel Rana, a Jubo League (youth wing of Bangladesh Awami League) leader.

On 27 April 2014, the incident named Narayanganj Seven murder occurred. The main plotter of that incident, Nur Hossain, was the vice-president of Siddhirganj Awami League.

On 15 October 2015, Awami League MP Manjurul Islam Liton was arrested for shooting a 9-year-old boy named Shahadat Hossain Shoura.

On 10 April 2016, Bangladesh Supreme Court Appellate Division upheld 13-year jail to former minister of Disaster Management and Relief Mofazzal Hossain Chowdhury Maya rejecting his review plea seeking acquittal in graft case.

In November 2016, Awami League MP Abdur Rahman Bodi was sentenced to three years of prison and fined US$1 million for illegally amassing and hiding wealth of US$100 million.

On 13 July 2017, Gazi Tarique Salman, a civil servant (UNO) was harassed by police, local administration, and local Awami League leader Obaidullah Saju.

Even though Swiss National Bank (SNB)'s data published on 29 June 2017 shows that Bangladesh has BDT 4423,00,00,00,000 in Swiss banks which is an increase by 20% since 2013–14, Bangladesh's minister of finance Abul Mal Abdul Muhit said that "Media exaggerated rise of Bangladeshi deposit in Swiss banks"

Bangladesh's anti-corruption commissioner filed cases against former prime minister Sheikh Hasina and 49 ex-ministers for siphoning more than $150 billion to various countries, including India, Hong Kong, Switzerland, Luxembourg, Singapore, Malaysia, UAE, Australia, UK, USA, and New Zealand. Former prime minister Sheikh Hasina, her son Sajeeb Wazed and niece Tulip Siddiq accused of embezzling more than $5 billion from Rooppur nuclear power plant project that costs Bangladeshi tax payers $12.65 billion.

Al Jazeera's Investigation Exposed Bangladesh's Minister Saifuzzaman Chowdhury's exclusive property portfolio in Dubai, London, New York, San Francisco, and New Jersey. According to undercover video recordings of the Al Jazeera investigation unit, former prime minister Sheikh Hasina knew all along about Mr Chowdhury's corruption.

=== Renaming of public institutions and allegations of dynastic politics ===
A prominent point of criticism during Sheikh Hasina's tenure has been the renaming of infrastructure, institutions, and public spaces in honor of her family members, particularly her father, Sheikh Mujibur Rahman, the founding leader of Bangladesh. Major projects, such as the Bangabandhu Sheikh Mujib Medical University, have either been renamed or established in his name. This practice has also extended to other family members, prompting critics to accuse Hasina of fostering a cult of personality and reinforcing dynastic politics.

== See also ==
- List of prime ministers of Bangladesh
- Politics of Bangladesh
- Premiership of Sheikh Mujibur Rahman
- Presidency of Ziaur Rahman
- Premiership of Khaleda Zia
- Interim government of Muhammad Yunus

== Notes ==
Bangladeshi Premierships
Preceded by 1996: Habibur; 2008: Fakhruddin	Hasina Premiership; 1996–2001; 2008-2024	Succeeded by 2001: Latifur; 2024: Yunus
