= Delwar Hossain =

Delwar Hossain (Bengali: দেলোয়ার হোসেন, also spelt Dilwar Hussain) is a Bengali masculine given name. It may refer to:

- Meerza Delawar Hosaen Ahmed (1840–1913), Bengali magistrate who was the first Muslim graduate in the British Raj
- Khandaker Delwar Hossain (1933–2011), 8th General Secretary of Bangladesh Nationalist Party
- Delwar Hossain (1934–2020), Bangladeshi politician from Faridpur
- Delwar Hossain Sayeedi (1940–2023), Bangladeshi Islamic scholar and politician
- Delwar Hossain Khan (1947–2020), former president of Bangladesh Labour Federation
- Delwar Hossain (1955–2023), Bangladeshi politician from Barguna
- Delwoar Hossain (1970–2020), Bangladeshi executive engineer
- Dilwar Hussain (born 1970), British-Bangladeshi academic and consultant
- Delwar Hossain (born 1985), Bangladeshi cricketer
- Delwar Hossain Khan Dulu, Bangladeshi politician
- Md. Delwar Hossain, Bangladeshi politician from Mymensingh
- Md. Delwar Hossain (judge), a judge of the High Court Division

== See also ==
- Mohammad Delwar Hossain (1945– 1981), Bangladesh Army colonel
- Saint Dilwar, a Welsh saint
- Baramaricha Delwar Hossain High School, West Bengal
- Dilawar (disambiguation)
