= Dilawar =

Dilawar may refer to:

== People ==
- Dilawar Khan Ghauri (reigned 1401), sultan of Malwa
- Dilwar Khan (1585–1666), independent ruler of Sandwip
- Dilawar Figar (1926–1998), Urdu poet, known for his poetry and style of presentation
- Dilwar Khan (1937–2013), Bangladeshi poet
- Delwar Jahan Jhantu (born 1948), Bangladeshi film director, producer and screenwriter
- Dilawar (torture victim) (1979–2002), Afghan tortured to death by American forces
- Dilawar Mani, Pakistani cricket administrator
- Delwar Hossain (disambiguation), multiple people

== Places ==
- Saint Dilwar, a Welsh saint
- Dilawar, Punjab, a village in the Punjab province of Pakistan
- Dilawar Cheema, a town in Gujranwala, Pakistan

== See also ==
- Dilwar (disambiguation)
