= Judiciary of Bangladesh =

Bangladeshi judicial system

- Motto: "বিসমিল্লাহির রাহমানির রাহিম" 'بِسْمِ ٱللَّٰهِ ٱلرَّحْمَٰنِ ٱلرَّحِيمِ "In the name of God, the Most Gracious, the Most Merciful"

Service overview
- Formerly known as: Federal Judiciary
- Founded: 16 December 1971; 54 years ago
- Country: Bangladesh
- Training Institute: Judicial Administration Training Institute
- Controlling authority: Supreme Court of Bangladesh
- Legal personality: Judiciary
- Duties: Justice Administration; Public Interest Litigation; Guardian of the Constitution
- Hierarchy of Courts in Bangladesh: 1. Supreme Court; 2. District Court; 3. Metropolitan Court
- Post Designation: Justice; Judge; Magistrate - Judicial and Executive
- Cadre strength: 1,360 Judges (6 in the Appellate Division, 86 in the High Court Division, 1,268 in Lower Courts)
- Selection / Appointment: President of Bangladesh
- Salary: ৳ 30,935-142,000
- Associations: Bangladesh Judicial Service Association

Head of Judiciary
- Chief Justice of Bangladesh: Zubayer Rahman Chowdhury

The Judiciary of Bangladesh (Bengali: বাংলাদেশের বিচার বিভাগ — Bānlādēśēra bicāra bibhāga) or Judicial system of Bangladesh (Bengali: বাংলাদেশের বিচার ব্যবস্থা — Bānlādēśēra bicāra byabasthā) is based on the Constitution, along with laws enacted by the legislature and judicial precedents established by the Supreme Court of Bangladesh, which is the highest court in the country. The jurisdiction of the Supreme Court has been described in Article 94(1) of the Constitution of Bangladesh. It consists of two divisions, namely the High Court Division and the Appellate Division. These two divisions of the Supreme Court have separate jurisdictions.

According to a report, the Bangladeshi judiciary faces a severe shortage of judges. As of July 2017, 1,268 judges deal with over 2.7 million cases in lower courts, 86 High Court Division judges deal with 431,000 cases and 6 Appellate Division judges deal with 13,000 cases.

== Supreme Court ==
=== Chief Justice ===
The Chief Justice of Bangladesh is the highest-ranking judge of the Supreme Court of Bangladesh and the head of the country's judiciary, overseeing both the Supreme Court and all subordinate courts. The chief justice is appointed by the President of Bangladesh. The Chief Justice sits in the Appellate Division of the Supreme Court with other judges to hear and decide cases, presides over meetings of the full Supreme Court to transact business relating to administration of the court, and supervises the discipline of the judges and magistrates of the subordinate courts.

=== Appellate Division ===
The Supreme Court of Bangladesh has two divisions: the Appellate Division and the High Court Division. The Appellate Division hears both civil and criminal appeals from the High Court Division. The Appellate Division may also decide a point of law reserved for its decision by the High Court Division, as well as any point of law of public interest arising in the course of an appeal from a subordinate court to the High Court Division, which has been reserved by the High Court Division for the decision of the Appellate Division.

=== High Court Division ===
Article 101 of the Constitution provides that the High Court Division shall have such original, appellate and other jurisdictions, powers and functions as are or may be conferred on it by the Constitution or any other law.

== District Courts ==
=== Civil Courts ===
Under section 3 of the Civil Courts Act, 1887, five civil courts exist in the following hierarchy:

- District Judge Court
- Additional District Judge Court
- Joint District Judge Court
- Senior Assistant Judge Court
- Assistant Judge Court

=== Criminal Courts ===
According to section 6 of the Code of Criminal Procedure, there are two types of criminal courts: the Court of Sessions and the Court of Magistrates.

==== Sessions Courts ====
- Sessions Judge Court
- Additional Sessions Judge Court
- Joint Sessions Judge Court

==== Magistrate Courts ====
- Chief Judicial Magistrate Court
- Additional Chief Judicial Magistrate Court
- Senior Judicial Magistrate Court
- Judicial Magistrate Court

== City Criminal Courts ==
The Code of Criminal Procedure provides for the establishment of separate metropolitan courts in metropolitan areas. As of 2024, the only cities in Bangladesh that have metropolitan courts are Dhaka, Chittagong, Rajshahi, Khulna, Sylhet, Barisal, Rangpur and Gazipur.

Metropolitan courts generally deal with criminal offenses committed within metropolitan areas. Currently, metropolitan sessions courts and metropolitan magistrate courts are in operation Metropolitan cities. These courts do not have jurisdiction over civil matters.

=== Metropolitan Sessions Courts ===
- Metropolitan Sessions Judge Court
- Additional Metropolitan Sessions Judge Court
- Joint Metropolitan Sessions Judge Court:

=== Metropolitan Magistrates Courts ===
- Chief Metropolitan Magistrate Court
- Additional Chief Metropolitan Magistrate Court
- Metropolitan Magistrate Court

== Specialized Courts and Tribunals ==
Alongside the regular courts, several special courts and tribunals function under various statutory laws to adjudicate specific types of disputes or offenses.

- Constitutional Court
  - None
- Administrative Court
  - Administrative Tribunals
- Finance Court
  - Money Loan Courts
  - Insolvency Courts
  - Income Tax Appellate Tribunals
  - Special Tribunal for Share Market Scam
- Labour Court
  - Labour Courts
  - Labour Appellate Tribunal
- Court of Justice
  - International Crimes Tribunal
- Social Court
  - Speedy Trial Tribunal
  - Cyber Tribunal

== Bangladesh Judicial Service Association ==
Bangladesh Judicial Service Association (BJSA) (Bengali: বাংলাদেশ জুডিসিয়াল সার্ভিস এসোসিয়েশন (বিজেএসএ)) is a professional association of judges and magistrates of Bangladesh. The Association headquarters is located at Dhanmondi, Dhaka.

Md. Helal Chowdhury, the District and Sessions Judge Dhaka, is the current President and Bikash Kumar Saha, Joint Secretary at the Ministry of Law, Justice and Parliamentary Affairs, is the Secretary-General of the Association.

== Judicial corruption ==
The Bangladeshi judicial system is inefficient and under the influence of the executive branch. Political appointments, promotions, and firings are routine, and it can be difficult to enforce contracts and resolve disputes. Prosecutors, who earn only $37.50 a month, are especially susceptible to bribery.

In 2010, Judiciary of Bangladesh was ranked as the most corrupt institution of the country. The most prominent aspect of the judiciary of Bangladesh is, it is not an independent institution of the state in that both judiciary and the executive branch of the government are overlapped. Bangladesh's Judicial system is infested by partisanship, governmental or political influence, judicial corruption, delays in verdicts, and abuse of power.

==== Judges ====
On 3 March 2007, University of Chittagong revoked the LLB certificate of the judge Faisal Mahmud Faizee and seventy others for tampering with their mark-sheets, asking them to immediately return their certificates.

On 26 July 2014, it has been reported that three senior judges, AKM Ishtiaque Hussain, Md Mizanur Rahman, Salauddin Mohammad Akram, would lose their jobs because of various types of corruptions.

On 14 August 2016, Bangladesh Ministry of Law said that they have started the process of dismissing four judges, SM Aminul Islam, Ruhul Amin Khandaker, Sirajul Islam and Moinul Haque, for grave corruptions.

==== Impunity ====
Bangladesh has a huge backlog of unresolved cases both civil and criminal. Political clout is believed to be the main factor behind most of the unsolved murder cases.

According to Global Impunity Index of CJP published on 27 October 2016, Bangladesh occupies 11th position in the list where journalists are slain and killers go free.

==== Politics of trial ====
In Bangladesh, generally the government files politically motivated cases against the opposition, and these cases get withdrawn or quashed when the opposition takes control of the government in turn.
