= Metropolitan courts in Bangladesh =

Criminal courts

Metropolitan Courts are criminal courts established in metropolitan cities of Bangladesh. Their constitution, procedures, and jurisdiction are governed by the Criminal Procedure Code of 1898. The Code originally recognised two primary classes of criminal courts: courts of sessions and courts of magistrates.

After the commencement of Metropolitan Police in 1976, the Code was revised in 1976 by an Ordinance and became effective in 1979. As indicated by the revised law, the government was required to establish separate metropolitan courts in designated metropolitan cities. Following this revision, the Code of Criminal Procedure currently recognizes two types of judicature based on the location of their establishment: District Courts, which are situated in Districts, and the Metropolitan Courts, which are established in Metropolitan areas. As of 2024, the only cities in Bangladesh that have metropolitan courts are Dhaka, Chittagong, Rajshahi, Khulna, Sylhet, Barisal, Rangpur and Gazipur.

== Classification ==
Generally, a metropolitan court deals with criminal offenses committed within the metropolitan area. Metropolitan courts do not deal with civil cases. There are two types of metropolitan courts in Bangladesh:

- metropolitan sessions courts
- metropolitan magistrate courts

=== Metropolitan sessions courts ===
Metropolitan sessions courts are presided over by sessions judges. It has started functioning in 1999. There are two additional types of sessions judge courts namely, additional metropolitan sessions judge courts and joint metropolitan sessions judge courts.

=== Metropolitan magistrate courts ===
Metropolitan magistrate courts are presided over by judicial magistrates, who are appointed by the government. These magistrates work under the supervision of the sessions judge. There are three types of metropolitan magistrate courts:

- chief metropolitan magistrate courts
- additional chief metropolitan magistrate courts
- metropolitan magistrate courts (1st class)

== See also ==
- Judiciary of Bangladesh
