= Dilwar =

Dilwar may refer to:

- Dilwar Khan (1937–2013), Bangladeshi poet
- Dilwar Khan (1585-1666), Muslim ruler of Sandwip
- Dilwar Hussain (born 1970), British academic and consultant on social policy, Muslim identity and Islamic reform
- Dilwar, a 2019 Indian Bhojpuri-language film starring Sanjay Pandey
- Saint Dilwar, a Welsh saint
- Delvar, a city in Bushehr province, Iran

== See also ==
- Dilawar (disambiguation)
- Dilbar (disambiguation)
