= Dilbar =

Dilbar (from Persian دلبر meaning ‘beloved’) may refer to:

- Dilbar (film), a 1994 Bollywood film
- "Dilbar" (song), a song by Alka Yagnik and Vinod Rathod from the 1999 Indian film Sirf Tum
- Dilbar (yacht), a yacht launched in 2015
- Al Raya (yacht), formerly Dilbar, a yacht launched in 2008
- Dilbar, a given name, notably borne by
  - Dilbar Hussain, Pakistani cricketer
- Delvar, also known as Dilbār, a city in Iran

== See also ==
- Delbar (disambiguation)
- Dilwar (disambiguation)
