= Hallmark-Sonali Bank Loan Scam =

2010–2012 corruption scandal in the Bangladesh

The Hallmark-Sonali Bank loan scam is a massive loan fraud that took place in Bangladesh between 2010 and 2012. State owned Sonali Bank's Ruposhi Bangla Hotel branch lent over 35 billion Bangladeshi taka ($454 million as of 2011) based on falsified documents. Little-known company Hallmark Group received the majority, nearly Tk 27bn ($344M), with the remaining loans spread among five other companies: T and Brothers, Paragon Group, Nakshi Knit, DN Sports, and Khanjahan Ali. An investigation by Bangladesh Bank, the country's central bank, concluded that the borrowers conspired with senior officials at Sonali Bank to embezzle the funds. The Economist described the 2012 scam as Bangladesh's "biggest of many banking scandals since the banks were nationalised 40 years before".

== Background ==
In 1972, after the Bangladesh Liberation War, Sonali Bank was formed by the amalgamation and nationalisation of the National Bank of Pakistan, Bank of Bahawalpur, and Premier Bank branches located in the former East Pakistan. It is the largest state owned commercial bank in Bangladesh.

The perceived level of public sector corruption has consistently placed the country in the worst quartile of Transparency International's Corruption Perceptions Index. One form this rampant corruption takes is senior officials in public sector banks making imprudent loans to well-connected private companies. State-owned banks are a major originator of bad loans to the private sector.

== See also ==
- Corruption in Bangladesh
- Padma Bridge Scandal
- 2011 Bangladesh share market scam
