= Ghush.site =

Bangladeshi online platform for reporting alleged bribery

- Founded: 21 August 2026
- Founder: Shahed Sharif Ahmed, Saif Kabeer
- Type: Online platform
- Official language: Bengali, English
- Website: www.ghush.site

Ghush.site (Bengali: ঘুষ.সাইট) is an online platform based in Bangladesh where users can anonymously report alleged demands for bribes in public services. It was launched on 21 August 2026 by Shahed Sharif Ahmed and Saif Kabeer. Submissions are reviewed before publication but are not independently verified.

== Background ==
Shahed Sharif Ahmed's interest in creating Ghush.site followed an experience involving money payable to his family after his mother's death. According to reports, he was asked to pay a bribe during the process. He subsequently developed the website as a platform for people to report similar experiences with public services.

Shahed was 17 when he developed the initial version of the website with Saif Kabeer. Prothom Alo reported that the development cost was about Tk 10,000. The platform received thousands of submissions within days of its launch, according to reports from Bangladeshi news organisations.

== Operation ==
The submission form asks users to provide information about the government office involved, the service sought, the location, the amount allegedly demanded and the outcome. Users do not need an account to submit a report. Submissions are reviewed before publication, but the platform does not independently verify the allegations. The names of accused officials are not published.

The founders have said that the site is intended to document patterns in alleged bribery rather than investigate individual cases. They have also said that it is not intended to replace investigations by government authorities or the Anti-Corruption Commission.

== Submissions ==
Prothom Alo reported 804 submissions involving alleged bribe demands totalling Tk 13.65 crore in the first two days after the platform's launch. Dhaka Tribune reported 2,709 submissions involving Tk 35.17 crore within three days, while Daily Sun reported 4,361 submissions involving Tk 79.66 crore after four days.

By the end of August, Prothom Alo reported 9,665 submissions. Bangla Tribune reported more than 10,000 submissions involving alleged bribe demands exceeding Tk 330 crore around the same period.

By 10 September, The Daily Star reported 18,812 submissions involving alleged bribe demands totalling Tk 551.12 crore. More than 4,000 concerned land-related services, 1,365 involved the Bangladesh Road Transport Authority, and 422 concerned taxation, involving about Tk 33.85 crore in alleged demands. About 70 percent of those submitting reports said they had paid the alleged bribe. Dhaka accounted for about 53 percent of the total reported amount.

These figures are based on anonymous submissions and represent allegations rather than independently established cases of bribery.

== Reactions ==
Following reports about Shahed Sharif Ahmed's experience, the Mymensingh Sadar Upazila Primary Education Office formed a three-member committee to investigate allegations involving officials. Two employees of the office were later issued show-cause notices.

Prothom Alo reported that the Prime Minister's Office inquired about Shahed and his initiative. The administrator of Mymensingh City Corporation also met with Shahed and discussed his initiative. Dhaka Post reported that the administrator discussed possible government support with Shahed and said his plans would be conveyed to the Prime Minister's Office.

== See also ==
- Corruption in Bangladesh
- Bribery
- Anti-corruption
