= Delbar =

Delbar may refer to:

- Divisor, a mathematical concept
- Delbar, Iran, a village in Razavi Khorasan Province, Iran
- Delbar, Kerman, a village in Kerman Province, Iran
- Delvar, a city in Iran
- Delbar Sadat, a village in Iran
- Delbar-e Rok Rok, a village in Iran

== See also ==
- Dilbar (disambiguation)
