= Murder of Delwoar Hossain =

2020 Killing in Bangladesh

- Date: May 11, 2020
- Location: Dhaka, Bangladesh
- Deaths: Delwoar Hossain
- Burial: Kazirhat, Noakhali
- Suspects: Anisur Rahman Selim; Helal Howladher Shahin; Driver Habib Mia

Delwoar Hossain was a 50-year-old Bangladeshi engineer who was murdered on May 11, 2020. His family members, coworkers, and various sources alleged Delwoar's stance against corruption was the motive behind the murder. Protesters demonstrated across the country demanding justice for Delwoar. Authorities claimed the murder happened because of a feud between coworkers which is refuted by the family of the victim. Various national organizations such as Institution of Engineers, Bangladesh (IEB) and Transparency International Bangladesh (TIB) demanded further investigation into the matter to ensure justice for the victim and his family.

Delwoar Hossain is survived by his wife and three sons.

== Education and work of Delwoar ==
Delwoar, an intransigent, devoted, hard-working person, was a student of Civil Engineering, batch 1986 of Bangladesh University of Engineering and Technology (BUET). He graduated from BUET in 1993. At the time of death, he was working as the executive engineer of Gazipur City Corporation. He was transferred to Gazipur in 2015 from Narayanganj City Corporation. Delwoar's involvement was in planning and supervising major development work of road construction. Gazipur City Corporation had an expense budget of approximately 550 million USD for the 2019-20 session. Delwoar also played a strong role in evicting local influential grabbers from the city corporation's land. Some believe that for these reasons politically influential people disliked and opposed him. Sources close to the murder investigation told the Dhaka Tribune that

"several contractors wanted to withdraw their money without completing the development work, but Delwar did not let that happen. The contractors also pressured him to increase the scheduled work bill, which Delwar did not agree to even after being offered a huge bribe."

During May-July 2019, 14 employees of Gazipur City Corporation were accused of corruption & irregularity charges and faced suspension, temporary suspension & show-cause notices. However, in September 2019, Delwoar was made an Officer on Special Duty (OSD), which allegedly happened due to the lobbying of the corrupt and influential contractors, according to news sources. Later, in February 2020, he was reassigned to the Konabari area in Gazipur.

== Persons involved in murder ==
- Delwoar Hossain, executive engineer of Gazipur City Corporation
- Anisur Rahman Selim, assistant engineer of Gazipur City Corporation
- Helal Howladher Shahin, alleged hired killer
- Habib Mia, microbus driver of Gazipur City Corporation
- Rafiqul Islam, a rickshaw-puller who was paid 100 BDT to call Delwoar on the day of murder, witness of the murder

== Incident ==
On May 11, 2020, Delwoar was supposed to go to office using the government vehicle that he used every day. But on that day, another vehicle with a new driver picked him up from his Mirpur residence. On the same day, Turag police recovered his body at 3 pm, bearing head injuries, from Diabari Beribadh area and sent it to Shaheed Suhrawardy Medical College Hospital in Dhaka's Sher-e-Bangla Nagar for autopsy. Delwoar's family members later identified his body at Shaheed Suhrawardy Medical College morgue.

Turag Police recovered the mobile of Delwoar from the lake under Bridge no-3 of Diabari and the alleged microbus used in the killing from Gualanda in Faridpur. Primary investigation by police revealed that Delwoar was suffocated to death and his body had injury marks.

Delwoar was later buried at his village home in Kazirhat, Noakhali.

== Arrest of alleged murderers ==
According to police sources, Anisur Rahman Selim, a colleague of Delwoar, was involved in the murder. Selim confessed to police that he hired killer Shahin and driver Habib to assist him in the murder. Police said they were able to identify Selim from CCTV video footages near Delwar’s Mirpur residence and that of Selim’s Kafrul residence. Police told the Daily Star that

"the footage showed that they stopped a rickshaw-puller and used his mobile phone to call someone. Moments afterwards, someone called back on the phone and the persons waiting with the microbus went in front of Delwar's residence and then abducted him."

According to police source, killer Selim sat beside Delwar in the microbus on the day of killing. The hired killer Shahin Howlader got into the microbus earlier and had seated on the rear side. Shahin strangled Delwoar hurriedly with a nylon rope when the microbus started to move. Selim also assisted Shahin to commit the murder. After ensuring the death of Delwoar, the killers dumped his body in Uttara area and left the place.

== Controversy over investigation ==
Delwoar's family told journalists that they believe some influential people to be involved in the murder incident because Selim told police and confessed to court that he killed Delwoar only because of scolding. The family of Delwoar also claimed several colleagues of Delwoar pressured him to sign files involving millions of taka with expediency. Engineer Delwoar refused to sign the files without thorough investigation. Sources at the Detective Branch (DB) of the Dhaka Metropolitan Police (DMP) said that after examining the files, the engineering branch of the city corporation had found negligence in the contracting work. The files remained stuck on the desk of Delwar Hossain. A group of contractors lobbied him several times to clear the files. One investigation agency expressed to the Daily Deshrupantor that Delwoar was murdered because he didn't sign a construction bill equivalent of 12 million USD which was 3 times the actual cost.

== Reaction ==
On 22 May 2020, the Institution of Engineers, Bangladesh (IEB) executive committee expressed their suspicion about other people’s involvement in the murder. They demanded a further investigation in the murder case saying that further investigation may identify everyone involved in the murder. On May 30, 2020 engineers all over Bangladesh wore black badges in protest against the murder. Transparency International Bangladesh (TIB) demanded fair investigation into the murder and also asked the Anti-Corruption Commission to reveal the corrupt ring involved in the killing. Current students, alumni of BUET and BUET Alumni Association also demanded justice for Delwoar's murder. Councilor M Selim Rahman and Mayor Jahangir Alam told a news media Channel i that the motive behind this murder could be the bribe money from City Corporation contractors. All officers and employees of Gopalganj LGED staged a demonstration on June 2, 2020 and demanded speedy trial and further investigation of the murder. Family members of Delwoar together with hundreds of engineers from Bangladesh and honourable teachers from BUET, formed a human chain on July 18, 2020 and demanded arrest of masterminds behind the murder with an in-depth investigation. The family members claimed that anonymous people along with some officials of Gazipur City Corporation, asked them over the phone not to demand further investigation of the murder.

== See also ==
- Corruption in Bangladesh
