= Taxation in Bangladesh =

Bangladesh tax codes

In Bangladesh, the principal taxes are customs duties, value added tax (VAT), supplementary duty, income tax and corporation tax. The tax revenue of Bangladesh is 7.6% as of 2021.

== Income tax ==
The history of income tax in Bangladesh dates back to 1860 when it was introduced by the British Raj under the title Income Tax Act. Since then various changes have taken place.

FY 2025-2026
Rate	Tax bracket
0%	Up to ৳3,75,000
10%	৳3,75,000 to ৳6,75,000
15%	৳6,75,000 to ৳10,75,000
20%	৳10,75,000 to ৳15,75,000
25%	৳15,75,000 to ৳35,75,000
30%	Above ৳35,75,000

== Value added tax ==
Value added tax (VAT) in Bangladesh was introduced in 1991. The standard rate of VAT is 15% levied on transaction value of most of the imports and supplies of goods and services.

== Corporate tax rate ==
The tax law imposes income tax at 25 percent on listed entities and 32.5 percent for non-listed entities. Corporate tax rate changes announced this year include:

- an additional surcharge of 2.5 percent on income of companies in the tobacco sector
- a reduction of the corporate income tax rate for companies in the readymade garments sector to 15 percent (from 20 percent)
- a further 1 percent rate reduction (to 14 percent) for companies in the readymade garments sector that have an internationally recognized green building certificate.

Certain companies remain taxed at different rates. For example:

- Banking companies, insurance companies and non-banking financial institutions are taxed at 40 percent if they are listed and 42.5 percent if non-listed.
- Cigarette manufacturers and mobile phone operator are taxed at 45 percent (before the additional surcharge on cigarette manufacturers noted above)
- Companies engaged in production and export of knitwear and woven garments enjoy a reduced corporate tax rates of 20 percent, and companies that produce or export jute products are taxed at 10 percent.

Generally, a company's export earnings are 50 percent exempt.

For companies, the tax day (i.e. tax return due date) is now the 15th day of seventh month following the end of income year; alternatively, where that fifteenth day is before 15 September, the tax day is 15 September of the year following the end of the income year.

== Tax holidays ==
Finance Bill 2017 makes no changes to the current tax legislation providing tax holidays for:

- industries established in export processing zones (5 to 7 years, depending on location)
- investment in economic zones (10 years) and development of economic zones (12 years)
- industrial undertakings (5 to 10 years, depending on location)
- physical infrastructure (10 years)
- coal-based private power generation companies (15 years)
- non-coal-based power generation companies (10 years).

The tax holiday (until 2024) for companies engaged in "information technology enabled services" also remains intact, although Finance Bill 2017 includes specifically defines these services.

== National Board of Revenue ==
The National Board of Revenue (NBR) is the central authority for tax administration in Bangladesh. Administratively, it is the attached department to the Internal Resources Division (IRD) of the Ministry of Finance (MoF). MoF has four divisions, namely, the Finance Division the Internal Resources Division (IRD), the Banking Division and the Economic Relations Division (ERD). Each division is headed by a Secretary to the Government. Secretary, IRD is the ex-officio Chairman of NBR. NBR is responsible for the formulation and continuous re-appraisal of tax-policies and tax-laws in Bangladesh.

Negotiating tax treaties with foreign governments and participating in inter-ministerial deliberations on economic issues having a bearing on fiscal policies and tax administration are also NBR's responsibilities. The main responsibility of NBR is to mobilize domestic resources through the collection of import duties and taxes, VAT and income tax for the government. Side by side with collection of taxes, facilitation of international trade through quick clearance of import and export cargoes has also emerged as a key role of NBR. Other responsibilities include administration of matters related to taxes, duties and other revenue related fees/charges and prevention of smuggling. Under the overall control of IRD, NBR administers the excise, VAT, customs and income-tax services consisting of 3434 officers of various grades and 10195 supporting staff positions.
