= Janata Tower Case =

The Janata Tower Case was a corruption case in Bangladesh over Janata Tower in Kawran Bazar in Dhaka. The case lead to the conviction of former military dictator General Hussain Ershad.

== Background ==
Janata Tower is an 11 storey building located in Kawran Bazar, Dhaka, Bangladesh. It was originally planned to be 15 floors. After construction stopped in 1991 when Ershad stepped down, the tower became a home for squatters.

== History ==
On 14 April 1991, the Bureau of Anti Corruption (today Anti Corruption Commission) filed a case against 17 people, including former president and military autocrat Ershad and 19 others with Tejgaon Police Station. He was charged with abuse of power for collusion with M. M. Rahmat Ullah in allotting the land for the project, and possessing unaccounted money. The Chief Justice of Bangladesh, in his 91 page verdict, said Ershad was found guilty under the Prevention Act. On 20 November 2000, the Chief Justice sentenced the former president to seven years' imprisonment. The building was acquired by the Bangladesh government. As a result, Ershad could not participate in the 2001 Bangladeshi general election.

Ershad appealed the verdict in the High Court Division which affirmed the conviction, but reduced the sentence to five years on 24 August 2004. He was also fined 55 million taka. He was released with a year and half remaining on his sentence. Ershad's then wife Rowshan Ershad was fined ten thousand taka. Shukur Ali Pradhan, another accused in the case, had filed to get the tower back from the government. The High Court ruled in his favor but the Supreme Court overturned it and the property remains in government ownership.

Ershad, the former President of Bangladesh and chief of the National Party (Jatiya Party), was released on bail on 9 April 2001 after serving four months in jail in Dhaka.

== Legacy ==
The tower was repurposed as a software park by the Bangladesh government. Matiur Rahman Chowdhury, editor of the daily Manab Zamin was sentenced to jail in May 2002 for contempt of court. The newspaper had published a transcript of a telephone conversation between Ershad and a High Court judge in which Ershad was seeking a more favourable verdict in the Janata Tower case.

== Bibliography ==
- Report (2001). Country report: Bangladesh. Economist Intelligence Unit. p. 15.
- Thomas, K. K. (1993). Asian recorder, Volume 39, Issue 1. Recorder Press. p. 23248.
