= Faisal Mahmud Faizee =

Bangladeshi judge

Justice of the High Court Division of Bangladesh

Personal details
- Profession: Judge

Faisal Mahmud Faizee is a former judge of the High Court Division of the Bangladesh Supreme Court. He resigned from the court over allegations of having improperly received his law degree.

== Career ==
On 31 October 2004, Faizee was withdrawn from the High Court Division by Chief Justice Syed JR Mudassir Husain after newspaper reports emerged questioning his law degree. His father sued Bhorer Kagoj and Prothom Alo on contempt of court charges and won.

On 24 April 2005, the Bangladesh Bar Council cancelled the enrolment certificate of Faizee due to his recorded birth date not matching the birth date on his birth certificate. The decision was taken following a meeting of the council led by Barrister Rokanuddin Mahmud. The council also condemned the inclusion of Faizee in the High Court Division bench despite the controversy over his degree. In December 2005, the Bangladesh Supreme Court Bar Association called for Faizees removal due to disputes over his degree and receiving a reception from Bangladesh Nationalist Party and Bangladesh Jamaat-e-Islami activists in Chittagong.

On 15 December 2006, Faizee sentenced former president of Bangladesh, Hussain Mohammad Ershad to two years imprisonment in a corruption case related to the purchase of 520 boats from Japan for relief operations after the 1989 Bangladesh floods.

In 2007, the Supreme Judicial Council was created to investigate the charges against Faizee. The University of Chittagong had cancelled his law degree and those of a few others after it found evidence of tampering with grade sheets in March. He resigned on 12 July 2007, before the conclusion of the investigation.

Faizee is a member of the executive committee of the Bangladesh Nationalist Party.
