= Padma Bridge graft scandal =

Political scandal in Bangladesh

The Padma Bridge graft scandal was a political scandal in Bangladesh during 2016 and 2017, involving allegations of bribery linked to the construction of the Padma Bridge, the country's longest road-rail bridge spanning 6.15-kilometer (3.82 mi) across the Padma River.

The scandal implicated officials associated with the Bangladesh Awami League government and raised concerns about transparency in the project's funding and contracting process.

The World Bank, which had committed ৳11,367 crore (US$1.2 billion) in credit for the project, withdrew its funding, citing evidence of corruption.

The allegations centered on the claim that the Canadian construction firm SNC-Lavalin had offered bribes to Bangladeshi officials in exchange for securing a contract. Two SNC-Lavalin executives were charged in Canada in connection with the alleged bribery scheme. However, after the court ruled to exclude key wiretap evidence, the prosecution withdrew the charges, and the case was subsequently dismissed.

== World Bank personal statement ==
The World Bank has published a detailed statement about its allegation of corruption relating to the Padma Bridge and its subsequent pullout from the financing of the project. It also published an FAQ ("Frequently Asked Questions") document in order to better explain its position and activities.

The World Bank alleged that a "conspiracy" had been plotted to stage high-level corruption in the project:

The World Bank has credible evidence corroborated by a variety of sources which points to a high-level corruption conspiracy among Bangladeshi government officials, SNC Lavalin executives, and private individuals in connection with the Padma Multipurpose Bridge Project.

They have provided the Bangladeshi government with evidence of the corruption plot and stated that they could not move forward with the loan if no action was taken:

To be willing to go forward with the alternative turnkey-style approach, they sought the following actions: (i) place all public officials suspected of involvement in the corruption scheme on leave from Government employment until the investigation is completed; (ii) appoint a special inquiry team within the ACC to handle the investigation, and (iii) agree to provide full and adequate access to all investigative information to a panel appointed by the World Bank composed of internationally recognized experts so that the panel can give guidance to the lenders on the progress, adequacy, and fairness of the investigation. We worked extensively with the Government and the ACC to ensure that all actions requested were fully aligned with Bangladeshi laws and procedures.

They also said that they had sent a delegation to the Government of Bangladesh to seek an explanation from them, but the explanation from the Bangladeshi side was unsatisfactory:

... we sent a high-level team to Dhaka to fully explain the Bank’s position and receive the Government’s response. The response has been unsatisfactory at the time.

== Investigation ==
=== Canadian court ===
SNC-Lavalin official Ramesh Saha's diary had a list of Bangladeshi citizens who were to receive 10–12% commission for awarding the Padma Bridge contract to SNC-Lavalin. According to her diary: "Padma PCC, 4% Min, 2% Kaiser, 2% Nixon, 1% Secretary and 1% Moshi Rahman." According to the documents, "Min" referred to former communication minister Syed Abul Hossain; "Kaiser" is former state minister for foreign affairs Abul Hasan Chowdhury; "Nixon" is the prime minister's nephew Mujibur Rahman; "Secretary" is former Bridges Division secretary Mosharraf Hossain Bhuiyan; and "Moshi Rahman" is the prime minister's economic affairs adviser Mashiur Rahman. Another 2% was kept for someone, but the name was not available.

=== CBC TV ===
CBC TV of Canada performed investigative journalism, and they speculated that there was a wide-ranged plot of corruption in the project.

== Aftermath ==
The World Bank blacklisted the Canadian firm, SNC-Lavalin Inc, and banned it from any business for 10 years due to the firm's alleged involvement in Padma Bridge project corruption scandal. Since the World Bank withdrew its involvement, the estimated cost of the bridge has climbed by over US$3 billion and the expected completion date is being pushed back by four years to 2022. The bridge has been completed and inaugurated in 2022 in Bangladesh with its own resources. On 24 January 2017, in her speech in the parliament, Prime Minister Sheikh Hasina blamed Muhammad Yunus for the World Bank pulling out of the project. According to her, Yunus lobbied with the former US Secretary of State Hillary Clinton to persuade the World Bank to terminate the loan.

== Dismissal of charges by a Canadian court and Bangladesh ACC ==
In 2015, Bangladesh's Anti-Corruption Commission (ACC) investigated the case after the World Bank continuously pushed the government to take action against the alleged perpetrators. After 53 days of investigation, ACC found nobody to be guilty. On the basis of ACC's report, Dhaka district judge court acquitted all the seven government officials who were alleged to have been involved in the corruption plot. Before that, the ACC exonerated Syed Abul Hossain and ex-state minister for foreign affairs Abul Hasan Chowdhury from the allegation of involvement in the corruption conspiracy.

On 11 February 2017, a Canadian court acquitted ex-SNC-Lavalin executives, dismissing the case. The wire tap evidence was ruled inadmissible.
