= List of people from Greater Faridpur =

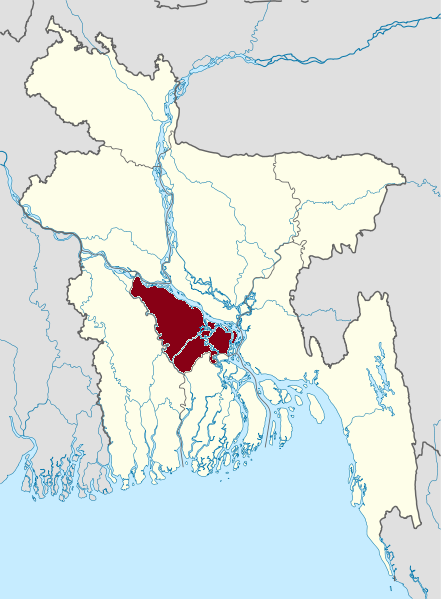
Map of Greater Faridpur within Bangladesh

This is a list of notable residents and people who have origins in the proposed Faridpur Division region of Bangladesh; consisting of the districts of Faridpur, Rajbari, Madaripur, Gopalgonj and Shariatpur. This list also includes British Bangladeshis, Bangladeshi Americans, Bangladeshi Canadians, and other non-resident Bengalis who have origins in Greater Faridpur. The people may also be known as Faridpuri.

== Activism and cause célèbres ==
- Abala Bose, social worker
- Chittapriya Ray Chaudhuri, revolutionary
- Chittaranjan Das, freedom fighter, political activist and lawyer
- Durga Mohan Das, social reformer for women rights
- Dwarkanath Ganguly, women's rights social reformer
- Jyotirmayee Gangopadhyay, feminist and educationist
- Harichand Thakur, social worker for untouchable castes
- Manoranjan Bhattacharya, Indian independence activist
- Panchanan Chakraborty, Indian independence activist
- Pulin Behari Das, revolutionary and founder of the Dhaka Anushilan Samiti
- Sayera Khatun, housewife and mother of Sheikh Mujibur Rahman
- Siraj Sikder, revolutionary
- Sheikh Fazilatunnesa Mujib, wife of Sheikh Mujibur Rahman
- Sheikh Russel, son of Sheikh Mujibur Rahman
- Ruby Ghaznavi, handicraft revivalist

== Art and design ==
- Bijan Choudhury, painter
- Faruque Alam, civil engineer, wood technologist and former chairman of Bangladesh Inland Water Transport Corporation
- Fazlur Rahman Khan, architect that is dubbed the Einstein of Structural Engineering
- Himanish Goswami, cartoonist
- Jogen Chowdhury, painter
- Kalidas Karmakar, artist and specialist of viscosity printing
- Kazi Anowar Hossain, painter
- Monsur Ul Karim, painter
- Sarbari Roy Choudhury, artist
- Shamim Sikder, sculptor

== Business and industry ==
- Chowdhury Moyezuddin Biwshash, zamindar and merchant
- Fakhruddin Ahmed, former governor of the Bangladesh Bank
- Kazi Zafarullah, industrialist and politician
- Khuda Buksh, life insurance salesman and humanitarian
- Parveen Haque Sikder, director of National Bank Limited
- Wahiduzzaman, director of the State Bank of Pakistan and founder of Zaman Industrial Corporation

== Education and sciences ==
- Abdullah Baqui, public health scientist
- Amalendu De, professor of history at Jadavpur University
- Farzana Islam, vice-chancellor of Jahangirnagar University
- Gopal Chandra Bhattacharya, entomologist and naturalist
- Jagadish Chandra Bose, inventor of the crescograph and father of radio science and Bengali science fiction. A Moon crater is named after him.
- Kadambini Ganguly, first Indian female practitioner of western medicine
- Kamrun Nesa Nilu, physician and health advisor to the Government of Bangladesh
- Kazi Shahidullah, former vice-chancellor at the National University, Bangladesh
- Maqsudul Alam, life scientist best known for genome sequencing
- Mokarram Hussain Khundker, professor of chemistry at Dhaka University and a founder of the Bangladesh Academy of Sciences
- Nawab Abdul Latif, educator and social worker
- Prasanta Chandra Mahalanobis, anthropometrist, statistician and introducer of the Mahalanobis distance
- Qazi Abu Yusuf, physician and politician
- Qazi Motahar Hossain, scientist, author and teacher
- R. C. Majumdar, history professor and former Sheriff of Kolkata
- Sarala Roy, educationist
- Shariff Enamul Kabir, former vice-chancellor of Jahangirnagar University
- Sufia Ahmed, first female National Professor
- Zohra Begum Kazi, first female physician of Bengal

== Entertainment ==
- Bijon Bhattacharya, theatre and film actor
- Kazi Abdul Wadud, dramatist
- Mohammad Asaduzzaman, chairman of the University Grants Commission
- Mrinal Sen, filmmaker
- Nargis Akhter, film director, screenwriter and producer
- Nurul Momen, pioneer of Bengali drama
- Phani Majumdar, Indian film director
- Premankur Atorthy, filmmaker, novelist and journalist
- Riaz, Bangladeshi film actor
- Rubaiyat Hossain, film director
- Shakib Khan, Dhallywood film actor
- Tareque Masud, film director, producer and screenwriter

=== Music ===
- Firoza Begum, Nazrul Geeti singer
- Fakir Alamgir, folk and pop singer
- Geeta Dutt, singer
- Sagar Sen, Rabindra Sangeet singer

== Families ==
- Nawabs of Padamdi, descended from Syed Shah Pahlwan
- Sheikhs of Tungipara, descended from Sheikh Awwal of Baghdad
- Zamindars of Haturia, descended from Shaykh Muhammad Ashuq Mridha
- Biswas Family of Faridpur, descended from Arafat Ali of Jaunpur

== Legal and police ==
- A. B. M. Khairul Haque, 19th Chief Justice of Bangladesh
- A. K. M. Shahidul Haque, 27th Inspector General of Bangladesh Police
- Asmat Ali Khan, advocate and social worker
- Golam Wahed Choudhury, political scientist and diplomat
- Habibur Rahman, Deputy Inspector General of Bangladesh Police
- KM Sobhan, justice, diplomat and activist
- M. Azizul Haq, former inspector-general of Bangladesh Police
- Mosharraf Hossain, lawyer and politician
- Muhammad Ibrahim, judge and 8th vice-chancellor of Dhaka University
- Noor-E-Alam Chowdhury Liton, chief whip of Jatiya Sangsad
- Satish Ranjan Das, lawyer and former Advocate-General of Bengal
- Sheikh Lutfar Rahman, civil court record-keeping officer
- Sigma Huda, human rights activist, lawyer and United Nations special rapporteur
- Sudhi Ranjan Das, fifth Chief Justice of India

== Literature and journalism ==
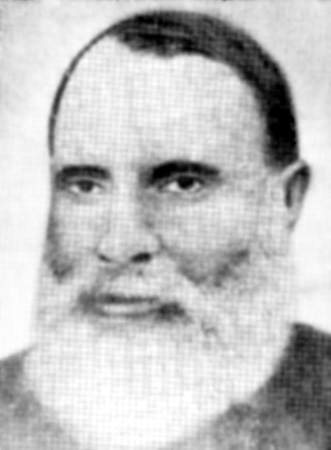
Mir Mosharraf Hossain was one of the first major Muslim writers of modern Bengal and is best known for magnum opus, Bishad Shindhu, a popular classic among Bengali readership.

- Abu Ishaque, novelist
- Abul Hasan, poet and journalist
- Ajit Kumar Chakravarty, litterateur and translator
- Alaol, medieval Bengali poet
- ANM Bazlur Rashid, litterateur and educationist
- Atul Prasad Sen, educationist, lyricist and litterateur
- Gautam Das, print journalist and bureau chief for Samakal
- Habibullah Siraji, poet
- Humayun Kabir, educationist, politician and philosopher.
- Jasimuddin, poet and folklorist
- Mir Mosharraf Hossain, novelist, playwright and essayist
- Mohammad A. Quayum, editor, critic and translator
- Narendranath Mitra, short-story writer
- Nassakh, Urdu poet, literary critic and magistrate
- Ram Thakur, Hindu journalist
- Rowshan Ali Chowdhury, journalist, writer, poet and politician
- Sufi Motahar Hossein, poet
- Sukanta Bhattacharya, poet and playwright
- Sunil Gangopadhyay, poet and novelist
- Yakub Ali Chowdhury, essayist and journalist

== Military ==
- Abu Mayeen Ashfakus Samad, former Bangladesh Army officer
- ATM Amin, former general of the Bangladesh Army
- Mohabbat Jan Chowdhury, former major general of the Bangladesh Army
- Atiqur Rahman, Bangladesh's 4th Chief of Army Staff
- Khondkar Nazmul Huda, war veteran
- Mohammad Nizamuddin Ahmed, former Chief of Bangladeshi Naval Staff
- Munshi Abdur Rouf, military officer
- Mustafizur Rahman, Bangladesh's 8th Chief of Army Staff
- Shafiqur Rahman, former Chief of General Staff (Bangladesh Army)
- Sheikh Fazlul Haque Mani, founder of the Mujib Bahini and the Jubo League
- Sheikh Jamal, former lieutenant of the Bangladesh Army
- Suranjan Das, Indian pilot

== Politics and government ==
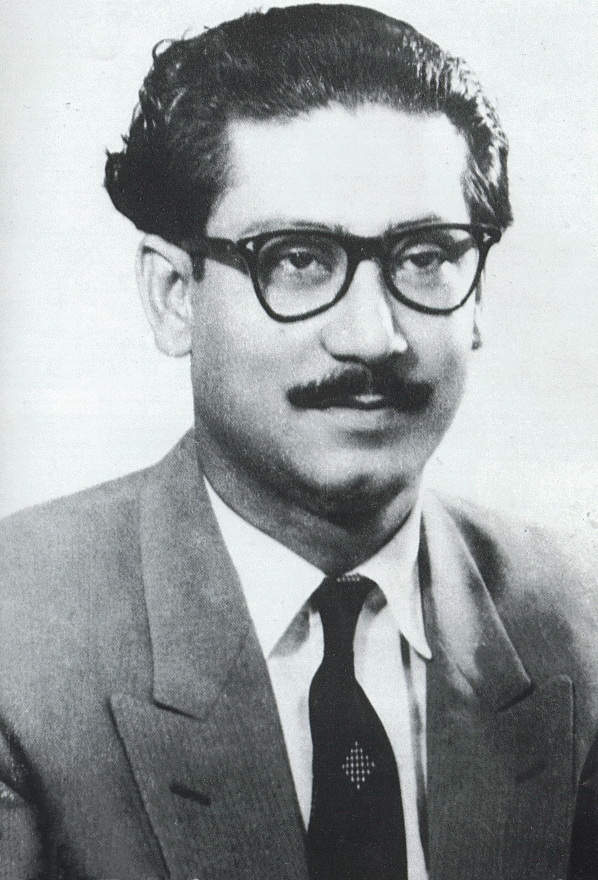
Sheikh Mujibur Rahman is credited as an important figure in efforts to gain political autonomy for East Pakistan.

=== Bangladesh ===
- Abdul Quader Mollah, Jamaat-e-Islami politician
- Abdul Wajed Chowdhury, politician
- Abdur Rab Serniabat, former Minister of Water Resources
- Abdur Razzaq, former Minister of Water Resources
- Abdus Sobhan Golap, MP for Madaripur-3
- Abidur Reza Khan, former MP for Faridpur-18
- Abul Hasanat Abdullah, MP for Barisal-1
- Abul Kalam Azad, Jamaat-e-Islami politician
- Abul Khair Chowdhury, former MP of Madaripur-1
- AFM Bahauddin Nasim, former MP for Madaripur-3
- Akhteruzzaman Babul, politician for Jatiya Party (Ershad)
- Akkas Ali Miah, former MP for Rajbari-1
- AKM Aszad, politician
- AKM Enamul Haque Shamim, MP for Shariatpur-2 and Deputy Minister of Water Resources
- Ali Ahsan Mohammad Mojaheed, former secretary-general of Bangladesh Jamaat-e-Islami
- Ali Newaz Mahmud Khaiyam, former MP
- B. M. Muzammel Haque, former MP for Shariatpur-1
- Chowdhury Akmal Ibne Yusuf, former Bangladesh Nationalist Party politician
- Chowdhury Kamal Ibne Yusuf, former Minister of Food
- Farid Ahmed, former independent MP of Gopalganj-2
- Faruk Khan, former Minister of Civil Aviation and Tourism
- Ganesh Chandra Haldar, former MP for Madaripur-3
- Helen Zerin Khan, member of the Jatiya Sangsad Reserved Seats
- Iqbal Hossain Apu, MP for Shariatpur-2
- Ilias Ahmed Chowdhury, former MP of Madaripur-1
- Jahanara Begum, politician
- Kazi Abdur Rashid, former MP of Gopalganj-1
- Kazi Keramat Ali, former Minister for Technical and Madrasa Education
- Khandaker Mosharraf Hossain, former Minister of Local Government, Rural Development and Co-operatives
- K. M. Hemayet Ullah Auranga, former MP for Shariatpur-1
- KM Obaidur Rahman, former politician for Awami League
- Lutfar Rahman Farooq, politician
- Master Majibur Rahman, former MP for Shariatpur-1
- Md. Zillul Hakim, former MP for Rajbari-2
- M. H. Khan Monjur, former MP of Gopalganj-1
- Mujibur Rahman Chowdhury, MP for Faridpur-4
- Naheed Ezaher Khan, member of the Jatiya Sangsad Reserved Seats
- Nahim Razzaq, MP for Shariatpur-3
- Nasirul Haque Sabu, former MP for Rajbari-2
- Nilufer Zafarullah, member of the Jatiya Sangsad Reserved Seats
- Phani Bhushan Majumder, former Minister of Information
- Qazi Mahabub Ahmed, former MP for Madaripur-2
- Rushema Begum, member of the Jatiya Sangsad Reserved Seats
- Salma Chowdhury, MP
- Sardar AKM Nasiruddin, former MP for Shariatpur-1
- Sarwar Jan Miah, former MNA politician
- Sarwar Jan Chowdhury, former MP of Gopalganj-1
- Serniabat Sadiq Abdullah, the Mayor of Barisal
- Shajahan Khan, former Bangladeshi Minister of Shipping
- Sharfuzzaman Jahangir, former MP of Gopalganj-1
- Shawkat Ali, deputy speaker of the Jatiya Sangsad
- Sheikh Abu Naser, former MP
- Sheikh Fazle Noor Taposh, 2nd Mayor of South Dhaka
- Sheikh Hasina, 10th Prime Minister of Bangladesh
- Sheikh Helal Uddin, Awami League politician
- Sheikh Md Abdullah, former Minister of Religious Affairs
- Sheikh Mujibur Rahman, first President of Bangladesh
- Sheikh Rehana, politician
- Sheikh Salahuddin Jewel, MP for Khulna-2
- Sheikh Selim, member of the Awami League standing committee
- Sheikh Shahidul Islam, secretary general of the Jatiya Party (Manju)
- Sheikh Tonmoy, MP for Bagerhat-2
- Sirajul Islam Bhuiyan, former MP for Madaripur-2
- Syed Abul Hossain, Awami League politician
- Syed Qumrul Islam Saleh Uddin, (1937–1983), former MNA and Constituent Assembly Member, founder - Bangladesh Justice Party
- Syeda Sajeda Chowdhury, deputy leader of the Jatiya Sangsad
- T. M. Giasuddin Ahmed, former MP for Shariatpur-2

=== Other ===
- Ambica Charan Mazumdar, former president of the Indian National Congress
- Buddhadeb Bhattacharjee, former Chief Minister of West Bengal
- Chowdhury Abd-Allah Zaheeruddin, former Minister of Health, Labour and Social Welfare for Pakistan
- Farida Anwar, Labour Party politician in the United Kingdom
- Fayakuzzaman, member of the 3rd National Assembly of Pakistan
- Kedar Ray, 16th-century Baro-Bhuiyan chieftain and zamindar
- Maulvi Tamizuddin Khan, former Speaker of the Constituent Assembly of Pakistan
- Sudha Roy, Indian communist trade unionist
- Yusuf Ali Chowdhury, Muslim League politician

== Religion and spirituality ==
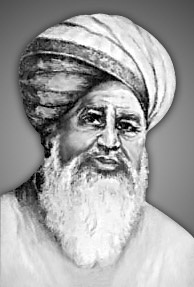
Haji Shariatullah was a prominent 19th-century Muslim leader of the subcontinent.

- Abdul Haque Faridi, educator and author
- Dudu Miyan, 2nd leader of the Faraizi Movement
- Haji Shariatullah, anti-British revolutionary, founder of the Faraizi Movement
- Shamsul Haque Faridpuri, educationist and social reformer

== Sports ==
- Aminul Islam, all-rounder cricketer
- Gostha Pal, footballer and first captain of the India national team
- Mabia Akhter, weightlifter
- Sheikh Kamal, founder of Abahani and aide-de-camp of Mukti Bahini
- Shohely Akhter, cricketer
