= Mujib (name) =

Mujib (Arabic: مجيب, romanized: Mujīb) is an Arabic word meaning "Respondent" or "Answerer" based on the triconsonantal root J-W-B. It is used to form various Islamic theophoric names, and sometimes used as a contraction of them. As a given name, "Mujib" and its derivatives are far more popular in the Indian subcontinent, especially Bangladesh, than in Arabic-speaking countries.

In Islam, Al-Mujib (Arabic: المجيب, romanized: al-Mujīb) is one of the Names of God.

== People with names containing Mujib ==
- Abdul Mujib (Arabic: عبد المجيب, lit. 'Servant of al-Mujib')
  - Abdul Mujib
  - Abdul Mujib Imron
- Mujibul Haqq (Arabic: مجيب الحق, lit. 'Respondent of al-Haqq')
  - Mujibul Haque
  - Majibul Haque Chowdhury
  - Mujibul Haque Mujib
  - Mujibul Haque (officer)
  - Mujibul Huq
- Mujibul Husayn (Arabic: مجيب الحسين, lit. 'Respondent of al-Husayn')
- Mujibullah (Arabic: مجيب الله, lit. 'Respondent of Allah')
  - Mujibulla Khan
- Mujibur Rahman (Arabic: مجيب الرحمن, lit. 'Respondent of ar-Rahman')
  - A. F. Mujibur Rahman
  - A. K. Mujibur Rahman
  - Majibur Rahman Sarwar
  - Mohammad Mujibur Rahman
  - Mojibur Rahman
  - Mojibur Rahman Jony
  - Mojibur Rahman (officer)
  - Mojibur Rahman (politician)
  - Mujeeb Ur Rahman
  - Mujeeb-ur-Rehman Shami
  - Mujeeb-ur-Rehman Omar
  - Mujibur Rahman and Sirajul Islam
  - Mujibur Rahman (academic)
  - Mujib-ur-Rahman Ansari
  - Mujibur Rahman (army officer)
  - Mujibur Rahman (Bangladeshi politician)
  - Mujibur Rahman (BNP politician)
  - Mujibur Rahman Chowdhury
  - Mujibur Rahman (Comilla politician)
  - Mujibur Rahman Devdas
  - Mujibur Rahman Dilu
  - Mujibur Rahman Dulu
  - Mujibur Rahman Fakir
  - Mujibur Rahman Howlader
  - Mujibur Rahman Khan
  - Mujibur Rahman Khan (politician)
  - Mujibur Rahman Monju
  - Mujibur Rahman (scientist)
  - Mujibur Rahman (Sri Lankan politician)
  - Mujibur Rahman Talukder
  - Sheikh Mujibur Rahman
  - Sheikh Mujibur Rahman (politician)
  - S. M. Mujibur Rahman
