= Mujibur Rahman (disambiguation) =

Sheikh Mujibur Rahman (1920–1975) was a politician and statesman who became the first President of Bangladesh.

Mujibur Rahman or Mojibur Rahman may also refer to:

- Mujibur Rahman (scientist) (1919–2015), Bangladeshi medical academic
- Mojibur Rahman (politician, born 1941) (1941–2016), Bangladeshi politician from Lalmonirhat
- Mojibur Rahman (cricketer) (born 1995), Bangladeshi cricketer
- Mujibur Rahman (general) (born 1968), former lieutenant general of the Bangladesh Army
- Mujibur Rahman (Sri Lankan politician) (born 1968), Sri Lankan politician
- Mujibur Rahman (Rajshahi politician) (fl. 1980s), Bangladeshi politician from and former member of parliament from Rajshahi-1
- Mujibur Rahman (Dinajpur politician) (fl. 1990s), Bangladeshi politician from Dinajpur District
- Sheikh Mujibur Rahman (Bagerhat politician) (fl. 1990s–2000s), Bangladeshi politician from Bagerhat District
- Mujibur Rahman of Mujibur and Sirajul (fl. 1990s–2000s), guests on The Late Show with David Letterman
- Mujeeb Ur Rahman (born 2001), Afghan cricketer
- Mujibur Rahman (Ranjpur politician)
- Mujibur Rahman (commodore)
- Mujibur Rahman (officer, born 1953)
- Mojibur Rahman (Kishoreganj politician)
- Master Majibur Rahman, Bangladeshi politician and former member of parliament from Shariatpur-1

== People with the given names ==
- Mohammad Mujibur Rahman, Bangladeshi politician
- Mujibur Rahman Ansari, Afghan religious cleric
- Mujibur Rahman Chowdhury (born 1978), Bangladeshi politician from Faridpur
- Mujibur Rahman Devdas (born 1930), Bangladeshi activist
- Mujibur Rahman Dilu (born 1951), Bangladeshi actor and director
- Mujibur Rahman Dulu, Bangladeshi film editor
- Mozibur Rahman Fakir (1947–2016), Bangladeshi politician from Mymensingh
- Mujibur Rahman Khan (1910–1984), Bangladeshi journalist
- Mujibur Rahman Khan (politician) (1873–1940) journalist and Indian nationalist activist
- Mujibur Rahman Monju (1947–2015), Bangladeshi politician from Kishoreganj
- Mojibur Rahman Jony, Bangladeshi footballer
- Sheikh Mujibur Rahman (born 1953), Indian politician from West Bengal

== See also ==
- Bangabandhu (disambiguation)
- Mujib: The Making of a Nation, a 2023 Indian-Bangladeshi film about Sheikh Mujibur Rahman by Shyam Benegal
