= Qazi Abu Yusuf =

Bangladeshi politician

Doctor Qazi Abu Yusuf

Faridpur-6 constituency Member of Parliament
- In office 1979–1982
- Preceded by: Imam Uddin Ahmad
- Succeeded by: Lutfar Rahman Farooq

Faridpur-5 constituency Member of Parliament
- In office 27 February 1991 – 15 February 1996
- Preceded by: Akhteruzzaman Babul
- Succeeded by: Sarwar Jahan Mia
- In office 12 June 1996 – 1 October 2001
- Preceded by: Sarwar Jahan Mia
- Succeeded by: Kazi Zafarullah

Personal details
- Party: Awami League
- Relations: Kazi Zafarullah (nephew); Nilufer Zafarullah (nephew's wife)

Qazi Abu Yusuf is a Bangladeshi politician and physician of Faridpur District, who was a member of parliament for the then Faridpur-6 and Faridpur-5 constituencies.

== Early life ==
Abu Yusuf was born in Bhanga Upazila, Faridpur District. His nephew is Kazi Zafarullah, a former MP from Faridpur-5 constituency who is a member of the Awami League.

== Career ==
Abu Yusuf is a physician. He was elected a member of parliament from the then Faridpur-6 constituency as an independent candidate in the second parliamentary elections of 1989. He later joined the Awami League and was elected a member of parliament from the then Faridpur-5 constituency as a candidate of the Awami League in the 5th Parliamentary Elections of 1991 and the 7th Parliamentary Elections of 12 June 1996.
