= Md. Selimuzzaman Mollah =

Bangladeshi politician

- মোঃ সেলিমুজ্জামান মোল্লা

Member of Parliament
- Incumbent
- Assumed office 17 February 2026
- Preceded by: Faruk Khan
- Constituency: Gopalganj-1

Personal details
- Born: 1970 (age 55–56)
- Party: Bangladesh Nationalist Party
- Spouse: Sabrina Binte Ahmed
- Education: Dhaka Residential Model College
- Occupation: Politician

Md. Selimuzzaman Mollah (also known as Selimuzzaman Selim) is a Bangladeshi politician who, in February 2026, became the member of parliament for Gopalganj-1. He is a member of the Bangladesh Nationalist Party (BNP), having gotten his start in politics with their student and youth wings, the Jatiyatabadi Chhatra Dal (JCD) and the Bangladesh Jatiotabadi Jubodal. He has been an assistant organising secretary of the BNP executive committee since 2016.

== Biography ==
=== Early life and education ===
Md. Selimuzzaman Mollah was born in 1970. His father, Moazzem Hossain, was a government official. His mother was Fatema Begum. He grew up in Maheshpur Union of Kashiani Upazila, Gopalganj District. There he studied at Joynagar Government Primary School. He earned his Secondary School Certificate (SSC) at Joynagar Secondary School. He earned his Higher Secondary Certificate (HSC) at Dhaka Residential Model College. Then he enrolled at the University of Dhaka.

=== Student and youth wings ===
There he became involved with the JCD, the student wing of the Bangladesh Nationalist Party (BNP). He held various posts in the University of Dhaka unit of JCD and then in its central organisation. He also became a leader in the Bangladesh Jatiotabadi Jubodal, the youth wing of the BNP.

=== Bangladesh Nationalist Party ===
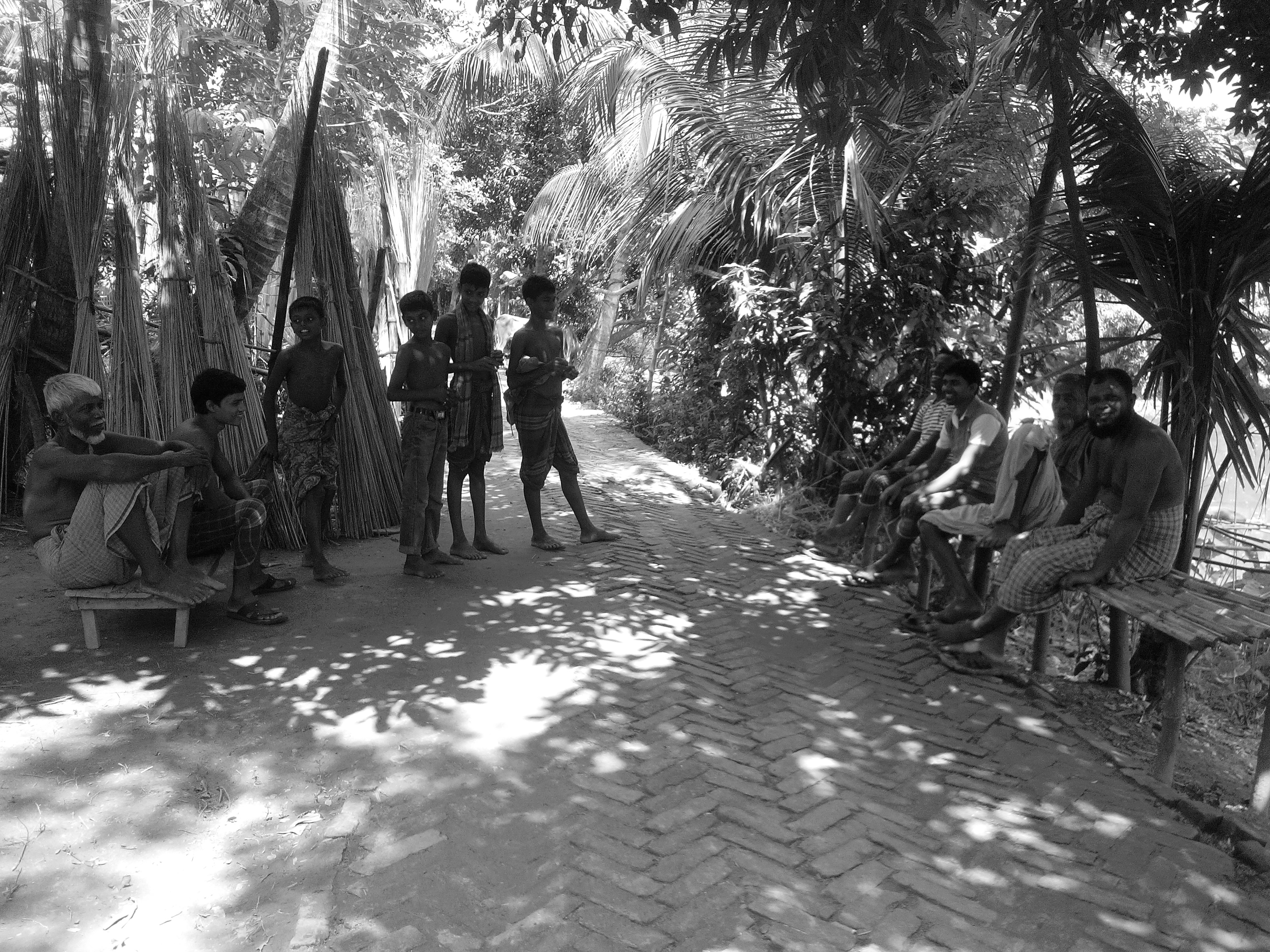
Villagers conversing in Gopalpur, Muksudpur Upazila, part of the Gopalganj-1 constituency

The 2008 general election gave the 38-year-old Mollah a chance to stand for parliament. The BNP selected him as their candidate for Gopalganj-1. It was not a promising seat, being an Awami League bastion. He ran against the incumbent, Faruk Khan, and was heavily defeated, with a tiny proportion of the vote. Afterward he stayed active in local politics.

In 2016, Mollah became an assistant organising secretary on the BNP executive committee.

Mollah, who had developed strong local contacts in Gopalganj-1, was a contender for the BNP's nomination in the 2018 general election. However, the nomination instead went to F. E. Sharfuzzaman Jahangir, who had unsuccessfully contested Gopalganj-2 for the BNP in 1991 and June 1996.

In 2024, the July Uprising ousted the Awami League government. With parliament dissolved and no date set for new elections, it was uncertain who the BNP would nominate next. Like Mollha, Syed Joynul Abedin Mesbah had been a contender for the 2018 nomination. On 10 January 2025, his supporters clashed violently with supporters of Mollah in Muksudpur Upazila, leaving 25 people injured and 30 shops vandalized.

The interim government of Muhammad Yunus banned the Awami League in May 2025. Faruk Khan, who had been elected six consecutive times since 1996, was imprisoned.

Mollah's longstanding efforts in Gopalganj-1 were rewarded when the BNP nominated him for the seat in the 2026 general election. With the Awami League out of the picture, there were many candidates for the seat. It was expected to come down to a four-way race between the BNP, the Bangladesh Jamaat-e-Islami, Kabir Miah of the Gono Odhikar Parishad, and independent candidate Ashraful Alam. The last two were in prison, but Kabir Miah, an Awami League rebel, had lost narrowly to Faruk Khan in 2014.

Mollah is married to Sabrina Binte Ahmed, a political analyst with a background in student politics at the University of Dhaka. Molla and his wife campaigned heavily in the constituency. He met voters in his home, called on influential groups, and addressed gatherings at schools and marketplaces. He and his wife went door-to-door handing out leaflets at market stalls and tea shops, and reaching out to voters where they live. Mollah was elected with a majority of 15,133.

Mollah's house was burned down on 19 November 2026 by Awami League activists.

== See also ==
- List of members of the 13th Jatiya Sangsad
