= Shahidul =

Shahidul is a Bengali Muslim given name. It may refer to:

- Shahidul Islam (disambiguation), list of people with the name
- Shahidul Zahir, late Bangladeshi writer
- Shahidul Alam (disambiguation), list of people with that name
- AKM Shahidul Haque, current inspector general of Bangladesh police
