= Shahidul Islam =

Shahidul Islam may refer to:

- Shahidul Islam (Lalu) (died 25 May 2009), known as Lalu, Bangladeshi freedom fighter
- Shahidul Islam (cricketer, born 1982) (born 25 January 1982), Bangladeshi cricketer
- Sheikh Shahidul Islam, former Bangladeshi education minister
- Shahidul Islam Khokon, Bangladeshi film director
- Shahidul Islam (politician, born 1960), Bangladeshi politician
- Shahidul Islam (academic), Bangladesh Nationalist Party politician, MP for Kushtia-2
- Md. Shahidul Islam, Bangladeshi politician
- Mohammed Shahidul Islam, Bangladeshi diplomat
- Mohammad Shahid Islam, Bangladeshi businessman and politician
