= Noor-E-Alam Chowdhury Liton =

Bangladeshi politician

Noor-E-Alam Chowdhury
- নূর-ই-আলম চৌধুরী
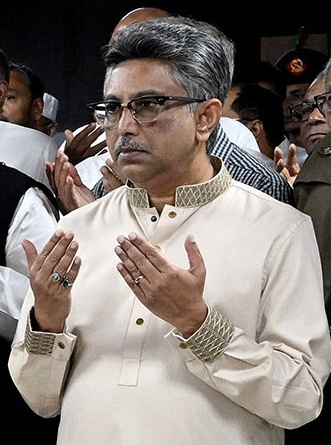
- Alam in 2023

Member of the Bangladesh Parliament for Madaripur-1
- In office 14 July 1996 – 6 August 2024
- Preceded by: Abul Khair Chowdhury
- In office 5 March 1991 – 24 November 1995
- Preceded by: Ilias Ahmed Chowdhury

11th Chief Whip of Parliament
- In office 30 January 2019 – 6 August 2024
- Speaker: Shirin Sharmin Chaudhury
- Preceded by: A. S. M. Feroz
- Succeeded by: Nurul Islam Moni

Personal details
- Born: 1 June 1964 (age 61) Faridpur district, East Pakistan, Pakistan
- Party: Bangladesh Awami League
- Relations: Mujibur Rahman Chowdhury (brother)
- Parent: Ilias Ahmed Chowdhury (father)
- Relatives: Sheikh-Wazed family

Noor-E-Alam Chowdhury (born 1 June 1964; also known by the name Liton) is a Bangladesh Awami League politician and a former Jatiya Sangsad member representing the Madaripur-1 constituency and the former chief whip of the Jatiya Sangsad. He has been missing, along with his brother Mujibur Rahman Chowdhury (Nixon) and other family members, since the resignation of his aunt Sheikh Hasina on 5 August 2024.

== Early life ==
Chowdhury was born on 1 June 1964 to a Bengali Muslim family of Chowdhuries in the village of Duttapara in Shibchar, Madaripur, then part of East Pakistan's Faridpur district. His parents, Ilias Ahmed Chowdhury and Sheikh Feroza Begum, are cousins of Prime Minister Sheikh Hasina. His father was a politician and came from a zamindar family, whilst his mother, Sheikh Feroza Begum, was a housewife. Chowdhury had Iraqi Arab ancestry through both of his grandmothers, who were direct descendants of the 17th-century Muslim preacher Sheikh Abdul Awal of Baghdad.

Chowdhury completed the Higher Secondary School Certificate examination. He is the grandnephew of Sheikh Mujibur Rahman.

== Career ==
Chowdhury's father, Ilias Ahmed Chowdhury, died in May 1991 while serving as the member of parliament from Madaripur-1. Chowdhury contested in the subsequent by-election after the death of his father and was elected to parliament as an Awami League candidate in September 1991.

Chowdhury was re-elected to parliament in June 1996 as a candidate of the Awami League. He received 61,012 votes, while his nearest rival, Abul Khaer Chowdhury of the Bangladesh Nationalist Party, received 29,312 votes.

Chowdhury was re-elected to parliament in 2001 as a candidate of the Awami League. He received 98,898 votes while his nearest rival, Khalilur Rahman Chowdhury of Bangladesh Nationalist Party, received 47,831 votes.

In 2008, Chowdhury was re-elected to parliament as a candidate of the Awami League. He received 119,767 votes while his nearest rival, independent candidate Kamal Zaman Mollah, received 20,443 votes. He is a trustee of the Bangabandhu Memorial Trust. He was a whip of the 9th parliament.

Chowdhury was elected to Parliament in 2014 from Madaripur-1 as an Awami League candidate, unopposed as the election was boycotted by opposition parties. He was appointed the whip of the Parliament. He is also a member of the parliamentary standing committee on Ministry of Housing and Public Works. He was the chairman of the Parliamentary Standing Committee on Ministry of Shipping. In February 2017, he was made secretary of the Awami League Parliamentary Party. He is the chief advisor of the Shibchar Upazila Shomity.

In 2018, Chowdhury was re-elected in the rigged election to parliament as a candidate of the Awami League from Madaripur-1. He received 227,393 votes, while his nearest rival, Sazzad Hossain Siddiqui Lablu of the Bangladesh Nationalist Party, received 313 votes. He was appointed chief whip of the 11th parliament.
