= Mst. Tahmina Begum =

Bangladeshi politician

- মোসাম্মৎ তাহমিনা বেগম

Member of the Bangladesh Parliament for Madaripur-3
- In office 30 January 2024 – 6 August 2024
- Preceded by: Abdus Sobhan Golap

Member of the Bangladesh Parliament for Reserved Women's Seat-41
- In office 30 January 2019 – 29 January 2024
- Preceded by: Quazi Rosy
- Succeeded by: Monnujan Sufian

Personal details
- Born: 25 August 1952 (age 73) Madaripur, East Pakistan
- Party: Bangladesh Awami League
- Education: M.A.

Mst. Tahmina Begum (born 25 August 1952) is a Bangladesh Awami League politician and a former Jatiya Sangsad member representing the Madaripur-3 constituency. As of 2024, she was president of Kalkini Upazila Awami League.

== Career ==
Begum was elected to parliament from a reserved seat as a Bangladesh Awami League candidate in 2019.

Begum was elected to Parliament on 7 January 2024 from Madaripur-3 as an independent candidate. She defeated Awami League candidate Abdus Sobhan Golap. She received 96,633 votes, while her nearest rival, Golap, received 61,971 votes.
