= Mujib =

Mujib (Arabic: مجيب, romanized: Mujīb) may refer to:

- Mujib (name), a contraction used for personal names containing Mujib
- Al-Mujib (Arabic: المجيب, romanized: al-Mujīb), a name of God in Islam
- Mujibism, a term used to describe the ideology of Sheikh Mujibur Rahman
- Wadi Mujib, ancient Arnon: river in Jordan
