= Anisur Rahaman =

Bangladeshi politician

Members of Parliament
- Incumbent
- Assumed office 17 February 2026
- Preceded by: Abdus Sobhan Golap
- Constituency: Madaripur-3

Personal details
- Party: Bangladesh Nationalist Party
- Occupation: Politician

Anisur Rahaman Talukdar Khokon is a Bangladesh Nationalist Party politician and a member of Jatiya Sangsad representing the Madaripur-3 constituency.
