= Md. Shahidul Islam =

Bangladeshi politician (born 1971)

- মোঃ শহিদুল ইসলাম

Member of the Bangladesh Parliament for Faridpur-4
- Incumbent
- Assumed office 17 February 2026
- Preceded by: Mujibur Rahman Chowdhury

Personal details
- Born: 20 April 1971 (age 55) Nagarkanda Upazila, Faridpur District
- Party: Bangladesh Nationalist Party

Md. Shahidul Islam is a Bangladeshi politician. As of March 2026, he is serving as a member of parliament from Faridpur-4.

== Early life ==
Islam was born on 20 April 1971 at Nagarkanda Upazila under Faridpur District.
