= Sayeed Ahmed Aslam =

Bangladeshi politician

- Incumbent
- Assumed office 17 February 2026
- Preceded by: Iqbal Hossain Apu
- Constituency: Shariatpur-1

Personal details
- Born: Damudya Upazila, Shariatpur
- Party: Bangladesh Nationalist Party

Sayeed Ahmed Aslam is a Bangladeshi businessman and politician, who is the current MP of Shariatpur-1.

== Career ==
Ahmed is a wealthy businessman. He is the owner of Ahmed Shipping lines, Ahmed Inland Shipping Agency, A K International and Ahmed Airways Services. He is also serving as the Chairman of Global Insurance Limited.

Ahmed contested in the 2026 Bangladeshi general election as a Bangladesh Nationalist Party candidate. He successfully won with 77,398 votes. He notably received media attention for officially being the richest MP in the 13th Jatiya Sangsad, after declaring assets worth nearly Tk1,200 crore.
