= Saleha Mosharraf =

Bangladeshi politician

- সালেহা মোশাররফ

Member of Parliament for Faridpur-4
- In office October 1999 – October 2001
- Preceded by: Mosharraf Hossain
- Succeeded by: Abdur Razzaq

Member of Parliament for Reserved Women's Seat-20
- In office 25 January 2009 – 24 January 2014
- Succeeded by: Dilara Begum

Personal details
- Born: 1 May 1949
- Died: 28 August 2014 (aged 65); Faridpur Sadar Upazila, Bangladesh
- Political party: Bangladesh Awami League
- Spouse: Mosharraf Hossain

Saleha Mosharraf (1 May 1949 – 28 August 2014) was a Bangladesh Awami League politician and a Jatiya Sangsad member from the Faridpur-4 constituency.

== Career ==
Mosharraf was married to Mosharraf Hossain, a member of parliament from Faridpur-4 and former member of the Mukti Bahini. Following the death of her husband, by-elections were called in his constituency. She was elected to the parliament from that constituency. She was selected to parliament in 2009 for a women's reserved seat. She served as the president of Sadarpur Upazila unit of Bangladesh Awami League.

== Death ==
Mosharraf died on 29 August 2014 at the Faridpur Diabetic Medical College Hospital.
