= Ilias Ahmed Chowdhury =

Bangladeshi politician

Member of Parliament for Madaripur-1 constituency
- In office 27 February 1991 – September 1991
- Preceded by: Abul Khair Chowdhury
- Succeeded by: Noor-E-Alam Chowdhury Liton

Personal details
- Born: 15 August 1934; Duttapara, Madaripur, Faridpur district, Bengal Province
- Died: 18 May 1991 (aged 56); Dhaka, Bangladesh
- Political party: Bangladesh Awami League
- Spouse: Sheikh Feroza Begum
- Relations: Sheikh family of Tungipara (maternal)
- Children: Liton; Nixon
- Parent(s): Nuruddin Ahmed Chowdhury (father); Sheikh Fatema Begum (mother)

Ilias Ahmed Chowdhury (15 August 1934 – 18 May 1991) was a Bangladesh Awami League politician and Member of Parliament from Madaripur-1.

== Early life and family ==
Chowdhury was born on 15 August 1934 to a Bengali Muslim family of Chowdhuries in the village of Duttapara in Shibchar, Madaripur, then part of the Bengal Province's Faridpur district. His father, Nuruddin Ahmed Chowdhury, was a zamindar and his mother, Sheikh Fatema Begum, was a housewife from the Sheikh family of Tungipara. Ilias Ahmed Chowdhury had Iraqi Arab ancestry through his maternal grandfather Sheikh Lutfar Rahman, who was a direct descendant of 17th-century Muslim preacher Sheikh Abdul Awal of Baghdad.

He was the paternal cousin of Prime Minister Sheikh Hasina. He was the nephew of President Sheikh Mujibur Rahman. His mother, Sheikh Fatema Begum, was the eldest sister of Sheikh Mujibur Rahman. Chowdhury was married to his first-cousin Sheikh Feroza Begum, the daughter of his mother's younger sister, Sheikh Asia Begum. Their sons Liton Chowdhury and Nixon Chowdhury are both politicians and members of parliament in Bangladesh.

== Career ==
Chowdhury was elected to Parliament on 1991 Bangladeshi general election from Madaripur-1 as a Bangladesh Awami League candidate. His closest rival was Abul Khaer Chowdhury of the Jatiya Party.

== Death and legacy ==
Chowdhury died in 1991 while in office. His son, Noor-E-Alam Chowdhury Liton, served was elected Member of parliament from Madaripur-1 after his death. Ilias Ahmed Chowdhury Degree College is a college in Madaripur District named after him.
