= Mohammad Azharul Haque =

Bangladeshi politician

- মোহাম্মদ আজহারুল হক

Member of Bangladesh Parliament

Personal details
- Party: Jatiya Party (Ershad)

Mohammad Azharul Haque is a Jatiya Party (Ershad) politician and a former member of parliament for Faridpur-4.

== Career ==
Haque was elected to parliament from Faridpur-4 as a Jatiya Party candidate in 1986 and 1988.
