= Abdur Razzaq (Faridpur-4 politician) =

Bangladeshi politician, lawyer

Advocate Abdur Razzaq
- আবদুর রাজ্জাক

Member of Parliament for Faridpur-4
- In office 1 October 2001 – 2002
- Preceded by: Saleha Mosharraf
- Succeeded by: Chowdhury Akmal Ibne Yusuf

Personal details
- Died: Faridpur District, Bangladesh
- Political party: Bangladesh Awami League

Abdur Razzaq was a Bangladeshi lawyer and politician. He was elected Member of Parliament from Faridpur-4 Constituency in the Eighth National Parliament Election held in 2001. He died while a Member of Parliament.
