= Chowdhury Akmal Ibne Yusuf =

Bangladeshi politician (died 2021)

- চৌধুরী আকমল ইবনে ইউসুফ

Member of Parliament for
- In office January 2002 – 28 October 2006
- Preceded by: Abdur Razzaq
- Succeeded by: Nilufer Zafarullah
- In office 19 March 1996 – 30 March 1996
- Preceded by: Mosharraf Hossain
- Succeeded by: Mosharraf Hossain

Personal details
- Born: 1945/1946
- Died: 19 December 2021 (aged 75) Dhaka, Bangladesh
- Party: Bangladesh Nationalist Party
- Parent: Yusuf Ali Chowdhury (father)
- Relatives: Chowdhury Kamal Ibne Yusuf (brother)

Chowdhury Akmal Ibne Yusuf (1945/1946 – 19 December 2021) was a Bangladesh Nationalist Party politician and served as a Jatiya Sangsad member twice representing the Faridpur-4 constituency in 1996 and again during 2002–2006. He died on 19 December 2021, at the age of 75. Yusuf's family belonged the Amirabad Estate, Faridpur.
