= M. H. Khan Manju =

Bangladeshi politician

- এম এইচ খান মঞ্জু

Member of the Bangladesh Parliament for Gopalganj-1
- In office 1988–1990
- Preceded by: Sarwar Jan Chowdhury
- Succeeded by: Kazi Abdur Rashid

Personal details
- Born: Gopalganj District
- Party: Bangladesh Nationalist Party
- Parent: Father-Late Haji Idris Ali Khan Mother-Late Guljar Begum

M. H. Khan Manju is a Bangladesh Nationalist Party politician. He was elected a member of parliament from Gopalganj-1 in 1988. He is also popular in the native areas of Gopalgonj 1 seat. Manju is a former minister of Bangladeshi ministry.

Manju is the CEO of Comfort Group of Industries. He has a family.

== Career ==
M. H. Khan Manju is the former president of Gopalganj district BNP. He was elected a member of parliament from Gopalganj-1 in 1988 Bangladeshi general election. He was defeated by participating in the national elections of the 1991 Bangladeshi general election as a Bangladesh Nationalist Party candidate.
