= Syed Abul Hossain =

Bangladeshi politician and businessman (1951–2023)

- সৈয়দ আবুল হোসেন

Minister of Information and Communication Technology
- In office 6 December 2011 – 12 August 2012
- Prime Minister: Sheikh Hasina
- Preceded by: Office established
- Succeeded by: Mostafa Faruk Mohammad

Minister of Communications
- In office 6 January 2009 – 6 December 2011
- Prime Minister: Sheikh Hasina
- Preceded by: Nazmul Huda
- Succeeded by: Obaidul Quader

State Minister of Local Government, Rural Development and Co-operatives
- In office 23 June 1996 – 17 August 1997
- Prime Minister: Sheikh Hasina
- Succeeded by: Mofazzal Hossain Chowdhury

Member of Parliament for Madaripur-3
- In office 5 March 1991 – 24 November 1995
- Preceded by: Sheikh Shahidul Islam
- Succeeded by: Ganesh Chandra Haldar
- In office 14 July 1996 – 24 January 2014
- Succeeded by: Towfiquzzaman Shaheen

Personal details
- Born: 1 August 1951 Madaripur, Dhaka Division, East Bengal, Pakistan
- Died: 25 October 2023 (aged 72) Dhaka, Bangladesh
- Party: Bangladesh Awami League
- Spouse: Khwaja Nargis Hossain (m. 1979)
- Children: Rubaiyat Hossain; Iffat Hossain
- Relatives: Shah Ali Baghdadi (ancestor)
- Education: University of Dhaka

Syed Abul Hossain (1 August 1951 – 25 October 2023) was a Bangladeshi businessman and politician. He was the managing director and chairman of SAHCO International Ltd. He served as a member of the Bangladesh Parliament (Jatiya Sangsad) for four terms during 1991–1995 and 1996–2014 representing the Madaripur-3 constituency. He served as the minister of information and communication technology (2011–2012), minister of communications (2009–2011) and state minister of local government, rural development and co-operatives (1996–1997).

== Background and education ==
Abul Hossain was born on 1 October 1951 to a Bengali family of Hashemite Syeds in the village of Dasar, Madaripur in the Dacca district of the Bengal Presidency. His parents were Syed Atahar Ali and Syeda Sufia Ali. The family were descended from Syed Shah Usman, a son of Shah Ali Baghdadi, who settled in Dasar in 1504. In business management, Abul Hossain completed his bachelor's degree from the University of Dhaka in 1972, and also completed his master's degree in 1974.

== Business and political career ==
After completing his education, Abul Hossain joined government service and later ventured into business. He founded and was the chief of SAHCO International Ltd.

Abul Hossain was elected as a member of the Jatiya Sangsad in four general elections: in 1991, 1996, 2001 and 2008. He also served as communication minister from 2009 to 2012, and the minister of information and communication technology. He was the international affairs secretary of the Bangladesh Awami League during 1991–2012.

== Padma Bridge controversy ==
In an investigation by Royal Canadian Mounted Police (RCMP), the Canadian construction company SNC-Lavalin had offered bribes to at least six Bangladeshis, including Abul Hossain, to obtain the consultant's job in the Padma bridge project. The RCMP shared the information with the Anti-Corruption Commission of Bangladesh (ACC). Following the findings, the World Bank alleged that Abul Hossain was a conspirator in the graft scandal regarding the bridge construction project. Abul Hossain denied the allegations that he misused his position as a minister. He resigned from his office on 23 July 2012 (effective 23 August 2012). He was acquitted in 2014 by the Bangladeshi courts and the Anti-Corruption Commission.

The Canadian case was dropped in 2017 after Judge Ian Nordheimer found that the RCMP did not have sufficient evidence to justify their initial wiretap, although Abul Hossain had already been acquitted by a lower Canadian court.

Syed Abul Hossain resigned from his post as communication minister due to alleged complain of corruption conspiracy in awarding the contract of Supervision consultancy of Padma Bridge project. Abul Hossain was subjected to extensive scrutiny in Bangladesh and aboard. However, no evidence was found against him. Eventually, the Bangladesh Anticorruption Commission, after detailed investigation and inquiry, found nothing against the accused and dismissed the case. The Canadian case was dropped in 2017 after Judge Ian Nordheimer found that the RCMP did not have sufficient evidence to justify their initial complaint. He dismissed the case and all the accused in the case were acquitted of the charges. Prime Minister Sheikh Hasina supported Abul Hossain and termed him as a patriot. Abul Hossain was part of her entourage during the inauguration of Padma Bridge on 25 June 2022 and was seen next to her. His contribution is well-noted in finishing the initial work design, land acquisition, etc. of Padma Bridge project in record time. Abul Hossain was also instrumental in creating the initial plan and project development for Dhaka Elevated Expressway, Karnafuli Tunnel, Metro Rail etc.

== Personal life ==
Abul Hossain married Begum Khwaja Nargis in September 1979. They have two daughters, Rubaiyat Hossain and Iffat Hossain.

Abul Hossain founded educational institutions including Kalkini Syed Abul Hossain University College, Syed Abul Hossain College, D.K. Ideal Syed Atahar Ali Academy and College, Khaserhat High School and College, Mostafapur High School and College, Sheikh Hasina Academy and Women's College and Syed Abul Hossain Academy. In 2019, he received the Bidyashagar Award in Kolkata.

=== Death ===
Syed Abul Hossain was admitted to the United Hospital Limited in Dhaka after suffering a cardiac arrest on 24 October 2023. He later died while undergoing treatment. Hossain was 72.
