= Gopalganj-1 =

Bangladeshi parliamentary constituency

Coordinates: 23.32°N 89.87°E

- Constituency for the Jatiya Sangsad
- District: Gopalganj District
- Division: Dhaka Division
- Electorate: 399,510 (2026)

Current constituency
- Created: 1984
- Party: Bangladesh Nationalist Party
- Member: Md. Selimuzzaman Mollah
- ← 214 Faridpur-4 216 Gopalganj-2 →

Gopalganj-1 is a constituency represented in the Jatiya Sangsad (National Parliament) of Bangladesh since 2026 by Md. Selimuzzaman Mollah of the Bangladesh Nationalist Party.

== Boundaries ==
The constituency encompasses Muksudpur Upazila and seven union parishads of Kashiani Upazila: Kashiani, Mamudpur, Maheshpur, Parulia, Rajpat, Ratail, and Sajail.

== History ==
The constituency was created in 1984 from a Faridpur constituency when the former Faridpur District was split into five districts: Rajbari, Faridpur, Gopalganj, Madaripur, and Shariatpur.

== Members of Parliament ==
Election	Member	Party
1986	Sarwar Jan Chowdhury	Jatiya Party
1988	M. H. Khan Monjur	
1991	Kazi Abdur Rashid	Awami League
Feb 1996	Sharfuzzaman Jahangir	Bangladesh Nationalist Party
Jun 1996	Faruk Khan	Awami League
2026	Md. Selimuzzaman Mollah	Bangladesh Nationalist Party

== Elections ==
=== Elections in the 2020s ===
General Election 2026: Gopalganj-1
Party	Candidate	Votes	%	±%
BNP	Md. Selimuzzaman Mollah	69,462	36.2	N/A
GOP	Md. Kabir Mia	54,329	28.3	N/A
Jamaat	Md. Abdul Hamid Molla	34,635	18.1	N/A
Independent	Ashraful Alam	21,276	11.1	N/A
IAB	Md. Mizanur Rahman	5,870	3.1	N/A
Independent	M. Anisul Islam	3,257	1.7	N/A
Independent	Md. Kayyum Ali Khan	2,180	1.1	N/A
JP(E)	Sultan Zaman Khan	621	0.3	N/A
CPB	Nirad Baran Majumder	180	0.1	N/A
Majority		15,133	7.9	N/A
Turnout		191,810	48.0	N/A
BNP gain from AL				

=== Elections in the 2010s ===
General Election 2014: Gopalganj-1
Party	Candidate	Votes	%	±%
AL	Faruk Khan	240,304	97.6	+6.0
JP(E)	Deepa Majumdar	5,863	2.4	N/A
Majority		234,441	95.2	+8.6
Turnout		246,167	89.0	+6.4
AL hold				

=== Elections in the 2000s ===
General Election 2008: Gopalganj-1
Party	Candidate	Votes	%	±%
AL	Faruk Khan	183,234	91.6	+13.1
BNP	Md. Salimuzzaman Molla	9,986	5.0	−5.9
IAB	Md. Ruhul Amin	6,810	3.4	N/A
Majority		173,248	86.6	+19.0
Turnout		200,030	82.6	+10.5
AL hold				

General Election 2001: Gopalganj-1
Party	Candidate	Votes	%	±%
AL	Faruk Khan	145,391	78.5	−8.4
BNP	Md. Mahbbat Jan Chowdhury	20,136	10.9	+7.3
Independent	Ali Azam	14,755	8.0	N/A
Independent	Deepa Majumdar	3,680	2.0	N/A
IJOF	Md. Tayebur Rahman Sharif	828	0.4	N/A
Bangladesh Samajtantrik Dal (Basad-Khalekuzzaman)	Moshayed Hossain Dhali	396	0.2	N/A
Majority		125,255	67.6	−15.5
Turnout		185,186	72.1	−1.3
AL hold				

=== Elections in the 1990s ===
General Election June 1996: Gopalganj-1
Party	Candidate	Votes	%	±%
AL	Faruk Khan	119,536	86.9	+21.8
Jamaat	A. K. Imdadul Haque	5,236	3.8	−7.7
BNP	Khairul Baki Mian	4,914	3.6	−5.5
JP(E)	Julfiqar Ali	3,502	2.5	+2.0
IOJ	Niamat Ullah	3,124	2.3	N/A
Zaker Party	Md. Anwarul Islam	615	0.4	0.0
Independent	Md. Mosharaf Hossain Dhali	293	0.2	N/A
Bangladesh Muslim League (Jamir Ali)	Sharif Emraul Islam	182	0.1	N/A
Independent	Bibuti Bhushan Biswas	151	0.1	N/A
Majority		114,300	83.1	+30.0
Turnout		137,553	73.4	+20.7
AL hold				

General Election 1991: Gopalganj-1
Party	Candidate	Votes	%	±%
AL	Kazi Abdur Rashid	79,219	65.1	
BAKSAL	Mukul Chandra Basu	14,602	12.0	
Jamaat	A. K. Imdadul Haque	13,992	11.5	
BNP	Khairul Baki Mian	11,136	9.1	
JP(E)	Zulfikar Ali	656	0.5	
Bangladesh Hindu League	Suresh Chandra Biswash	641	0.5	
Independent	Md. Lutfar	484	0.4	
Zaker Party	A. Mannan	475	0.4	
JSD	Azizur Rahman	197	0.2	
Independent	M. H. Khan Monjur	193	0.2	
Independent	Md. Farooq Ahmmad Talukdar	81	0.1	
Bangladesh National Congress	Monindra Sarkar	80	0.1	
Majority		64,617	53.1	
Turnout		121,756	52.7	
AL gain from JP(E)				
