= Delwar Hossain (Faridpur politician) =

Bangladeshi politician (c.1934–2020)

- দেলওয়ার হোসেন

Member of Parliament for Faridpur-4

Personal details
- Born: c. 1934 Faridpur District
- Died: 24 July 2020 Faridpur District
- Party: Bangladesh Awami League

Delwar Hossain (c. 1934–24 July 2020) was a Bangladesh Awami League politician and a former member of parliament for Faridpur-4.

== Career ==
Delwar Hossain was a freedom fighter. He was elected to parliament from Faridpur-4 as a Bangladesh Awami League candidate in 1973.

He was the principal of Faridpur Yasin College, Madhukhali Government Ain Uddin College, Kaderdi Degree College, Boalmari College and the headmaster of Boalmari George Academy.

== Death ==
Hossain died on 24 July 2020.
