= K M Babar =

Bangladeshi politician (born 1982)

- কে এম বাবর

Member of Parliament
- Incumbent
- Assumed office 17 February 2026
- Preceded by: Sheikh Selim
- Constituency: Gopalganj-2

Personal details
- Born: 25 January 1982 (age 44) Gopalganj Sadar Upazila, Gopalganj District
- Party: Bangladesh Nationalist Party

K M Babar is a Bangladeshi politician. As of March 2026, he is serving as a member of parliament from Gopalganj-2.

== Early life ==
Babar was born on 25 January 1982 at Gopalganj Sadar Upazila under Gopalganj District.

== Personal life ==
Babar is the owner of a private clinic in Gopalganj. On 18 November 2026, that clinic was torched by armed members of the banned Awami League, the Chhatra League, and the Jubo League, leading to the evacuation of several patients being treated there.
