= Bangabandhu (disambiguation) =

Bangabandhu ('Friend of Bengal') is a popular title of Sheikh Mujibur Rahman (1920–1975), a Bangladeshi politician and statesman.

Bangabandhu may also refer to:

- Munshi Mohammad Meherullah, also called Bangabandhu
- Bangabandhu Cup, an international football tournament

== See also ==
- List of things named after Sheikh Mujibur Rahman
- Mujibur Rahman (disambiguation)
- Mujib: The Making of a Nation, a 2023 Indian-Bangladeshi film about Sheikh Mujibur Rahman by Shyam Benegal
