= Faridpur-4 =

Constituency of Bangladesh's Jatiya Sangsad

Coordinates: 23.39°N 89.98°E

- Constituency for the Jatiya Sangsad
- District: Faridpur District
- Division: Dhaka Division
- Electorate: 496,706 (2026)

Current constituency
- Created: 1973
- Party: Bangladesh Nationalist Party
- Member: Md. Shahidul Islam
- ← 213 Faridpur-3 215 Gopalganj-1 →

Faridpur-4 is a constituency represented in the Jatiya Sangsad (National Parliament) of Bangladesh since 2026 by Md. Shahidul Islam of the Bangladesh Nationalist Party.

== Boundaries ==
The constituency encompasses Bhanga and Charbhadrasan upazilas, and all but one union parishad of Sadarpur Upazila: Krishnapur.

== History ==
The constituency was created for the first general elections in newly independent Bangladesh, held in 1973.

Ahead of the 2008 general election, the Election Commission redrew constituency boundaries to reflect population changes revealed by the 2001 Bangladesh census. The 2008 redistricting altered the boundaries of the constituency.

== Members of Parliament ==
Election	Member	Party
1973	Delwar Hossain	Awami League
1979	Shah Mohammad Abu Zafar	Awami League
Major Boundary Changes
1986	Mohammad Azharul Haque	Jatiya Party
1988	Mohammad Azharul Haque	Jatiya Party
1991	Mosharraf Hossain	Awami League
Feb 1996	Chowdhury Akmal Ibne Yusuf	Bangladesh Nationalist Party
Jun 1996	Mosharraf Hossain	Awami League
1999 by-election	Saleha Mosharraf	Awami League
2001	Abdur Razzak	Awami League
2002 by-election	Chowdhury Akmal Ibne Yusuf	Bangladesh Nationalist Party
2008	Nilufer Zafarullah	Awami League
2014	Mujibur Rahman Chowdhury	Independent
2018	Mujibur Rahman Chowdhury	Independent
2024	Mujibur Rahman Chowdhury	Independent
2026	Md. Shahidul Islam	Bangladesh Nationalist Party

== Elections ==
=== Elections in the 2020s ===
General Election 2026: Faridpur-4
Party	Candidate	Votes	%	±%
BNP	Md. Shahidul Islam	127,443	46.3	N/A
Jamaat	Md. Sarwar Hossain	75,805	27.6	N/A
Independent	AAM Mujahid Beg	56,160	20.4	N/A
IAB	Md. Ishak Chokdar	11,498	4.2	N/A
Independent	Md. Mujibur Hossain	1,708	0.6	N/A
BKM	Mizanur Rahman	1,118	0.4	N/A
CPB	Ataur Rahman	714	0.3	N/A
JP(E)	Rayhan Jamil	550	0.2	N/A
Majority		51,638	18.8	N/A
Turnout		274,996	55.4	N/A
BNP gain from Independent				

=== Elections in the 2010s ===
General Election 2018: Faridpur-4
Party	Candidate	Votes	%	±%
Independent	Mujibur Rahman Chowdhury	144,179	57.4	−0.1
AL	Kazi Zafarullah	94,234	37.5	−4.7
BNP	Khandker Iqbal Hossain	12,380	4.9	N/A
Majority		49,945	19.9	
Turnout		250,793	67.66	
Registered electors		370,695		
Independent hold				

General Election 2014: Faridpur-4
Party	Candidate	Votes	%	±%
Independent	Mujibur Rahman Chowdhury	98,300	57.5	N/A
AL	Kazi Zafarullah	72,248	42.2	−24.0
Jatiya Party (M)	Mohammad Zakir Hossain	559	0.3	N/A
Majority		26,052	15.2	−21.5
Turnout		171,107	53.2	+16.5
Independent gain from AL				

=== Elections in the 2000s ===
General Election 2008: Faridpur-4
Party	Candidate	Votes	%	±%
AL	Nilufer Zafarullah	157,491	66.0	+63.3
Zaker Party	Mostafa Amir Faisal	70,085	29.4	N/A
IAB	Shamsuddin	6,468	2.7	N/A
BNP	Shah Alam Reza	3,937	1.7	−92.9
Majority		87,406	36.7	−55.2
Turnout		237,981	85.9	+31.6
AL gain from BNP				

Abdur Razzaq stood for two seats in the 2001 general election: Faridpur-4 and Shariatpur-3. After winning both, he chose to represent the latter and quit the former, triggering a by-election. Chowdhury Akmal Ibne Yusuf was elected in a January 2002 by-election.

Faridpur-4 by-election, 2002
Party	Candidate	Votes	%	±%
BNP	Chowdhury Akmal Ibne Yusuf	85,047	94.6	+91.2
AL	Saleha Mosharraf	2,390	2.7	−47.1
Independent	Monowara Begum	1,643	1.8	N/A
Jatiya Party (M)	Md. Nurul Abedin	821	0.9	N/A
Majority		82,657	91.9	+88.7
Turnout		89,901	54.3	−13.5
BNP gain from AL				

General Election 2001: Faridpur-4
Party	Candidate	Votes	%	±%
AL	Abdur Razzaq	56,231	49.8	
Independent	Chowdhury Akmal Ibne Yusuf	52,586	46.6	
BNP	Md. Zahirul Haq	3,868	3.4	
Independent	A. K. Shajahan Haider	177	0.2	
Majority		3,645	3.2	
Turnout		112,862	67.8	
AL hold				

Mosharaf Hossain died in August 1999. His widow, Saleha Mosharraf, was elected in an October by-election.

=== Elections in the 1990s ===
General Election June 1996: Faridpur-4
Party	Candidate	Votes	%	±%
AL	Mosharraf Hossain	45,580	48.4	−1.2
BNP	Chowdhury Akmal Ibne Yusuf	32,630	34.6	+6.3
JP(E)	Azaharul Haque	7,562	8.0	N/A
Jamaat	Abdul Quader Molla	4,906	5.2	N/A
Zaker Party	A. H. M. Nazmul Huda	2,846	3.0	−18.0
IOJ	Md. Nurul Abedin	672	0.7	N/A
Majority		12,950	13.7	−7.6
Turnout		94,196	74.0	+22.8
AL hold				

General Election 1991: Faridpur-4
Party	Candidate	Votes	%	±%
AL	Mosharraf Hossain	43,313	49.6	
BNP	Chowdhury Kamal Ibne Yusuf	24,730	28.3	
Zaker Party	Md. Adel Uddin Hawladar	18,348	21.0	
Bangladesh Janata Party	Md. Abdul Latif Miah	863	1.0	
Majority		18,583	21.3	
Turnout		87,254	51.2	
AL gain from JP(E)				
