= Pirzada Hanzala =

Bangladeshi Islamic scholar and politician

- সাঈদ উদ্দিন আহমেদ হানযালা

Member of the Jatiya Sangsad for Madaripur-1
- Incumbent
- Assumed office 2026
- Constituency: Madaripur-1

Personal details
- Party: Bangladesh Khelafat Majlis
- Profession: Islamic scholar, politician

Saeeed Uddin Ahmad Hanzala, known as Pirzada Hanzala, is a Bangladeshi Islamic scholar and a politician of Bangladesh Khelafat Majlis. He was elected as a member of parliament in the 13th National Parliamentary Election.

== Politics ==
He contested from the Madaripur-1 constituency in Shibchar as a candidate of the Bangladesh Khelafat Majlis under the 11-party electoral alliance, with the rickshaw symbol. In 201 polling centers, he received 63,511 votes and 1,398 votes through postal ballots, making a total of 64,909 votes.

His nearest rival candidate, Nadira Akter of the Bangladesh Nationalist Party (BNP), received 64,291 votes and 233 votes through postal ballots, totaling 64,524 votes. The margin of votes between them was 385.
