= Sheikh Selim =

Bangladeshi politician (born 1949)

Sheikh Fazlul Karim Selim
- শেখ ফজলুল করিম সেলিম
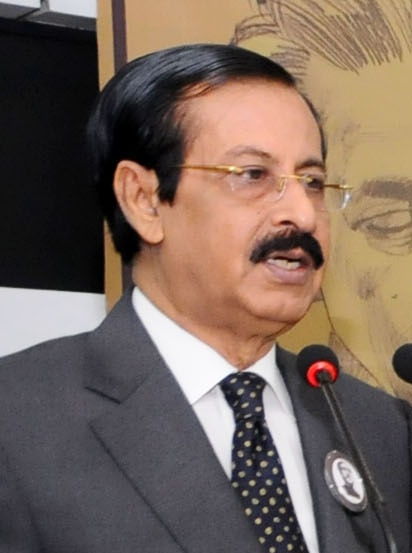
- Selim in 2016

Member of the Bangladesh Parliament for Gopalganj-2
- In office 14 July 1980 – 6 August 2024
- Preceded by: Mollah Jalaluddin Ahmed
- Succeeded by: K M Babar
- In office 5 March 1991 – 24 November 1995
- Succeeded by: Farid Ahmed
- In office 10 July 1986 – 6 December 1987
- Preceded by: Position created

Minister of Health and Family Welfare
- In office 29 December 1999 – 15 July 2001
- Preceded by: Salahuddin Yusuf
- Succeeded by: Abdul Malik

Acting President of the Bangladesh Awami League
- Incumbent
- Assumed office 7 September 2026
- Preceded by: Sheikh Hasina

Personal details
- Born: 2 February 1949 (age 77) Gopalganj, East Bengal, Dominion of Pakistan
- Party: Bangladesh Awami League
- Relations: Sheikh Fazlul Haque Mani (brother); Sheikh Fazle Noor Taposh (nephew); Andaleeve Rahman Partho (nephew)
- Children: Sheikh Fazle Fahim; Sheikh Fazle Nayeem
- Relatives: see Tungipara Sheikh family
- Profession: Politician

Sheikh Fazlul Karim Selim (born 2 February 1949; known as Sheikh Selim) is a Bangladeshi politician who was a 9-term Member of Parliament representing the Gopalganj-2 constituency during 1980–2024. He is currently the senior-most member of the Bangladesh Awami League's presidium. He also served as the minister of health and family welfare during 1999–2001. He has been in hiding ever since the fall of his cousin Sheikh Hasina's government on 5 August 2024.

== Early life and family ==
Sheikh Selim is the son of Sheikh Nurul Haque and Sheikh Asia Begum, sister of Sheikh Mujibur Rahman, former president of Bangladesh. He is the younger brother of Sheikh Fazlul Haque Mani, founder of the Jubo League. He is a first-cousin of former prime minister Sheikh Hasina.

Selim is descended from the Sheikh family of Tungipara from both his parents. His father's grandfather, Qudratullah Sheikh, was the brother of his mother's great-great-grandfather, Ekramullah Sheikh. Sheikh Mujib was both his uncle and nephew, being son of his third-cousin Sheikh Lutfar Rahman.

== Career ==
Sheikh Selim has won parliamentary elections from Gopalganj-2 nine times with 90% of vote, since 1980. He served as the minister for health and family welfare in the first Hasina ministry. He has been the chairman of the Parliamentary Standing Committee on Health and Family Welfare Ministry. He is a presidium member of the Bangladesh Awami League. After the fall of Sheikh Hasina's government through the July-August 2024 mass uprising, the President of Awami League Sheikh Hasina, who has been in exile in India ever since, announced on September 6, 2026 that Sheikh Selim shall serve as the President of her party in case she gets killed upon her possible return to Bangladesh in December 2026.

== Controversies ==
=== 2008 Corruption Case ===
On 23 April 2008, the Bangladesh Anti Corruption Commission sued Sheikh Selim for corruption at the Ramna Police Station. He secured bail from the High Court on 16 September 2008. The High Court, in September, stayed proceeding of the case against Selim. On 24 October 2010, the Supreme Court stayed the High Court order, allowing the case to proceed.

Following the fall of the Sheikh Hasina led Awami League government, his home in Banani was vandalized and burned down in February 2025.

== Personal life ==
Sheikh Selim is married and his in-laws are a zamindar family of Muslim Chowdhuries from Daudkandi. His eldest son Sheikh Fazle Fahim served as president of the Federation of Bangladesh Chambers of Commerce & Industries and is married to the daughter of businessman Moosa Bin Shamsher. They have 3 children, Sheikh Zaharat Maanha, Sheikh Fardan Yavand and Sheikh Farzaad Zaidan. Another son, Sheikh Nayem, is married to the daughter of BNP politician Iqbal Hassan Mahmood. One of Selim's grandsons, Zayan Chowdhary, died in the 2019 Sri Lanka Easter bombings. The child's father, Moshiul Haque Chowdhary, was wounded, though his mother, Selim's daughter Sheikh Amina Sultana Sonia, was unharmed.
