= Faridpur-5 =

Constituency of Bangladesh's Jatiya Sangsad

- Former constituency for the Jatiya Sangsad
- District: Faridpur District
- Division: Dhaka Division

Former constituency
- Created: 1973
- Abolished: 2006

Faridpur-5 is a defunct constituency represented in the Jatiya Sangsad (National Parliament) of Bangladesh abolished in 2006.

== Members of Parliament ==
Election	Member	Party
1973	Imam Uddin Ahmad	Awami League
1979	Chowdhury Kamal Ibne Yusuf	Bangladesh Nationalist Party
Major Boundary Changes
1986	Lutfar Rahman Farooq	Awami League
1988	Akhteruzzaman Babul	Jatiya Party
1991	Qazi Abu Yusuf	Awami League
February 1996	Sarwar Jahan Mia	Bangladesh Nationalist Party
June 1996	Qazi Abu Yusuf	Awami League
2001	Kazi Zafarullah	Awami League
Abolished constituency
