= Akhteruzzaman Babul =

Bangladeshi politician (died 2019)

- আখতারুজ্জামান বাবুল

Member of the Bangladesh Parliament for Faridpur-5
- In office 15 April 1988 – 6 December 1990
- Preceded by: Lutfar Rahman Farooq
- Succeeded by: Qazi Abu Yusuf

Personal details
- Born: 1955/56
- Died: 9 March 2019 (aged 63)
- Party: Jatiya Party
- Occupation: Politician

Akhteruzzaman Babul (1955/56 – 9 March 2019) was a Bangladeshi politician belonging to Jatiya Party. He was elected as an MP of Jatiya Sangsad from Faridpur-5 in 1988. He died on 9 March 2019 at the age of 63.
