= Shahidul Alam (disambiguation) =

Shahidul Alam (born 1955) is a Bangladeshi photographer.

Shahidul Alam may also refer to:

- Shahidul Alam Sachchu (1982–2016), Bangladeshi actor
- Shahedul Alam Shahed (born 1991), Bangladeshi midfielder
- Shahidul Alam Sohel (born 1991), Bangladeshi goalkeeper
- Shahidul Alam Talukder (fl. 2001–2006), Bangladeshi politician
