= K. M. Hemayet Ullah Auranga =

Bangladeshi politician

K.M. Hemayet Ullah Auranga
- কে এম হেমায়েত উল্লাহ আওরঙ্গজেব

Member of Parliament for Shariatpur-1
- In office 5 March 1991 – 24 November 1995
- Preceded by: Sardar AKM Nasiruddin
- In office 28 October 2001 – 27 October 2006
- Preceded by: Master Majibur Rahman
- Succeeded by: B. M. Muzammel Haque

Personal details
- Born: 1955 Shariatpur District, East Pakistan, Pakistan
- Died: 3 August 2013 (aged 60) Munshiganj District, Bangladesh
- Cause of death: Road accident
- Party: Bangladesh Nationalist Party

K.M. Hemayet Ullah Auranga (1955 – 3 August 2013) was a Bangladesh Nationalist Party politician and served as the Jatiya Sangsad member from the Shariatpur-1 constituency twice - first in 1991 on the Awami League ticket and in 2001 as an independent candidate.

== Career ==
Auranga was born in 1955 at Dakshin Damudya village, East Pakistan (now in Damudya Upazila, Bangladesh).

Auranga was elected from Shariatpur-1 in 1991 as a candidate of the Bangladesh Awami League. He was elected to Parliament in 2001 as an Independent candidate after losing the Awami League nomination. He joined Bangladesh Nationalist Party in 2007 over internal disputes in the Awami League. He was nominated by the Bangladesh Nationalist Party for the 2008 election in Shariatpur-3. He lost the election to Abdur Razzaq, the Awami League candidate.

== Death ==
Auranga was killed in a road accident in Munshiganj on 3 August 2013.
