= Ruby Ghaznavi =

Bangladeshi activist (1935–2023)

Ruby Ghaznavi (Bengali: রুবি গজনবী; 1935 – January 2023) was a Bangladeshi businesswoman and activist, and a pioneer in the revival of traditional Bangladeshi materials such as Jamdani and crafts. She founded many important organizations, among them Aranya, Karika, National Crafts Council of Bangladesh (NCCB), etc. She was also involved with rights groups such as Naripokkho, Transparency International Bangladesh and Terre Des Hommes.

== Early life ==
Ghaznavi was born in 1935 in Faridpur District, East Bengal, British India. She studied at the Loreto Schools, Kolkata. She did her undergraduate and masters in economics from the University of Dhaka.

== Career ==
Ghaznavi studied natural dye under Kamaladevi Chattopadhyay in 1979 in India.

Ghaznavi started working with traditional dyes in 1982. She founded the National Crafts Council of Bangladesh in 1985 with Quamrul Hassan. She founded and was the chair of A. F Mujibur Rahman Foundation in memory of her brother.

Ghaznavi was inspired by a 1973 craft exhibition founded by Aranya Crafts in 1990. Aranya Crafts was a specialized store that sold handicrafts and clothes made using traditional organic dyes which aided the revival of traditional crafts in Bangladesh. She founded the Natural Colour Project. She sat on the editorial board of Textile Heritage of Bangladesh.

Ghaznavi sold Aranya to Bengal Foundation in January 2011. She served as a founder trustee director of Transparency International Bangladesh. She was a board member of the Bengal Foundation. She was a member of the Women's rights activist group Naripokkho. She was the country director of Terre des Hommes.

Ghaznavi organized the Jamdani Utsav in 2018 at the National Crafts Council of Bangladesh which led to the recognition of Sonargaon as the World Craft City by the World Crafts Council. She was an honorary member of the World Crafts Council.

== Bibliography ==
- Naksha
- Rongin

== Personal life and death ==
Ghaznavi was married to Farhad Ghaznavi. The writer Farah Ghaznavi is her daughter.

Ghaznavi died in Dhaka on 14 January 2023, at the age of 88.
