= Sarwar Jan Miah =

Bangladeshi lawyer and politician

Advocate Sarwar Jan Mia
- ছরওয়ার জান মিয়া

Faridpur-5 constituency Member of Parliament
- In office 15 February 1996 – 12 June 1916
- Preceded by: Qazi Abu Yusuf
- Succeeded by: Qazi Abu Yusuf

Personal details
- Born: 1 April 1926 Faridpur, Bengal Presidency, British India. (current Bangladesh)
- Died: 30 January 2014 (aged 87) Heart Foundation Hospital, Faridpur
- Party: Bangladesh Nationalist Party
- Children: Three sons and two daughters
- Education: University of Dhaka; University of Calcutta; Kolkata Islamia College; Government Rajendra College

Sarwar Jan Mia (1 April 1926 – 30 January 2014) was a Bangladeshi politician and lawyer from Faridpur District who was a member of the then Pakistan National Assembly, then member of the East Pakistan Legislative Assembly and then member of Parliament for Faridpur-5 constituency.

== Early life ==
Mia was born on 1 April 1926 in Sadardi, Bhanga Upazila, Faridpur District, East Bengal, British India. He holds Matriculation from Bhanga High School, IA from Rajendra College, BA from Kolkata Islamia College, MA from Kolkata University and LLB from Dhaka University.

Mia was a roommate and classmate of Sheikh Mujibur Rahman in the unemployed hostel of Kolkata Islamia College.

== Career ==
Mia joined the legal profession in 1951 at Faridpur Bar. He served as the President of Faridpur District Bar for 12 terms, President of Faridpur District Bar Association, Principal of Faridpur Law College and President of Faridpur Muslim Mission.

Mia was the General Secretary of the Greater Faridpur District Muslim League, a member of the then Pakistan Muslim League and later the President of the Faridpur District Bangladesh Nationalist Party for a long time.

In 1958, Mia was elected Vice Chairman of Faridpur Municipality and became a member of Faridpur District Board. He was elected a member of the then Pakistan National Assembly as a candidate of the Muslim League in 1962 and a member of the then East Pakistan Legislative Assembly as a candidate of the Muslim League in 1964.

Mia was elected as a Member of Parliament from the then Faridpur-5 constituency as a candidate of the Bangladesh Nationalist Party in the Sixth Parliamentary Election on 15 January 1996.

== Death ==
Mia died on 30 January 2014 at Faridpur Heart Foundation Hospital, Bangladesh. He was buried at Alipur Cemetery in Faridpur.
