= Faruk Khan =

Bangladeshi politician (born 1951)

Muhammad Faruk Khan
- মুহাম্মদ ফারুক খান
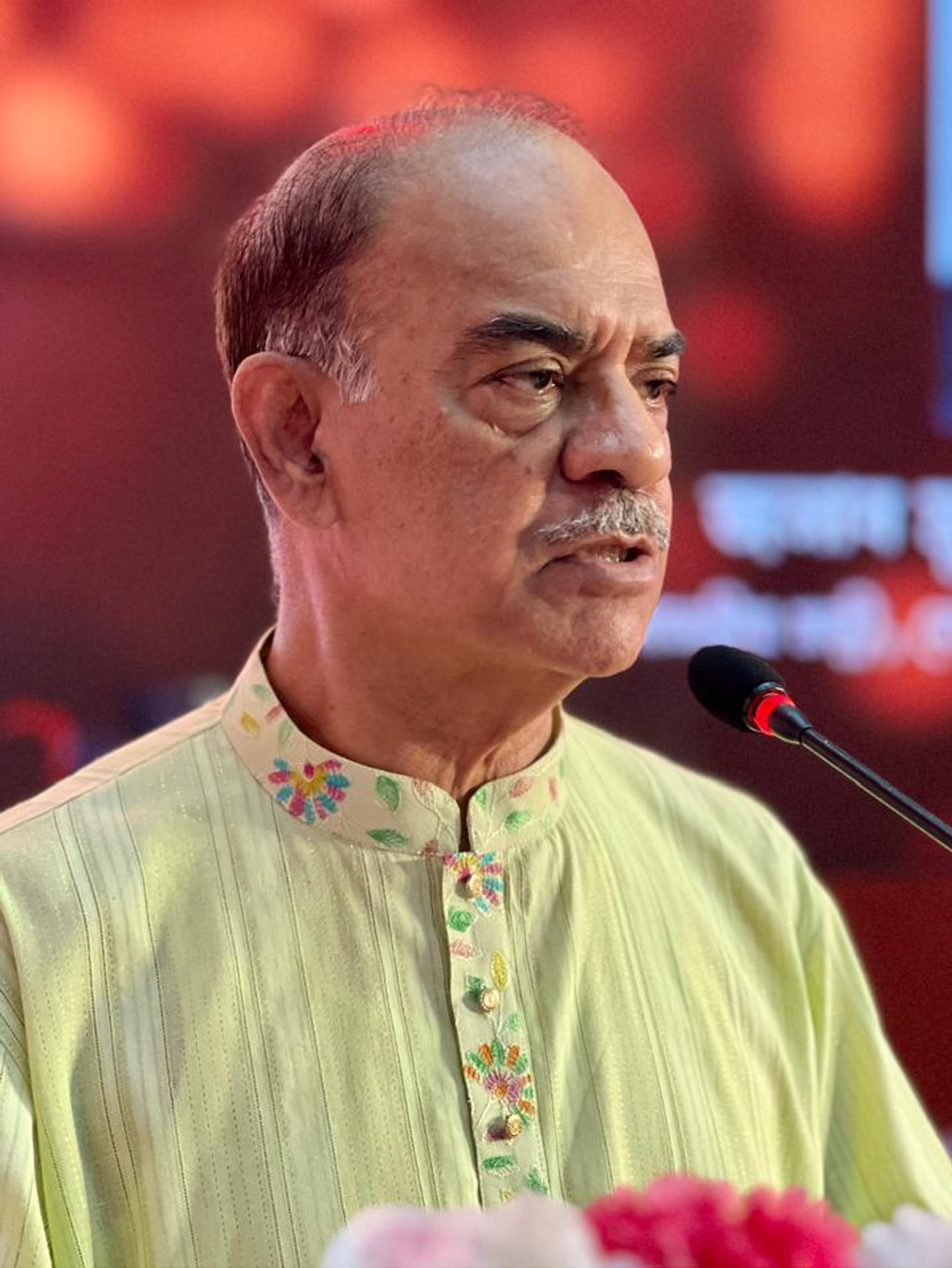
- Khan in 2024

Minister of Civil Aviation and Tourism
- In office 11 January 2024 – 6 August 2024
- Prime Minister: Sheikh Hasina
- Preceded by: A. K. M. Shahjahan Kamal
- Succeeded by: A. F. Hassan Ariff
- In office 7 December 2011 – 21 November 2013
- Prime Minister: Sheikh Hasina
- Preceded by: GM Quader
- Succeeded by: ABM Ruhul Amin Hawlader

Member of the Bangladesh Parliament for Gopalganj-1
- In office 2 June 1996 – 6 August 2024
- Preceded by: Sharfuzzaman Jahangir
- Succeeded by: Md. Selimuzzaman Mollah

Minister of Commerce
- In office 6 January 2009 – 6 December 2011
- Prime Minister: Sheikh Hasina
- Preceded by: Hossain Zillur Rahman
- Succeeded by: GM Quader

Personal details
- Born: 18 September 1951 (age 75) Dhaka, Bangladesh
- Party: Awami League
- Spouse: Nilufar Faruk Khan
- Children: 2

Military service
- Allegiance: Pakistan (before 1972); Bangladesh
- Branch/service: Pakistan Army; Bangladesh Army
- Years of service: 1971-1995
- Rank: Lieutenant Colonel
- Unit: Frontier Force Regiment; East Bengal Regiment
- Commands: CO of 14th East Bengal Regiment; AQ of 24th Infantry Division; Station Commander, Comilla
- Battles/wars: Chittagong Hill Tracts Conflict

Faruk Khan (Bengali: ফারুক খান; born 18 September 1951) is a Bangladeshi politician and a former minister of civil aviation and tourism in the Bangladesh government. Khan is a former parliament member five consecutive times from Gopalganj-1 and a former Commerce and Industry Secretary of the Awami League.

== Early life ==
Khan was born on 18 September 1951 in Dhaka to his parents, Serajul Karim Khan and mother Khaleda Karim Khan. He holds a master's in defense studies from the Defense Services and Staff College in Mirpur.

== Career ==
Khan was commissioned from the 44th Pakistan Military Academy long course in the corps of infantry on 26 March 1971. He retired as a lieutenant colonel on 15 May 1995 from the Bangladesh Army.

Khan was stationed in Dinajpur during the Bangladesh Liberation War. On December 14, 1971, the 23 Punjab Battalion of the Pakistani Army surrendered to the Indian Army. Khan, who was part of that battalion, was reportedly able to avoid being detained as a prisoner of war by identifying himself as a Bengali officer.

The following day, December 15, he was sent to Delhi by the Indian authorities, and following the independence of Bangladesh on December 16, Khan was transferred to the office of the Bangladesh High Commissioner in Kolkata. He later returned to Bangladesh via Benapole on January 14.

Khan served as the member of parliament for the Gopalganj-1 constituency and later served as the minister of civil aviation and tourism and the minister of commerce.

== Personal life ==
Khan is married to Nilufer Faruk Khan, a social worker. Together they have two daughters, Qantara K Khan and Qareena K Khan. His father, Sirajul Karim Khan, was an army officer, and his mother was Khaleda Karim Khan.

== Arrest ==
Khan was arrested in October 2024 from his residence in Dhaka Cantonment following the fall of the Sheikh Hasina-led Awami League government.
