= Kamrun Nesa Nilu =

Bangladeshi politician

Quamrun Nesa Nilu

Member of Parliament for Reserved Women's Seat-23
- In office 1986–1988

Personal details
- Born: c. 1957
- Died: 27 December 2015 (aged 58)
- Party: Jatiya Party
- Occupation: Physician, politician

Kamrun Nesa Nilu (c. 1957 – 27 December 2015) was a Bangladeshi physician and politician from Shariatpur belonging to Jatiya Party. She was a member of the Jatiya Sangsad. She also served as the health advisor of the government of Bangladesh during the regime of Hussein Muhammad Ershad.

== Biography ==
Nilu was elected as a member of the Jatiya Sangsad from Reserved Women's Seat-23 in 1986. She also appointed as the health advisor of the government of Bangladesh.

Nilu died on 27 December 2015 at the age of 58.
