= Madaripur-1 =

Constituency of Bangladesh's Jatiya Sangsad

Coordinates: 23.35°N 90.17°E

- Constituency for the Jatiya Sangsad
- District: Madaripur District
- Division: Dhaka Division
- Electorate: 245,095 (2018)

Current constituency
- Created: 1984
- Party: Bangladesh Khelafat Majlis
- Member: Syed Uddin Ahmad Hanzala
- ← 217 Gopalganj-3 219 Madaripur-2 →

Madaripur-1 is a constituency represented in the Jatiya Sangsad (National Parliament) of Bangladesh since 2026 by Syed Uddin Ahmad Hanzala of the Bangladesh Khelafat Majlis.

== Boundaries ==
The constituency encompasses Shibchar Upazila.

== History ==
The constituency was created in 1984 from the Faridpur-13 constituency when the former Faridpur District was split into five districts: Rajbari, Faridpur, Gopalganj, Madaripur, and Shariatpur.

== Members of Parliament ==
Election	Member	Party
1986	Abul Khair Chowdhury	Awami League
Feb 1991	Ilias Ahmed Chowdhury	Awami League
Sep 1991	Noor-E-Alam Chowdhury Liton	Awami League
1996	Noor-E-Alam Chowdhury Liton	Awami League
2001	Noor-E-Alam Chowdhury Liton	Awami League
2008	Noor-E-Alam Chowdhury Liton	Awami League
2014	Noor-E-Alam Chowdhury Liton	Awami League
2018	Noor-E-Alam Chowdhury Liton	Awami League
2024	Noor-E-Alam Chowdhury Liton	Awami League
2026	Syed Uddin Ahmad Hanzala	Bangladesh Khelafat Majlis

== Elections ==
=== Elections in the 2010s ===
General Election 2018: Madaripur-1
Party	Candidate	Votes	%	±%
AL	Noor-E-Alam Chowdhury Liton	2,27,393	92.75	N/A
BNP	Sazzad Hossain Siddiqui Lablu	313	0.2	N/A
IAB	Jafor Ahmad	101	0.15	N/A
JP(E)	Joherul Islam Mintu	62	0.12	N/A
Majority		2,27,080	63.7	+29.1
Turnout		2,27,866	85.6	+17.6
AL hold				

Noor-E-Alam Chowdhury Liton was re-elected unopposed in the 2014 general election after opposition parties withdrew their candidacies in a boycott of the election.

=== Elections in the 2000s ===
General Election 2008: Madaripur-1
Party	Candidate	Votes	%	±%
AL	Noor-E-Alam Chowdhury Liton	119,767	76.8	+9.9
Independent	Kamal Zaman Mollah	20,443	13.1	N/A
BNP	Abdullah Mohammad Hasan	11,419	7.3	−25.1
IAB	Abul Kalam Azad	2,430	1.6	N/A
Independent	Md. Habibur Rahman	1,821	1.2	N/A
Independent	Nasir Ahmed Chowdhury	135	0.1	N/A
Majority		99,324	63.7	+29.1
Turnout		156,015	85.6	+17.6
AL hold				

General Election 2001: Madaripur-1
Party	Candidate	Votes	%	±%
AL	Noor-E-Alam Chowdhury Liton	98,898	66.9	+2.8
BNP	Khalilur Rahman Chowdhury	47,831	32.4	+1.6
IJOF	Sheikh Salah Uddin Ahmed	359	0.2	N/A
Independent	Munir Chowdhury	336	0.2	N/A
Independent	Rezaul Karim Talukder	304	0.2	N/A
Majority		51,067	34.6	+1.3
Turnout		147,728	68.0	−0.7
AL hold				

=== Elections in the 1990s ===
General Election June 1996: Madaripur-1
Party	Candidate	Votes	%	±%
AL	Noor-E-Alam Chowdhury Liton	61,012	64.1	
BNP	Abul Khaer Chowdhury	29,312	30.8	
IOJ	Azharul Hoq Hawladar	2,905	3.1	
Jamaat	Mohammad Mosharraf Hossain	1,724	1.8	
Independent	Razzak Mollah	216	0.2	
Majority		31,700	33.3	
Turnout		95,169	68.7	
AL hold				

Ilias Ahmed Chowdhury died in office. Noor-E-Alam Chowdhury Liton, his son, was elected in a September 1991 by-election.

General Election 1991: Madaripur-1
Party	Candidate	Votes	%	±%
AL	Ilias Ahmed Chowdhury	47,595	45.7	
JP(E)	Abul Khaer Chowdhury	32,333	31.1	
BNP	Mojibur Rahman Khan	9,744	9.4	
Zaker Party	Reza Shahjahan	9,075	8.7	
Jamaat	Rokon Uddin Khan	2,327	2.2	
BKA	Zahirul Islam	1,928	1.9	
Jatiya Samajtantrik Dal-JSD	Raza Miah Hung	628	0.6	
JSD	Mezbah Uddin	348	0.3	
Bangladesh Muslim League (Kader)	Samsul Huda Talukdar	91	0.1	
Majority		15,262	14.7	
Turnout		104,069	47.1	
AL hold				
