= Sharfuzzaman Jahangir =

Bangladeshi politician

F.E. Sharfuzzaman Jahangir

Member of Bangladesh Parliament
- In office 15 February 1996 – 12 June 1996
- Preceded by: Kazi Abdur Rashid
- Succeeded by: Faruk Khan

Personal details
- Political party: Bangladesh Nationalist Party

F.E. Sharfuzzaman Jahangir (Bengali: এফ.ই. শরফুজ্জামান জাহাঙ্গীর) is a Bangladesh Nationalist Party politician and a former member of parliament for Gopalganj-1.

== Career ==
Jahangir was elected to parliament from Gopalganj-1 as a Bangladesh Nationalist Party candidate on 15 February 1996.

In 2018, Jahangir was nominated for the 11th Jatiya Sangshad elections from Gopalganj-1. His nomination was opposed by supporters of Mahbubur Rahman who vandalized the Bangladesh Nationalist Party office in Gulshan.
