= Sardar AKM Nasiruddin =

Bangladeshi politician

Member of Bangladesh Parliament

Personal details
- Party: Bangladesh Nationalist Party

Sardar AKM Nasiruddin is a Bangladesh Nationalist Party politician and a former member of parliament for Faridpur-14 and Shariatpur-1.

== Career ==
Nasiruddin was elected to parliament from Faridpur-14 as a Bangladesh Nationalist Party candidate in 1979. He was elected to parliament from Shariatpur-1 as a Jatiya Party candidate in 1986 and 1988.
