= Midland Bank (Bangladesh) =

Bank of Bangladesh

Midland Bank PLC.
- Type: Public limited company
- Industry: Banking
- Founded: 2013
- Headquarters: Dhaka, Bangladesh
- Area served: Bangladesh
- Key people: Ahsan Khan Chowdhury (Chairman); Imtiaz U. Ahmed (MD & CEO)
- Services: Banking; Financial services
- Website: www.midlandbankbd.net

Midland Bank PLC. is a fourth generation private commercial bank in Bangladesh. Ahsan Khan Chowdhury is chairman of the bank. Imtiaz U. Ahmed is the managing director and CEO of Midland Bank PLC.

== History ==
Midland Bank Limited was established on 20 March 2013. It was one of nine 4th generation bank approved all of whom have strong ties with Awami League, the government party. Bangladesh Bank approved Midland Bank Limited on the condition that the bank would eventually list on the stock market.

Md Ahsan-uz Zaman joined Midland Bank Limited in July 2014 as its chief executive officer and managing director.

In 2018, defaulted loans of Midland Bank Limited rose from 220 million taka to 650 million taka.

In July 2020, Md Ahsan-uz Zaman reappointed Midland Bank Limited's Chief Executive Officer and Managing Director On 20 June 2021, Bangladesh Bank included Midland Bank Limited in its Interoperable Digital Transaction Platform and Bangladesh Electronic Funds Transfer Network. In 2020 Midland Bank had 45.06 billion taka in deposits and 37.86 billion in loans. In September 2021, Nilufer Zafarullah was elected chairman of Midland Bank Limited and Md Shamsuzzaman was elected vice-chairman. It launched Midland Online in an attempt to provide more online services during the COVID-19 pandemic in Bangladesh. The bank made 1.62 billion taka in operating profit in 2021 and an increase from 1.25 billion taka it made in 2020.

Midland Bank distributed loans worth 45 million taka to Jamdani weavers in Narayanganj in collaboration with the USHA Foundation.

Bangladesh Securities and Exchange Commission asked Midland Bank Limited to list on the stock market. In June 2020, the Midland Bank Limited announced plans to list on the Dhaka Stock Exchange through Initial Public Offering and raise 7 billion taka from the capital market. The Dhaka Tribune reported that Anwar Ispat embezzled 500 million taka from the Gulshan branch of the bank which was denied by the bank.

== Board of directors ==
Sl #	Name	Designation	Reference
1	Ahsan Khan Chowdhury	Chairman	
2	Md. Shamsuzzaman	Vice Chairman	
3	Master Abul Kashem	Director	
4	Rezaul Karim	Director	
5	A.K.M. Badiul Alam	Director	
6	Hafizur Rahman Sarker	Director	
7	Dr. Mostafizur Rahman	Director	
8	Shahnaj Parveen	Director	
9	Mohammed Jamal Ullah	Director	
10	Alhaj Mohammad Helal Miah	Director	
11	Md. Kamal Hossain	Director	
12	Riaz Ahmed Choudhury	Independent Director	
13	Imtiaz U. Ahmed	Managing Director & CEO	
