= Ganesh Chandra Haldar =

Bangladeshi politician

Ganesh Chandra Halder

Member of Bangladesh Parliament
- In office February 1996 – June 2001
- Preceded by: Syed Abul Hossain
- Succeeded by: Syed Abul Hossain

Personal details
- Died: November 29, 2022 London, UK
- Party: Bangladesh Nationalist Party

Ganesh Chandra Halder was a Bangladesh Nationalist Party politician and a member of parliament for Madaripur-3.

== Biography ==
Haldar was elected to parliament from Madaripur-3 as a Bangladesh Nationalist Party candidate in February 1996.

He died on 29 November 2022 in London.
