= Mosharraf Hossain (lawyer) =

Bangladeshi politician

- মোশাররফ হোসেন

Member of Parliament for Faridpur-4
- In office 1991 – 15 February 1996
- Preceded by: Mohammad Azharul Haque
- Succeeded by: Chowdhury Akmal Ibne Yusuf
- In office 12 June 1996 – 1999
- Preceded by: Chowdhury Akmal Ibne Yusuf
- Succeeded by: Saleha Mosharraf

Personal details
- Died: 19 August 1999
- Party: Bangladesh Awami League
- Spouse: Saleha Mosharraf

Mosharraf Hossain (died 19 August 1999) was a Bangladesh Awami League politician who served as a Jatiya Sangsad member representing the Faridpur-4 constituency.

== Career ==
Hossain was a veteran of the Bengali Language movement. He fought in the Bangladesh Liberation war. He was elected to parliament from Faridpur-4 as a Bangladesh Awami League candidate in 1991 and won again in 1996.

== Death ==
Hossain died on 19 August 1999. He was succeeded by his wife, Saleha Mosharraf, in his constituency.
