= B. M. Muzammel Haque =

Bangladeshi politician

Member of Parliament
- In office 29 December 2008 – 30 December 2018
- Preceded by: K.M. Hemayet Ullah Auranga
- Succeeded by: Iqbal Hossain Apu

Personal details
- Born: 1 July 1957 (age 68)
- Political party: Awami League

B. M. Muzammel Haque (Bengali: বি,এম, মোজাম্মেল হক) is a Bangladeshi Politician and Former Member of Parliament from Shariatpur-1 Constituency. Currently he is Organising Secretary of Bangladesh Awami League Central Executive committee

== Early life ==
Haque was born on 1 July 1957. He completed a master's degree.

== Career ==
In 2008, Haque was selected to be the Awami League candidate for the parliamentary seat of Shariatpur-1. He was elected at the 2008 general election, gaining 64% of the vote, and retained the seat in 2014. At the Awami League's triennial council session in 2009, he was named as an organising secretary of the party's Central Working Committee, and continued in the post after the 2012, 2016, and 2019 councils. In April 2014, he was investigated by the Anti-Corruption Commission (ACC) for allegedly misappropriating government funds. He expressed confidence that the ACC would find the allegations baseless. Haque sought renomination by the Awami League to contest the 2018 general election, but was unsuccessful. He faced opposition from what the Dhaka Tribune characterized as "a significantly large" number of local party leaders. Awami League General Secretary Obaidul Quader explained Haque not being nominated by saying that the Prime Minister had other important election duties for him to perform.

Haque was detained by Detective Branch in October 2025.
