= Iqbal Hossain Apu =

Bangladeshi politician

- ইকবাল হোসেন অপু

Member of the Bangladesh Parliament for Shariatpur-1
- In office 30 January 2019 – 6 August 2024
- Preceded by: B.M Muzammel Haque
- Succeeded by: Sayeed Ahmed Aslam

Personal details
- Born: 2 February 1966 (age 60)
- Party: Bangladesh Awami League

Iqbal Hossain Apu (born 2 February 1966) is a member of the Bangladesh Awami League's central Executive committee and is the former member of parliament from Shariatpur-1. He was vice chairman for board of trustees in Atish Dipankar University of Science and Technology.
