= Shariatpur-1 =

Constituency of Bangladesh's Jatiya Sangsad

Coordinates: 23.21°N 90.35°E

- Constituency for the Jatiya Sangsad
- District: Shariatpur District
- Division: Dhaka Division
- Electorate: 296,018 (2018)

Current constituency
- Created: 1984
- Party: Bangladesh Nationalist Party
- Member: Sayeed Ahmed Aslam
- Created from: Faridpur-14
- ← 220 Madaripur-3 222 Shariatpur-2 →

Shariatpur-1 is a constituency represented in the Jatiya Sangsad (National Parliament) of Bangladesh since 2026 by Sayeed Ahmed Aslam of the Bangladesh Nationalist Party.

== Boundaries ==
The constituency encompasses Shariatpur Sadar and Zanjira upazilas.

== History ==
The constituency was created in 1984 from the Faridpur-14 constituency when the former Faridpur District was split into five districts: Rajbari, Faridpur, Gopalganj, Madaripur, and Shariatpur.

== Members of Parliament ==
Election	Member	Party
1986	Sardar AKM Nasiruddin	Independent
1991	K.M. Hemayet Ullah Auranga	Awami League
Sep 1996 by-election	Master Majibur Rahman	Awami League
2001	K.M. Hemayet Ullah Auranga	Independent
2008	B. M. Muzammel Haque	Awami League
2018	Iqbal Hossain Apu	Awami League
2026	Sayeed Ahmed Aslam	Bangladesh Nationalist Party

== Elections ==
=== Elections in the 2010s ===
B. M. Muzammel Haque was re-elected unopposed in the 2014 general election after opposition parties withdrew their candidacies in a boycott of the election.

=== Elections in the 2000s ===
General Election 2008: Shariatpur-1
Party	Candidate	Votes	%	±%
AL	B. M. Muzammel Haque	117,386	64.1	+19.1
Independent	Mobarak Ali Sikdur	56,853	31.0	N/A
BNP	Shahidul Haq Sikder	6,558	3.6	+3.2
Zaker Party	Molla Gias Uddin Ahammed	2,467	1.3	N/A
Majority		60,533	33.0	+23.9
Turnout		183,264	84.8	+15.6
AL gain from Independent				

General Election 2001: Shariatpur-1
Party	Candidate	Votes	%	±%
Independent	K.M. Hemayet Ullah Auranga	98,480	54.1	
AL	Mobarak Ali Sikder	81,930	45.0	
BNP	Altaf Hossain Sikder	779	0.4	
Independent	Md. Fazlul Haq Akand	258	0.1	
IJOF	Md. Jafar Khan	218	0.1	
Independent	A. Sattar	129	0.1	
Independent	Tanai Molla	81	0.0	
Bangladesh Muslim League (Jamir Ali)	Md. Anowar Hossain Aburi	67	0.0	
JSD	Atahar Hawlader	61	0.0	
Majority		16,550	9.1	
Turnout		182,003	69.2	
Independent gain from AL				

=== Elections in the 1990s ===
Abdur Razzak stood for two seats in the June 1996 general election, and won both of them: Shariatpur-1 and Shariatpur-3. He chose to represent Shariatpur-3 and quit Shariatpur-1, triggering a by-election. Master Majibur Rahman, of the Awami League, was elected in a September 1996 by-election.

General Election June 1996: Shariatpur-1
Party	Candidate	Votes	%	±%
AL	Abdur Razzaq	68,937	53.0	+5.2
BNP	Md. Amzad Hossain	32,266	24.8	−0.3
Independent	Tanai Molla	17,764	13.6	N/A
Jamaat	Md. Saiful Alam Khan	4,953	3.8	−4.2
IOJ	Md. Sirajul Haque Akon	2,927	2.3	N/A
Zaker Party	Md. Siddiqur Rahman	1,660	1.3	+0.3
JP(E)	Gias Uddin	938	0.7	N/A
Independent	S.M. Shah Alam Salim	197	0.2	N/A
Social Democratic Party	A. Aziz Bepari	181	0.1	N/A
Gano Forum	Abdur Rahman Madbar	166	0.1	N/A
Jatiya Samajtantrik Dal-JSD	Samsul Haque Bepari	120	0.1	N/A
Independent	Altab Hossain Sikdar	85	0.1	N/A
Majority		36,671	28.2	+5.6
Turnout		130,194	73.7	+25.9
AL hold				

General Election 1991: Shariatpur-1
Party	Candidate	Votes	%	±%
AL	K.M. Hemayet Ullah Auranga	54,953	47.8	
BNP	Sardar AKM Nasiruddin	28,895	25.1	
BAKSAL	Md. Mojibor Rahman	18,754	16.3	
Jamaat	Khalilur Rahman	9,225	8.0	
Zaker Party	Gias Uddin Molla	1,133	1.0	
BKA	Alauddin	904	0.8	
Independent	Nur Mohammad Kotoal	352	0.3	
Independent	Md. Samsul Haque Bepari	349	0.3	
Bangladesh Muslim League (Kader)	A. Aziz Hawladar	258	0.2	
Independent	Amzad Hossein Morol	235	0.2	
Majority		26,058	22.6	
Turnout		115,058	47.8	
AL gain from Independent				
