= Mujibur Rahman (scientist) =

Bangladeshi medical scientist

- Died: 29 June 2015 (aged 96); Dhaka, Bangladesh
- Education: Ph.D.
- Alma mater: Gauhati Medical College; University of Glasgow
- Occupation: Medical scientist

Mujibur Rahman (died 29 June 2015) was a Bangladeshi medical scientist. He established the first blood transfusion center at the Institute of Post Graduate Medicine and Research (now Bangabandhu Sheikh Mujib Medical University). He was awarded Ekushey Padak in 2014 by the Government of Bangladesh for his contribution to social service.

== Education and career ==
After passing the matriculation examination from Sylhet Zilla School, Rahman went to Berry-White School of Medicine in Guwahati (later renamed to Gauhati Medical College and Hospital) in Assam to study medicine for four years. He returned to East Pakistan in 1952 and worked for three years at Sir Salimullah Medical College. In 1964, he graduated from University of Glasgow and obtained the first Ph.D. in hematology and blood transfusion from South and Southeast Asia.

After returning from Glasgow, Rahman served as the blood transfusion officer at Dhaka Medical College and Hospital. In 1982, he retired from government services. He set up 30 blood transfusion centres during his time in public service. He became an honorary member of the World Health Organization's expert advisory panel on human blood products from 1979 to 2002 as an international expert. He set up the Blood Transfusion Society in Bangladesh and acted as its president.

Rahman wrote six books. He published research articles that include discovering blood grouping antisera and enzymes Bromelain from Bangladeshi pineapples for detection of irregular antibodies from fruits to detect A1 red cells.

Rahman discovered one of the rarest blood groups, the Bombay blood type, in the world from two Bangladeshi families.
