= Mujibur Rahman (officer, born 1953) =

Bangladeshi army officer

- Born: 1953; Maijdee, East Bengal, Pakistan
- Died: 23 September 1981 (aged 28); Rajshahi Central Jail, Rajshahi, Bangladesh
- Burial place: Noakhali, Chittagong
- Military career
- Allegiance: Bangladesh
- Branch: Bangladesh Army
- Service years: 1975–1981
- Rank: Major
- Unit: East Bengal Regiment
- Commands: Sub-Commander of Sector – II
- Known for: Assassination of Ziaur Rahman
- Conflicts: Bangladesh Liberation War

Mujibur Rahman (1953 – 23 September 1981) was a Bangladeshi army officer who was executed for his alleged role in the assassination of President Ziaur Rahman.

== Career ==
=== Bangladesh Liberation War ===
Mujibur Rahman was born in Maijdi, Noakhali, in 1953. In 1970 Mujib was recruited as an airman in the Pakistan Air Force and was stationed in West Pakistan. When the Bangladesh Liberation War began, Mujibur who was in Karachi, fled to Bangladesh and fought in sector 2.

After the war, Mujibur joined the Bangladesh Military Academy in Comilla and was commissioned on 11 January 1975. During the first week of May 1981, Mujibur was promoted from captain to major.

=== Assassination of Ziaur Rahman ===
While Mujibur's role in the assassination of Ziaur Rahman isn't clear, Anthony Mascarenhas claims that on 29 May 1981, Mujibur received a copy of the accommodation arrangements of the Circuit House, where Zia was staying. This was provided to Mujibur by Lt. Colonel Mafuzur, who was also executed.

== Death ==
Mujibur was hanged on 23 September 1981, in Rajshahi Central Jail. His only child was born on 28 August 1981, but died 10 days later. In his last letter to his wife, he wrote

Lakshmi (Darling),

Take my love, first. But it will not be the last time; whenever you will remember me, you will find me. This, probably, is my last letter. Read the earlier ones, too. Do you remember after our engagement you gave me a poem of Tagore. Today I give you, end.

Mujib
