= Mujibur Rahman Dilu =

Bangladeshi actor (1952–2021)

- মজিবুর রহমান দিলু
- Died: 19 January 2021 (aged 69); Dhaka, Bangladesh
- Occupations: Actor, director, playwright

Mujibur Rahman Dilu (1952 – 19 January 2021) was a Bangladeshi television and stage actor, director, theater activist and playwright. He was most notable for acting in the television drama serial Songsoptok.

== Career ==
In 1976, Dilu directed and acted in the play Kingsuk Je Morute. It was selected in the first Drama festival of Bangladesh. He owned the theater troupe Dhaka Drama.

Dilu took part in the Liberation War of Bangladesh in 1971.

Dilu was a coordinator of Tonatuni, a children's organisation.

== Personal life ==
Dilu was married to Rani Rahman.

=== Health ===
In June 2005, Dilu was diagnosed with Guillain–Barré syndrome. Government of Bangladesh donated Tk 1 lakh from the Prime Minister's Fund for his treatment.

== Works ==
- Jonotar Rangoshala (an adaptation of Bertolt Brecht's The Threepenny Opera)
- Aami Gadha Bolchhi
- Nana Ronger Dinguli
