= Kazi Zafarullah =

Bangladeshi politician

- Born: April 1947 (age 79)
- Education: Dhaka College
- Occupations: Industrialist and politician
- Spouse: Nilufer Zafar
- Relatives: Kazi Shahidullah (brother)

Kazi Zafarullah (born April 1947) is a Bangladeshi industrialist and politician. He is a presidium member of the Bangladesh Awami League. He was a member of parliament for Faridpur-5.

== Early life ==
Zafarullah was born in April 1947, the eldest son of Kazi Mahbubullah and Begum Zebunnessa. He was educated at St. Gregory's High School and Dhaka College, and has bachelor's and master's degrees in history from the University of Dhaka.

== Career ==
Zafarullah was critically injured in the 2004 Dhaka grenade attack, which targeted former Prime Minister Sheikh Hasina.

In 2005, Zafarullah attended a meeting between Sheikh Hasina and the British High Commissioner to Bangladesh, Anwar Choudhury.

Zafarullah hosted a dinner for Pinak Ranjan Chakravarty, the newly appointed high commissioner of India to Bangladesh, attended by diplomats and Awami League leaders, on 1 February 2007. On 10 April, he criticized a case being filed against former Prime Minister Sheikh Hasina and called it a conspiracy. The joint forces arrested him in front of his home in Gulshan Thana on 18 April 2007 on three cases. He was sent to jail on 20 April. He was freed on bail on 11 December but was arrested again under state of emergency powers as he was leaving the gate of the jail. On 16 January 2008, he received bail and was released from jail, according to Deputy Inspector General (Prisons) Major Shamsul Haider Siddiqui. On 25 January, he was indicted in an extortion case filed by Gazi Golam Dastagir. Mohammad Noor Ali of Unique Group alleged he gave Sajeeb Wajed Joy, son of former Prime Minister Sheikh Hasina, half a floor at the UTC building located on Panthapath and registered under Zafarullah's name as commission on the MiG-29 purchase deal.

The Anti-Corruption Commission pressed charges against Zafarullah in September 2008 for having 152.3 million taka beyond his known source of income and for hiding 70 million taka in his wealth statement submitted to the commission. He was also charged with laundering 70 million taka.

On 11 February 2009, the Anti-Corruption Commission cleared Zafarullah, his wife, and two sons on corruption charges.

In 2013, it was reported that Zafarullah and his wife and other family members had created a network of offshore companies in the British Virgin Islands from 2006 to 2008. In 2014, he lost his seat as an MP to an independent candidate, Nixon Chowdhury. Chowdhury, who is related to Prime Minister Sheikh Hasina, received 98,300 votes, while Zafarullah received 72,248 votes. Sheikh Hasina did not give the nomination to Nixon, as he was an accused in the Padma Bridge graft scandal, an accusation that he denied.

Zafarullah was nominated by the Awami League to contest the 2018 election from Faridpur-4, and Prime Minister Sheikh Hasina campaigned for him. He received 94,234 votes but lost the election to Nixon Chowdhury, who received 144,179 votes.

Zafarullah is a presidium (central executive committee) member of the Awami League. In August 2022, he was part of an Awami League delegation that met the Election Commission to discuss the upcoming national election.

After the fall of the Sheikh Hasina led Awami League government, Zafarullah was detained in September 2025 and shown arrested in a case related to the protests against former Prime Minister Sheikh Hasina. The Anti-Corruption Commission is seeking to freeze BDT 1.55 billion in bank accounts held by him and his family members.

== Personal life ==
His wife, Nilufer Zafar, is also a member of parliament and chairman of Midland Bank. Zafarullah and his wife were named in the 2016 Panama Papers leak. His younger brother, Kazi Ekramullah, was a director of Midland Bank and an industrialist.
