= Madaripur-3 =

Constituency of Bangladesh's Jatiya Sangsad

Coordinates: 23.07°N 90.23°E

- Constituency for the Jatiya Sangsad
- District: Madaripur District
- Division: Dhaka Division
- Electorate: 297,955 (2018)

Current constituency
- Created: 1984
- Party: Bangladesh Nationalist Party
- Member: Anisur Rahaman
- ← 219 Madaripur-2 221 Shariatpur-1 →

Madaripur-3 is a constituency represented in the Jatiya Sangsad (National Parliament) of Bangladesh since 2026 by Anisur Rahaman of the Bangladesh Nationalist Party.

== Boundaries ==
The constituency encompasses Kalkini Upazila and Dasar Upazila five union parishads of Madaripur Sadar Upazila: Ghatmajhi, Jhaudi, Kendua, Khoajpur, and Mustafapur.

== History ==
The constituency was created in 1984 from a Faridpur constituency when the former Faridpur District was split into five districts: Rajbari, Faridpur, Gopalganj, Madaripur, and Shariatpur.

== Members of Parliament ==
Election	Member	Party
1986	Sheikh Shahidul Islam	Jatiya Party
1991	Syed Abul Hossain	Awami League
Feb 1996	Ganesh Chandra Haldar	Bangladesh Nationalist Party
Jun 1996	Syed Abul Hossain	Awami League
2014	AFM Bahauddin Nasim	Awami League
2018	Abdus Sobhan Golap	Awami League
2026	Anisur Rahaman	Bangladesh Nationalist Party

== Elections ==
=== Elections in the 2020s ===
General election 2026: Madaripur-3
Party	Candidate	Votes	%	±%
BNP	Anisur Rahman			
Jamaat	Md Rafikul Islam			
BSP	Nitai Chakrabarty			
IAB	Md Azizul Haque			
BSD	Aminul Islam			
Majority				
Turnout				
BNP gain from AL				

=== Elections in the 2010s ===
AFM Bahauddin Nasim was elected unopposed in the 2014 general election after opposition parties withdrew their candidacies in a boycott of the election.

=== Elections in the 2000s ===
General Election 2008: Madaripur-3
Party	Candidate	Votes	%	±%
AL	Syed Abul Hossain	129,638	68.9	+4.3
BNP	Md. Habibur Rahman	48,319	25.7	N/A
IAB	Syed Belayet Hossain	6,642	3.5	N/A
Independent	Shahidul Islam Hawlader	3,048	1.6	N/A
Independent	Tasmin Rana	518	0.3	N/A
Majority		81,319	43.2	0.0
Turnout		188,165	84.0	+14.0
AL hold				

General Election 2001: Madaripur-3
Party	Candidate	Votes	%	±%
AL	Syed Abul Hossain	110,993	64.6	+6.0
Independent	Habibur Rahman Azad	36,788	21.4	N/A
Jamaat	Fariduddin Ahmad	18,245	10.6	+3.0
IJOF	Syed Belayet Hossain	5,200	3.0	N/A
Independent	Kazi Emdadul Haq	373	0.2	N/A
Independent	Md. Sayem Talukder	175	0.1	N/A
Independent	Md. Moniruzzaman	172	0.1	N/A
Majority		74,205	43.2	+3.9
Turnout		171,946	70.1	−0.1
AL hold				

=== Elections in the 1990s ===
General Election June 1996: Madaripur-3
Party	Candidate	Votes	%	±%
AL	Syed Abul Hossain	71,922	58.6	+4.4
BNP	Khandakar Mashukur Rahman	23,720	19.3	−4.8
JP(E)	Sheikh Shahidul Islam	12,121	9.9	+9.3
Jamaat	Farid Uddin Khan	9,317	7.6	−8.9
IOJ	Sayed Belayet Hossain	4,843	3.9	N/A
Bangladesh Hindu League	Khokon Munshi	400	0.3	N/A
Bangladesh Muslim League (Jamir Ali)	Md. Alauddin Hawladar	346	0.3	N/A
Majority		48,202	39.3	+9.2
Turnout		122,669	70.2	+21.7
AL hold				

General Election 1991: Madaripur-3
Party	Candidate	Votes	%	±%
AL	Syed Abul Hossain	60,660	54.2	
BNP	A. Matin Molla	27,022	24.1	
Jamaat	Farid Uddin	18,424	16.5	
Zaker Party	Md. Shikbul Hossein	3,668	3.3	
Jatiya Biplobi Front	Emdad Hossein	918	0.8	
JP(E)	A. Latif Jonaki	720	0.6	
Bangladesh Muslim League (Kader)	A. K. M. Jahangir	481	0.4	
Majority		33,638	30.1	
Turnout		111,893	48.5	
AL gain from JP(E)				
