= Abdus Sobhan Golap =

Bangladesh Awami League politician and Member of Parliament

- আবদুস সোবহান গোলাপ

Member of the Bangladesh Parliament for Madaripur-3
- In office 30 January 2019 – 30 January 2024
- Preceded by: AFM Bahauddin Nasim
- Succeeded by: Mst. Tahmina Begum

Personal details
- Born: 11 October 1956 (age 69) Madaripur, East Pakistan, Pakistan
- Party: Bangladesh Awami League
- Education: M.S.S, M.Sc, Ph.D
- Alma mater: University of Dhaka; Norwegian University of Science and Technology; American World University

Abdus Sobhan Golap (born 11 October 1956) is a politician and a former Jatiya Sangsad member representing the Madaripur-3 constituency. As of 2019, he was the publicity and publications secretary of the Bangladesh Awami League.

== Early life ==
Golap was born on 11 October 1956 at North Ramjanpur village in Kalkini Upazila, Madaripur District of Bangladesh to Taiyab Ali Mia and Anaran Nesa. He completed his secondary education from Torky Bandor Victory High School and higher secondary from Dhaka College. He obtained his undergraduate degree in social science from Dhaka University.

In 1983, Golap was admitted to Norwegian University of Science and Technology at Trondheim and obtained his masters' from there. Later, he got his PhD from American World University on the topic of "Digital Bangladesh and Social Changes". The American World University is an uncredited university.

== Career ==
Golap got involved with Bangladesh Chhatra League politics when he was a student of the University of Dhaka.

Golap accompanied Sheikh Hasina when she went to the United States on 15 March 2007.

When Awami League formed the government after winning the 9th Bangladeshi parliamentary election in 2008, Golap was appointed personal secretary to Prime Minister Sheikh Hasina. In 2014, he was made special assistant to the prime minister. He has been the Awami League's office secretary since 2016.

Golap was elected a member of the parliament from Madaripur-3 constituency in the 11th Bangladeshi parliamentary election held on 30 December 2018.

Golap was arrested from the Nakhalpara area of Dhaka on 25 August 2024 in a case filed over the killing of apparel worker Rubel at the 2024 Bangladesh quota reform movement.

== Corruption ==
The Organized Crime and Corruption Reporting Project in a report has provided credible evidence of corruption against Abdus Sobhan. He acquired at least nine properties in the United States but did not mention about them in his electoral records before the 2018 Bangladesh election. His tax files and other relevant income records also do not have any mention of his properties in New York which indicates foul play in attaining these properties. According to an estimate, the value of these properties are around US$4 million. He acquired these properties while he was serving as an assistant to Prime Minister Sheikh Hasina.
