= Mujibur and Sirajul =

Bangladesh television personalities

Mujibur Rahman and Sirajul Islam are clerks in a New York City who made guest appearances on the Late Show with David Letterman.

Natives of Bangladesh, Mujibur Rahman and Sirajul Islam immigrated to New York and became employees at K&L's Rock America, a souvenir shop near the Ed Sullivan Theater, where the Late Show was produced. David Letterman frequently featured comedy spots with the clerks, and sent them across the United States as roving correspondents for the show in 1994. The duo toured many U.S. towns and cities and were greeted as celebrities. Siraj threw the opening pitch in a home game for the Sioux City Explorers. The two were also sent to Super Bowl XXIX to tape spots for the Late Show.

Mujib appeared as himself in the episode "The Documentary" of the 1995 situation comedy Double Rush. Mujib and Siraj guest-starred as themselves on an episode of the Cartoon Network Adult Swim show Space Ghost Coast to Coast, in which they ate pizza intended for Space Ghost, Zorak, and Moltar.

In 2003, when K&L's Rock America closed due to a rent increase, Letterman told the duo he would miss them and gave them each a dozen roses and a new vacuum cleaner as parting gifts.

== See also ==
- List of David Letterman sketch participants
