= Mujibur Rahman (Dinajpur politician) =

Bangladesh Nationalist Party politician

- মজিবর রহমান

Member of Parliament from Dinajpur-2
- In office 15 February 1996 – 12 June 1996
- Preceded by: Satish Chandra Roy
- Succeeded by: Satish Chandra Roy

Personal details
- Born: Dinajpur District
- Party: Bangladesh Nationalist Party

Mujibur Rahman is a Bangladesh Nationalist Party politician. He was elected a member of parliament from Dinajpur-2 in February 1996.

== Career ==
Mujibur was elected to parliament from Dinajpur-2 as a Bangladesh Nationalist Party candidate in 15 February 1996 Bangladeshi general election.
