= Sheikh Shahidul Islam =

Bangladeshi politician

Minister of Education
- In office January 1989 – January 1990
- Prime Minister: Moudud Ahmed; Kazi Zafar Ahmed
- Preceded by: Anisul Islam Mahmud
- Succeeded by: Kazi Zafar Ahmed

Personal details
- Party: Jatiya Party (Manju)
- Relatives: Sheikh family of Tungipara

Sheikh Shahidul Islam is a Bangladeshi politician who was elected to parliament for Madaripur-3 as a Jatiya Party candidate in 1986 and 1988, and served as a minister for Education, Public Works, Youth and Sports from 1985 to 1990. He is the current secretary general of the Jatiya Party (Manju).

== Early life ==
Islam was born on 29 September 1948 to the Sheikh family of Tungipara in Gopalganj, Faridpur district, East Bengal. Through his parents, Sheikh Mohammad Musa and Sheikh Zinnatunnesa, Sheikh Mujibur Rahman is his uncle and Begum Fazilatunnessa Mujib is his maternal aunt.

== Career ==
During the Bangladesh liberation war of 1971, Islam was trained in Dehradun and returned to Bangladesh to lead a platoon of Mujib Bahini. He was appointed as Chief of Greater Faridpur region.

In 1973, Islam was elected as the President of Bangladesh Chatra League. Following formation of Bakshal in 1975, he was nominated as the Secretary General of its students wing Jatiya Chhatra League.

Islam joined Jatiya Party in 1983 and was the founding President of its Youth wing Jatiyo Jubo Shanghati. In 1985, President Hussain Mohammad Ershad inducted him into the cabinet as deputy minister of Youth and Sports. In 1987, he was appointed as Minister of Public Works and in 1988, he was appointed as Minister of Education. During his period as Minister of Education, Islam was the first to introduce free education for women in Bangladesh. He also founded the Bangladesh National University and introduced private University concept in Bangladesh. In May 1990, He was appointed as Minister for Jute, a role he held till the cabinet was dissolved in December 1990.

Since 2008, Islam is the secretary general of the Jatiya Party fraction led by Anwar Hossain Manju.

Islam is a regular participant of different talk shows in different Bangladeshi TV channels. He is a regular contributor in Tritiyo Matra.

== Personal life ==
Islam's uncle was the first president of Bangladesh Bangabandhu Sheikh Mujibur Rahman. He is married to Yasmin. Yasmin was the daughter of Salehin, a former managing director of Janata Bank and brother of former chief advisor of the caretaker government Fakhruddin Ahmed.
