= Lutfar Rahman Farooq =

Bangladeshi politician

- লুৎফর রহমান ফারুক

Member of Parliament for Faridpur-5
- In office 7 May 1986 – 3 March 1988
- Preceded by: Chowdhury Kamal Ibne Yusuf
- Succeeded by: Akhteruzzaman Babul

Personal details
- Born: Lutfar Rahman Farooq Bhuiyan Faridpur
- Party: Bangladesh Awami League

Lutfar Rahman Farooq Bhuiyan is a politician from Faridpur District of Bangladesh. He was elected a member of parliament from Faridpur-5 in the 1986 Bangladeshi general election.

== Career ==
Lutfar Rahman Farooq was elected a member of parliament from Faridpur-5 constituency as a Bangladesh Awami League candidate in the 1986 Bangladeshi general election. He was the chairman of Bhanga Upazila.
