= Mujibur Rahman Khan (politician) =

Mujibur Rahman Khan was a journalist and Indian nationalist activist.

== Early life and education ==
Mujibur Rahman Khan was born in Nehalpur, Bashirhat, 24 Parganas.

== Career ==
Mujibur Rahman Khan began his involvement in journalism initially as a letter-writer to various newspapers and periodicals, notably to The Bengalee, led by Surendranath Banerjee. He later contributed to The Sudhakar and served as an editor for the weekly, Islam Rabi. In 1906, Rahman was appointed as the editor of the English weekly, The Mussalman, founded by barrister Abdur Rasul.

In 1936, Mujibur Rahman Khan was forced to leave the Mussalman, which was sympathetic to the Muslim League. In 1937, he established the periodical, The Comrade, with the help of fellow Indian nationalists.

== Death ==
Mujibur Rahman Khan died in October 1940, following years of paralysis.
