= Mujibur Rahman Devdas =

Bangladeshi activist (died 2020)

- Awards: Ekushey Padak

Mujibur Rahman Devdas (1929/1930 – 18 May 2020) was a Bangladeshi activist. He was awarded Ekushey Padak in 2015 by the Government of Bangladesh.

== Career ==
Devdas served as a faculty member at the Department of Mathematics, Rajshahi University.

He died on 17 May 2020, aged 90.
