= Abul Khair Chowdhury =

Bangladeshi politician

Member of Bangladesh Parliament
- In office 1986–1991
- Succeeded by: Ilias Ahmed Chowdhury

Personal details
- Political party: Bangladesh Awami League

Abul Khair Chowdhury was a Jatiya Party politician and a former member of parliament for Madaripur-1.

== Career ==
Chowdhury was elected to parliament from Madaripur-1 as a Jatiya Party candidate in 1986 and 1988.
