= Gopalganj-2 =

Constituency of Bangladesh's Jatiya Sangsad

Coordinates: 23.01°N 89.83°E

- Constituency for the Jatiya Sangsad
- District: Gopalganj District
- Division: Dhaka Division
- Electorate: 384,326 (2026)

Current constituency
- Created: 1984
- Party: Bangladesh Nationalist Party
- Member: K M Babar
- ← 215 Gopalganj-1 217 Gopalganj-3 →

Gopalganj-2 is a constituency represented in the Jatiya Sangsad (National Parliament) of Bangladesh since 2026 by K M Babar of the Bangladesh Nationalist Party.

== Boundaries ==
The constituency encompasses Gopalganj Sadar Upazila and seven union parishads of Kashiani Upazila: Bethuri, Fukura, Hatiara, Nijamkandi, Oraandi, Puisur, and Singa.

== History ==
The constituency was created in 1984 from a Faridpur constituency when the former Faridpur District was split into five districts: Rajbari, Faridpur, Gopalganj, Madaripur, and Shariatpur.

== Members of Parliament ==
Election	Member	Party
1986	Sheikh Fazlul Karim Selim	Awami League
1988	Farid Ahmed	
1991	Sheikh Fazlul Karim Selim	Awami League
Feb 1996	vacant	
Jun 1996	Sheikh Fazlul Karim Selim	Awami League
2026	K M Babar	Bangladesh Nationalist Party

== Elections ==
=== Elections in the 2020s ===
General Election 2026: Gopalganj-2
Party	Candidate	Votes	%	±%
BNP	K M Babar	40,048	26.9	N/A
Independent	M. H. Khan Manju	33,039	22.2	N/A
BKM	Shuaib Ibrahim	28,604	19.2	N/A
Independent	Kamruzzaman Bhuiyan	27,891	18.8	N/A
Independent	Utpal Biswas	8,665	5.8	N/A
IAB	Taslim Sikder	2,911	2.0	N/A
Independent	Md. Sirajul Islam Siraj	2,819	1.9	N/A
Independent	Sipon Bhuiyan	1,931	1.3	N/A
Zaker Party	Mahmud Hasan	1,371	0.9	N/A
JP(E)	Riaz Sarwar Molla	419	0.3	N/A
Independent	Rony Molla	403	0.3	N/A
GOP	Deen Mohammad	305	0.2	N/A
Gano Forum	Shah Mofiz	215	0.1	N/A
Majority		7,009	4.7	N/A
Turnout		148,621	38.7	N/A
BNP gain from AL				

=== Elections in the 2010s ===
General Election 2014: Gopalganj-2
Party	Candidate	Votes	%	±%
AL	Sheikh Fazlul Karim	237,591	98.3	+2.2
JP(E)	Kazi Shaheen	4,084	1.7	N/A
Majority		233,507	96.6	+4.5
Turnout		241,675	89.8	+8.7
AL hold				

=== Elections in the 2000s ===
General Election 2008: Gopalganj-2
Party	Candidate	Votes	%	±%
AL	Sheikh Fazlul Karim	186,574	96.1	+2.1
BNP	Md. Shirajul Islam Shiraj	7,643	3.9	−0.2
Majority		178,931	92.1	+2.2
Turnout		194,217	81.1	+0.9
AL hold				

General Election 2001: Gopalganj-2
Party	Candidate	Votes	%	±%
AL	Sheikh Fazlul Karim	185,821	94.0	+7.7
BNP	Sheikh Saifur Rahman Nantu	8,164	4.1	−1.8
Communist Kendra	Asit Baran Ray	1,042	0.5	N/A
IJOF	Sheikh Alamgir Hossain	915	0.5	N/A
JSD	Sahidul Huq	741	0.4	N/A
Gano Forum	Kazi Mezbah Uddin	678	0.3	0.0
Jatiya Party (M)	Md. Monirul Islam	50	0.0	N/A
Independent	S. M. Nuru Mia	44	0.0	N/A
Independent	S. M. Faruk Ahmed	29	0.0	N/A
Majority		177,657	89.9	+9.5
Turnout		197,579	80.2	+5.1
AL hold				

=== Elections in the 1990s ===
General Election June 1996: Gopalganj-2
Party	Candidate	Votes	%	±%
AL	Sheikh Fazlul Karim	115,032	86.3	+10.5
BNP	Sharufzzaman Jahangir	7,825	5.9	−2.0
JP(E)	Gazi Abdus Salam	3,975	3.0	+2.5
Jamaat	Md. Azmal Hussain	2,445	1.8	N/A
BKA	Md. Shahidul Alam Chowdhury	1,925	1.4	−4.6
Bhasani Front	Asit Baran Roy Khokon	539	0.4	N/A
Gano Forum	Abul Kashem	449	0.3	N/A
WPB	Sheikh Mohammad Ilias	375	0.3	0.0
Zaker Party	Md. Shahid Khan	338	0.3	−2.9
Independent	Hinandra Nath Biswas	164	0.1	N/A
Pragotishi Jatiatabadi Dal (Nurul A Moula)	Sheikh Alamgir Hossain	138	0.1	−0.4
Independent	Md. Moktar Hossain	70	0.1	N/A
Majority		107,207	80.4	+12.5
Turnout		133,275	75.1	+26.9
AL hold				

General Election 1991: Gopalganj-2
Party	Candidate	Votes	%	±%
AL	Sheikh Fazlul Karim	93,015	75.8	
BNP	Fazle Elahi Suruzzaman Miah	9,661	7.9	
BKA	Md. Nazrul Islam	7,342	6.0	
Bangladesh Hindu League	Shishir Bishwas	5,341	4.4	
Zaker Party	Dhirendra Kumar Bakchi	3,927	3.2	
CPB	Md. Abul Kashem	1,425	1.2	
Pragotishi Jatiatabadi Dal (Nurul A Moula)	Sheikh Alamgir Hossain	651	0.5	
JP(E)	Farooq	589	0.5	
WPB	Sheikh Mohammad Ilias	408	0.3	
Bangladesh National Hindu Party	Sandip Kumar Bishwas	372	0.3	
Majority		83,354	67.9	
Turnout		122,731	48.2	
AL gain from				
