= Sarwar Jan Chowdhury =

Bangladeshi diplomat and politician

- সরোয়ার জান চৌধুরী

Member of Bangladesh Parliament

Personal details
- Party: Jatiya Party (Ershad)

Sarwar Jan Chowdhury is a Jatiya Party (Ershad) Bangladeshi politician and a former member of parliament for Gopalganj-2.

== Career ==
Chowdhury was elected to parliament from Gopalganj-2 as a Jatiya Party candidate in 1986.
