= Farid Ahmed (politician) =

Bangladeshi politician

- ফরিদ আহমেদ

Member of Parliament for Gopalganj-2
- In office 15 April 1988 – 6 December 1990
- Preceded by: Sheikh Fazlul Karim
- Succeeded by: Sheikh Fazlul Karim

Personal details
- Political party: Independent

Farid Ahmed is an independent politician in Bangladesh and a former Jatiya Sangsad member representing the Gopalganj-2 constituency.

== Career ==
Ahmed was elected to parliament from Gopalganj-2 as an independent candidate in 1988.
