= Master Majibur Rahman =

Bangladeshi politician

Member of Bangladesh Parliament

Personal details
- Political party: Bangladesh Awami League

Master Majibur Rahman is a Bangladesh Awami League politician and a former member of parliament for Shariatpur-1.

== Career ==
Rahman was elected to parliament from Shariatpur-1 as a Bangladesh Awami League candidate in 1996 in an by-election. The by-election was called after Abdur Razzaq, who was elected from Shariatpur-1 and Shariatpur-3, resigned and choose to represent Shariatpur-3.
