= Mujibur Rahman Chowdhury =

Bangladeshi politician (born 1978)

- মুজিবুর রহমান চৌধুরী

Member of the Bangladesh Parliament for Faridpur-4
- In office 29 January 2014 – 6 August 2024
- Preceded by: Nilufer Zafarullah

Personal details
- Born: 3 March 1978 (age 48) Dhaka, Bangladesh
- Party: Bangladesh Awami League
- Spouse: Tarin Hossain (m. 2016)
- Children: 1
- Parent: Ilias Ahmed Chowdhury (father)
- Relatives: Sheikh family of Tungipara
- Profession: Politician and Businessmen.

Mujibur Rahman Chowdhury (popularly known as Nixon Chowdhury; born 3 March 1978) is a Bangladeshi politician and a former Member of Parliament representing the Faridpur-4 constituency.

== Early life ==
Chowdhury was born on 3 March 1978 in Dhaka, Bangladesh. He came from a Bengali Muslim family of Chowdhuries from the village of Duttapara in Shibchar, Madaripur District. His parents, Ilias Ahmed Chowdhury and Sheikh Feroza Begum, were cousins of Prime Minister Sheikh Hasina. His father was a politician and came from a zamindar family whilst his mother, Sheikh Feroza Begum, was a housewife. Chowdhury had Iraqi Arab ancestry through both of his grandmothers, who were direct descendants of the 17th-century Muslim preacher Sheikh Abdul Awal of Baghdad. Both of his grandmothers were also sisters of Sheikh Mujibur Rahman. His maternal grandfather, Sheikh Nurul Haque, was also from the Sheikh-Wazed family. His brother Noor-E-Alam Chowdhury is a member of parliament.

== Education ==
He studied up to SSC or grade ten.

== Career ==
Chowdhury has been elected as a member of parliament for the 2nd time in 2018 Bangladeshi general election from Faridpur-4 constituency. He beat Awami League candidate Kazi Zafarullah. Previously he was elected to Parliament for the first time from Faridpur-4 as an independent rebel candidate beating Awami League candidate and the then Member of Parliament from Faridpur-4, Nilufer Zafar Ullah. In 2020, Chowdhury was made a presidium member of Jubo League.

== Controversy ==
Chowdhury was criticised for his role in the Padma Bridge graft scandal. SNC-Lavalin admitted to bribing him in order to obtain contracts. He was questioned by the Anti-Corruption Commission regarding this case. Soon after the case emanated, Sheikh Hasina disavowed her nephew and campaigned for his opponent during the 2014 Bangladeshi general election.

Chowdhury reportedly threatened civil servants working in Faridpur-4. He reportedly also called the UNO of Charbhadrasan and verbally abused him. A complaint letter against Chowdhury, issued by the Cabinet Division, said that "MP Nixon Chowdhury had threatened and defamed the Faridpur district commissioner, upazila nirbahi officer (UNO), executive magistrates and the local administration on the day of the election, the day before, and the day after." He also defamed and threatened the DC of Faridpur in a political rally, calling him a 'razakar'. An audio clip of Nixon Chowdhury verbally abusing an executive went viral on social media, although he claimed it was fabricated. The Election Commission has filed a case against him for violating electoral code of conduct. Chowdhury's lawyers filed a petition with the High Court of Bangladesh seeking anticipatory bail. He was granted an anticipatory bail by on 21 October 2020.

== Personal life ==
Chowdhury's first wife died under suspicious circumstances. While his personal assistant claimed she "slipped and fell" from the rooftop of the couple's six story apartment building, an unnatural death case was filed with Gulshan police. An autopsy was never performed and her family took the body without an official autopsy. They had one daughter, Nazora Chowdhury.

He is currently married to Tareen Hossain, managing director of The Daily Ittefaq. She is the granddaughter of Tofazzal Hossain Manik Miah and daughter of Anwar Hossain Manju. They have a son together.
