= Faridpur Division =

Proposed administrative division of Bangladesh

Faridpur Division ফরিদপুর বিভাগ
- Proposed Division
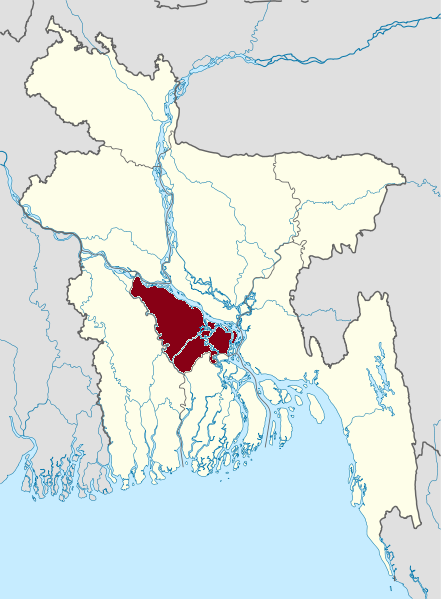
- Proposed Padma Division in Bangladesh
- Coordinates: Pe:GNS-enwiki 23.60°N 89.84°E
- Country: Bangladesh
- Capital: Faridpur

Area
  - Total: 6,913.44 km^{2} (2,669.29 sq mi)

Population
  - Total: 7,235,343
  - Density: 1,046.56/km^{2} (2,710.58/sq mi)
- Time zone: UTC+6 (BST)
- Districts: 5
- Upazilas: 30

Faridpur Division (Bengali: ফরিদপুর বিভাগ), is a proposed administrative division within Bangladesh for the southern parts of the existing Dhaka Division, comprising Faridpur, Gopalganj, Madaripur, Rajbari, and Shariatpur districts of Dhaka Division. The headquarters of the division is proposed to be in Faridpur. This division was proposed to be named after its affiliated river, Padma, but in 2024, the Public Administration Reform Commission decided to create this division as Faridpur Division.

== History ==
The proposed Faridpur division was once under Gangaridai and Vanga Kingdom of ancient Bengal with its capital at Kotalipara in present day Gopalganj district of Bangladesh. Later, it was ruled by local Hindu rajas and Muslim sultans until the Mughal conquest of Bengal in the 16th century, after which many nobles and merchants from North India settled in the area. In 1582 in the reign of Emperor Akbar, the province of Bengal was formed into 33 sarkars or financial sub-divisions, and Faridpur area appears to have been included within the sarkar of Muhammad Abud and was known as Fatehabad.

In 1765, the British took over the financial administration of Faridpur, together with the rest of Bengal. The greater portion of Faridpur was then comprised within Dhaka District. In 1811, Faridpur was separated from Dacca collectorate. The district was initially known as Fatehabad. Under British rule in 1860, the district was named as Faridpur after 12th-century Sufi saint, Shah Sheikh Fariduddin. In 1984, with the decentralization program of the Bangladesh government, Faridpur district was reorganized into five separate districts: Rajbari, Gopalgonj, Madaripur, Shariatpur and Faridpur.

On 6 May 2017, Minister of Local Government, Rural Development and Co-operatives Khandaker Mosharraf Hossain announced that the new division would be renamed as Padma Division after the Padma River, which flows northeast of the proposed division. The name "Padma" was controversial and many were opposed to the name, who demanded it be changed to "Faridpur". The proposal was postponed on 27 November 2022. On 17 December 2024, the Public Administration Reform Commission recommended the creation of the Cumilla and Faridpur divisions.

== Administrative districts ==
Proposed Divisions of Bangladesh by Public Administration Reform Commission

The division was proposed to be subdivided into five districts (zilas) and thence into 30 sub-districts (upazilas).

| Name | Capital | Area (km^{2}) | Population 1991 Census | Population 2001 Census | Population 2011 Census |
|---|---|---|---|---|---|
| Faridpur District | Faridpur | 2,052.68 | 1,505,686 | 1,756,470 | 1,912,969 |
| Gopalganj District | Gopalganj | 1,468.74 | 1,060,791 | 1,165,273 | 1,172,415 |
| Madaripur District | Madaripur | 1,125.69 | 1,069,176 | 1,146,349 | 1,165,952 |
| Rajbari District | Rajbari | 1,092.28 | 835,173 | 951,906 | 1,049,778 |
| Shariatpur District | Shariatpur | 1,174.05 | 953,021 | 1,082,300 | 1,155,824 |
| Total | 5 | 6,913.44 | 5,423,847 | 6,102,298 | 6,456,938 |

== Demographics ==
The division would have a population of 7,235,343. 6,386,595 (88.27%) are Muslims, 829,732 (11.47%) Hindus.

== See also ==
- Cumilla Division
- List of people from Greater Faridpur
