= Kazi Abdur Rashid =

Bangladeshi politician

- কাজী আবদুর রশিদ

Member of Parliament

Personal details
- Party: Bangladesh Awami League

Kazi Abdur Rashid was a Bangladesh Awami League politician and the former Member of Parliament from Gopalganj-1.

== Career ==
Rashid fought in the Bangladesh Liberation war. He was elected to Parliament in 1991 from Gopalganj-1 as a Bangladesh Awami League candidate. He served as the administrator of Gopalganj District Council.

== Death ==
Rashid died on 14 August 2014 in Dhaka, Bangladesh.
