= Nilufer Zafarullah =

Bangladeshi politician

- নিলুফার জাফরউল্লাহ
- Born: Nilufer Zafar Ullah; 6 June 1949 (age 77)
- Occupation: politician
- Known for: Bangladesh Awami League member of the Jatiyo Sangshad
- Spouse: Kazi Zafarullah

Nilufer Zafarullah (born 6 June 1949) is a Bangladeshi politician who was a member of the 9th and 10th parliaments from the Bangladesh Awami League. She is a Director of Chittagong Independent University and Independent University Bangladesh.

== Career ==
Zafarullah is an architect.

Zafarullah is a founding trustee of the Education, Science, Technology and Cultural Development Trust, the founding trust of Independent University, Bangladesh, and Chittagong Independent University. She was the Chairperson of Midland Bank Limited. Zafarullah served as vice-chairperson of Midland Bank from its establishment until 2018, when she became chairperson of its board of directors. she is a director of Hong Kong Shanghai Manjala Textiles Limited.

Zafarullah is a donor trustee of the Begum Zebunnesa and Kazi Mahabubullah Jono Kallyan Trust. She is also a life member of Zonta International, an organisation focused on advancing women's rights and opportunities. She served as director of Zonta International District 25, which covers Bangladesh, India, Nepal and Sri Lanka. She was the lieutenant governor of Zonta International District 25 from 1994 to 1996 and from 2006 to 2008, respectively.

Zafarullah was elected to Parliament in 2009 as a candidate of the Awami League. She chaired the Parliamentary Standing Committee on the Ministry of Foreign Affairs from 2012 to 2013. She was re-elected to parliament in 2014.

Zafarullah was named in the 2016 Panama Papers leak. She is the current chairman of a commercial bank, Midland Bank Ltd. She is a director of Hong Kong Shanghai Manjala Textiles Limited. In January 2025, Mohammad Zakaria Khan succeded her as chairman of Education, Science, Technology and Cultural Development Trust.

In October 2026, a Dhaka court ordered the freezing of 24 bank accounts held in Zafarullah's name at Midland Bank and Premier Bank, containing deposits totalling BDT 262.5 million, as part of an investigation by the Anti-Corruption Commission (ACC). The ACC also reported that she held a double-locker facility at Midland Bank. The order formed part of a wider action involving 171 bank accounts and fixed deposit receipts belonging to her husband, Kazi Zafarullah their three children and herself. According to the ACC's application, the freezing order was sought to prevent the transfer or disposal of assets while the investigation was ongoing.

== Personal life ==
Zafarullah is married to Awami League presidium member and member of parliament from Faridpur-4 Kazi Zafarullah. After the fall of the Sheikh Hasina-led Awami League government, her husband was arrested on 18 September 2024.
