= Mujibur Rahman Howlader =

Bangladeshi politician

- মুজিবুর রহমান হাওলাদার

Member of Parliament
- In office 15 February 1996 – 12 June 1996
- Preceded by: Sheikh Hasina
- Succeeded by: Sheikh Hasina
- Constituency: Gopalganj-3

Personal details
- Party: Bangladesh Awami League

Mujibur Rahman Howlader is a Bangladesh Awami League politician and the former Member of Parliament from Gopalganj-3.

== Career ==
Howlader was elected to Parliament in February 1996 from Gopalganj-3 as a Bangladesh Nationalist Party (BNP) candidate. Later he joined the Awami League. He is the Chairman of Kotalipara Upazila Awami League.
