= S M Jilani =

Bangladeshi politician (born 1969)

- এস এম জিলানী
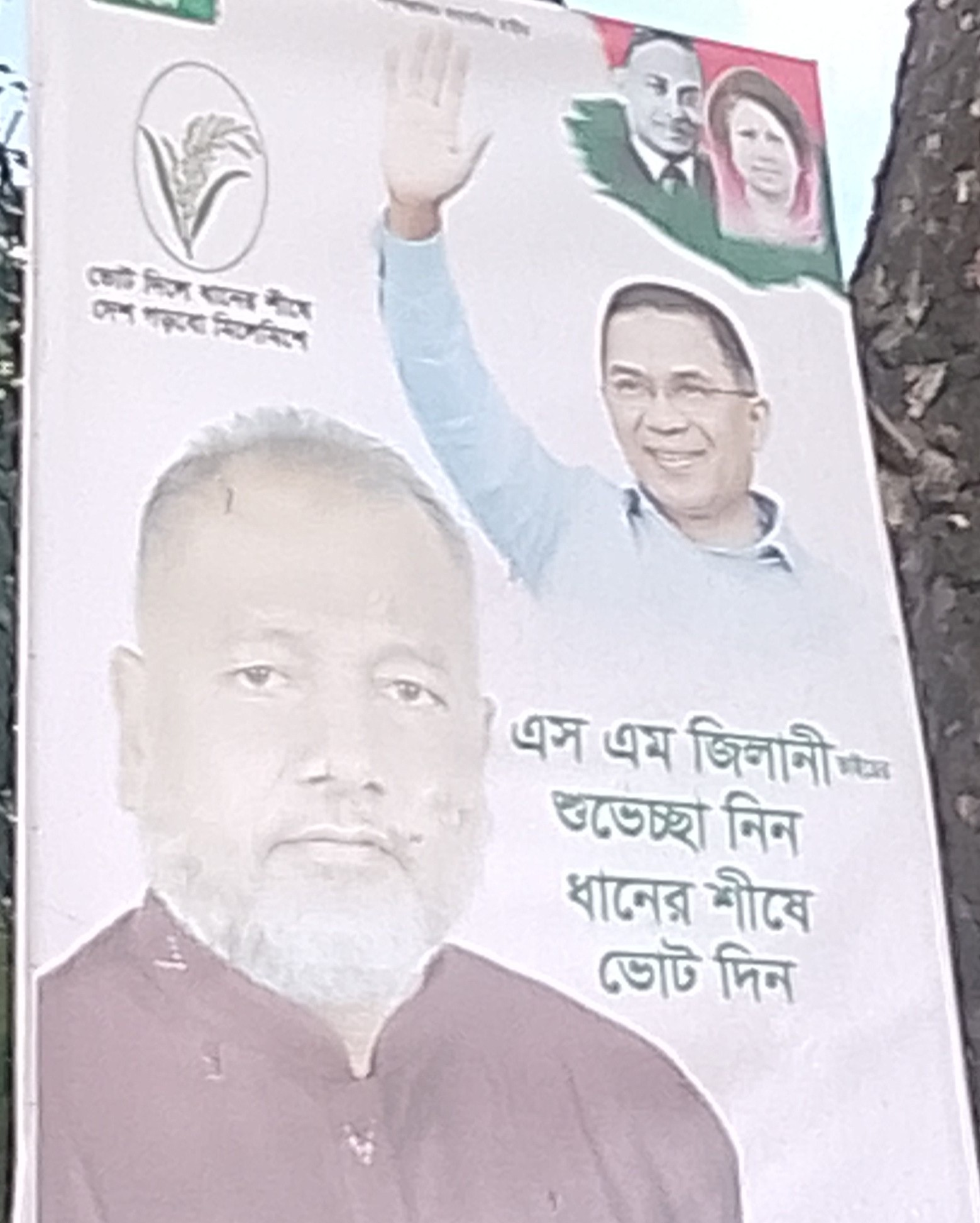
- Campaign poster

Member of Parliament
- Incumbent
- Assumed office 17 February 2026
- Preceded by: Sheikh Hasina
- Constituency: Gopalganj-3

Personal details
- Born: 2 June 1969 (age 57) Tungipara, Gopalganj, East Pakistan
- Party: Bangladesh Nationalist Party

S M Jilani is a Bangladeshi politician. As of March 2026, he is serving as a Member of Parliament from Gopalganj-3.

== Early life ==
Jilani was born on 2 June 1969 at Tungipara Upazila under Gopalganj District.

== Political career ==
In November 2026 his office was burned down by members of the banned Awami League. This was done amidst the 2026 Bangladeshi unrest.
