= Sheikh Hasina =

Prime Minister of Bangladesh (1996–2001, 2009–2024)

- শেখ হাসিনা
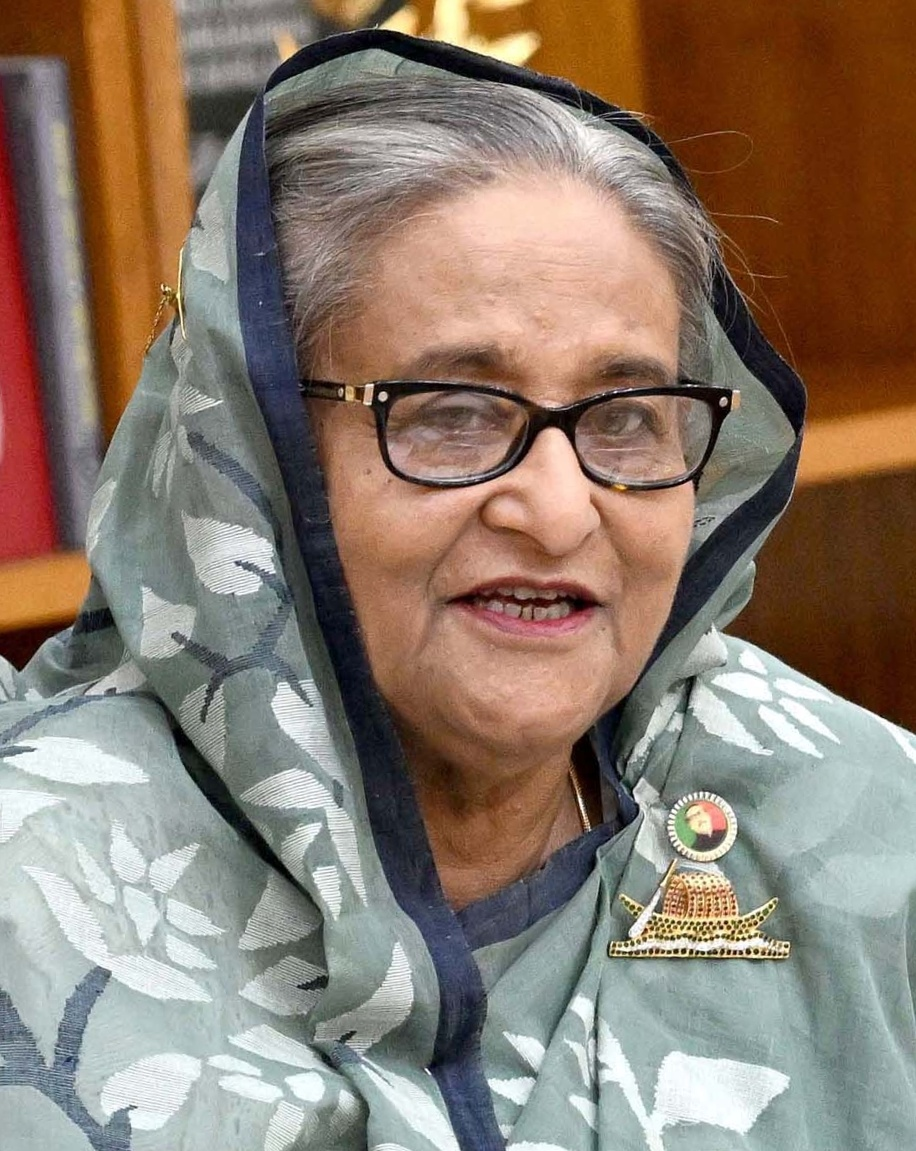
- Hasina in 2024

Prime Minister of Bangladesh
- In office 6 January 2009 – 5 August 2024
- President: Iajuddin Ahmed; Zillur Rahman; Mohammad Abdul Hamid; Mohammed Shahabuddin
- Preceded by: Fakhruddin Ahmed (as chief adviser)
- Succeeded by: Muhammad Yunus (as chief adviser)
- In office 23 June 1996 – 15 July 2001
- President: Abdur Rahman Biswas; Shahabuddin Ahmed
- Preceded by: Muhammad Habibur Rahman (as chief adviser)
- Succeeded by: Latifur Rahman (as chief adviser)

President of Bangladesh Awami League
- Incumbent
- Assumed office 16 February 1981
- General Secretary: Abdur Razzaq; Syeda Sajeda Chowdhury; Zillur Rahman; Abdul Jalil; Sayed Ashraful Islam; Obaidul Quader
- Preceded by: Abdul Malek Ukil

Member of the Bangladesh Parliament for Gopalganj-3
- In office 12 June 1996 – 6 August 2024
- Preceded by: Mujibur Rahman Howlader
- Succeeded by: S M Jilani
- In office 27 February 1991 – 15 February 1996
- Preceded by: Kazi Firoz Rashid
- Succeeded by: Mujibur Rahman Howlader

Leader of the Opposition
- In office 10 October 2001 – 29 October 2006
- Prime Minister: Khaleda Zia
- Preceded by: Khaleda Zia
- Succeeded by: Khaleda Zia
- In office 20 March 1991 – 30 March 1996
- Prime Minister: Khaleda Zia
- Preceded by: Abdur Rab
- Succeeded by: Khaleda Zia
- In office 7 May 1986 – 3 March 1988
- President: Hussain Muhammad Ershad
- Preceded by: Asaduzzaman Khan
- Succeeded by: Abdur Rab

Personal details
- Born: Hasina Sheikh; 28 September 1947 (age 79) Tungipara, East Bengal, Pakistan
- Party: Bangladesh Awami League
- Other political affiliations: Grand Alliance (2008–2024)
- Spouse: M. A. Wazed Miah (m. 1968; died 2009)
- Children: Sajeeb; Saima
- Parents: Sheikh Mujibur Rahman (father); Sheikh Fazilatunnesa Mujib (mother)
- Relatives: Tungipara Sheikh family
- Education: Eden Mohila College (BA); University of Dhaka (MA)
- Awards: Full list
- Website: www.sheikhhasina.blog
- Criminal information
- Status: Self-imposed exile in India; Subject of arrest warrant by the International Crimes Tribunal
- Criminal charge: Crimes against humanity during July Uprising
- Penalty: Death (in absentia)
- Wanted by: Bangladesh
- Wanted since: 2024

Sheikh Hasina Wazed (Note: Bengali: শেখ হাসিনা ওয়াজেদ, romanised: Śēkh Hāsinā Ōẏājēd, Bengali pronunciation: [ˈʃeːkʰ ˈɦasina waːd͡ʒed]) (born 28 September 1947) is a Bangladeshi politician who twice served as the Prime Minister of Bangladesh from 1996 to 2001 and again from 2009 until her resignation in 2024. She is Bangladesh's longest-serving prime minister and the longest-serving female head of government in history. A daughter of Sheikh Mujibur Rahman, the first President of Bangladesh, she has also served as president of the Awami League since 1981.

Born to the Sheikh family of Tungipara in Gopalganj, Hasina had little presence in politics prior to the assassination of her father in 1975. After years in exile, she returned to Bangladesh in 1981, leading the Awami League in opposition to military rule. Alongside Khaleda Zia, her future longtime political rival in what was termed the Battle of Begums, she played a key role in the 1990 mass uprising that restored parliamentary democracy. After serving as Leader of the Opposition from 1991 to 1996, she won the June 1996 general election, beginning her first term as prime minister. She served as Leader of the Opposition again from 2001 to 2006, before winning a second term at the 2008 general election.

Hasina's second premiership was marked by significant economic and infrastructural development, as well as democratic backsliding, enforced disappearances, human rights abuses and restrictions on political opposition and press freedom. (Note: Multiple references:) Under Hasina's rule, the Bangladeshi political system was transformed into an authoritarian dictatorship with a cult of personality around her father and other members of the family. Critics accused her government of consolidating power, corruption and embezzlement of foreign reserves. Observers raised serious allegations of electoral irregularities in the 2014, 2018 and 2024 general elections.

In July 2024, security forces led by the Awami League repressed a students quota reform movement, resulting in the deaths of over 1,400 protesters. The movement subsequently coalesced into an uprising and non-cooperation movement, leading to her resignation and exile to India and bringing an end to her 15-year premiership. In November 2025, she was convicted in absentia by the Bangladeshi International Crimes Tribunal on charges of crimes against humanity, including ordering lethal force against protesters, and sentenced to death, which she rejected as politically motivated.

Hasina was among Time magazine's 100 most influential people in the world in 2018, and was listed as being one of the 100 most powerful women in the world by Forbes in 2015, 2018 and 2022. (Note: Multiple references:)

== Early life ==
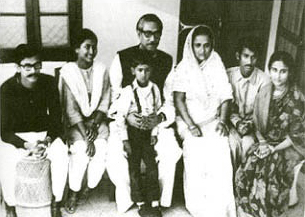
Hasina (righmost) with her parents and siblings in the 1970s.

Hasina Sheikh was born on 28 September 1947 to the Bengali Muslim Sheikh family of Tungipara in East Bengal, Pakistan (now in Dhaka Division, Bangladesh). Her father was Sheikh Mujibur Rahman and her mother was Begum Fazilatunnesa Mujib. Hasina grew up in Tungipara during her early childhood under the care of her mother and grandmother. When the family moved to Dhaka, they initially lived in the neighbourhood of Segunbagicha.

When Hasina's father became a government minister in 1954, the family lived on 3 Minto Road. In the 1950s, her father also worked in the Alpha Insurance Company, aside from his political activities. In the 1960s, the family moved into a home built by her father on Road 32 in Dhanmondi. In many interviews and speeches, Hasina talked about growing up while her father was held as a political prisoner by the Pakistani government. In one interview, she remarked, "For instance, after the United Front Ministry was elected in 1954, and we were living in No 3 Minto Road, one day, my mother told us that father had been arrested the night before. Then we used to visit him in jail and we always realised that he was put in jail so often because he loved the people." Hasina and her siblings had limited time to spend with their father because of his preoccupation with politics.

=== Family murder and first exile ===
Except for her husband, children and sister Sheikh Rehana, Hasina's entire family was murdered during the 15 August 1975 Bangladeshi coup d'état which saw the assassination of Sheikh Mujibur Rahman. Hasina, Wazed and Rehana were visiting Europe at the time of the assassination. They took refuge in the house of the Bangladeshi ambassador to West Germany; before taking up an offer of political asylum from Prime Minister Indira Gandhi of India. The surviving members of the family lived in exile in New Delhi, India for six years. Hasina was barred from entering Bangladesh by the military government of Ziaur Rahman.

== Early political career ==
=== Return and movement against military rule (1981–1991) ===
While living in exile in India, Hasina was elected President of the Awami League on 16 February 1981. The party has been described as centre-left. Hasina returned to Bangladesh on 17 May and received a welcome from thousands of Awami League supporters.

Under martial law, Hasina was in and out of detention throughout the 1980s. In 1984, she was put under house arrest in February and again in November. In March 1985, she was put under house arrest for three months.

Hasina and the AL participated in the 1986 Bangladeshi general election held under President Hussain Muhammad Ershad. She served as the leader of the parliamentary opposition, an eight-party alliance, from 1986 to 1987. Her decision to take part in the election had been criticised by her opponents, since the election was held under martial law, and the other main opposition group boycotted the poll. However, her supporters maintained that she used the platform effectively to challenge Ershad's rule. Ershad dissolved the parliament in December 1987 when Hasina and her Awami League resigned in an attempt to call for a fresh general election to be held under a neutral government. During November and December in 1987, a mass uprising happened in Dhaka and several people were killed, including Noor Hossain, an Awami League activist and supporter of Hasina.

Her party, along with the Bangladesh Nationalist Party (BNP) under Khaleda Zia, continued to work to restore democratically elected government, which they achieved after a constitutional referendum returning the country to a parliamentary form of government.

The subsequent parliamentary general election in 1991 was won by the BNP.

=== Leader of the Opposition (1991–1996) ===
After several years of autocratic rule, widespread protests and strikes had paralysed the economy. Government officers refused to follow orders and resigned. Members of the Bangladesh Rifles laid down their weapons instead of firing on protestors and curfew was openly violated. Hasina worked with Khaleda Zia in organising opposition to Ershad. A huge mass protest in December 1990 ousted Ershad from power when he resigned in favour of his vice president, Justice Shahabuddin Ahmed, the chief justice of the Bangladesh Supreme Court. The caretaker government, headed by Ahmed, administered a general election for the parliament. The BNP, led by Khaleda Zia, won a general majority, and Hasina's Awami League emerged as the largest opposition party.

Politics in Bangladesh took a decisive turn in 1994, after a by-election in Magura-2, held after the death of the member of parliament for that constituency, a member of Hasina's party. The Awami League had expected to win back the seat, but the BNP candidate won through rigging and manipulation, according to the neutral parties who witnessed the election. Hasina led the Bangladesh Awami League in boycotting the parliament from 1994.

== First premiership (1996–2001) ==
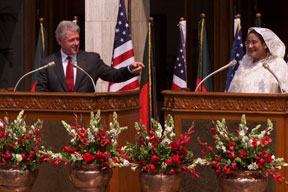
Hasina with U.S. President Bill Clinton at the Prime Minister's Office in Dhaka, 2000

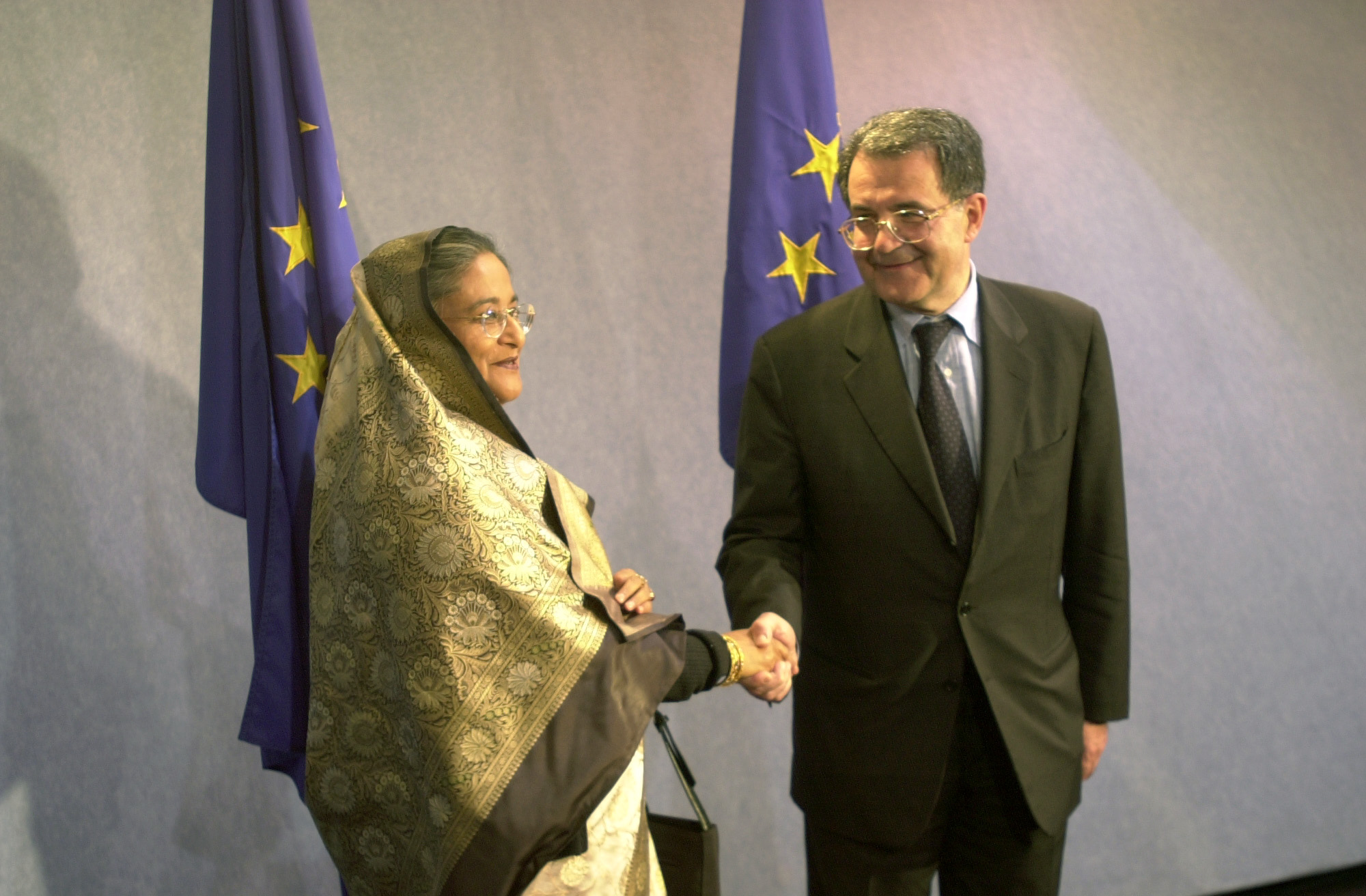
Hasina with European Commission President Romano Prodi in Brussels, 2001

The Awami League (AL), with other opposition parties, demanded that the next general elections be held under a neutral caretaker government, and that provision for caretaker governments to manage elections be incorporated in the constitution. The ruling BNP refused to act on these demands.

Opposition parties launched an unprecedented campaign, calling strikes for weeks on end. The Government accused them of destroying the economy while the opposition countered that the BNP could resolve the issue by acceding to their demands. In late 1995, the members of parliament of the AL and other parties resigned en masse. Parliament completed its five-year term and the February 1996 general election was held. The election was boycotted by all major parties except the ruling BNP, who won all the seats in the parliament as a result. Hasina described the election as a farce.

The new parliament, composed almost entirely of BNP members, amended the constitution to create provisions for a caretaker government (CTG). The June 1996 general election was held under a neutral caretaker government headed by retired Chief Justice Muhammad Habibur Rahman. The AL won 146 seats, a plurality, but fell short of a simple majority. Khaleda Zia, leader of the BNP who won 104 seats, denounced the results and alleged vote rigging. This was in contrast with the neutral observers who said that the election was free and fair.

Hasina served her first term as Prime Minister of Bangladesh from June 1996 to July 2001. She signed the 30-year water-sharing treaty with India governing the Ganges. Her administration repealed the Indemnity Act, which granted immunity from prosecution to the killers of Sheikh Mujib. Her government opened-up the telecommunications industry to the private sector, which until then was limited to government-owned companies. In December 1997, Hasina's administration signed the Chittagong Hill Tracts Peace Accord, ending the insurgency in the Chittagong Division for which Hasina won the UNESCO Peace Prize. Her government established the Ashrayan-1 Project while bilateral relations with neighbouring states improved. Hasina's government completed the Bangabandhu Bridge mega project in 1998. In 1999, the government started the New Industrial Policy (NIP) which aimed to strengthen the private sector and encourage growth.

The Hasina government implemented some reforms to different sectors of the economy, which resulted in the country attaining an average of 5.5% GDP growth. The consumer price index remained at 5%, lower than other developing states who experienced 10% inflation. The Fifth Five-Year Plan (1997–2002) of the government placed an emphasis on poverty alleviation programmes which provided credit and training to unemployed youths and women. Food-grain production increased from 19 million tons to 26.5 million tons while the poverty rate reduced. A Housing Fund was established to provide fiscal assistance to those homeless as a result of river erosion. The government launched the Ekti Bari Ekti Khamar scheme which accentuated the incomes of the poorer segments of society through household farming.

The Hasina government adopted the New Industrial Policy in 1999 which aimed to bolster the private sector and attract foreign direct investment, thus expediating the globalisation process. The NIP aimed for 25% of the economy to be industry based with 20% of the country's workforce employed in industry. It encouraged the institution of small, cottage and labour-intensive industries with an onus on skill development for women for employment, development of indigenous technology and industries based on local raw materials. The NIP allowed for foreign investors to own 100% equity in Bangladeshi enterprises without prior approval from the government and all but four sectors of the economy were opened up to the private sector.

Attempts were made to create a social security system to protect the most vulnerable in society. The Hasina administration introduced an allowance scheme which resulted in 400,000 elderly people receiving monthly allowances. This scheme was later extended to widows, distressed and deserted women. A national foundation devoted to rehabilitation and training of people, with disabilities was founded with an initial grant of ৳100 million funded by the government. The Ashrayan-1 Project provided shelter and employment to the homeless.

Hasina was the first prime minister to engage in a "Prime Minister's Question-Answer Time" in the Jatiya Sangsad. The Jatiya Sangsad repealed the Indemnity Act, allowing for the killers of Bangabandhu Sheikh Mujibur Rahman to be prosecuted. The government introduced a four-tier system of local government including the Gram Parishad, Zila Parishad and Upazila Parishad by passing legislation.

The Hasina government liberalised the telecommunications industry, initially granting four licences to private companies to provide cellular mobile telephone services. This resulted in the previous state monopoly being disbanded meaning prices began to reduce and access became more widespread. The government established the Bangladesh Telecommunication Regulatory Commission to regulate the newly liberalised telecommunications industry.

The government established the National Policy for Women's Advancement which sought to ensure equality between men and women. The policy aimed to guarantee security and employment, create an educated and skilled workforce, eliminate discrimination and repression against women, establish human rights and end poverty and ensure participation in socio-economic development. The government introduced three reserved seats for women in all Union Parishad election in December 1997. Hasina's cabinet approved the National Plan of Action for Children in 1999 to ensure rights and improved upbringing.

Hasina attended the World Micro Credit summit in Washington DC; the World Food Summit in Rome; the Inter-Parliamentary Union Conference in India; the OIC summit in Pakistan; the 9th SAARC summit in the Maldives; the first D-8 summit in Turkey; the 5th World Conference for the Aged in Germany; the Commonwealth summit in the UK and the OIC summit in Iran. Hasina also visited the United States, Saudi Arabia, Japan, the Philippines and Indonesia.

Bangladesh joined two multilateral bodies, the Bay of Bengal Initiative for Multi-Sectoral Technical and Economic Cooperation (BIMSTEC) and D-8 Organization for Economic Cooperation (D-8). She became the first Bangladeshi prime minister since independence to complete an entire five-year term.

In the 2001 general election, despite winning 40% of the popular vote (slightly less than BNP's 41%), the AL won just 62 seats in parliament as a result of the first past-the-post electoral system, while the 'Four Party Alliance' led by BNP won 234 seats, giving them a two-thirds majority in parliament. Hasina herself ran in three constituencies, and was defeated in a constituency in Rangpur, which included her husband's hometown, but won in two other seats. Hasina and the AL rejected the results, claiming that the election was rigged with the assistance of the president and the caretaker government. The international community was largely satisfied with the elections, and the 'Four Party Alliance' went on to form a government.

== Leader of the Opposition (2001–2008) ==
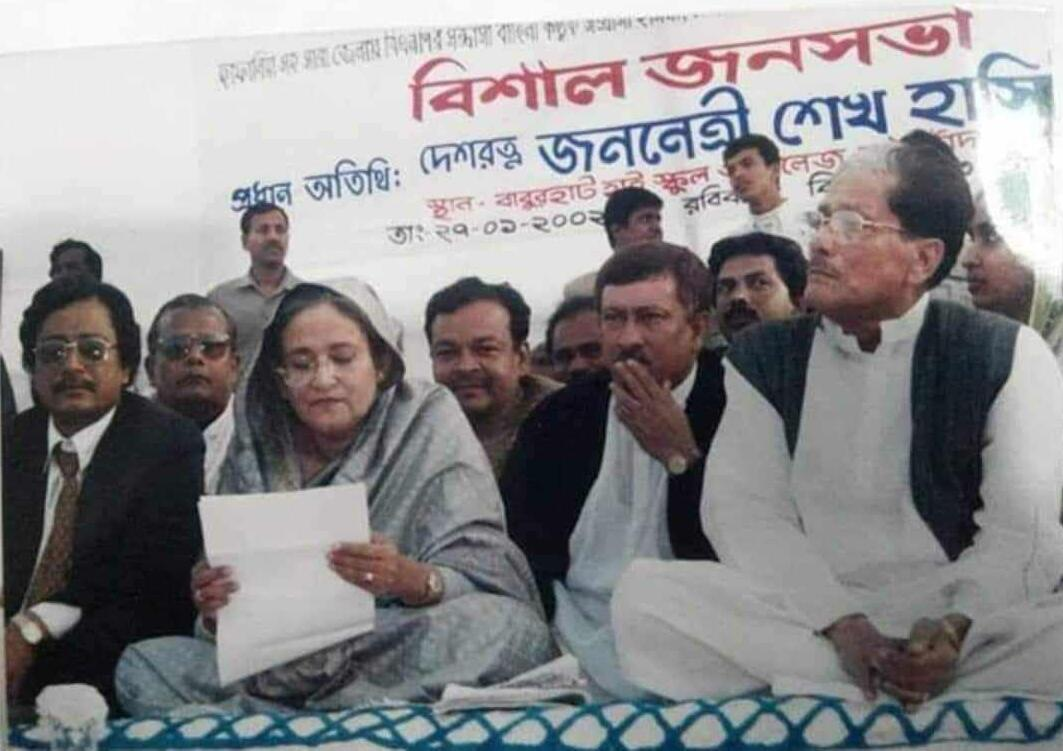
Hasina as the leader of opposition at a party demonstration in 2002.

The Awami League MPs were irregular in attending parliament during the following period. In late 2003, the Awami League started its first major anti-government movement, culminating in the declaration by party general secretary Abdul Jolil that the government would fall before 30 April 2004.

=== Assassination attempt (2004) ===
During her second term as leader of the opposition, political unrest and violence increased. MP Ahsanullah Master died after he was shot in May 2004. This was followed by a grenade attack on 21 August on an Awami League gathering in Dhaka, resulting in the death of 24 party supporters, including Ivy Rahman, party women's secretary. In October 2018, a special court gave verdicts in two cases filed over the incident; the court ruled that it was a well-orchestrated plan, executed through abuse of state power, and all the accused, including BNP Senior vice-chairman Tarique Rahman (in absentia) and former top intelligence officials, were found guilty. The court prescribed various punishments. However, on 1 December 2024, Tarique Rahman and few others was acquitted by the high court in this case. SAMS Kibria, Hasina's close advisor and former finance minister was assassinated that year (2004) in a grenade attack in Sylhet.

In June 2005, A. B. M. Mohiuddin Chowdhury, the incumbent AL Mayor, won an important election in Chittagong, the second-largest city in Bangladesh. This election was seen as a showdown between the opposition and the ruling party.

=== Logi Boitha Movement ===
On 28 October 2006, Sheikh Hasina and Awami League convened a rally in Dhaka opposing BNP government moves to have Khondokar Mahmud Hasan appointed as chief advisor of the caretaker government responsible for holding upcoming elections. Thousands of Awami League workers occupied streets of Dhaka with boathooks and oars for several days, the rally being known as the Logi Boitha Movement ('Boat-hook and Oar Movement'). The rally resulted in a number of casualties, vandalisms, lootings as well as soaring prices of daily commodities.

In May 2007, the police filed chargesheet against 19 leaders and activists of the Awami League and its affiliates for vandalising, setting fire to and looting the office of the Islamic Social Welfare Council but all of them were acquitted in court in June 2011.

=== Detention during military intervention (2006–2008) ===
The months preceding the planned 22 January 2007 elections were filled with political unrest and controversy. Following the end of Khaleda Zia's government in October 2006, there were protests and strikes, during which 40 people were killed in the following month, over uncertainty about who would head the Caretaker Government. The caretaker government had difficulty bringing all parties to the table. The AL and its allies protested and alleged that the caretaker government favoured the BNP.

The interim period was marred with violence and strikes. Presidential Advisor Mukhlesur Rahman Chowdhury negotiated with Hasina and Khaleda Zia and brought all the parties to the planned 22 January 2007 parliamentary elections. Later the nomination of Ershad was cancelled by the returning officer of the Election Commission as Ershad had been convicted on a corruption case. As a result, the Grand Alliance withdrew its candidates en masse on the last day possible. They demanded that a voters' roll be published.

Later in the month, President Iajuddin Ahmed was compelled to declare a state of emergency. Consequently, Lt General Moeen Uddin Ahmed took control of the government. Political activity was prohibited. Fakhruddin Ahmed became the chief advisor with the support of the Bangladesh Army.

Hasina went to the United States embassy on 14 March 2007 along with Kazi Zafarullah and Tarique Ahmed Siddique. She would fly the next day to the United States accompanied by Tareq Ahmed Siddique and Abdus Sobhan Golap. She visited her son and daughter who live in the United States. She then moved to the United Kingdom.

In April 2007, Hasina was charged with graft and extortion by the military-backed caretaker government during the 2006–2008 political crisis. She was accused of having forced businessman Tajul Islam Farooq to pay bribes in 1998 before his company could build a power plant. Farooq said that he paid Hasina for approving his project.

On 18 April 2007, the Government barred Hasina from returning, stating that she had made provocative statements and that her return could cause disorder. This was described as a temporary measure. The Caretaker Government had also been trying to get Khaleda Zia to leave the country. Hasina vowed to return home, and on 22 April 2007, a warrant was issued for her arrest for murder. Describing the case against her as "totally false and fake", Hasina said that she wanted to defend herself against the charges in court. On 23 April 2007, the arrest warrant was suspended, and on 25 April 2007, the ban on Hasina's entry was dropped. After spending 51 days in the United States and the United Kingdom, on 7 May 2007 Hasina returned to Dhaka, where she was greeted by a crowd of several thousand. She told reporters that the government should not have delayed her return.

On 16 July 2007, Hasina was arrested by police at her home and taken before a local court in Dhaka. She was accused of extortion and denied bail and was held in a building converted into jail on the premises of the National Parliament. The AL said the arrest was politically motivated. On 17 July 2007, the Anti-Corruption Commission sent notices to both Hasina and Khaleda Zia, instructing them to provide details of their assets within one week. Hasina's son Sajeeb Wazed was out of the country and said he would try to organise a worldwide protest. These arrests of the political leaders were widely seen as a move by the military-backed interim government to force Hasina and Zia out of the country and into political exile. United Kingdom MPs condemned the arrest.

On 11 April 2007, the police filed murder charges against Hasina, alleging that she masterminded the killing in October 2006 of four supporters of a rival political party. The four alleged victims were beaten to death during clashes between the AL and rival party activists. Hasina was visiting the United States at the time.

On 30 July 2007, the High Court suspended Hasina's extortion trial and ordered her release on bail. On 2 September 2007, an additional case was filed against Hasina by the Anti-Corruption Commission regarding the awarding of a contract for the construction of a power plant in 1997, for which she allegedly took a bribe of 30 million takas and kept the contract from going to the lowest bidder. Six others were also accused of involvement. A graft case was filed against Zia on the same day.

On 13 January 2008, Hasina was indicted on extortion charges by a special court along with two of her relatives, her sister Sheikh Rehana and her cousin Sheikh Selim. On 6 February, the High Court stopped the trial, ruling that she could not be prosecuted under emergency laws for crimes alleged to have been committed prior to the imposition of the state of emergency.

On 11 June 2008, Hasina was released on parole for medical reasons. The next day she flew to the United States to be treated for hearing impairment, eye problems and high blood pressure. Syed Modasser Ali, her personal physician, threatened to sue the caretaker government over negligence regarding Hasina's treatment during her detention.

The caretaker government held mayoral elections in which AL won 12 out of 13 elections. The government extended her two-month medical parole by one more month.

== Second premiership (2009–2024) ==
=== Second term (2009–2014) ===
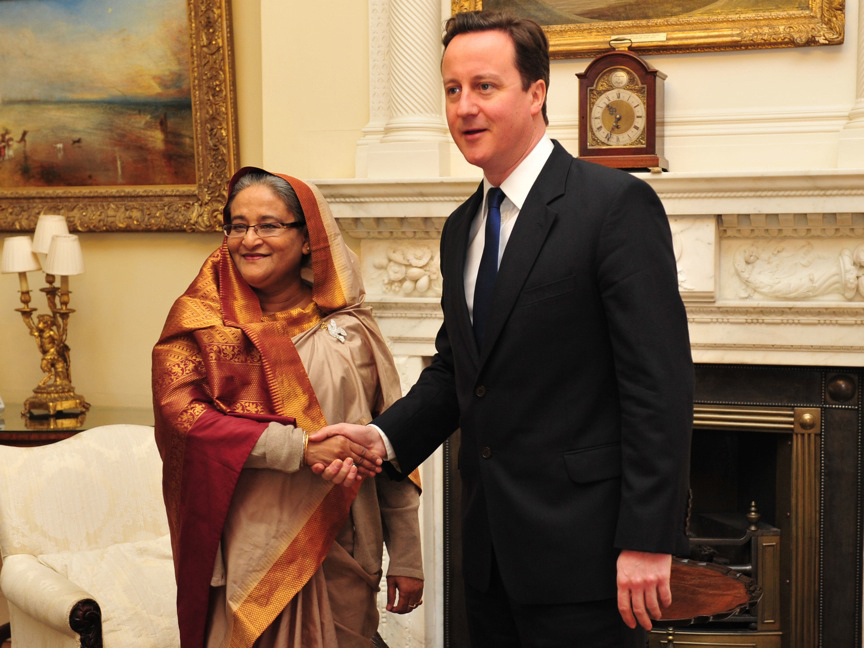
Hasina with British Prime Minister David Cameron at 10 Downing Street (January 2011)

On 6 November 2008, Hasina returned to Bangladesh to contest the 2008 general election scheduled for 29 December. She decided to participate in the parliamentary election under the banner of the "Grand Alliance" with the Jatiya Party, led by Hussain Muhammad Ershad, as its main partner. On 11 December 2008, Hasina formally announced her party's election manifesto during a news conference and vowed to build a "Digital Bangladesh" by 2021.

The AL manifesto was entitled A Charter for Change and included the party's commitment to Vision 2021. The manifesto included pledges to implement measures to reduce price hikes; combat corruption by strengthening the independent ACC and submission of annual wealth statements by influential people; introduction of a long-term policy towards power and energy increasing power generation to 7,000 megawatts by 2013; bringing vibrancy to the agriculture sector and extending the safety net to the poor; creating good governance and curtailing terrorism and religious extremism; prosecution of 1971 war criminals; ensuring an independent and impartial judiciary; reforming the electoral system; strengthening the Human Rights Commission and de-politicising the administration.

Her Awami League and the Grand Alliance (a total of 14 parties) won the 2008 general election with a two-thirds majority, having won 230 out of 299 seats. Khaleda Zia, leader of the BNP-led coalition (4-Party Alliance), rejected the results of the election by accusing the chief election commissioner of "stage-managing the parliamentary election". Hasina was sworn into office as prime minister for a second term on 6 January 2009. Independent observers declared that the elections were held in a festive and peaceful atmosphere.

After being elected prime minister, Hasina reneged on her agreement with the Jatiya Party to make Ershad, its leader, the president.

Hasina removed Awami League central committee members who supported reforms forced by the previous caretaker government. She had to confront a major national crisis in the form of the 2009 Bangladesh Rifles revolt over a pay dispute, which resulted in 56 deaths, including Bangladesh Army officers. Hasina was blamed by the army officers due to her refusal to intervene against the revolt. However, In 2009, a recording emerged of Hasina's private meeting with army officers, who expressed their anger with how she had not reacted more decisively in the revolt's early stages, by ordering an armed raid of the BDR Rifles compound; they believed that her efforts to appease the revolt's leaders delayed needed action which led to more deaths. In a 2011 The Daily Star editorial, she was commended for "her sagacious handling of the situation which resulted in the prevention of a further bloodbath".

On 23 December 2024, the Ministry of Home Affairs formed a seven-member commission to re-investigate the BDR mutiny, which released its findings on 30 November 2025 concluding that the incident was a planned operation rather than a spontaneous revolt. The report alleged involvement of senior Awami League figures, including Sheikh Fazle Noor Taposh and Sheikh Hasina, and noted evidence destruction and missing key individuals in the original probe.

In 2011, the parliament removed the law that required non-party caretaker government hold elections. In 2012, she maintained a hard-line stance and refused to allow entry to Rohingya refugees fleeing Myanmar during the 2012 Rakhine State riots.

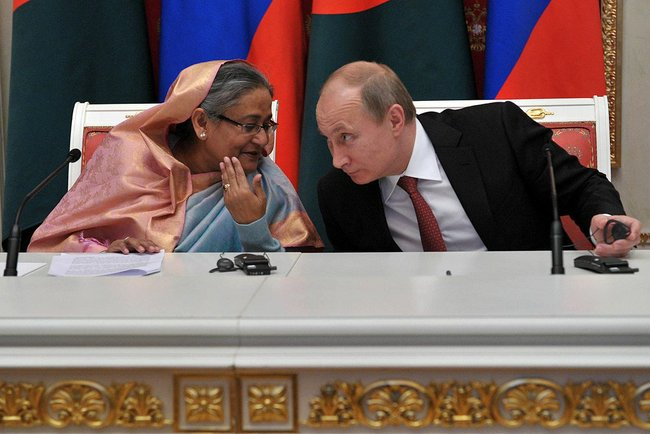
Hasina with Russian President Vladimir Putin at the Kremlin in January 2013

On 27 June 2013, a case against Hasina and 24 other Bangladeshi Ministers and security personnel was lodged at the International Criminal Court (ICC) for the alleged violation of human rights. She has been "credited internationally" for the achievement of some of the United Nations Millennium Development Goals. In 2012 a coup attempt against her by mid-ranking army officers was stopped, with the Bangladesh Army being tipped off by an Indian intelligence agency. The Bangladesh Army described the army officers involved as being Islamist extremists.

In 2012, she had a falling out with Muhammad Yunus, Nobel laureate and founder of Grameen Bank, following a Norwegian documentary that was critical of Yunus's transferring of money from Grameen Bank to an affiliate organisation. Yunus transferred the money back after the documentary aired but it increased scrutiny of the bank by the government and media in Bangladesh. Yunus lost control of his bank following a court verdict. He criticised Hasina and other Bangladeshi politicians. She responded by saying she did not understand why Yunus blamed her when it was a court verdict that removed him from Grameen Bank.

During this term, her government led and succeeded in forming the International Crimes Tribunal, to investigate and prosecute suspects involved in the Bangladesh Genocide, committed by the Pakistan Army and their local collaborators, Razakars, Al-Badr, and Al-Shams during the Bangladesh Liberation War in 1971.

=== Third term (2014–2019) ===
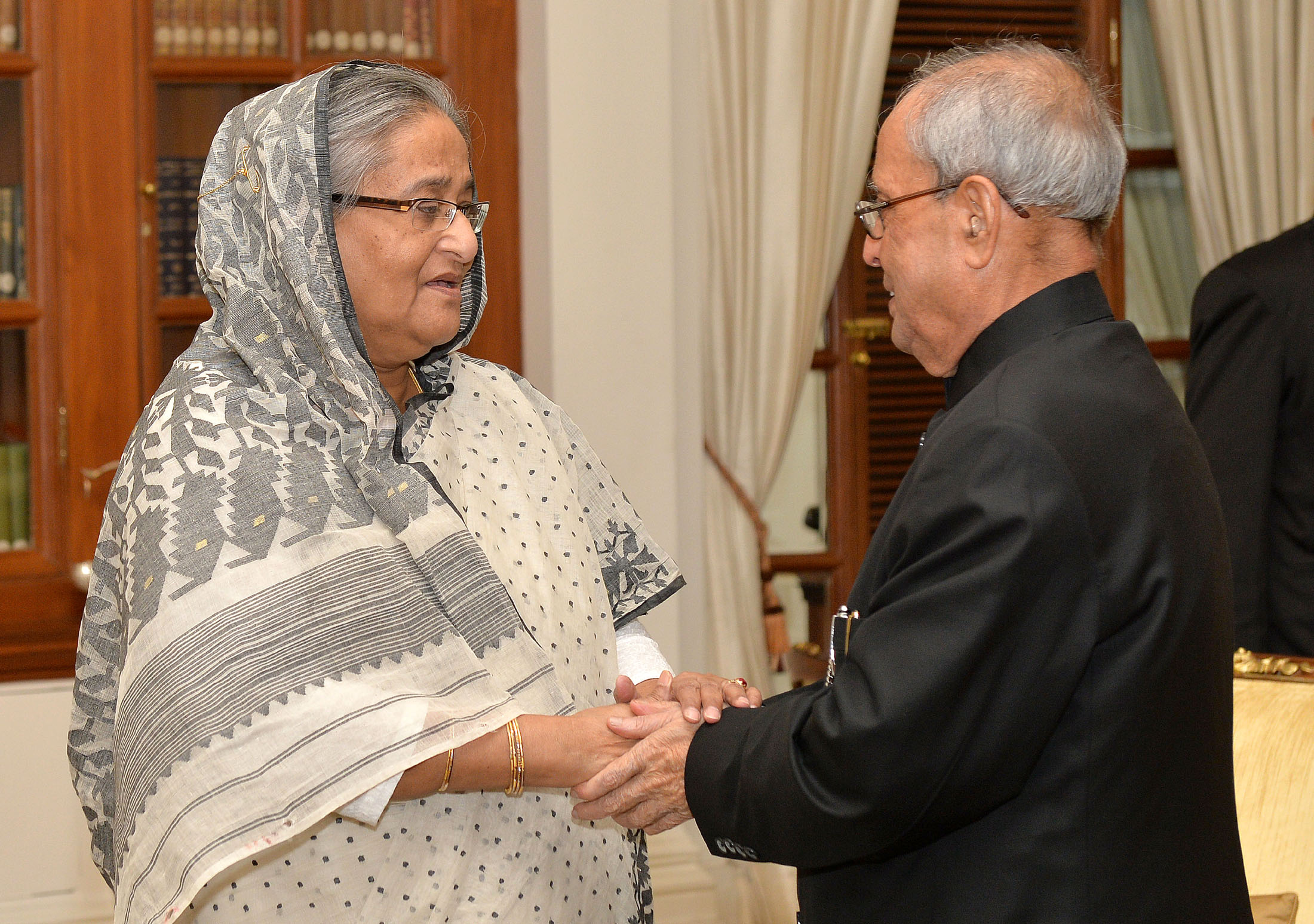
Hasina condoling Indian President Pranab Mukherjee after the death of First Lady Suvra Mukherjee at Rashtrapati Bhavan, New Delhi in 2015.

Hasina secured a second-consecutive term in office with her ruling Awami League and its Grand Alliance allies, winning the 2014 general election by a landslide. The election was boycotted by leading opposition parties due to unfair conditions and a lack of non-partisan administration to conduct elections. As a result, the AL-led Grand Alliance won 267 seats out of which 153 were uncontested, surpassing its 2008 poll success—when it secured 263 parliamentary seats. Sheikh Hasina's Awami League has run Bangladesh since 2009 and won 288 seats in this election. One of the leading opposition parties accused it of using stuffed ballot boxes. The election was boycotted by major opposition parties including the BNP.

The election was controversial, with reports of violence and an alleged crackdown on the opposition in the run-up to the election. In the election 153 seats (of 300) went uncontested, of which the Awami League won 127 by default. Hasina's Awami League won a safe parliamentary majority with a total of 234 seats. As a result of the boycott and violence, voter turnout was lower than the previous few elections at only 51%. The day after the result, Hasina said that the boycott should "not mean there will be a question of legitimacy. People participated in the poll and other parties participated." Despite the controversy Hasina went on to form a government with Ershad's Jatiya Party (who won 34 seats) as the official opposition.

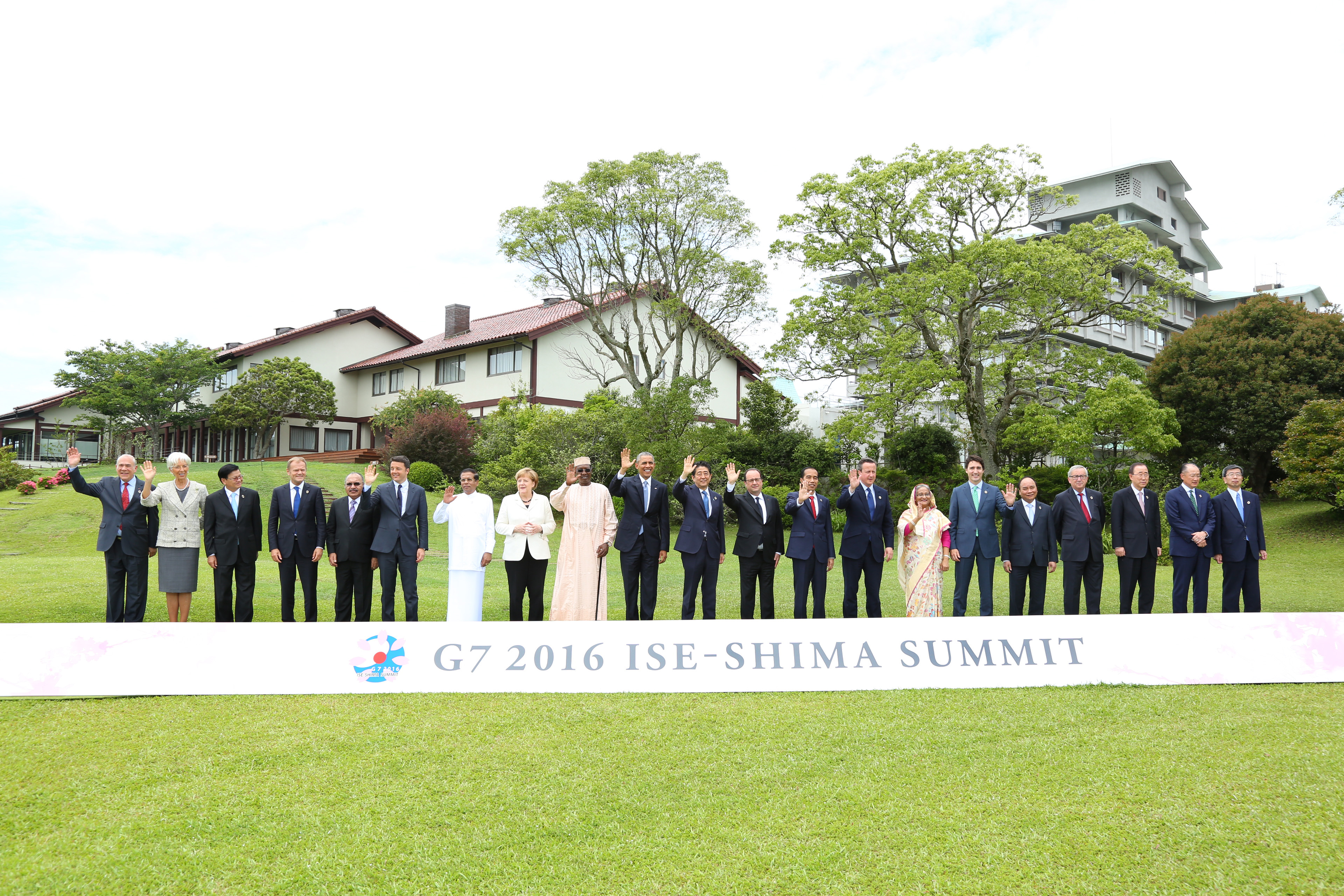
Hasina with G7 Leaders and guests, Shima Kanko Hotel in Japan, 2016

The BNP wanted the elections to be held under a neutral caretaker government and had hoped to use protests to force the government to do so.

During this time corruption remained rampant. The Awami League government allowed politicians, government officials and businessmen to smuggle billions of taka out of the country to Canada, particularly Begum Para, Toronto. The period also saw increasing attacks by Islamic extremists in the country, including the July 2016 Dhaka attack which has been described as "deadliest Islamist attack in Bangladeshi history" by BBC. According to experts, the Hasina-led government's repression of political opposition as well as shrinking democratic and civic space has created "the space for extremist groups to flourish" and "has generated a violent backlash from Islamist groups."

In March 2017, Bangladesh's first two submarines were commissioned. In September 2017, Hasina's government granted refuge and aid to around a million Rohingya refugees and urged Myanmar to end violence against the Rohingya community. The majority of the Bangladeshi people supported the government's decision to provide refugee status to the Rohingya. Hasina received credit and praise for her actions.

Hasina supported calls to remove the Statue of Justice in front of the Supreme Court. This was seen as the government bowing down to the pressure of those who use religion for political ends.

Hasina is a patron of the Asian University for Women, led by Chancellor Cherie Blair, and including the First Lady of Japan, Akie Abe, as well as Irina Bokova, the director-general of UNESCO.

=== Fourth term (2019–2024) ===
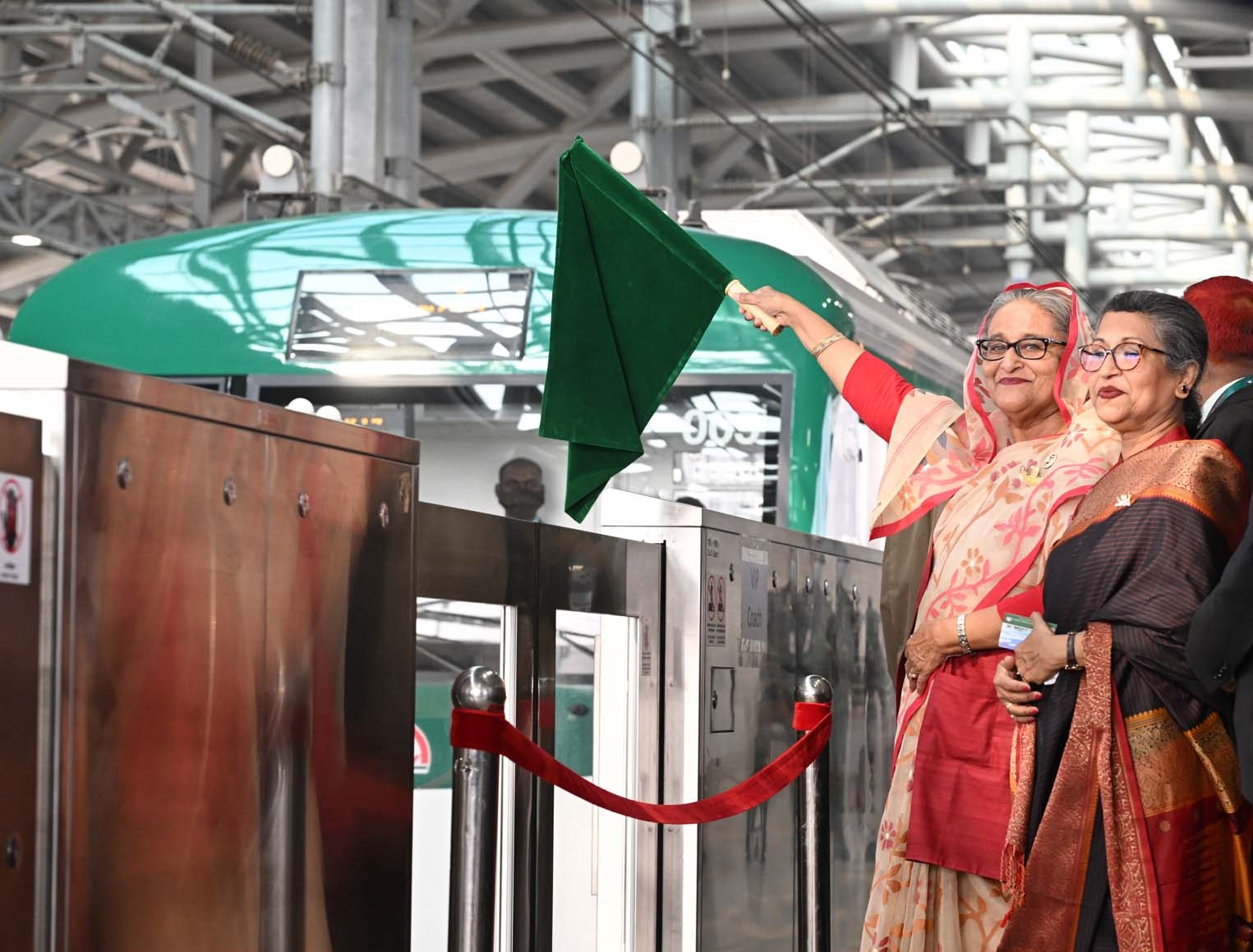
Hasina inagurates Dhaka Metro Rail in 2022, one of the major projects commissioned during her fourth term.

Hasina won her third consecutive term, her fourth overall, when her Awami League won 288 of the 300 parliamentary seats. The leader of the main opposition alliance, Kamal Hossain, declared the vote "farcical" and rejected the results. Before the election, Human Rights Watch and other rights organisations had accused the government of creating an intimidating environment for the Opposition. The New York Times editorial board described the election as farcical and questioned her reasons for vote-rigging, saying that she likely would have won freely.

The BNP fared extremely poorly. Winning only eight seats, the party and its Jatiya Oikya Front alliance have been marginalised to the weakest opposition ever since Bangladesh's post-Ershad democratic restoration in 1991.

In May 2021, Hasina provided the inaugural address for the opening of a new headquarters for the Bangladesh Post Office, named the Dak Bhaban. In her address, Hasina urged for further development of the postal service in response to the COVID-19 pandemic in Bangladesh. Developmental measures outlined in the address include continuing the service's digital transformation, and the construction of cooling units in postal warehouses to pave the way for the sending of perishable food by mail.

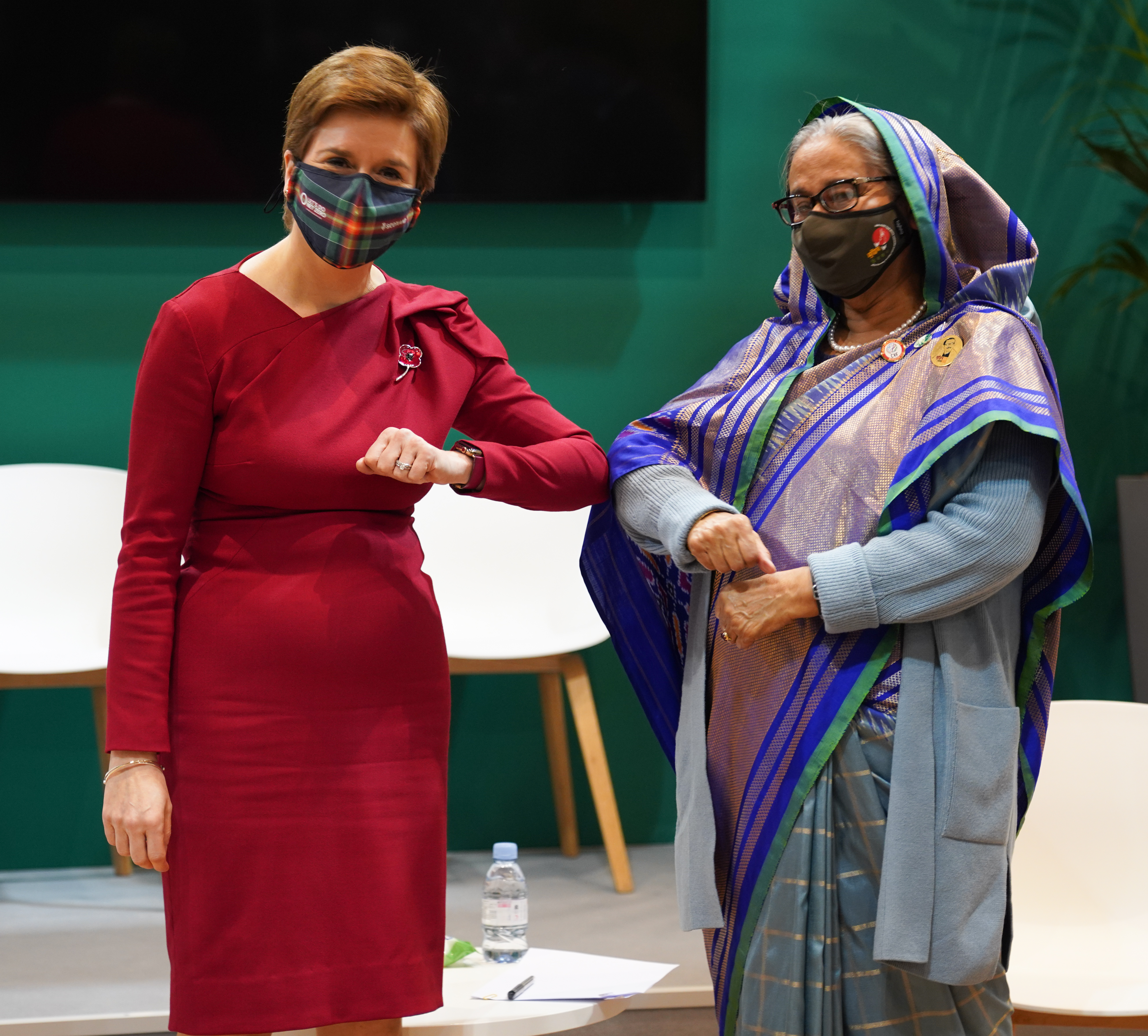
Scottish First Minister Nicola Sturgeon with Hasina in COP26 in 2021

In January 2022, the government passed a law in the Jatiya Sangsad establishing the Universal Pension Scheme. All Bangladeshi citizens, including expatriates, between 18 and 60 years old are eligible to receive a monthly stipend under the scheme.

By the end of fiscal year 2021–22, Bangladesh's external debt reached $95.86 billion, a 238% increase from 2011. The period is also marked by massive irregularities in the banking sector of the country where the amount of default loans went from less than ৳23000 crore (US$1.9 billion) in 2009 to more than ৳250000 crore (US$20 billion) in 2019 according to IMF.

In July 2022, the Finance Ministry requested fiscal assistance from the International Monetary Fund. The government cited depleting foreign-exchange reserves as a result of the sanctions in response to the Russian invasion of Ukraine. A staff level agreement was reached in November 2022 and in January 2023, the IMF agreed to supply a support programme totalling US$4.7 billion, consisting of US$3.3 billion under the Extended Credit Facility and US$1.4 billion under the new Resilience and Sustainability Facility. The IMF stated support package "will help preserve macroeconomic stability, protect the vulnerable and foster inclusive and green growth."

On 28 December 2022, Hasina opened the first phase of Dhaka Metro Rail, the country's first mass-rapid transit system from Uttara to Agargaon. However in doing so the nation's foreign debt crisis escalated.

During the 2023 G20 New Delhi summit, Hasina had a bilateral meeting with Indian prime minister Narendra Modi to discuss diversifying India-Bangladesh cooperation, including areas like connectivity and commercial linkages. She was accompanied by her daughter Saima Wazed, who is a candidate for a WHO election. The summit also provided an opportunity for Hasina to meet other global leaders and strengthen Bangladesh's bilateral ties.

=== Fifth term (2024) ===
In January 2024 Hasina won her fourth consecutive term when her party, the Awami League, won 224 of the 300 parliamentary seats amidst a low voter turnout in an election boycotted by the main opposition. She was inaugurated on 11 January.

In May 2024, Sheikh Hasina claimed that a "white country" was plotting to topple her government and claimed that she would be promised trouble-free elections in January if she allowed a "white country" to set up an airbase in Bangladesh. She also alleged that there was a conspiracy to create a Christian country on the lines of East Timor carved out of the territory of Bangladesh and Myanmar.

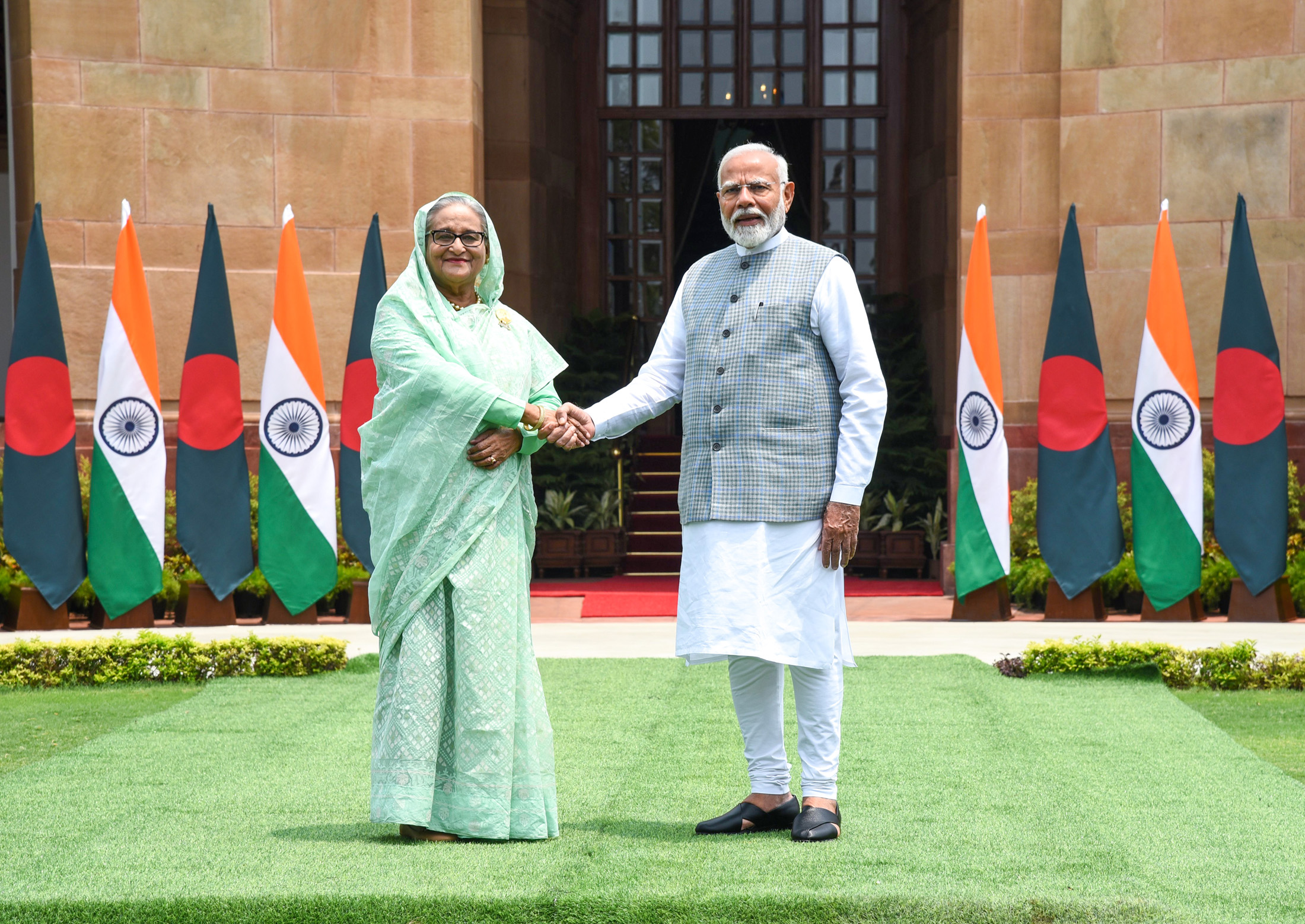
Hasina with Indian Prime Minister Narendra Modi in New Delhi in June 2024, just over a month before her ouster

In June 2024, Hasina visited India. and one month later she officially visited China upon invitation of its premier, Li Qiang. The close timing of those two visits was seen as an attempt to mediate between China and India.

In the same month of Hasina's state visit to China, protests broke out in support of reforming the quota system. In response, Hasina stated in a press conference,

If the grandchildren of freedom fighters don't get quota benefits, will those then go to the grandchildren of the Razakars? That's my question to the countrymen.

Protesters interpreted this as her referring to them as Razakars and adopted the title in some of their slogans. The protests later turned violent, involving police, the armed forces, and members of the Awami League, Chhatra League, and Jubo League, resulting in over 2,000 deaths and more than 20,000 injuries. The government then shut down internet access for all non-essential purposes, conducted a massive crackdown on protestors with the help of the armed forces, and imposed a curfew that lasted five days. The Supreme Court agreed to reform the quota system, but the protesters then demanded justice for those killed during the demonstrations and an official apology from Hasina and the resignation of certain ministers they believed were responsible for inciting violence. On 3 August, the protest organisers issued a single demand and announced a non-cooperation movement, calling for the resignation of Hasina and her entire cabinet.

=== Resignation and second exile ===
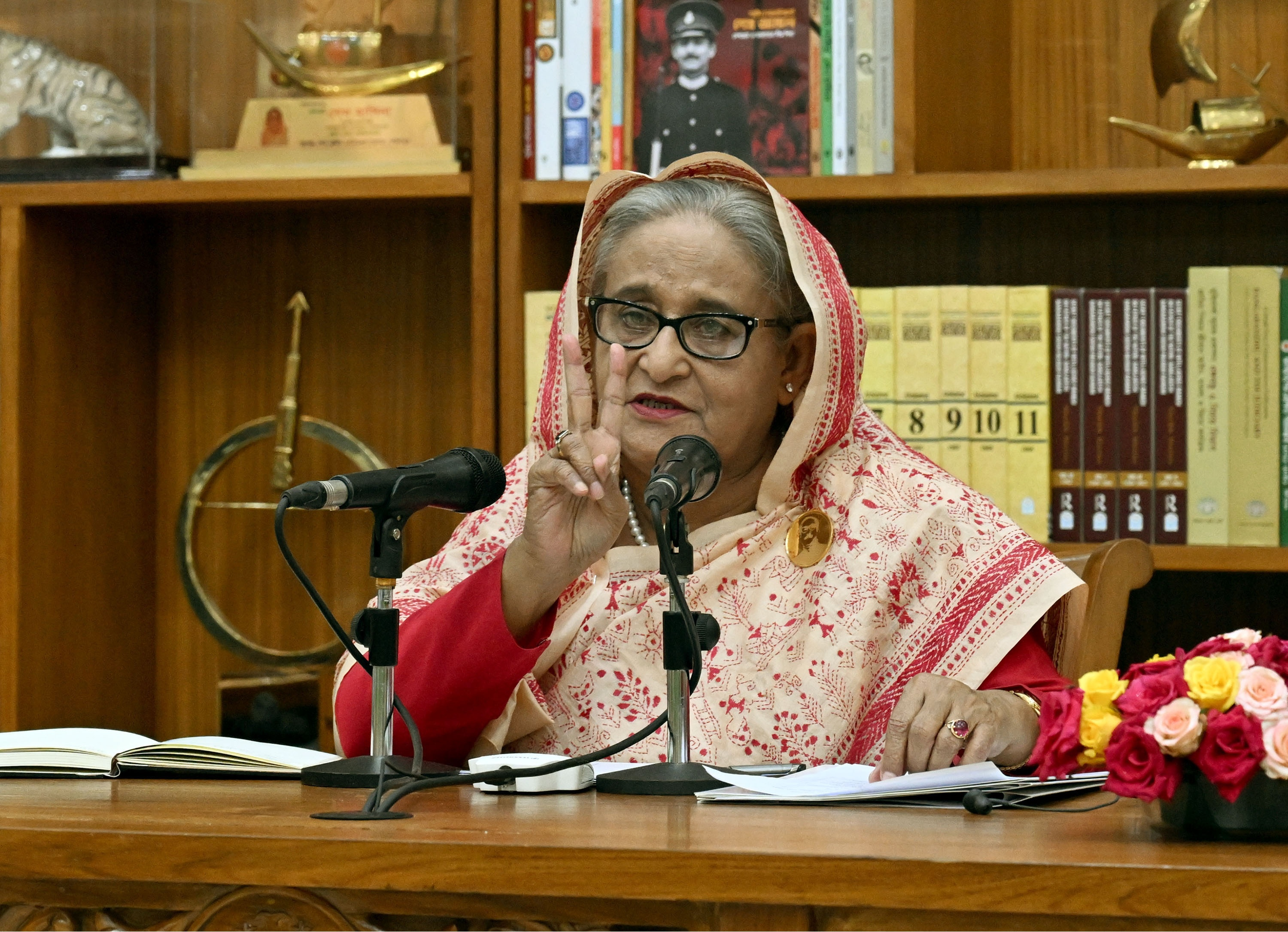
At this press conference on 14 July 2024, Sheikh Hasina linked the quota reform protesters to Razakars, drawing sharp criticism and further escalating the unrest that ultimately culminated in her resignation.

Hasina resigned on 5 August 2024, as large crowds of demonstrators surrounded the prime minister's residence. Her resignation was announced by General Waker-uz-Zaman, the chief of the Army Staff. Later that day, Hasina fled to India in a chaotic departure, first by car, then by helicopter, and finally by plane. She left without making a resignation speech.

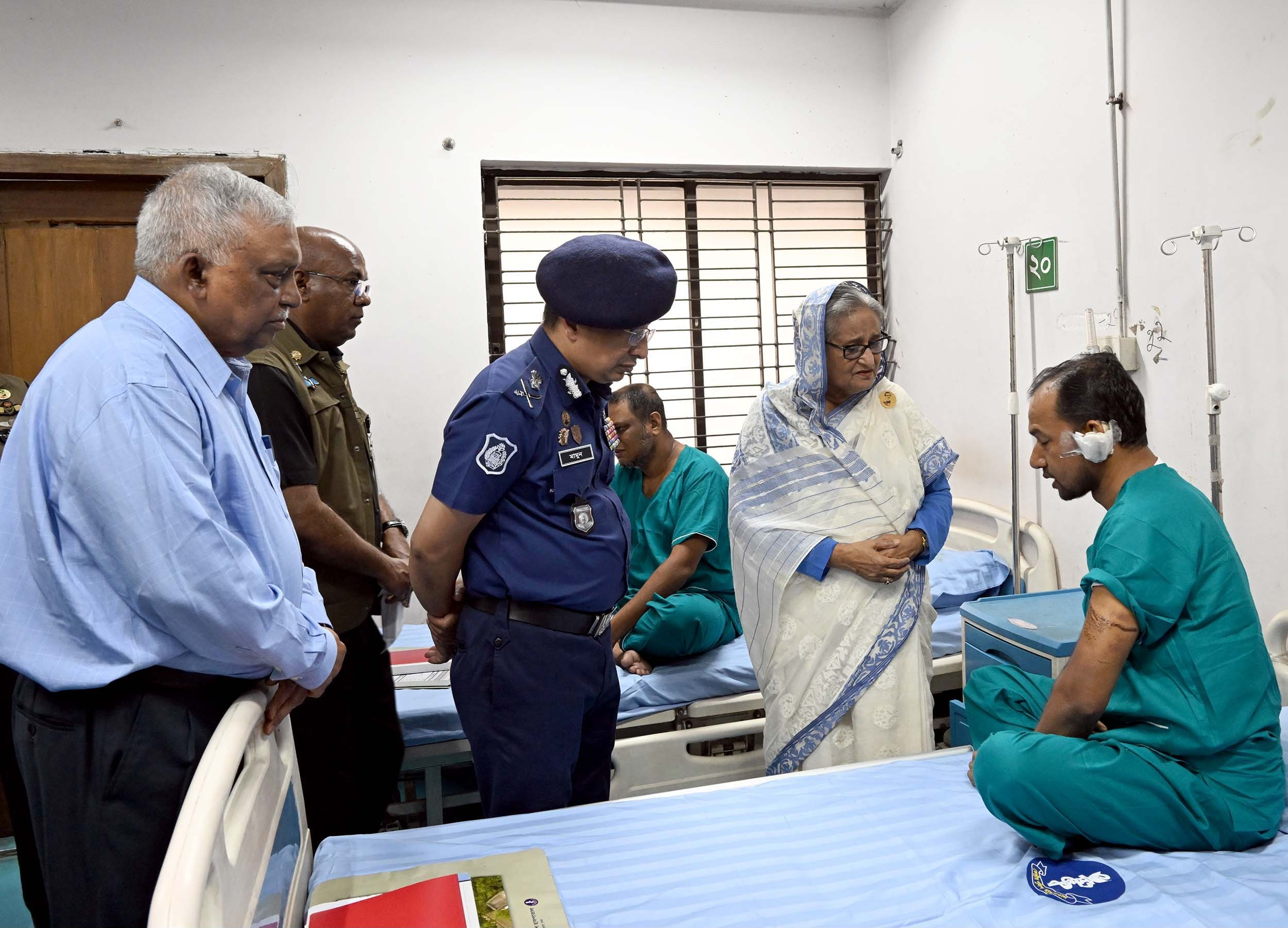
Sheikh Hasina, Asaduzzaman Khan, and Chowdhury Abdullah Al-Mamun visiting injured police officers at Rajarbag Police Hospital on 28 July 2024, following the violent suppression of protesters of the July Uprising. All three were later named in criminal cases related to the July massacre.

Hasina reportedly flew in a Bangladesh Air Force Lockheed C-130 transport to Hindon Air Force base in Ghaziabad, India, where she was received by the Indian national security advisor Ajit Doval along with other senior military officials. (Note: Multiple references: to India.) Indian foreign minister S. Jaishankar told the Parliament, "At very short notice, she requested approval to come for the moment to India." Her son, Sajeeb Wazed, initially said that she would not return to politics and planned to "stay in Delhi for a little while" before her next destination, but subsequently said on 7 August that she and the Awami League would remain active in the Bangladeshi political scene and that she would return to the country once elections were declared. He also insisted that Sheikh Hasina was still the prime minister, saying that she was unable to formally submit her resignation after being forced to flee from the protesters. Hasina had hoped to go to London, but the United Kingdom reportedly rebuffed initial overtures seeking political asylum. She reportedly considered seeking temporary residence in the United Arab Emirates, Saudi Arabia, Belarus, or Qatar. Because her nephew lives in Finland, that country was speculated as a possible destination. Although Sajeeb Wazed lives in the U.S., she is considered unlikely to seek asylum there, as the U.S. government criticised her rule in Bangladesh.

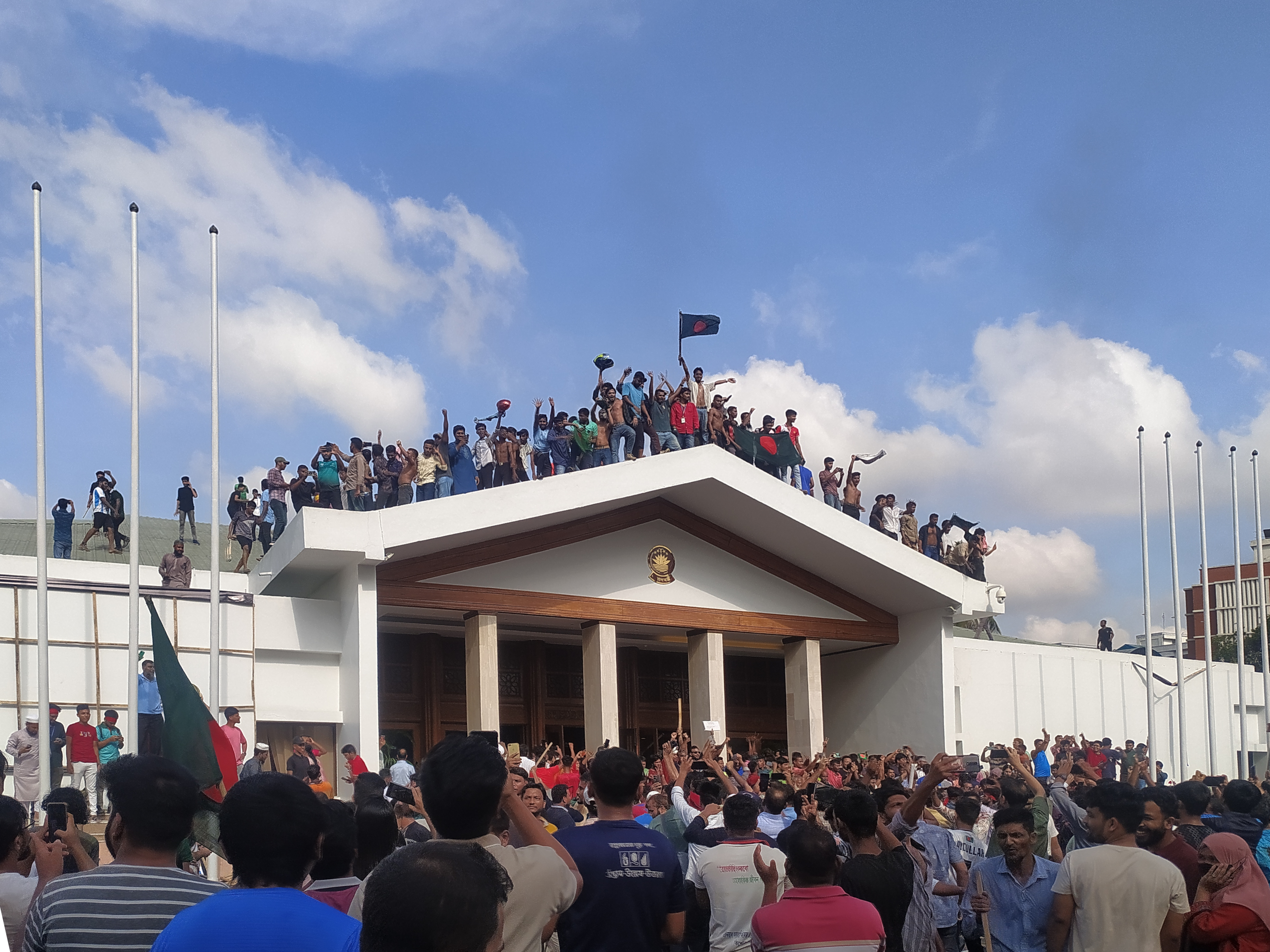
People cheering in front of the Prime Minister's Office, after Hasina's resignation

Hasina was living in a secret location in India under tight security as of August 2024. Sajeeb Wazed said that the protests which led to her resignation had support from a foreign intelligence agency, without naming any country. In a statement published in the Indian media on 11 August, she accused the United States of influencing her resignation, and previously accused the United States of conspiring to oust her in the Jatiya Sangsad. However, Wazed called the statement "false and fabricated" and said Hasina "did not give any statement before or after leaving Dhaka". The White House also denied allegations of any US involvement. On 13 August, Hasina released her first confirmed statements since her overthrow published by Wazed Joy calling for an investigation into the killings made during the protests, while insisting that police and the Awami League were also victims of "terrorist aggression".

== Post-premiership ==
As of 10 September 2024, Hasina is facing 152 cases which include 135 for murder, 7 for crimes against humanity and genocide, 3 for abduction, 6 for attempted murder and 1 for the attack on a BNP procession. These cases include other former government officials – Home Minister Asaduzzaman Khan, Transport and Bridges Minister and concurrent Awami League secretary-general Obaidul Quader, and others. The International Crimes Tribunal opened an investigation on charges of genocide and crimes against humanity against her and nine senior government and Awami League officials over their role in the crackdown on the protests following a petition by the father of a killed student. The BNP requested India to extradite Sheikh Hasina to Bangladesh for prosecution against the cases registered on her.

On 21 August, the interim government of Muhammad Yunus ordered the revocation of all diplomatic passports including Hasina's. On 29 August, the interim government issued an ordinance revoking a law providing special privileges to the Sheikh–Wazed family, including Sheikh Hasina, under which it was enacted in 2009. On 17 October, the International Crimes Tribunal issued an arrest warrant against her for alleged crimes against humanity committed during the July massacre. On 5 December, the tribunal banned her speeches and related broadcasts from being published in Bangladesh.

The presence of a large number of secret prison cells or aynaghars during Sheikh Hasina's 15 years was brought to the public eye by The Commission for Inquiry on Enforced Disappearance and was officially visited by Chief Adviser Muhammad Yunus with victims and press in February 2025. At least one detention centre, next to Dhaka International Airport, with many tiny, dark cells had been bricked up to hide it after the regime fell. 500 to 700 cells were found throughout the country. People were incarcerated sometimes for many years, and many are thought to have been killed.

A report titled White Paper on State of Bangladesh Economy, published on 1 December 2024, estimated that up to US$16 billion was annually diverted through money laundering during Sheikh Hasina's tenure as prime minister from 2009 to 2024, adding up to more than $240 billion over 15 years. In December 2024, the Bangladeshi government opened an investigation against Hasina, her son Sajeeb Wazed Joy, and her niece, Tulip Siddiq, who is an MP and was then a cabinet minister in the United Kingdom, over allegations of embezzlement of $5 billion in funds for the construction of the Rooppur Nuclear Power Plant using offshore accounts in Malaysia. On 24 December, the Bangladeshi government formally requested the Indian Ministry of External Affairs to extradite Hasina.

The Interim government has made the money laundering case of Sheikh Hasina and her family a top priority for resolution. On 11 March 2025, a Dhaka court ordered the freezing of 124 bank accounts of Sheikh Hasina, her family, related individuals and institutions which had Tk635.14 crore in them. It has also confiscated eight plots, which include 60-katha RAJUK plot with a deed value of Tk1.80 crore, as well as 10 decimal land holdings valued at Tk8.85 crore. On 18 March 2025, A court in Dhaka has issued an order to freeze another 31 bank accounts connected to Sheikh Hasina, her son Sajeeb Wazed Joy, daughter Saima Wazed Putul, sister Sheikh Rehana, and their affiliates. The total amount held in these accounts is Tk394.6 crore. A joint probe team found assets of Sheikh Hasina, her family, related individuals and institutions in United States, United Kingdom, Malaysia, Singapore, Hong Kong and Cayman Islands. Existence of a Russian slush fund was found in a bank of Malaysia.

On 1 June 2025, the International Crimes Tribunal began trying Sheikh Hasina in absentia for the repression of protests against her government. On 2 July 2025, she was sentenced in absentia by the ICT to six months' imprisonment for contempt of court.

A leaked audio recording, verified by the BBC, reveals that Hasina authorised lethal force against student-led protesters during 2024, reportedly resulting in up to 1,400 deaths. The unrest, sparked by opposition to civil service job quotas, escalated into a mass uprising that ultimately ousted Hasina after 15 years in power. In the verified call, Hasina is heard instructing security forces to shoot protesters on sight, a directive corroborated by subsequent police use of military-grade weapons across Dhaka. The recording, authenticated through forensic analysis and matched to Hasina's voice, is now being used as key evidence in her trial in absentia for crimes against humanity. While her Awami League party denies any unlawful intent and questions the tape's authenticity, legal experts emphasise the recording's evidentiary significance in linking Hasina directly to the violent crackdown.

On 17 November 2025, Hasina was convicted of crimes against humanity by Bangladesh's International Crimes Tribunal, on charges including delivering inflammatory speech and ordering the use of lethal force against protesters during the July Uprising, and sentenced to death in absentia. She stated the trial was a "farce trial" driven by a "political vendetta". The Office of the United Nations High Commissioner for Human Rights (OHCHR) opposed the death penalty, while the Human Rights Watch stated she and Asaduzzaman Khan were "prosecuted in absentia, not represented by counsel of their choosing, and sentenced to death, raising serious human rights concerns."

On 27 November 2025, Hasina was convicted and sentenced to 21 years' imprisonment for illegally securing plots of land in Purbachal for herself and her family.

In August 2026, Hasina announced her plan to return to Bangladesh by the end of the year.

== Reception ==
The Padma Bridge graft scandal involved the ruling Awami League government that allegedly sought, in exchange for the awarding of the construction contract, a large amount of money from the Canadian construction company SNC-Lavalin. A Canadian court subsequently dismissed the case, after the wiretap evidence was excluded from the case.

As a result of the allegations, the World Bank pulled out of a project to provide funding for the Padma Bridge, citing corruption concerns, cancelling ৳10241.346 crore (US$830 million) of credit for the 6-kilometre-long (3.7 mi) road-rail bridge over the Padma River. One of the individuals implicated was Minister of Communications Syed Abul Hossain who subsequently resigned and was later acquitted of any wrongdoing. On 11 July 2012, BNP General-Secretary Mirza Fakhrul Islam Alamgir said the Awami League government should make public a letter sent by the World Bank, wherein the bank brought graft charges against Hasina and three other figures. On 17 January 2016, Hasina stated that a managing director of a bank in the United States provoked the World Bank to cancel the loan. The bridge was eventually constructed with the government's own funds and was inaugurated in June 2022 at a cost of ৳30193.39 crore (US$2.5 billion), much higher than the original projected cost of ৳10161.75 crore (US$830 million).

On 24 January 2017, in a speech in parliament, Prime Minister Hasina blamed Muhammad Yunus for the World Bank's pulling out of the project. According to her, Yunus lobbied with the former United States secretary of state Hillary Clinton to persuade the World Bank to terminate the loan. On 10 February 2017, a justice of the Superior Court of Ontario dismissed the bribery-conspiracy case for lack of any evidence.

In 2018, Hasina's government passed the controversial Digital Security Act, 2018, under which any criticism deemed inappropriate by the government over the internet or any other media could be punished by prison terms of various degrees. This was heavily criticised both domestically and internationally for suppressing people's freedom of speech, as well as undermining press freedom in Bangladesh.

In December 2022, the Hasina government ordered the closure of 191 websites accused of publishing "anti-state news" citing intelligence reports. Dhaka district authorities ordered the closure of Dainik Dinkal, which is owned by Tarique Rahman of the Bangladesh Nationalist Party (BNP). Dainik Dinkal appealed the order to the Bangladesh Press Council who dismissed their appeal in February 2022, resulting in its closure. The move has been criticised by government opponents who claim the move is an attempt to stifle opposition to the government. The government claimed Dainik Dinkal violated articles 10, 11, 16, 21(1)(kha) of the Printing Presses and Publications (Declaration and Registration) Act, 1973 as it had irregular publication and its publisher was a convicted felon.

In June 2024, Sheikh Hasina paid a state visit to New Delhi, during which Bangladesh and India signed ten bilateral agreements, including one on allowing India a rail corridor to its northeastern states through Bangladeshi territory. This led to widespread criticism in Bangladesh on the issue of the country's sovereignty, accusing Hasina of "selling the country to India".

Domestically, Hasina has been criticised as being too close to India, often at the cost of Bangladesh's sovereignty. She is seen by her critics as a manifestation of India's interference in Bangladeshi politics, which they have described as the main source of her power.

== Personal life ==
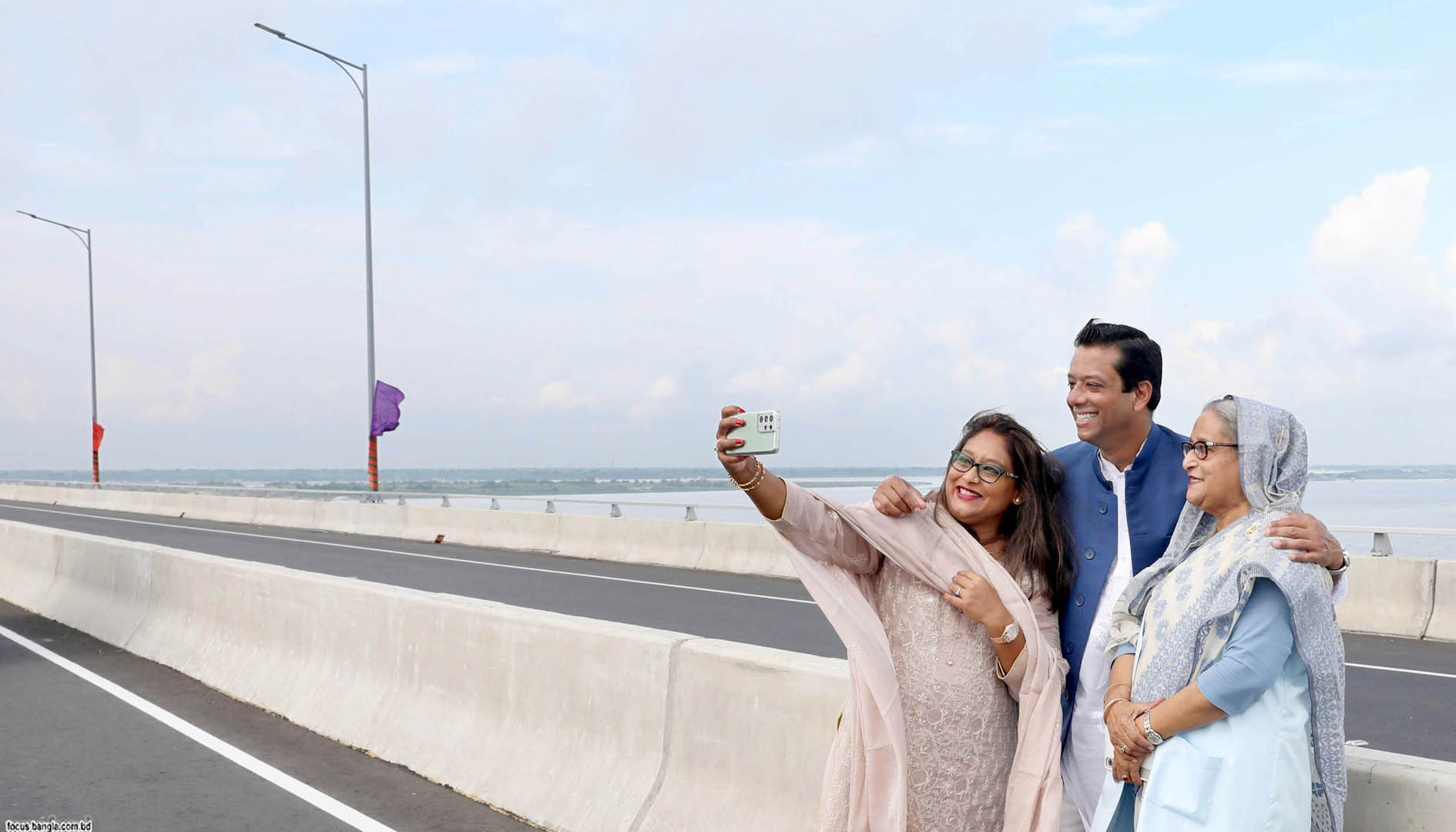
Hasina with her daughter Saima and son Joy, visiting the Padma Bridge in 2022.

In 1968, Hasina married M. A. Wazed Miah (1942–2009), a Bangladeshi physicist, writer, and chairman of the Bangladesh Atomic Energy Commission. After her marriage, she adopted the name Wazed from her husband's name. (Note: After her marriage, her passport name was Hasina Sheikh Wazed.) They have a son, Sajeeb Wazed Joy, and a daughter, Saima Wazed. Saima's father-in-law is a former minister of Expatriates' Welfare and Overseas Employment and LGRD, Khandaker Mosharraf Hossain. Hasina's only living sibling, Sheikh Rehana, served as the adviser of Tungipara upazila unit Awami League in Gopalganj in 2017. Hasina's niece (and Sheikh Rehana's daughter) is Tulip Siddiq, a British Labour Party politician and elected Member of Parliament. Siddiq was City Minister but has since resigned.

Sheikh Hasina has survived a total of 19 assassination attempts. She experiences hearing loss as a result of injuries sustained during the 2004 grenade attack. Given the history of assassination of the Sheikh Mujib family in 1975, and later attempts to assassinate Sheikh Hasina and very high security risk towards the immediate Mujib family members, in 2015, she and her children were given lifelong protection by the government of Bangladesh through the Special Security Force. Practice of extending such security protection is not rare for persons with high security risk to their lives. The government also announced free utilities (fuel, water, telephone) and medical treatment for life for her and her family. However, the interim government decided to cancel this law. Then on 9 September 2024, an ordinance was issued that repealed this law.

== Honours and awards ==
=== Honorary doctorates ===
- Degree of Doctor of Law by the Boston University on 6 February 1997.
- Honorary Doctor of Law by the Waseda University of Japan on 4 July 1997.
- Honorary Doctorate of Philosophy in Liberal Arts by the University of Abertay Dundee on 25 October 1997.
- Honorary Degree of 'Desikottama' (Doctor of Literature, honoris causa) by the Visva-Bharati University of India on 28 January 1999.
- Doctor of Law (honoris causa), by the Australian National University on 20 October 1999. (Revocation under review)
- Honorary Doctor of Law by the University of Dhaka on 18 December 1999.
- Honorary Doctor of Humane Letters by University of Bridgeport on 5 September 2000.
- Doctor of Literature (honoris causa) by the Tripura University in January 2012.
- Doctor of the University (Honorary) by the Sher-e-Bangla Agricultural University on 16 November 2015.
- Doctor of Letters (Honorary) by the Kazi Nazrul University, West Bengal, India on 26 May 2018.

=== Awards ===
- Foreign Policy magazine named her as one of the world's leading global thinkers in 2019.
- Planet 50–50 champion by UN Women.
- Agent of Change Award by Global Partnership Forum.
- Included on the Time 100 list in 2018.
- 59th place on Forbes' list of 100 most powerful women in the world.
- The Félix Houphouët-Boigny Peace Prize by the UNESCO for 1998.
- Mother Teresa Award by the All India Peace Council in 1998.
- M.K. Gandhi Award for 1998 by the Mahatma M K Gandhi Foundation of Oslo, Norway.
- Awarded Medal of Distinction in 1996–97 and 1998–99 and Head of State Medal in 1996–97 by the Lions Clubs International.
- The Ceres Medal by the Food and Agriculture Organization for 1999.
- The Pearl S. Buck Award by the Randolph College on 9 April 2000.
- Named Paul Harris Fellow by the Rotary Foundation.
- Indira Gandhi Prize for 2009.
- UNESCO Peace Tree award for her commitment to women's empowerment and girl's education in 2014.
- UN environment prize for leadership on climate change.
- Recipient of the Lifetime Achievement Award (Champions of the Earth) in 2015.

== In popular culture ==
- Hasina appears in the 2018 docudrama Hasina: A Daughter's Tale, directed by Rezaur Rahman Khan Piplu.
- On 1 February 2021, Hasina was referred in Al Jazeera's 64-minute documentary All the Prime Minister's Men.
- On 28 September 2021, Khoka Theke Bangabandhu Jatir Pita, an animated biopic of Sheikh Mujibur Rahman was released where Sheikh Hasina was also portrayed.
- On 1 October 2021, another animated film named Mujib Amar Pita about Sheikh Mujibur Rahman was released which also included Sheikh Hasina. The film was based on Hasina's book Sheikh Mujib Amar Pita.
- On 26 October 2023, Amader Choto Russel Shona, an animated film about Sheikh Russel, was released where Sheikh Hasina was portrayed as elder sister of Russel. She also wrote the screenplay of the movie.
- On 17 November 2023, Hasina appears giving interview about the Assassination of Sheikh Mujibur Rahman in The Assassin Next Door, an episode of Canadian documentary series The Fifth Estate.

== Electoral history ==
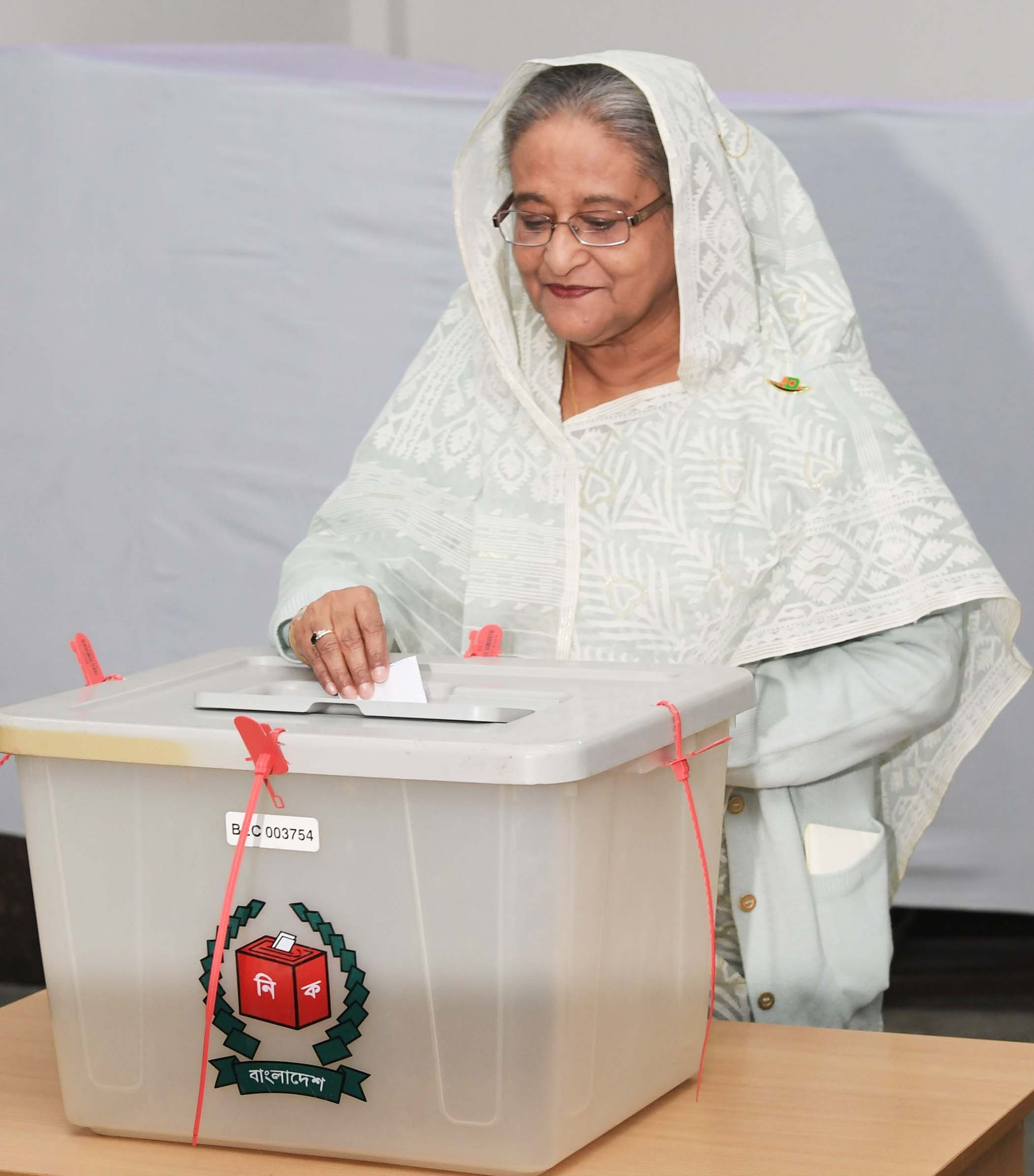
Hasina casting her vote in the 2018 general election—often referred to as the “midnight election”—which was widely regarded by international observers as unfair and marred by irregularities.

Year	Constituency	Party	Votes	%	Result
1991	Dhaka-7	Awami League	49,362	36.5	Lost
1991	Dhaka-10	Awami League	29,451	37.8	Lost
1991	Gopalganj-3	Awami League	67,945	72.2	Won
June 1996	Bagerhat-1	Awami League	77,342	51.4	Won
June 1996	Khulna-1	Awami League	62,247	53.5	Won
June 1996	Gopalganj-3	Awami League	102,689	92.2	Won
2001	Rangpur-6	Awami League	77,991	44.6	Lost
2001	Gopalganj-3	Awami League	154,130	94.7	Won
2001	Narail-1	Awami League	78,216	54.6	Won
2001	Narail-2	Awami League	97,195	50.3	Won
2001	Barguna-3	Awami League	55,030	52.5	Won
2008	Rangpur-6	Awami League	170,542	80.0	Won
2008	Bagerhat-1	Awami League	142,979	68.3	Won
2008	Gopalganj-3	Awami League	158,958	97.1	Won
2014	Rangpur-6	Awami League	148,624	96.8	Won
2014	Gopalganj-3	Awami League	187,185	98.7	Won
2018	Gopalganj-3	Awami League	229,539	99.9	Won
2024	Gopalganj-3	Awami League	249,962	99.4	Won

== Bibliography ==
1. সাদা কালো (Black and White)
2. Democracy in Distress Demeaned Humanity
3. শেখ রাসেল (Sheikh Rasel)
4. আমরা জনগণের কথা বলতে এসেছি (We Came Here to Speak for the People)
5. আন্তর্জাতিক সম্পর্ক উন্নয়নে শেখ হাসিনা (Sheikh Hasina on Developing International relations)
6. Living in Tears
7. রচনাসমগ্র ১
8. রচনাসমগ্র ২
9. সামরিকতন্ত্র বনাম গণতন্ত্র (Militarism versus Democracy)
10. Development for the Masses
11. Democracy Poverty Elimination and Peace
12. বিপন্ন গণতন্ত্র লাঞ্চিত মানবতা (Endangered Democracy, Oppressed Humanity)
13. জনগণ এবং গণতন্ত্র (People and democracy)
14. সহেনা মানবতার অবমাননা (Can't Tolerate the Insults of Humanity)
15. ওরা টোকাই কেন (Why They Are Dumpster Diving)
16. বাংলাদেশে স্বৈরতন্ত্রের জন্ম (The Birth of Autocracy in Bangladesh)
17. বাংলাদেশ জাতীয় সংসদে বঙ্গবন্ধু শেখ মুজিবুর রহমান (Sheikh Mujib in Bangladesh Parliament)
18. শেখ মুজিব আমার পিতা (Sheikh Mujib: My Father)
19. সবুজ মাঠ পেরিয়ে (Beyond the Green Field)
20. দারিদ্র দূরীকরণে কিছু চিন্তাভাবনা (Few Thoughts on Eradicating Poverty)
21. বিশ্ব প্রামান্য ঐতিহ্যে বঙ্গবন্ধুর ভাষণ
22. নির্বাচিত ১০০ ভাষণ (Selected 100 speeches)
23. নির্বাচিত প্রবন্ধ (Selected Essay)
24. The Quest for Vision 2021 – 1st Part
25. The Quest for Vision 2021 – 2nd Part
26. Muktidata Sheikh Mujib (Bengali: মুক্তিদাতা শেখ মুজিব) (Preface)

== See also ==
- List of heads of the executive by approval rating

== Citations ==
=== References ===
Party political offices
Preceded by Abdul Malek Ukil	President of the Awami League; 1981–present	Incumbent
Political offices
Preceded by Asaduzzaman Khan	Leader of the Opposition; 1986–1988	Succeeded by A. S. M. Abdur Rab
Preceded by A. S. M. Abdur Rab	Leader of the Opposition; 1991–1996	Vacant Title next held by Khaleda Zia
Preceded by Muhammad Habibur Rahman as Acting prime minister	Prime Minister of Bangladesh; 1996–2001	Succeeded by Latifur Rahman as Acting prime minister
Preceded by Khaleda Zia	Leader of the Opposition; 2001–2006	Succeeded by Khaleda Zia
Preceded by Fakhruddin Ahmed as Acting prime minister	Prime Minister of Bangladesh; 2009–2024	Succeeded by Muhammad Yunus as Chief adviser
Jatiya Sangsad
Preceded by Kazi Firoz Rashid	Member of Parliament for Gopalganj-3; 1991–1996	Succeeded by Mujibur Rahman Howlader
Preceded by Mujibur Rahman Howlader	Member of Parliament for Gopalganj-3; 1996–2024	Vacant
Preceded by Khaleda Zia	Leader of the House; 1996–2001	Succeeded by Khaleda Zia
Preceded by Khaleda Zia	Leader of the House; 2009–2024	Vacant
