= 2024 state visit by Sheikh Hasina to China =

Visit by Prime Minister of Bangladesh

- Date: July 8–10, 2024
- Venue: Beijing
- Organised by: Government of Bangladesh; Government of China

At the invitation of Premier of China Li Qiang, Sheikh Hasina, the prime minister of Bangladesh, paid an official visit to China from July 8 to 10, 2024.

In June, Hasina had visited India. So this visit to China is also seen as her attempt to seek opportunities to mediate between China and India.

== Background ==
On June 24, Hasina met in Dhaka with Liu Jianchao, minister of the International Department of the Chinese Communist Party, who led a delegation to Bangladesh.

On July 4, Chinese Foreign Ministry spokesperson Mao Ning said at a regular press conference that the visit is Hasina's first visit to China since she started her new term. The two leaders will have an in-depth exchange of views on deepening traditional friendship, expanding mutually beneficial cooperation and international and regional issues of common concern. Hasina will also attend the China-Bangladesh Business Trade and Investment Conference.

== Itinerary ==
Hasina arrived at the Beijing Capital International Airport on July 8, 2024.

On July 9, Hasina called on the president of the Asian Infrastructure Investment Bank (AIIB), Jin Liqun, for extending the cooperation and investment matters. Then, Hasina attended the Bangladesh-China Summit on "Trade, Business and Investment Opportunities" at the China International Exhibition Center of the Shangri-La Hotel in Beijing. In the afternoon, she met with Wang Huning, the chairman of the National Committee of the Chinese People's Political Consultative Conference (CPPCC), in Beijing. The Premier then laid a wreath at the Monument to the People's Heroes in Tiananmen Square.

On the morning of July 10, Premier Li Qiang held talks at the Great Hall of the People in Beijing with Hasina. After the talks, the two premiers witnessed the signing of a number of bilateral cooperation documents in the fields of policy exchanges, economy, trade and investment, digital economy, inspection and quarantine, healthcare, education and media. The two sides announced the completion of the joint feasibility study on China-Bangladesh FTA and agreed to start negotiations on upgrading the China–Bangladesh Investment Agreement. The two sides agreed to designate 2025 as the "Year of China-Bangladesh Humanities Exchange". In the afternoon, General Secretary of the Chinese Communist Party Xi Jinping met with Hasina at the Great Hall of the People. The two leaders announced the upgrading of China-Bangladesh relations to a "comprehensive strategic partnership". The two sides positively commented on the completion of the Bangabandhu Sheikh Mujibur Rahman Tunnel under the Karnaphuli River, modernization of the communication network, the Bangladesh Government Infrastructure Network Phase III project, the Single Point Mooring and Twin Line Pipeline projects. Both sides expressed satisfaction over the progress of major projects of China-Bangladesh cooperation such as Padma Bridge Railway Link, expansion and upgrading of Dhaka District Grid System, Grid Enhancement Project of Bangladesh Electricity Grid Corporation (BEGC), Dhaka–Ashulia Elevated Expressway, Rajshahi Surface Water Treatment Plant, etc.

At 10 a.m. on the morning of July 11, she led the delegation back to Bangladesh.

== Outcomes ==
On July 10, 20 cooperation agreements were signed and new projects were launched. During the visit, Chinese Premier Li Qiang announced $1 billion in economic assistance, and Hasina invited China to increase its investment in Bangladesh's Special Economic Zones (SEZs) and Bangabandhu Industrial Park (BIP), where an Export Processing Zone (EPZ) has been allocated exclusively for Chinese investors.

Bangladesh plans to negotiate a loan of about $5 billion with China to boost the country's dwindling foreign exchange reserves. The money will be denominated in Renminbi and will provide exporters with access to finance to pay for much-needed raw materials imported from China. But the two sides did not reach an agreement on the deal at the talks.

On July 13, Hasina said in Dhaka that although China is willing to participate in the Teesta River project, Bangladesh is still handing over the project to India due to geopolitical considerations.

== See also ==
- List of international prime ministerial trips made by Sheikh Hasina
