= List of international prime ministerial trips made by Sheikh Hasina =

The following is a list of international prime ministerial trips made by Sheikh Hasina during her second, third, fourth and fifth terms as Prime Minister of Bangladesh from 2009 to 5th August 2024, as well as visits made during her first term between 1996 and 2001.

== 1996 ==
	Country	Location	Date(s)	Details
1	China	Beijing	12–17 September	Official Visit: Hasina met with President Jiang Zemin and Premier Li Peng. The governments of Bangladesh and China signed several accords. (Note: This was the first foreign visit made Hasina since taking office as Prime Minister in June 1996.)
2	India	New Delhi	10–12 December	Official Visit: Hasina met with Indian Prime Minister H. D. Deve Gowda. Two signed the historic Ganges Water Sharing Treaty in the Hyderabad House, which paved the solution for the decades-long Ganges water dispute.

== 1997 ==
	Country	Location	Date(s)	Details
3	Pakistan	Islamabad	22–24 March	Official Visit: Hasina attended the 1st Extraordinary Session of the Organization of Islamic Cooperation.

== 2000 ==
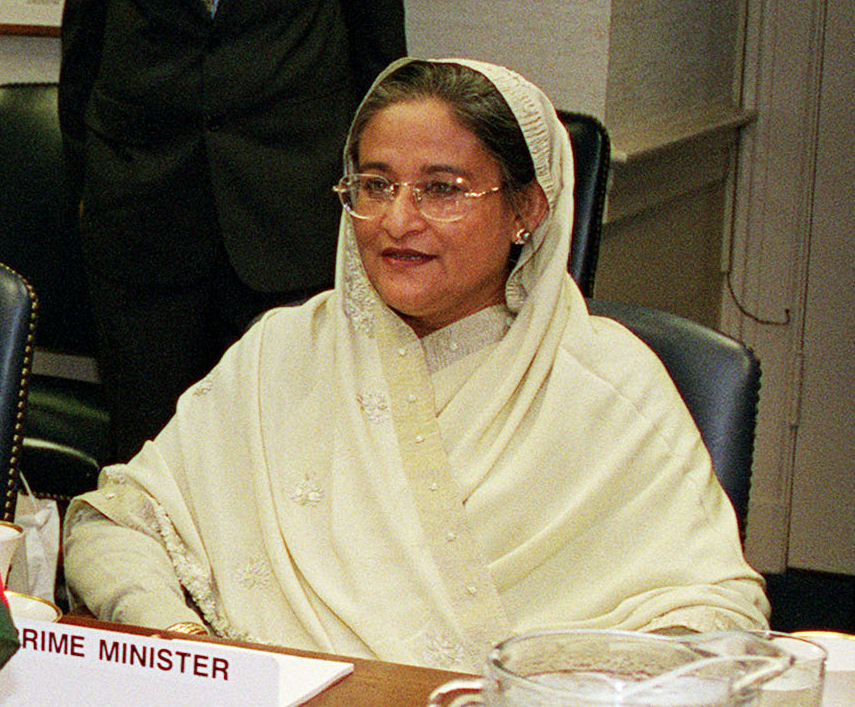
Hasina in the Pentagon in 2000

Country	Areas Visited	Date(s)	Purpose(s)	Notes
Belgium	Brussels	1–2 February	Official Visit	Hasina signed a cooperation agreement with the European Union.
United States	Washington DC	16–19 October	Official Visit	Hasina met with President Bill Clinton at the White House.

== 2009 ==
Country	Areas Visited	Date(s)	Purpose(s)	Notes
Saudi Arabia	Jeddah	20–25 April	Official Visit	Hasina met with King Abdullah of Saudi Arabia and performed Umrah.
Trinidad and Tobago	Port of Spain	2009	Official visit	Bangladesh & Trinidad have shown interest in expanding the bilateral economic ties & have been cooperating each other.
Egypt	Sharm el-Sheikh	15–16 July	Official Visit	Hasina attended the 15th Summit of the Non-Aligned Movement.
Bhutan	Thimphu	5–9 November	Official Visit	This was Hasina's first visit to a SAARC country since being elected Prime Minister in 2008.

== 2010 ==
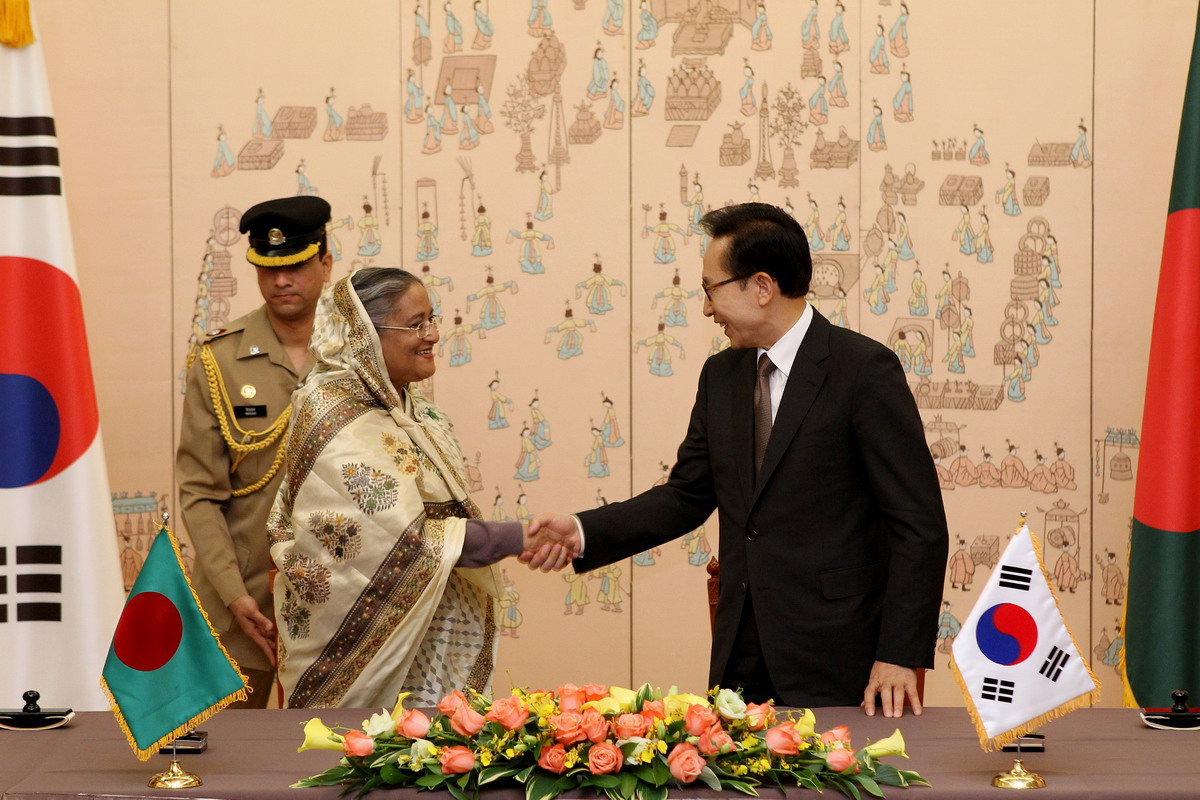
Sheikh Hasina with South Korean President Lee Myung-Bak during the Korea-Bangladesh Summit on 18 May 2010.

Country	Areas Visited	Date(s)	Purpose(s)	Notes
South Korea	Seoul	18 May	Official Visit	Hasina met with President Lee Myung-Bak at the Blue House.

== 2011 ==
Country	Areas Visited	Date(s)	Purpose(s)	Notes
Germany	Berlin	25 October	Official Visit	Hasina held discussions with Chancellor Angela Merkel.
Myanmar	Yangon	5–7 December	Official Visit	Hasina met with President Thein Sein at the Presidential Palace. They discussed the Rohingya conflict.
Indonesia	Bali	9 December	Official Visit	Hasina attended the Bali Democracy Forum.

== 2012 ==
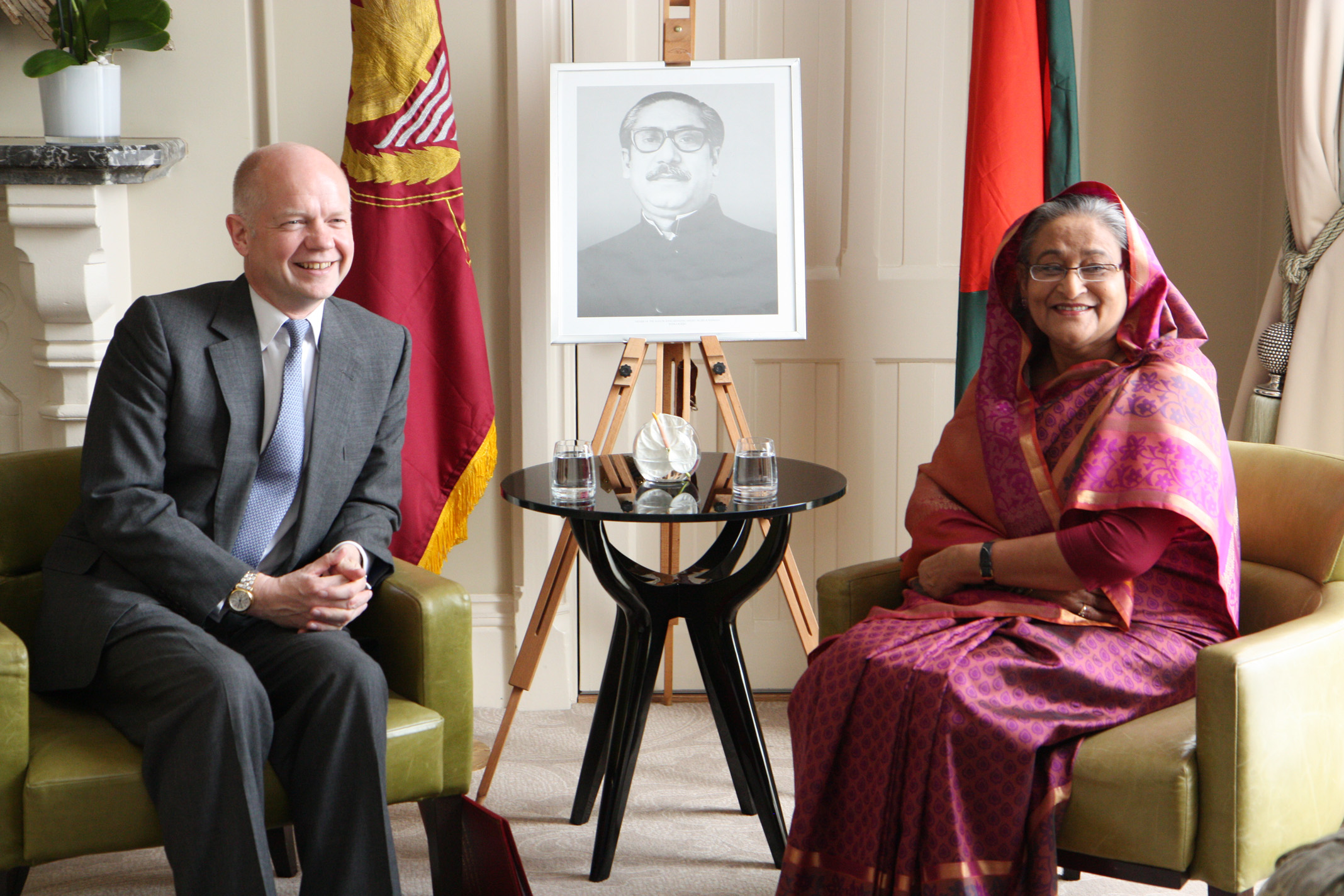
British Foreign Secretary William Hague meeting Sheikh Hasina in London 28 July 2012.

Country	Areas Visited	Date(s)	Purpose(s)	Notes
Turkey	Ankara	11–13 April	State visit	Hasina met with President Abdullah Gul and Prime Minister Recep Tayyip Erdogan. She met with Turkish business leaders and gave a lecture at Ankara University. The governments of Bangladesh and Turkey signed six agreements.
United Kingdom	London	24–29 July	Official Visit	Hasina attended the opening ceremony of the 2012 Summer Olympics.
Iran	Tehran	26–31 August	16th Summit of the Non-Aligned Movement	Hasina attended the 16th Summit of the Non-Aligned Movement. She met with Supreme Leader Ali Khamenei and President Mahmoud Ahmedinejad.
Vietnam	Hanoi	3 November	Official Visit	Hasina met with Prime Minister Nguyen Tan Dung.
Laos	Vientiane	4 November	Official Visit	Hasina met with President Choummaly Sayasone and Prime Minister Thongsing Thammavong. She attended the 9th Asia-Europe Meeting Summit and signed an agreement with Laos.

== 2013 ==
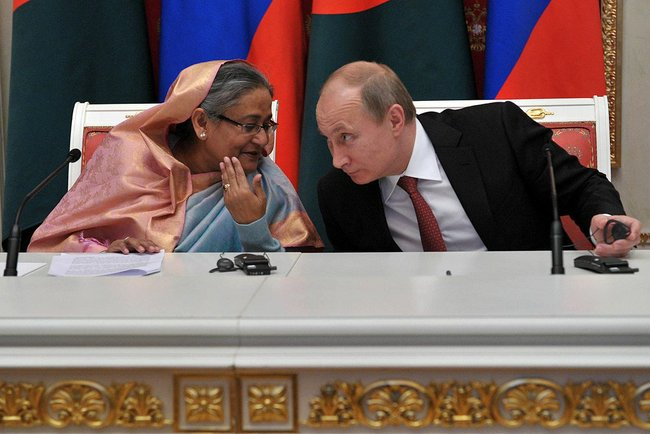
Sheikh Hasina with Russian President Vladimir Putin during her visit to Kremlin on 15 January 2013.

Country	Areas Visited	Date(s)	Purpose(s)	Notes
Russia	Moscow	14–16 January	State Visit	Hasina met with President Vladimir Putin at the Kremlin. Her government signed seven agreements with Russia, including an agreement for Russia to develop the Rooppur Nuclear Power Plant in Bangladesh. A US$1 billion arms deal was signed with Russia.
Thailand	Bangkok	19 May	Official Visit	Hasina attended the Second Asia Pacific Water Summit.

== 2014 ==
Country	Areas Visited	Date(s)	Purpose(s)	Notes
Japan	Tokyo	25–28 May	Official Visit	Hasina attended the Japan-Bangladesh summit. She met with Prime Minister Shinzo Abe.
China	Beijing	10 June	Official Visit	Hasina met with President Xi Jinping at the Great Hall of the People.
Malaysia	Kuala Lumpur	3 December	Official Visit	Hasina met with Prime Minister Najib Razak at Seri Perdana. The governments of Bangladesh and Malaysia signed four memoranda of understanding.

== 2015 ==
Country	Areas Visited	Date(s)	Purpose(s)	Notes
Netherlands	Amsterdam	3–6 November	Official Visit	Hasina signed four agreements with the Netherlands.

== 2016 ==
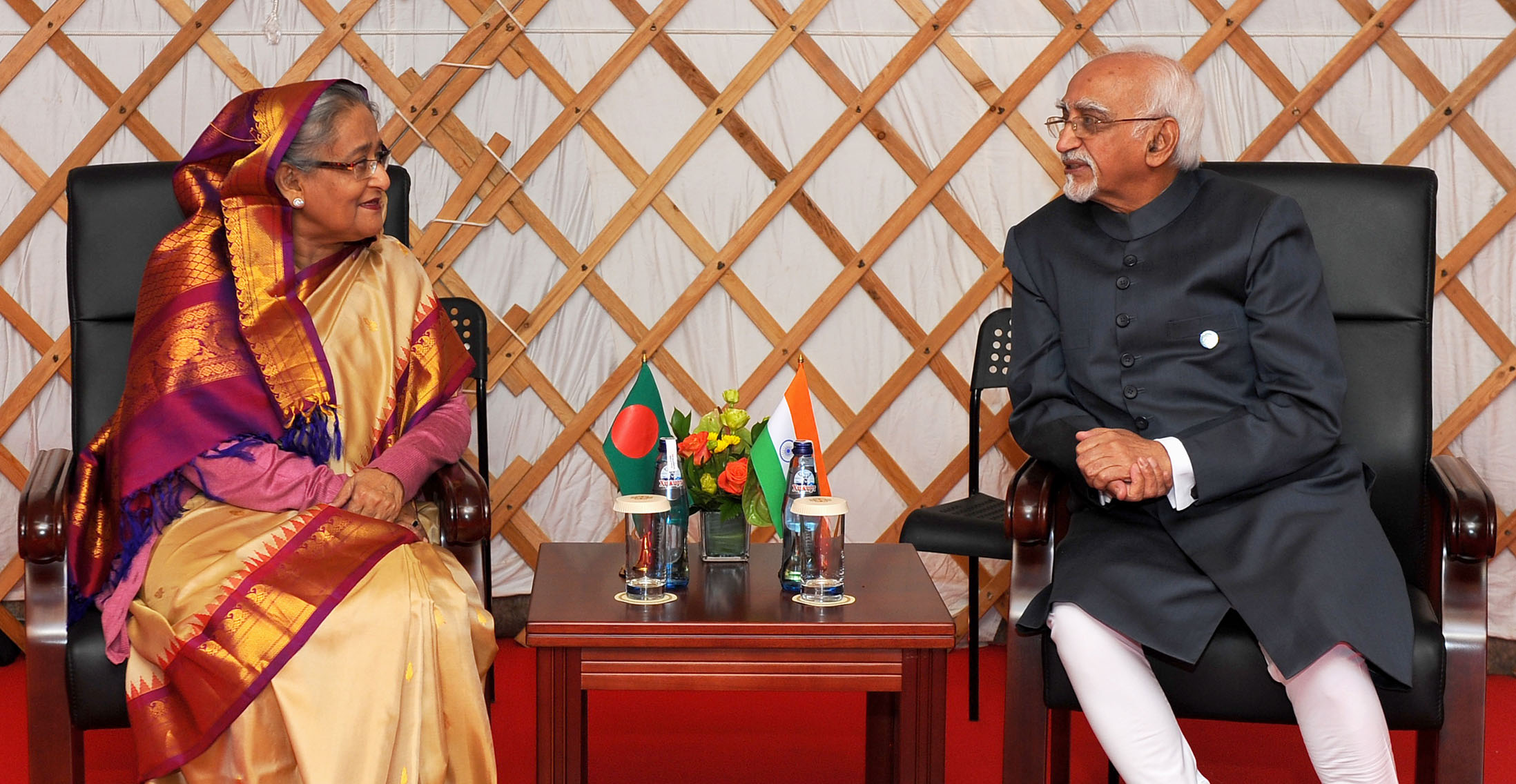
Sheikh Hasina in a bilateral meeting with Indian Vice-President Hamid Ansari during the 11th ASEM summit in Ulaanbaatar, Mongolia.

Country	Areas Visited	Date(s)	Purpose(s)	Notes
Canada	Montreal	17 September	Official Visit	Sheikh Hasina attended the Fifth Replenishment Conference of the Global Fund on invitation of Prime Minister Justin Trudeau.
Morocco	Marrakech	14–17 November	Official Visit	Hasina attended the 22nd Conference of the Parties.
Hungary	Budapest	1–3 December	Official Visit	Hasina attended the Budapest Water Summit 2016.

== 2017 ==
Country	Areas Visited	Date(s)	Purpose(s)	Notes
India	Delhi	7–10 April	State Visit	
Bhutan	Thimphu	18–20 April	State Visit	Hasina signed an agreement on in-land water transport.
Saudi Arabia	Riyadh	21 May	State Visit	Hasina attended the Arab Islamic-American Summit.
Austria	Vienna	29 May	Official Visit	Hasina met with Chancellor Christian Kern and President Alexander Van der Bellen. She attended the International Atomic Energy Agency conference.
Sweden	Stockholm	15–16 June	Official Visit	Hasina discussed migration, human rights, and cooperation with Prime Minister Stefan Löfven.
Cambodia	Phnom Penh	4 December	Official Visit	Hasina met King Norodom Sihamoni at Khemarin Palace.
France	Paris	12 December	State Visit	Hasina met with President Emmanuel Macron at the Élysée Palace. She attended the One Planet summit.

== 2018 ==
Country	Areas Visited	Date(s)	Purpose(s)	Notes
Singapore	Singapore	11–14 March	Official Visit	Hasina spoke at the Bangladesh-Singapore Business Forum.
Australia	Sydney	26–29 April	Official Visit	Hasina attended the International Convention Centre and was awarded the Global Women's Leadership Award.
Canada	Montreal	17 September	Official Visit	On the invitation of Prime Minister Justin Trudeau, Hasina attended the G7 outreach leaders programme meeting. She later held a tête-à-tête with Trudeau.
United States	New York City	23 September	State Visit	Hasina attended the 73rd session of the United Nations General Assembly.

== 2019 ==
Country	Areas Visited	Date(s)	Purpose(s)	Notes
Germany	Munich	14–16 February	Official Visit	Hasina attended the Munich Security Conference.
Brunei	Bandar Seri Begawan	21–23 April	State Visit	Hasina met with Sultan Hassanal Bolkiah at the Istana Nurul Iman. Six memorandums of understanding were signed between the governments of Bangladesh and Brunei.
Japan	Tokyo	28–31 May	State Visit	Hasina met with Prime Minister Shinzo Abe. She met with top Japanese business leaders and was the keynote speaker at a conference entitled "The Future of Asia". She met with the relatives of the Japanese victims of the July 2016 terror attack.
Saudi Arabia	Makkah, Medina	31 May–3 June	Organisation of Islamic Cooperation Summit	Hasina attended the 14th IOC summit. She performed umrah and prayed at the grave of Muhammad.
Finland	Helsinki	3 June	State Visit	Hasina met with President Sauli Niinistö at the Presidential Palace.
China	Beijing	3–6 July	Official Visit	Hasina met with President Xi Jinping at the Diaoyutai State Guesthouse and Premier Li Keqiang at the Great Hall of the People. She held a roundtable with Chinese business leaders.
India	Delhi	3 October	Official Visit	Hasina met with President Ram Nath Kovind and Prime Minister Narendra Modi. She was the co-chair of the Indian Economic Summit of the World Economic Forum. The Visit saw the signing of seven agreements between the governments of Bangladesh and India.
Azerbaijan	Baku	25–26 October	Official Visit	Hasina attended the 18th Summit of the Non-Aligned Movement.
India	Kolkata	22 November	Official Visit	Hasina attended a cricket match between Bangladesh and India at Eden Gardens.
Spain	Madrid	31 November–3 December	Official Visit	Hasina attended the 2019 United Nations Climate Change Conference.

== 2020 ==
Country	Areas Visited	Date(s)	Purpose(s)	Notes
United Arab Emirates	Abu Dhabi	12 January	State Visit	Hasina met with Prime Minister Mohammed bin Rashid Al Maktoum and Abu Dhabi Crown Prince Mohamed bin Zayed Al Nahyan. She attended the Abu Dhabi Sustainable Week and the Zayed Sustainable Awards Ceremony.
Italy	Rome	4–8 February	State Visit	Hasina met with Prime Minister Giuseppe Conte at Palazzo Chigi.

== 2021 ==
Country	Areas Visited	Date(s)	Purpose(s)	Notes
Maldives	Malé	22–23 December	State Visit	Hasina met with then–president Ibrahim Mohamed Solih and held official talks on strengthening relations between the two countries.

== 2022 ==
Country	Areas Visited	Date(s)	Purpose(s)	Notes
United Kingdom	London	18–19 September	Official Visit	Hasina attended the Funeral of Elizabeth II

== 2023 ==
Country	Areas Visited	Date(s)	Purpose(s)	Notes
Japan	Tokyo	25–28 April	Official Visit	Hasina met with the prime minister and emperor of Japan.
United States	New York	29 April–4 May	Official Visit	Hasina met President and vice president of World Bank to celebrate 50th anniversary of Bangladesh and World Bank partnership.
United Kingdom	London	4–9 May	Official Visit	Hasina attended the Coronation of the King Charles III

== 2024 ==
Country	Areas Visited	Date(s)	Purpose(s)	Notes
China	Beijing	8−10 July	Official Visit	State visit
