= Gopalganj-3 =

Constituency of Bangladesh's Jatiya Sangsad

Coordinates: 22.99°N 90.00°E

- Constituency for the Jatiya Sangsad
- District: Gopalganj District
- Division: Dhaka Division
- Electorate: 308,784 (2026)

Current constituency
- Created: 1984
- Party: Bangladesh Nationalist Party
- Member: S M Jilani
- ← 216 Gopalganj-2 218 Madaripur-1 →

Gopalganj-3 is a constituency represented in the Jatiya Sangsad (National Parliament) of Bangladesh since 2026 by S M Jilani of the Bangladesh Nationalist Party.

== Boundaries ==
The constituency encompasses Kotalipara and Tungipara upazilas.

== History ==
The constituency was created in 1984 from a Faridpur constituency when the former Faridpur District was split into five districts: Rajbari, Faridpur, Gopalganj, Madaripur, and Shariatpur.

== Members of Parliament ==
Election	Member	Party
1986	Kazi Firoz Rashid	Jatiya Party
1991	Sheikh Hasina	Awami League
Feb 1996	Mujibur Rahman Howlader	Independent
Jun 1996	Sheikh Hasina	Awami League
2001	Sheikh Hasina	Awami League
2008	Sheikh Hasina	Awami League
2014	Sheikh Hasina	Awami League
2018	Sheikh Hasina	Awami League
2024	Sheikh Hasina	Awami League
2026	S M Jilani	Bangladesh Nationalist Party

== Elections ==
=== Elections in the 2020s ===
General Election 2026: Gopalganj-3
Party	Candidate	Votes	%	±%
BNP	S M Jilani	60,991	46.0	N/A
Independent	Gobinda Chandra Pramanik	34,339	25.9	N/A
BKM	Abdul Aziz	25,153	19.0	N/A
IAB	Md. Maruf Sheikh	4,717	3.6	N/A
Independent	Md. Habibur Rahman	3,805	2.9	N/A
GOP	Abul Bashar	2,600	2.0	N/A
NPP	Sheikh Salauddin	591	0.4	N/A
Gano Forum	Dulal Chandra Biswas	269	0.2	N/A
Majority		26,652	20.1	N/A
Turnout		132,465	42.9	N/A
BNP gain from AL				

=== Elections in the 2010s ===
General Election 2018: Gopalganj-3
Party	Candidate	Votes	%	±%
AL	Sheikh Hasina	229,539	99.9	+1.2
BNP	S M Jilani	123	0.05	N/A
IAB	Maruf Sheikh	71	0.03	N/A
Majority		229,416	99.9	+2.5
Turnout		229,747	93.2	+3.7
AL hold				

General Election 2014: Gopalganj-3
Party	Candidate	Votes	%	±%
AL	Sheikh Hasina	187,185	98.7	+1.6
JP(E)	A. Z. Sheikh Apu	2,430	1.3	N/A
Majority		184,755	97.4	+3.0
Turnout		189,615	89.5	+2.7
AL hold				

=== Elections in the 2000s ===
General Election 2008: Gopalganj-3
Party	Candidate	Votes	%	±%
AL	Sheikh Hasina	158,958	97.1	+2.4
BNP	S. M. Jilani	4,451	2.7	N/A
Bangladesh Kalyan Party	SM Afzal Hossain	221	0.1	N/A
Majority		154,507	94.4	+4.1
Turnout		163,630	86.8	−0.5
AL hold				

General Election 2001: Gopalganj-3
Party	Candidate	Votes	%	±%
AL	Sheikh Hasina	154,130	94.7	+2.5
IOJ	Omar Ahmad Saheb	7,223	4.4	N/A
Bangladesh Hindu League	Birendra Nath Moitra	922	0.6	N/A
IJOF	Shishir Chowdhury	410	0.3	N/A
Majority		146,907	90.3	+0.4
Turnout		162,685	87.3	+17.5
AL hold				

=== Elections in the 1990s ===
General Election June 1996: Gopalganj-3
Party	Candidate	Votes	%	±%
AL	Sheikh Hasina	102,689	92.2	+20.0
BNP	Bishnu Pad Halder	2,568	2.3	0.0
Jamaat	Abdul Mannan Sheikh	2,512	2.3	N/A
BKA	Md. Shahidul Alam Chowdhury	2,277	2.0	−16.3
Zaker Party	Biswas Fazlul Haque	524	0.5	N/A
JP(E)	Kazi Firoz Rashid	453	0.4	N/A
Pragotishi Jatiatabadi Dal (Nurul A Moula)	Sheikh Showkat Hossain Nilu	374	0.3	−1.3
Majority		100,121	89.9	+36.0
Turnout		111,397	79.8	+23.8
AL hold				

General Election 1991: Gopalganj-3
Party	Candidate	Votes	%	±%
AL	Sheikh Hasina	67,945	72.2	
BKA	Hafez Omar Ahmed	17,256	18.3	
Bangladesh Hindu League	Birendra Nath Moitra	4,246	4.5	
BNP	Omelendro Bishwas	2,116	2.3	
Pragotishi Jatiatabadi Dal (Nurul A Moula)	Sheikh Shawkat Hossein Nilu	1,527	1.6	
Sramik Krishak Samajbadi Dal	Nirmal Sen	1,019	1.1	
Majority		50,689	53.9	
Turnout		94,109	56.0	
AL gain from JP(E)				
