= Mausoleum of Sheikh Mujibur Rahman =

Resting place of the first president of Bangladesh

- শেখ মুজিবুর রহমানের সমাধিসৌধ
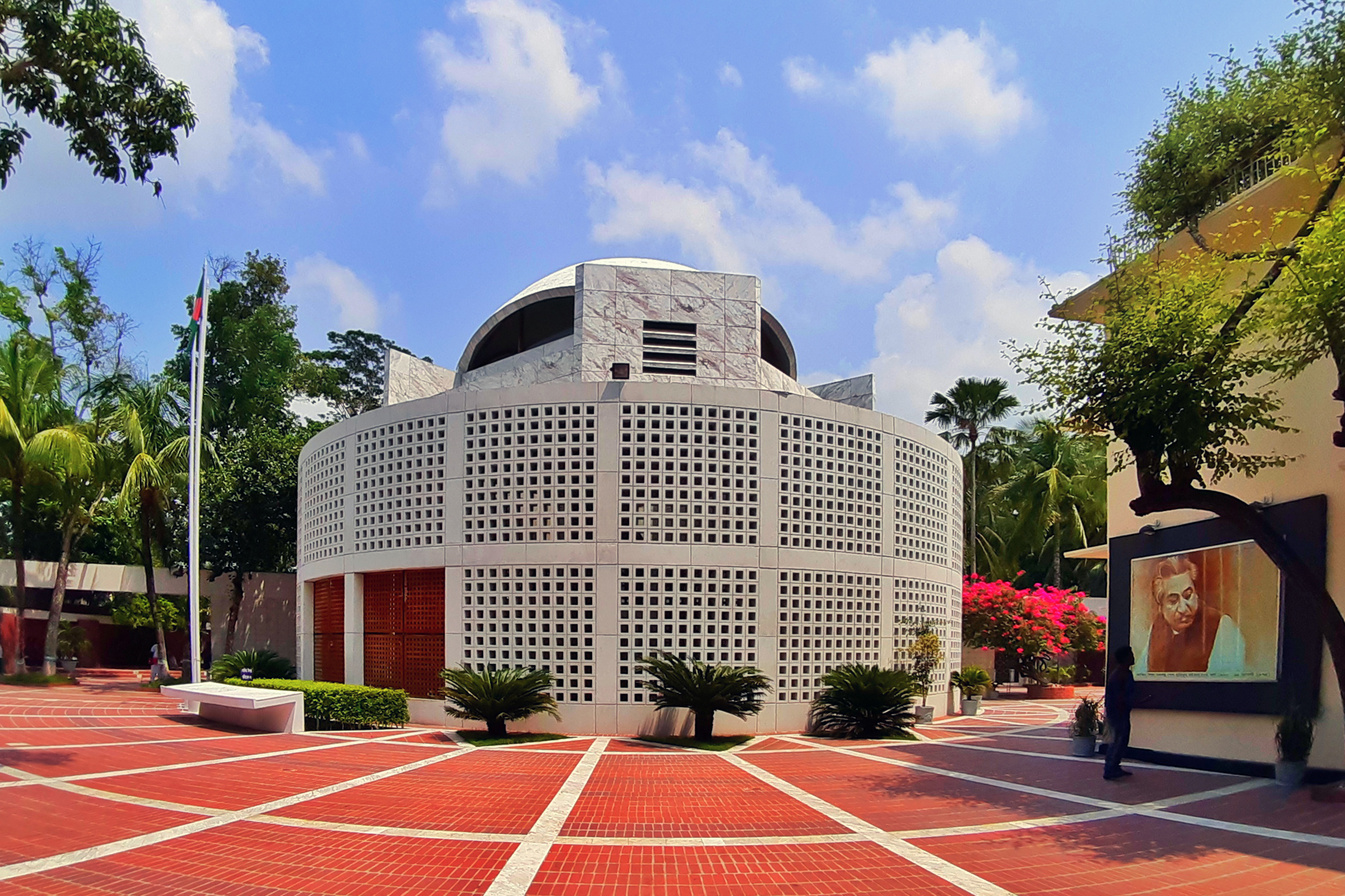
- The mausoleum is the resting place of Bangladesh's founding president Sheikh Mujibur Rahman.

General information
- Type: Mausoleum
- Architectural style: Modernist
- Location: Tungipara, Bangladesh
- Coordinates: 22.9063192°N 89.8963239°E
- Construction started: 16 December 1998
- Inaugurated: 10 January 2001
- Client: Government of Bangladesh

Height
- Height: 14 metres (46 ft)

Technical details
- Structural system: Shell Structure
- Grounds: 154,994.6 square metres (1,668,348 sq ft)

Design and construction
- Architects: Ehsan Khan; Ishtiaque Jahir; Iqbal Habib

The Mausoleum of Bangabandhu Sheikh Mujibur Rahman (Bengali: শেখ মুজিবুর রহমানের সমাধিসৌধ) is the mausoleum of Sheikh Mujibur Rahman, the founding president of the People's Republic of Bangladesh. It is located in Tungipara of Gopalganj district, the birthplace of Mujib, and was designed by architects Ehsan Khan, Ishtiaque Jahir and Iqbal Habib.

After Sheikh Mujibur Rahman was assassinated in 1975, he was buried in his native Tungipara. For many years, the military junta restricted access to the gravesite. After the 1996 general election, the Department of Archaeology officially commenced construction of the complex, which was opened in 2001.

== History ==
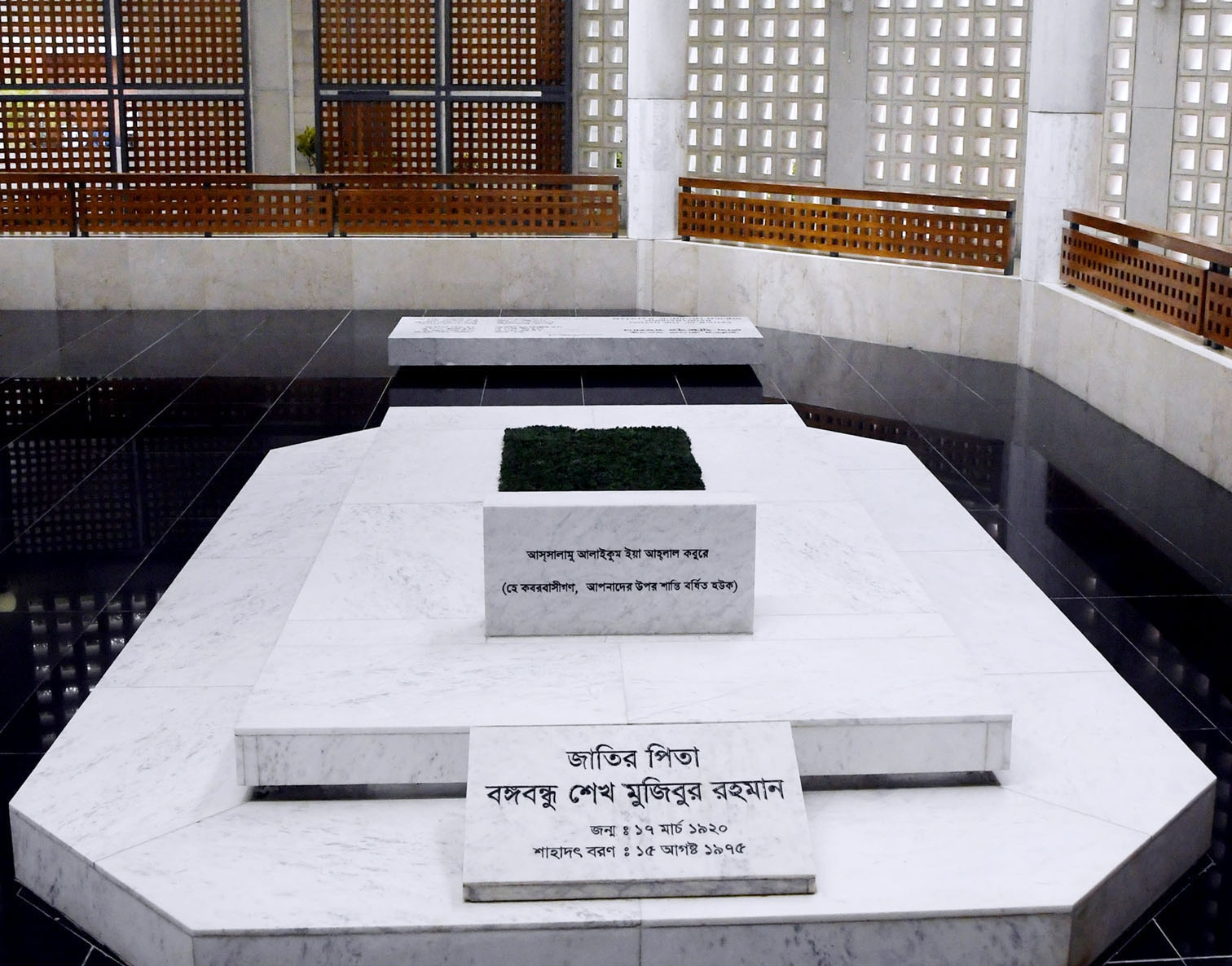
Grave of Sheikh Mujib

After the liberation of Bangladesh, Sheikh Mujibur Rahman became the 2nd prime minister of the country after being released from Mianwali Jail in Pakistan and returning to his motherland. He then started living in his own residence with family instead of moving to the government residence. He lived in his own house till 15 August 1975. On that day, some disgruntled army officers carried out the assassination of Sheikh Mujibur Rahman. His wife Sheikh Fazilatunnesa Mujib, his sons Sheikh Kamal, Sheikh Jamal, and Sheikh Russel were killed in the attack on their residence.

The next day, the military junta buried all but Mujib's body in the Banani graveyard. It was decided to bury Sheikh Mujibur Rahman at his birthplace, Tungipara, away from the country's capital. The Director General of Forces Intelligence assigned a major to hand over his body to his village relatives and supervise the burial. Major Haider Ali and 14 army personnel brought Mujib's dead body to Tungipara by helicopter. They found a distant relative of Mujib named Mosharraf Hussain whom they entrusted to bury Mujib. When a village imam was brought to perform the process, Ali asked him to bury the body without performing the funeral rites. Better than this, the imam said that if the dead person is a Shaheed, then he can be buried in this way. After listening to imam's answer, Major Ali asked to complete the funeral at low cost and quickly. However, public attendance at the funeral was kept limited and strictly regulated by the police and military forces, with many being obstructed on their way to the funeral. Sheikh Mujibur Rahman was buried next to his parents after completing the burial. Entry to his grave area was restricted for many years and no one was allowed to enter.

In 1994, architect Ehsan Khan, Ishtiaq Zahir and Iqbal Habib were commissioned to convert Bangabandhu's residence in Dhaka into a museum. After they completed the work in 1995, they were offered to build a mausoleum complex for Sheikh Mujibur Rahman at Tungipara. In 1996, the government selected them to implement the mausoleum complex project. They were given two years to complete the project. The prime minister gave them the basic idea of what will be built under the master plan. The construction started in 1998. The foundation stone of the complex was laid on 17 March 1999 and inaugurated on 10 January 2001. The complex has been designed in such a way that it fits into the village environment. Care was taken not to spoil the environment and nature of the area where the complex was built.

== Layout ==
=== Mausoleum ===
The center of the complex has a tomb building. The tomb is located in front of the complex after passing the gardens on both sides. The tomb built of red ceramic and black and white marble, contains the graves of three people including Mujib and his parents. The grave is clad in white marble and surrounded by a dome. Light spills into the tomb through the latticed walls and the carved glass above.

=== Library and museum ===
The complex contains a library with 6,000 books and a museum. There is also an exhibition center featuring photographs of the Bangladesh War of Independence, as well as of Mujib from various periods and local-foreign historical newspapers. The coffin that carried Mujib is also preserved here. There are also a research center, open stage, public plaza, an administrative building, cafeteria, Bakultala Square, and a souvenir shop. Flower gardens and artificial hills line both sides of the wide road by the library.

=== Ancestral residence and mosque ===
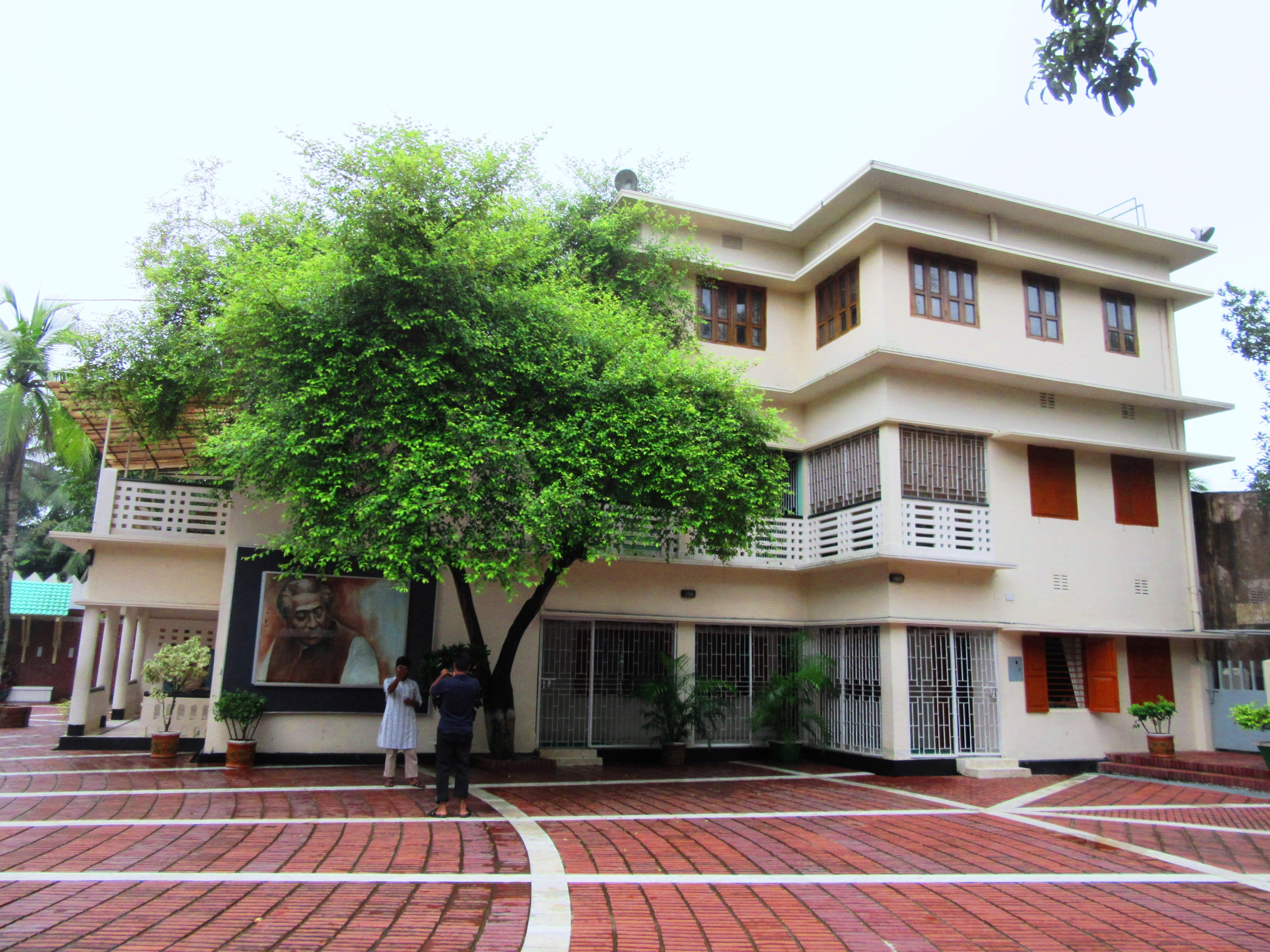
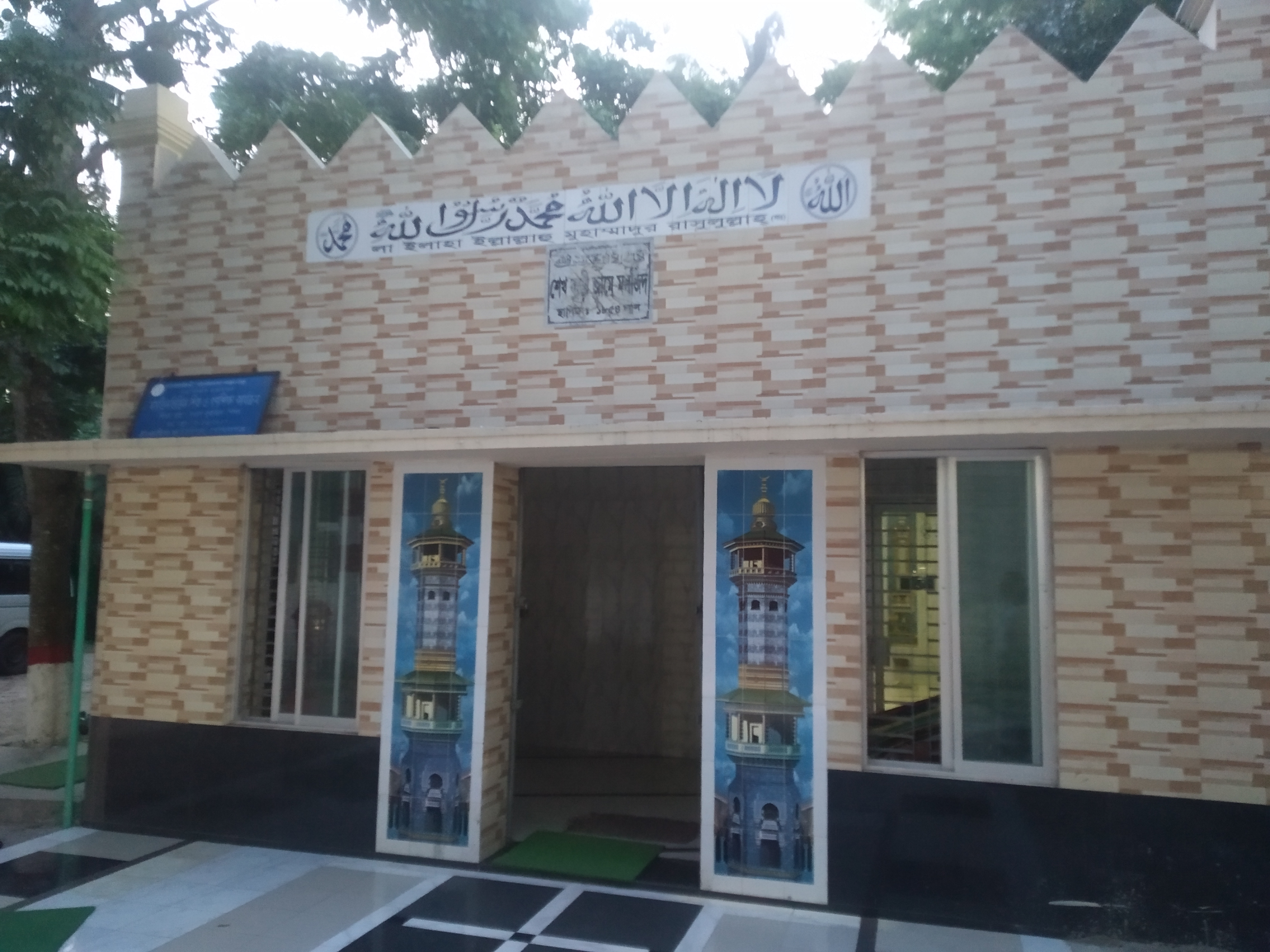
The ancestral house of Mujib (left) and Sheikh family mosque (right)

There is Mujib's ancestral house beside the tomb and a Sheikh family mosque established in 1854.

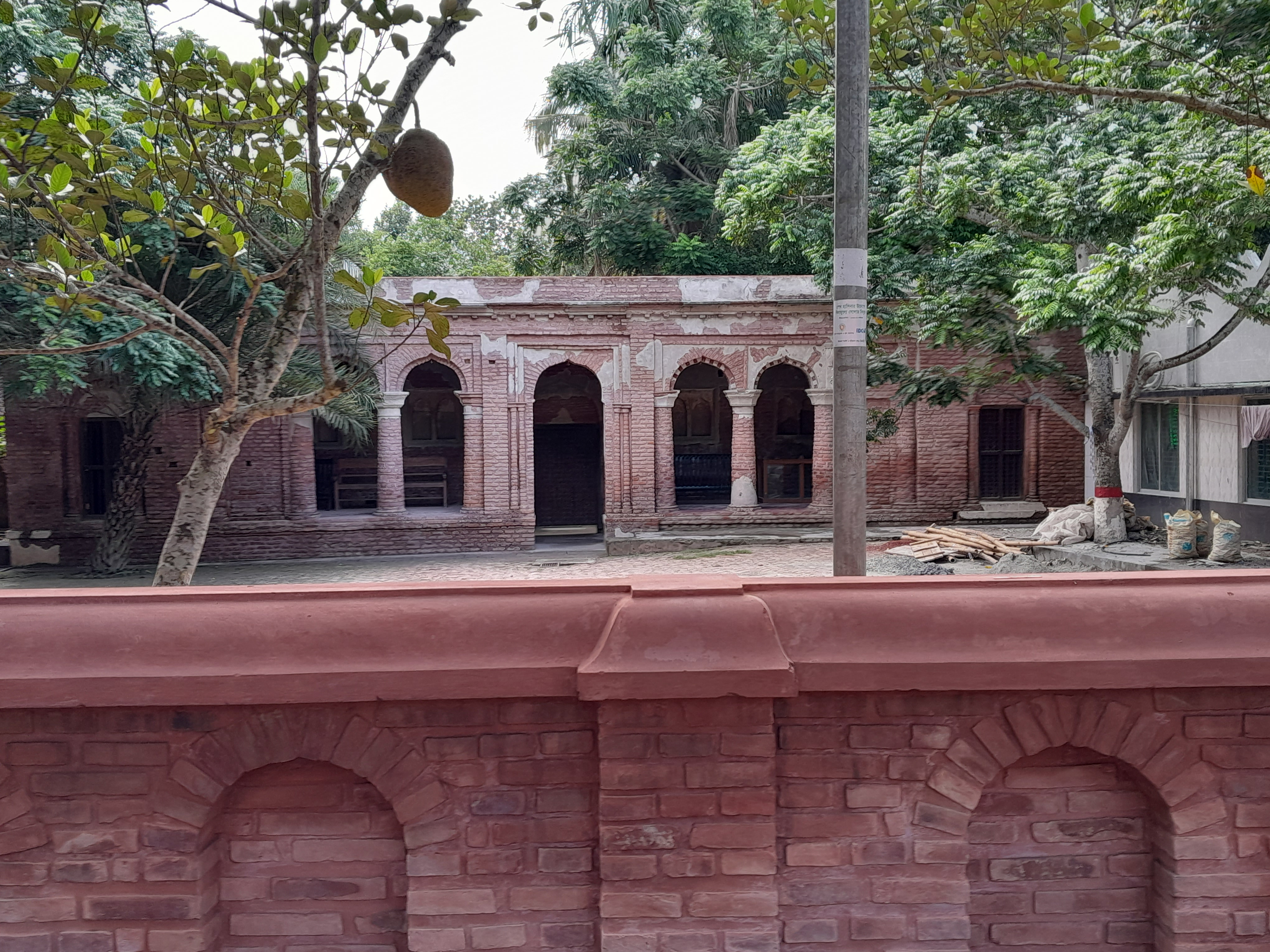
The old residence of the Sheikh family; the building was damaged during the Bangladesh Liberation War in 1971

Apart from this, there is historical places related to the life of Mujib such as a pond, family garden etc. There is an amusement park named after Sheikh Russel.

== List of burials ==
Name	Explanation	Birth	Death	Notes
Sheikh Mujibur Rahman	Bangladeshi politician and founding father and 1st President of Bangladesh	1920	1975	Assassinated with his family during coup d'état.
Sheikh Lutfar Rahman	Father of Sheikh Mujibur Rahman	1881	1975	Former Sheristadar at the Gopalganj civil court in British India.
Sayera Khatun	Mother of Sheikh Mujibur Rahman	1886	1975	Housewife and the matriarch of Sheikh-Wazed political family.

== Significance ==
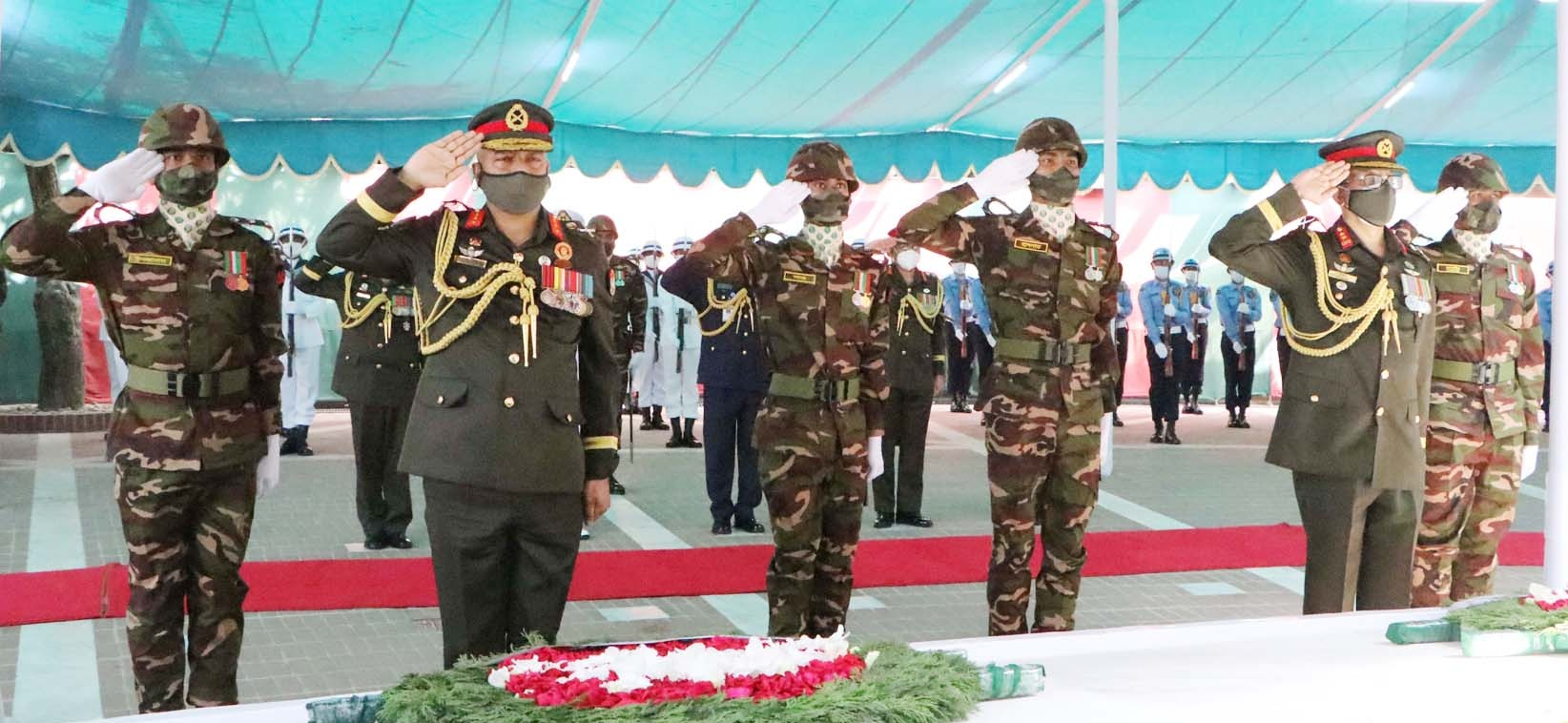
Military ceremony at the graveyard on Mujib's birthday

Annual ceremonies take place here on special occasions, such as on 26 March (Independence Day), 16 December (Victory Day), 17 March (Mujib's birthday) and 15 August (National Mourning Day). Dignitaries from foreign countries also visit the mausoleum during tours.

== In popular culture ==
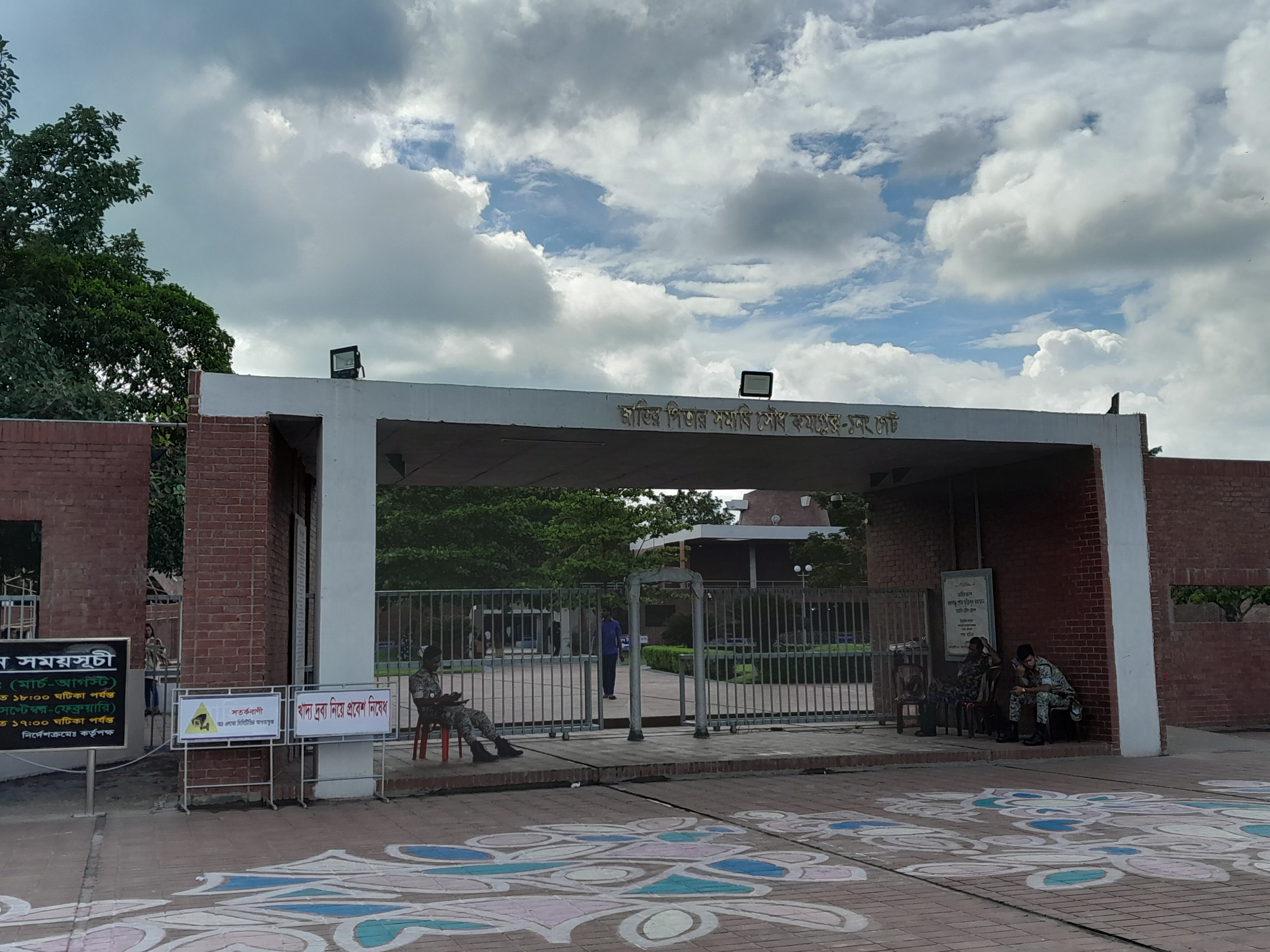
Entrance gate of the mausoleum complex

In 1984, Syed Fakhruddin Mahmud wrote a poem about the mausoleum titled Ekti Omor Somadhi (lit. 'An immortal tomb').

An Immortal Tomb

"Stop wayfarer". A true Bengali, if you are

Stand for a moment, on this burial ground.

Here sleeps, Bengali's greatest leader

The liberator of this country, the jewel of Bengal's eyes.

Burned a hundred sorrows, who in exchange for life

Bengalis have been given a site, at the edge of the world..."

The poem is engraved on the stone at the entrance gate of the mausoleum complex.

== Gallery ==
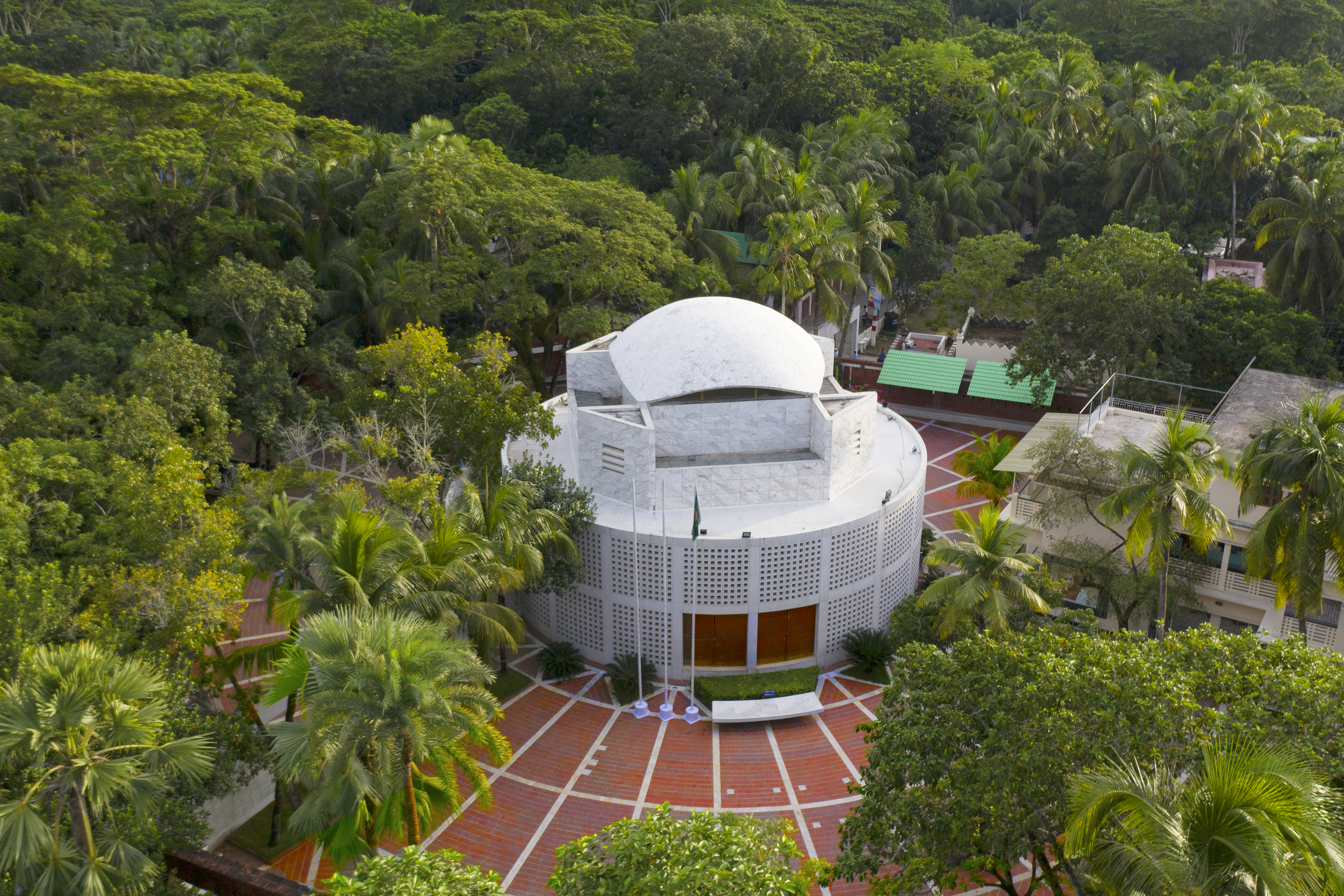
Aerial view of the tomb

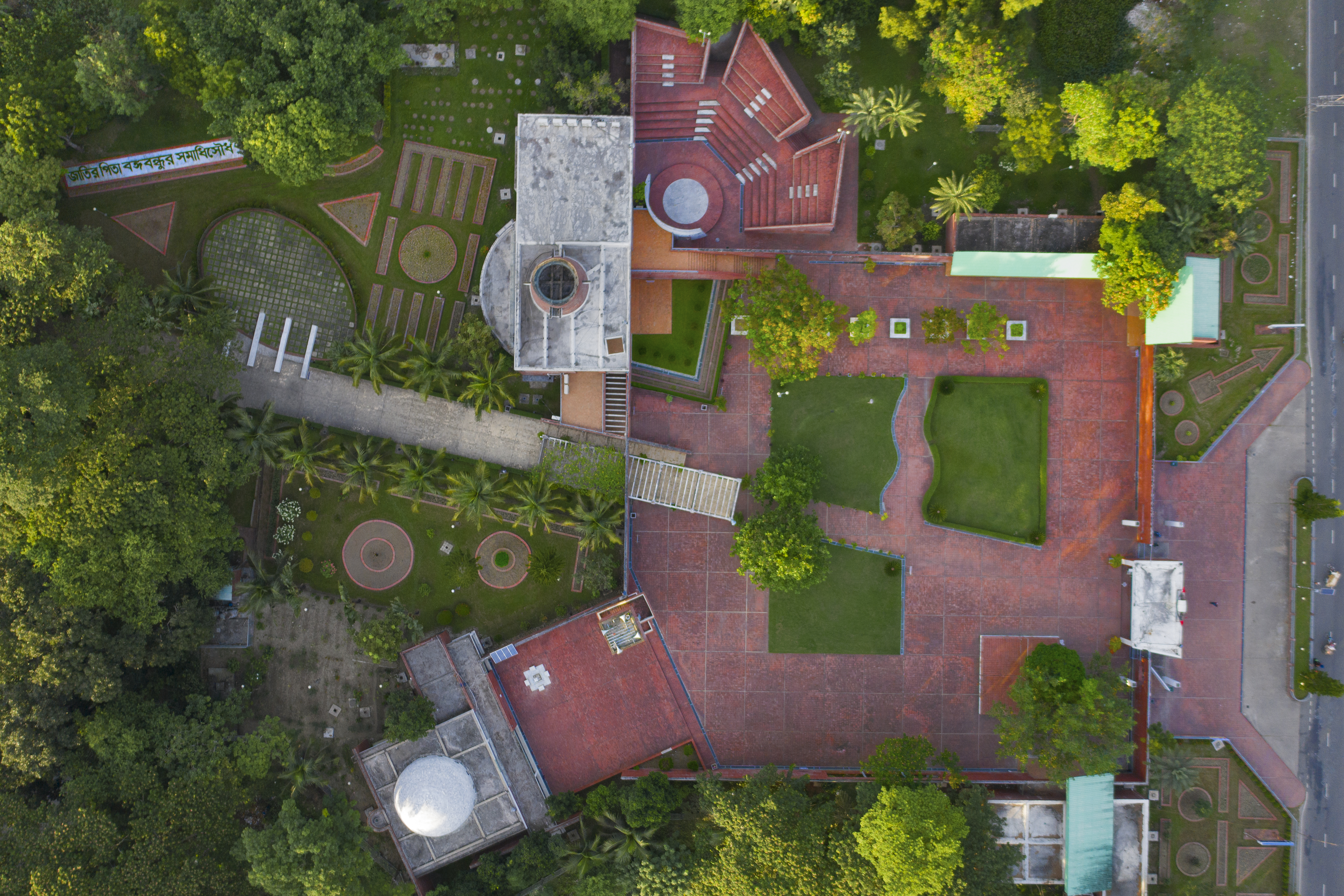
Mausoleum area

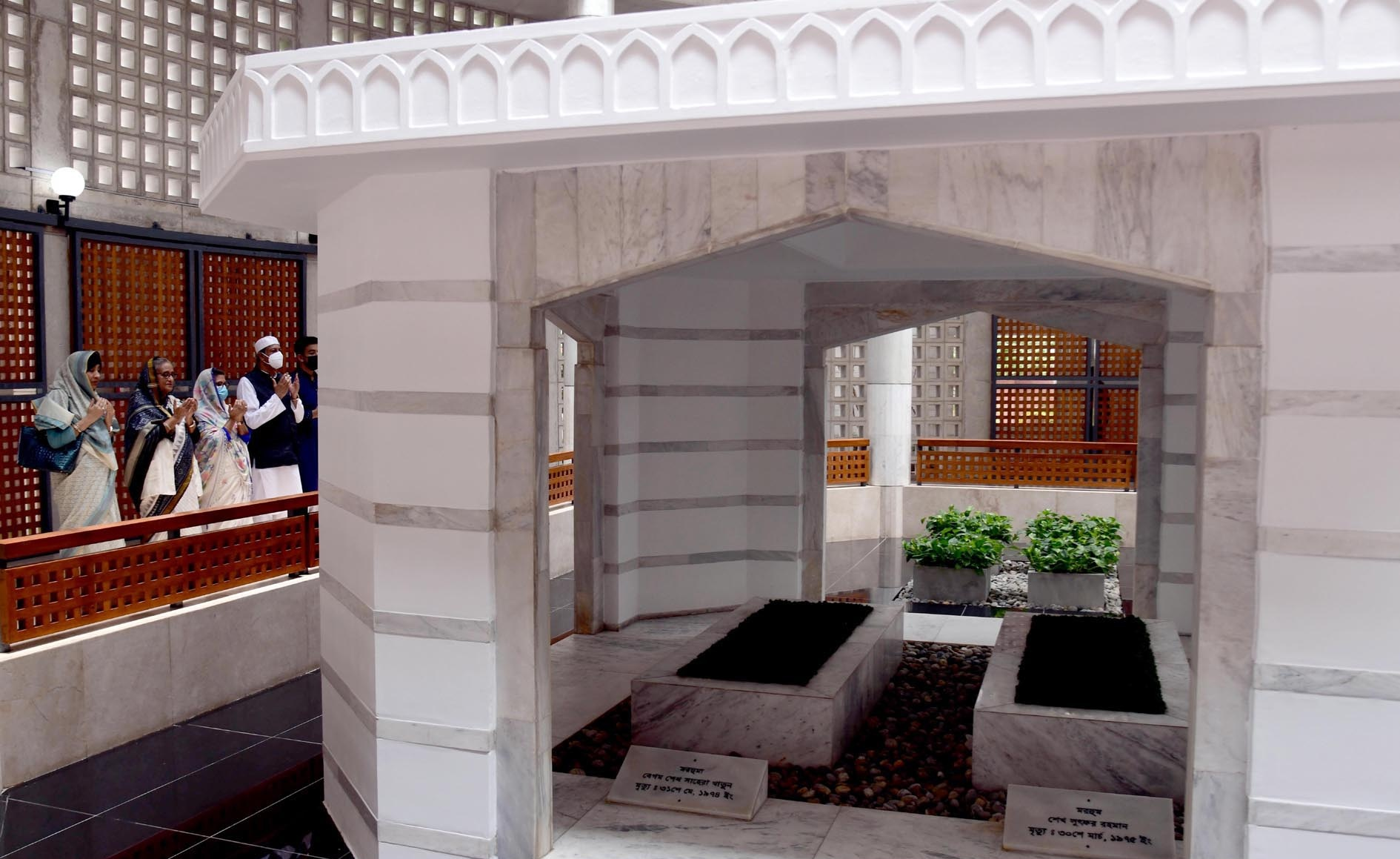
Sheikh Mujib's parent's grave

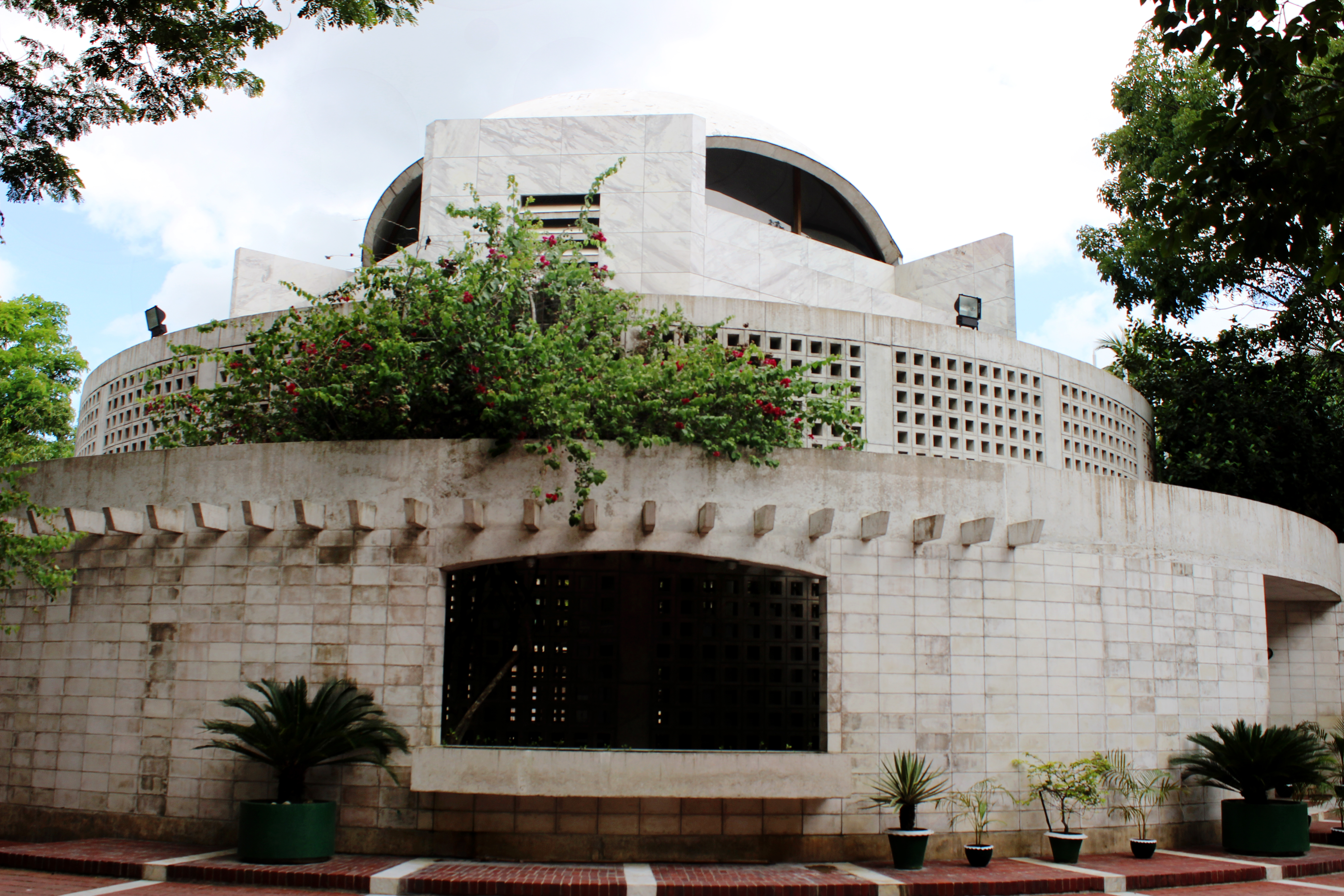
A view of the mausoleum

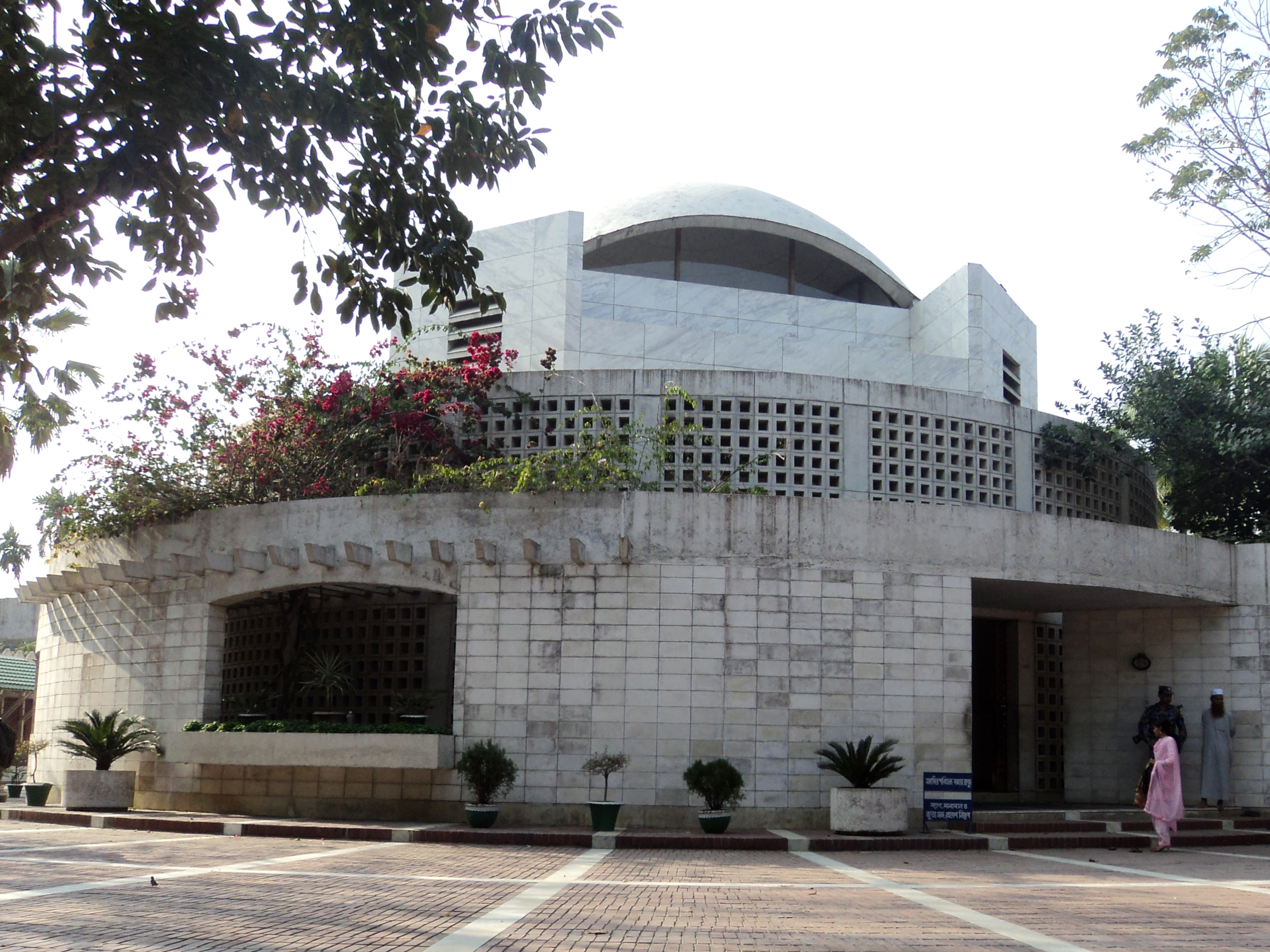
Main entrance of the tomb
