= Tungipara Upazila =

Tungipara টুঙ্গিপাড়া
- Upazila
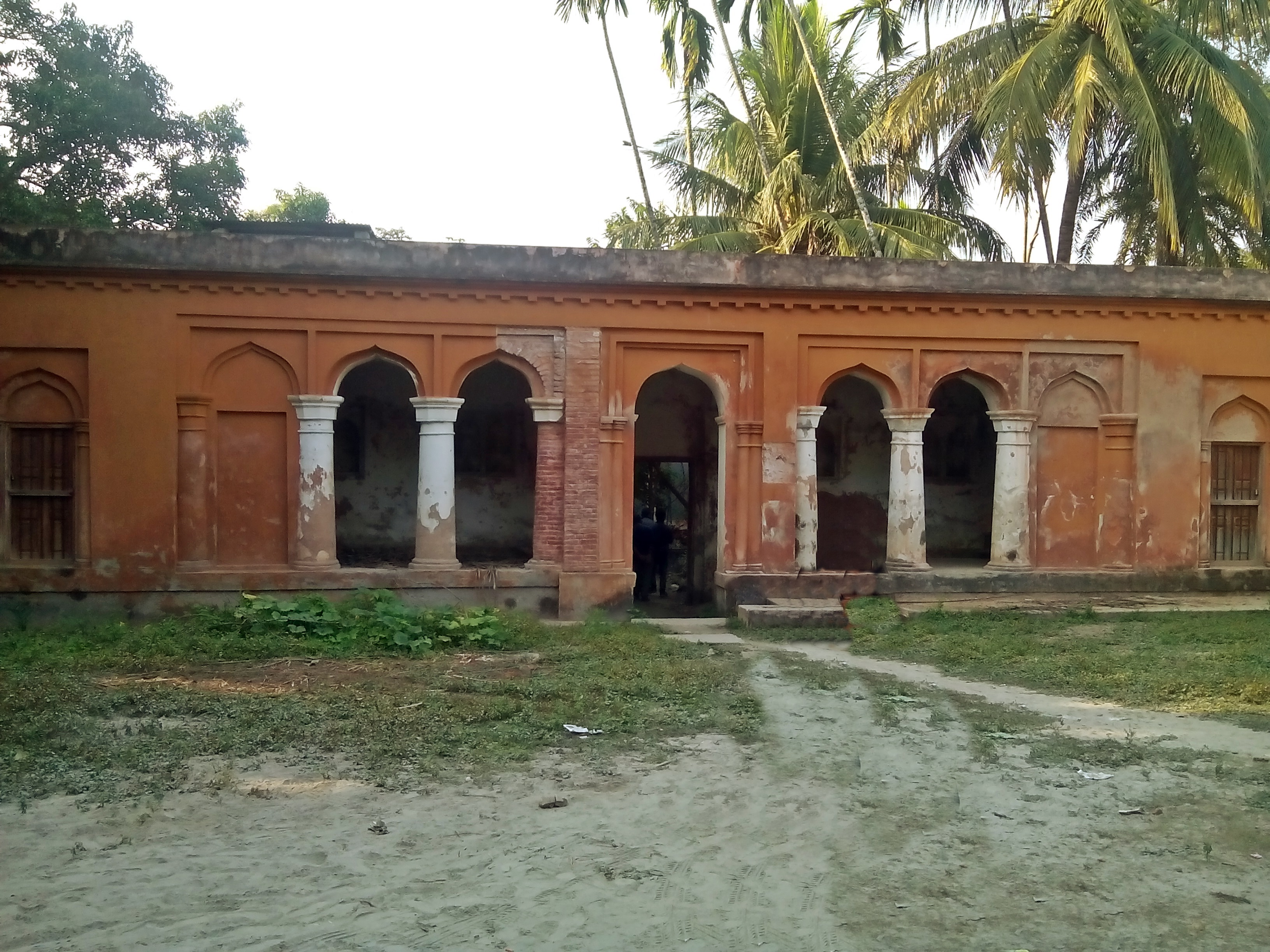
- Ancestral residence of the Tungipara Sheikh family

- Coordinates: 22°54′N 89°53′E
- Country: Bangladesh
- Division: Dhaka
- District: Gopalganj
- Thana: 1974
- Upazila: 1995

Area
  - Total: 128.53 km^{2} (49.63 sq mi)

Population (2022)
  - Total: 114,482
  - Density: 890.70/km^{2} (2,306.9/sq mi)
- Time zone: UTC+6 (BST)
- Postal code: 8120
- Area code: 06655
- Website: tungipara.gopalganj.gov.bd

Tungipara Upazila mauza geocode map

Tungipara (Bengali: টুঙ্গিপাড়া) is an upazila of Gopalganj District in Dhaka Division, Bangladesh. It is the birthplace of Sheikh Mujibur Rahman, the first President of Bangladesh, as well as his daughter, Sheikh Hasina, Bangladesh's longest serving prime minister. In 1995, it was carved out of Gopalganj Sadar Upazila to become an upazila.

== Etymology ==
There is a legend that this area used to be flooded. Some saints who practiced Islam relocated to this area from Persia. They started living in this area by making canopied houses at low cost. Such houses are called "Tong" in Bengali hence the name of the place is Tungipara (Tungi+para). "Para" means neighborhood.

== Geography ==
Tungipara is located at 22.9000°N 89.8833°E on the north-eastern bank of the Modhumoti River. It is the most southern upazila of Gopalganj District. To the north is Gopalganj Sadar, the east is Kotalipara Upazila, on the south Nazirpur Upazila in Pirojpur District and in the west is Chitalmari Upazila of Bagerhat District. Tungipara Upazila has a total area of 128.53 km^{2}.

The famous river Madhumati divides Tungipara from Bagerhat District.

== Demographics ==
According to the 2022 Bangladeshi census, Tungipara Upazila had 26,331 households and a population of 114,482. 10.64% of the population were under 5 years of age. Tungipara had a literacy rate (age 7 and over) of 81.41%: 81.76% for males and 81.06% for females, and a sex ratio of 98.45 males for every 100 females. 22,104 (19.31%) lived in urban areas.

Religions in Tungipara Upazila (2022)
Religion	Percent
Islam	73.64%
Hinduism	26.26%
Other or not stated	0.10%

Population by religion in Union
Union	Muslim	Hindu	Others
Barni Union	14,300	857	1
Dumuria Union	13,953	7,753	52
Gopalpur Union	1,359	14,410	48
Kushali Union	17,277	1,080	0
Patgati Union	28,586	5,019	16

🟩 Muslim majority 🟧 Hindu majority

According to the 2011 Census of Bangladesh, Tungipara Upazila had 20,575 households and a population of 100,893. 25,517 (25.29%) were under 10 years of age. Tungipara had a literacy rate (age 7 and over) of 56.61%, compared to the national average of 51.8%, and a sex ratio of 997 females per 1000 males. 38,020 (37.68%) lived in urban areas.

As of the 1991 Census of Bangladesh, Tungipara has a population of 88,102. Males constitute 51.25% of the population, and females 48.75%. This Upazila's 18+ population is 42,147. Tungipara has an average literacy rate of 63.3% (7+ years), and the national average of 32.4% literate.

== Points of interest ==
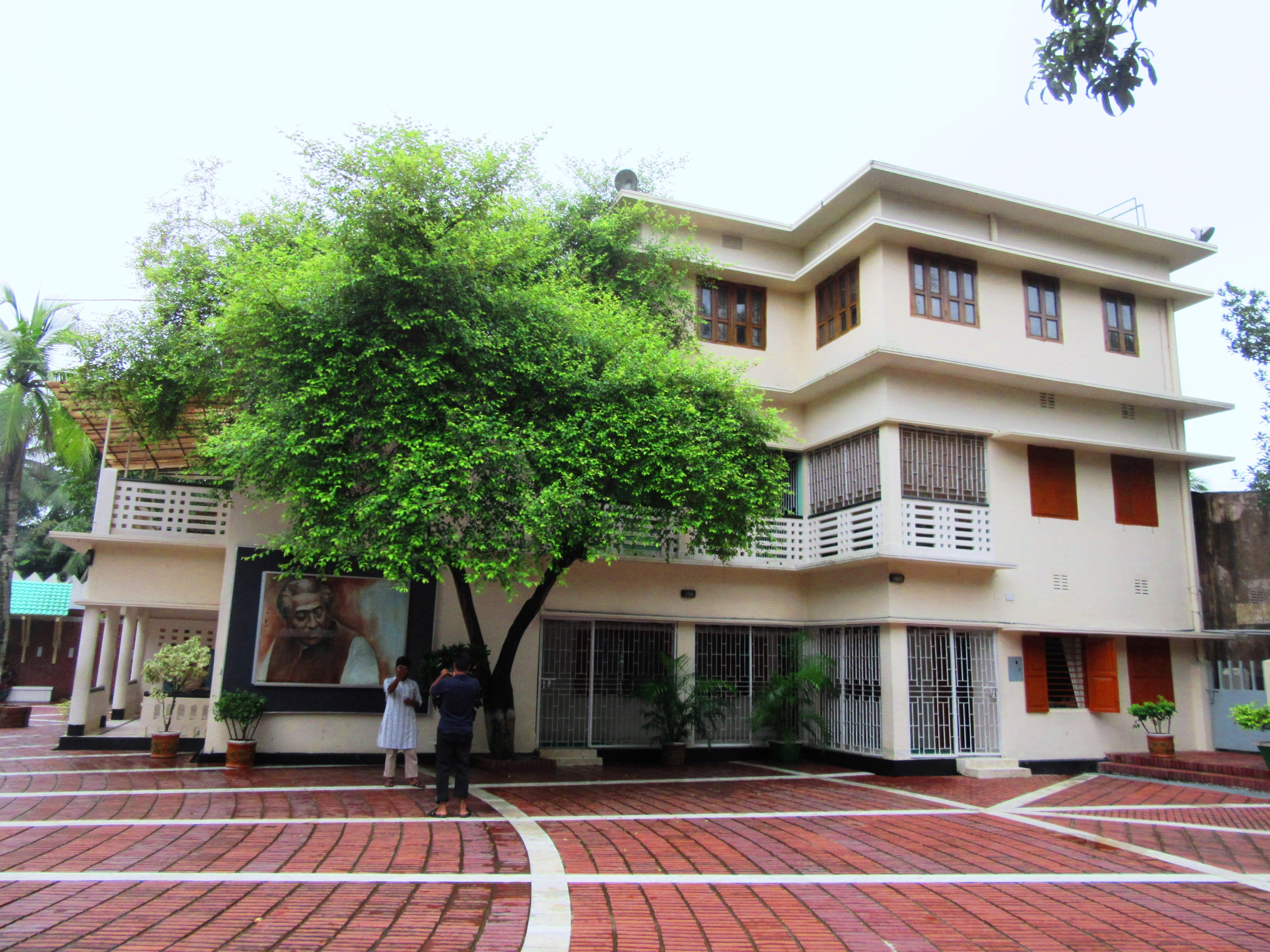
Sheikh Mujibur Rahman's house

- Mausoleum of Sheikh Mujibur Rahman
- Borni'r Baor
- Madhumati River
- Patgati Bazar
- Baghir River

== Administration ==
Tungipara Upazila is divided into Tungipara Municipality and five union parishads: Barni, Dumuria, Gopalpur, Kushli, and Patgati. The union parishads are subdivided into 34 mauzas and 67 villages.

Tungipara Municipality is subdivided into 9 wards and 13 mahallas.

== Education ==
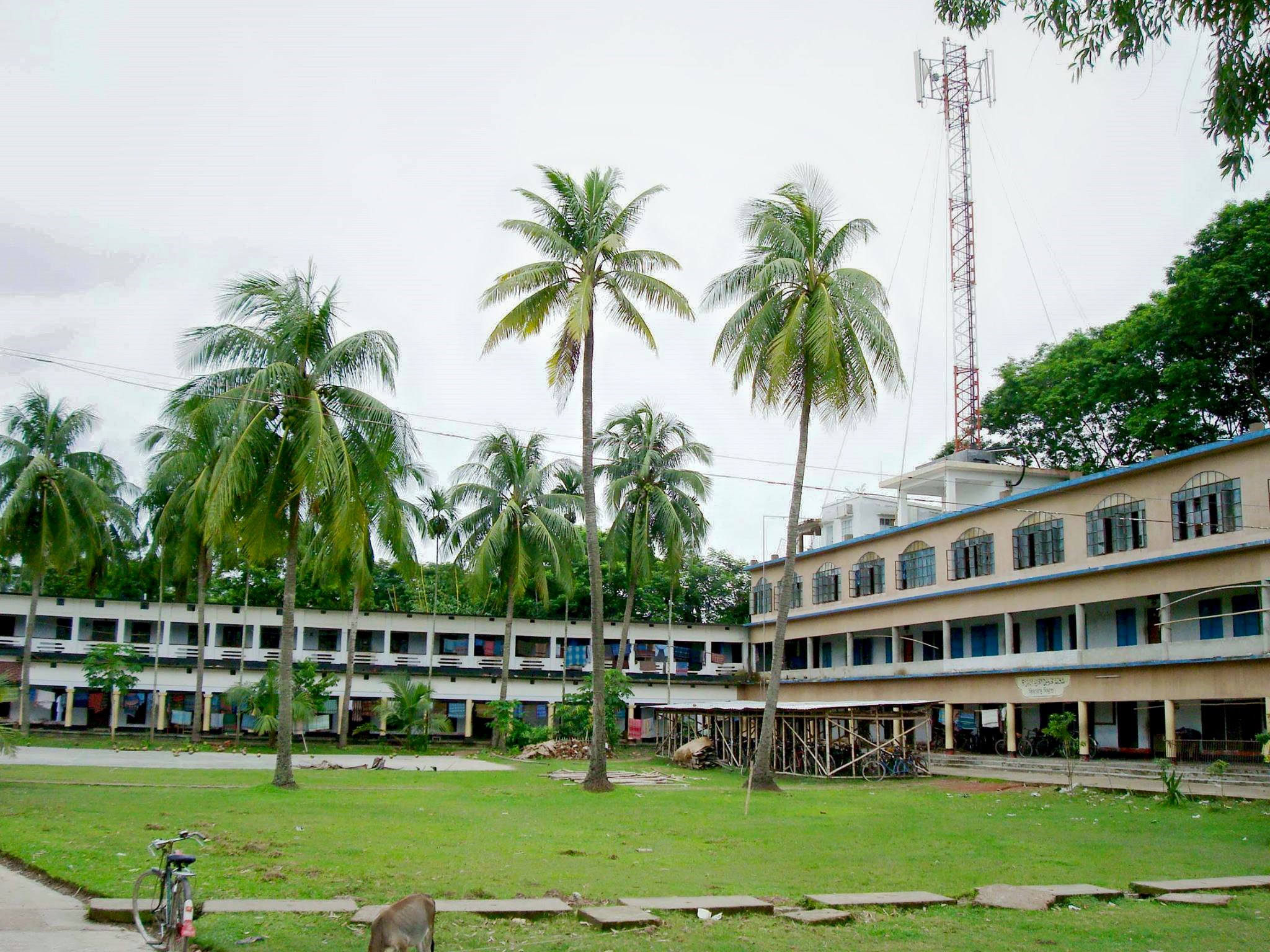
Gawhardanga Madrasa

There are 24 main educational institutes in Tungipara.

=== College ===
1. Govt. Shaikh Muzibur Rahman College, Patgati
2. Dr. Imdadul Haque Memorial Degree College, Bashbaria

=== School ===
1. Govt. Gimadanga Tungipara High School
2. Khan Saheb Sheikh Mosarrof Hossain School & College
3. Guadanga Silna B.B.H High School
4. Saptapalli J. High School
5. Gopalpur Panchapalli High School
6. Nilfa Borni High School
7. Kusli Islamia High School
8. Basuria S. High School
9. Barni High School
10. Govt. Bangobandhu Smriti Girls High School
11. Gimadanga Ideal High School
12. Bashbaria Jhanjhania High School
13. Dumuria ML. High School
14. Tarail Adarsha High School
15. Baladanga SMM High School
16. Khan Saheb Sheikh Mosarraf Hossain High School
17. Begum Fatema Jr. Girls School
18. Treepalli Shaikh Abu Naser Jr. School
19. Kusli Khan Saheb Sheikh Mosarraf Hossain Jr. School
20. Patgati Jr. School

=== Madrasa ===
1. Gaohordanga Madrasa
2. Darul Ulam Gaohordanga Madrasha (Kawmi)
3. Bashbaria Jhanjhania Islamia Madrasha (Kawmi)
4. Gimadanga Senior Madrasha (Alia)
5. Gimadanga Gozalia Mohila Fazil Madrasha (Alia)

== Notable people ==
- Abul Hassan, poet, was born at Barnigram in Tungipara in 1947
- Shamsul Haque Faridpuri, Islamic scholar
- Sheikh Hasina, former prime minister of Bangladesh, was born in Tungipara in 1947
- Sheikh Mujibur Rahman, Bangladesh's founding leader and first president, was born in Tungipara in 1920

== See also ==
- Districts of Bangladesh
- Divisions of Bangladesh
- Upazilas of Bangladesh
- Thanas of Bangladesh
