= Gimadanga =

Coordinates: 22°54′45″N 89°53′03″E

Gimadanga (Bengali: গিমাডাঙ্গা) is the largest village of Patgati Union in Tungipara Upazila, Gopalganj District, Bangladesh.

== History ==
Gimadanga was once under water, so the people lived on higher land. The village is called Gimadanga because, in the Bengali language, high land surrounded by water on every side is called danga. As the village is large, different parts are named Purbopara, Possimpara, Dokhinpara, Uttarpara, and Moddhopara.

== Economy ==
Agriculture is the main occupation in this village, but some people are employed by the government.

== Education ==
Gimdanga Tungipara Government High School is the only secondary school in the village.

== See also ==
- List of villages in Bangladesh
