= Public holidays in Bangladesh =

Bangladesh observes numerous public holidays, which include national memorials, religious celebrations, and secular holidays of Bengali origin. The traditional Bengali calendar, known as Baṅgābda, is both the national and official calendar of the country.

Holidays in Bangladesh are celebrated according to various calendars, depending on the occasion. Religious festivals such as Eid are based on the Islamic calendar, while other national holidays are observed according to the Bengali and Gregorian calendars. Since the Islamic calendar is lunar, it does not remain synchronized with the seasons, resulting in a seasonal drift. Consequently, some public holidays, particularly those tied to Islamic events, shift each year based on the lunar cycle.

There are fifteen public holidays in Bangladesh. Muslims and non-Muslims have four religious holidays each in addition to the seven secular national holidays. For the Muslims, nine major Islamic holidays: Ashura, Mawlid, Isra' and Mi'raj, Shab-e-Barat, first day of Ramadan, Revelation of the Quran, Laylat al-Qadr, Eid ul-Fitr and Eid ul-Adha are observed. For the Hindus: Holi, Krishna Janmashtami, Durga Puja, Diwali and Raksha Bandhan are celebrated. As for the Christians: New Year, Good Friday, Easter Saturday, Easter Sunday, Halloween, Christmas Eve, Christmas, Boxing Day, St. Patrick's Day and New Year's Eve are celebrated. Buddhists: Vesak and Chinese New Year are celebrated.

== General holidays ==
National
Religious
International

=== List ===
Date	Name		Remarks
Date	English	Bengali	Remarks
21 February	Language Movement Day	শহীদ দিবস	Protests and sacrifices to protect Bengali as a national language during Bengali language movement of 1952.
26 March	Independence Day	স্বাধীনতা দিবস	Proclamation of Independence and the start of the Liberation War.
Last friday of Ramadan	Jumu'atul-Wida	জুমাতুল বিদা	The day is observed in Bangladesh, marks one of the most sacred days in the Islamic calendar, signifying the last Friday of Ramadan. It is a day of profound prayer and reflection, where Muslims across the nation gather in mosques, seeking forgiveness and blessings in the closing moments of this holy month.
1 Shawwal	Eid al-Fitr	ঈদুল ফিতর	End of the month of Ramadan (Festival of Fastbreaking).
1 May	International Workers' Day	মে দিবস	International Workers' Day
1st full moon of Baishakh	Buddha's Birthday	বুদ্ধ পূর্ণিমা	The birth of the Prince Siddhartha Gautama, later the Gautama Buddha and founder of Buddhism.
10 Dhu al-Hijjah	Eid al-Adha	ঈদুল আজহা	"Sacrifice Feast", the willingness of Abraham to sacrifice his son Ishmael.
5 August	July Mass Uprising Day	জুলাই গণ-অভ্যুত্থান দিবস	The end of the July Uprising.
8 Bhadra	Krishna Janmashtami	জন্মাষ্টমী	The birth of Krishna, the eighth avatar of Vishnu.
12 Rabi' al-Awwal	Mawlid	ঈদে মিলাদুন্নবী	Birth of Muhammad
10 Ashvin	Vijayadashami	বিজয়া দশমী	The battle of goddess Durga with the shape-shifting, deceptive and powerful buffalo demon Mahishasura, and her emerging victorious.
7 November	National Revolution and Solidarity Day	জাতীয় বিপ্লব ও সংহতি দিবস	Sipahi–Janata Revolution
16 December	Victory Day	বিজয় দিবস	Surrender of Pakistan, ending of the Liberation War.
25 December	Christmas Day	বড়দিন	Jesus Christ's birthday.

== Government holidays ==
National
Religious
International

=== List ===
Date	Name		Remarks
Date	English	Bengali	Remarks
15 Shaban	Mid-Sha'ban	শবে বরাত	Muslims ask for forgiveness for their wrongdoings.
27 Ramadan	Night of Power	শবে কদর	
29/30 Ramadan	Yesterday of Eid al-Fitr	চাঁদ রাতের দিন	
2 Shawwal	Next day of Eid al-Fitr	ঈদুল ফিতরের দ্বিতীয় দিন	
14 April	Pohela Boishakh	পহেলা বৈশাখ	The start of the Bengali calendar year.
9 Dhu al-Hijjah	Yesterday of Eid al-Adha	ঈদুল আজহার আগের দিন	
11 Dhu al-Hijjah	Next day of Eid al-Adha	ঈদুল আজহার দ্বিতীয় দিন	
10 Muharram	Ashura	আশুরা	Shia: death of Husayn ibn Ali; Sunni: parting of the Red Sea
5 August	July Mass Uprising Day	জুলাই গণ-অভ্যুত্থান দিবস	The end of the July Uprising.

== Optional holidays ==
Buddhist
Christian
Hindu
Islamic

=== List ===
Date	Name		Remarks
Date	English	Bengali	Remarks
1 January	New Year's Day	ইংরেজি নববর্ষ	
27 Rajab	Lailat al Miraj	শবে মেরাজ	
5 Magha	Vasant Panchami	সরস্বতী পূজা	
46 days before Easter Sunday	Ash Wednesday	ভস্ম বুধবার	
First full moon in Magha	Magha Purnima	মাঘী পূর্ণিমা	
First full moon in Phalguna	Holi	দোলযাত্রা	
3 days before Easter Sunday	Maundy Thursday	পূণ্য বৃহস্পতিবার	
Friday before Easter Sunday	Good Friday	পূণ্য শুক্রবার	
The day before Easter Sunday	Holy Saturday	পূণ্য শনিবার	
March–April	Easter Sunday	পুনরুত্থান পার্বণ	
13th day of Krishna Paksha in Chaitra	Birthday of Harichand Thakur	হরিচাঁদ ঠাকুরের আবির্ভাব উৎসব	
3 Shawwal	3rd day of Eid al-Fitr	ঈদুল ফিতরের তৃতীয় দিন	
1 Chaitra	Mesha Sankranti	চৈত্র সংক্রান্তি	
1 Baishakh	Baishabi	বৈসাবি	For employees belonging to minority groups working in Chittagong Hill Tracts and beyond.
14 Magha	Maha Shivaratri	শিবরাত্রি ব্রত	
12 Dhu al-Hijjah	3rd day of Eid al-Adha	ঈদুল আজহার তৃতীয় দিন	
First full moon in Ashada	Ashadi Purnima	আষাঢ়ী পূর্ণিমা	
Last wednesday in Safar	Akhiri Chahar Shambah	আখেরি চাহার সোম্বা	
First full moon in Bhadra	Madhu Purnima	মধু পূর্ণিমা	
15/16 Bhadra	Mahalaya	মহালয়া	
8 Ashvin	Durga Ashtami	অষ্টমী	
9 Ashvin	Navaratri	নবমী	
10 Ashvin	Vijayadashami	বিজয়া দশমী	
11 Rabi' al-Thani	Fateha-e-Yazdaham	ফাতেহা-ই-ইয়াজদাহম	
Full moon in Ashvin	Pavarana	প্রবারণা পূর্ণিমা	
15 Kartika	Lakshmi Puja	লক্ষ্মী পূজা	
15 Kartika	Kali Puja	কালী পূজা	
15 Kartika	Kali Puja	কালী পূজা	
24 December	Yesterday of Christmas	যিশু খ্রিষ্টের জন্মোৎসব	
26 December	Next day of Christmas	যিশু খ্রিষ্টের জন্মোৎসব	

== Former holidays ==
Date	Name		Remarks	Source
Date	English	Bengali	Remarks	Source
17 March	Birthday of Sheikh Mujibur Rahman	শেখ মুজিবুর রহমানের জন্মদিন	Sheikh Mujibur Rahman's Birthday and National Children's Day.	
15 August	National Mourning Day	জাতীয় শোক দিবস	Assassination of Sheikh Mujibur Rahman	

== See also ==
- List of festivals in Bangladesh
- List of countries by number of public holidays
