= Birthday of Sheikh Mujibur Rahman =

Former Public holiday in Bangladesh

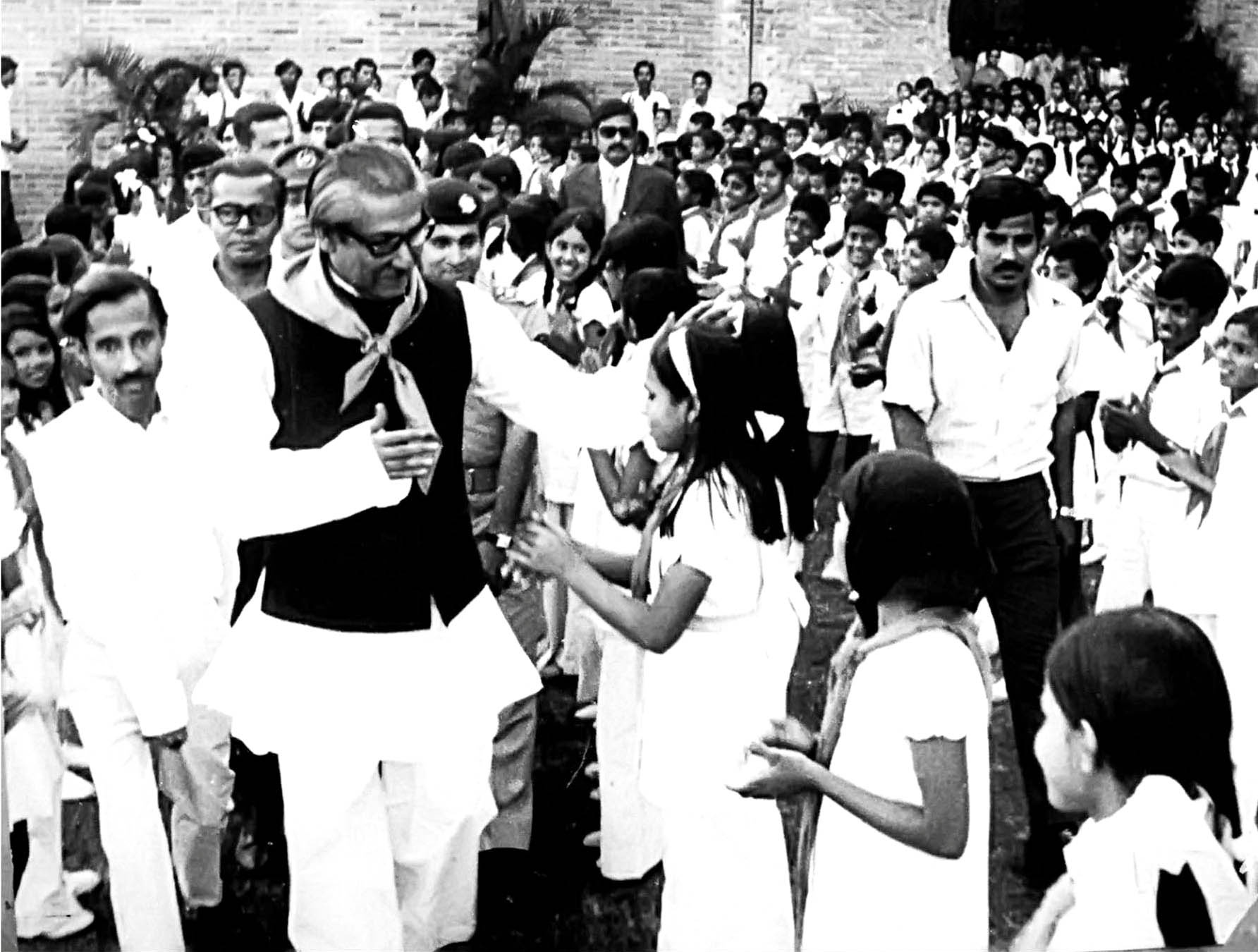
- Bangabandhu Sheikh Mujib among children at Ganabhaban, on his last birthday during his lifetime, 17 March 1975
- Official name: Birth anniversary of Father of the Nation Bangabandhu Sheikh Mujibur Rahman
- Also called: Bangabandhu's birthday
- Observed by: Bangladesh
- Type: Historic
- Significance: Honours Sheikh Mujibur Rahman, the founder and first president of Bangladesh
- Date: 17 March
- Frequency: Annual
- First time: 1967
- Related to: National Children's Day

The birthday of Sheikh Mujibur Rahman, commonly known as Bangabandhu's birthday, is a former public holiday in Bangladesh which is observed annually on 17 March to celebrate the birth of Sheikh Mujibur Rahman (also known as Bangabandhu, lit. 'friend of Bengal'). He was the founding president of Bangladesh.

A former public holiday, commemorations began during Mujib's lifetime in 1967 and have continued ever since. The holiday was primarily observed by the government and Bangladeshi citizens, and the national flag is flown from private and public buildings.

== History ==
=== Before independence ===
Sheikh Mujibur Rahman was the first president of Bangladesh. He was born on 17 March 1920 in Tungipara in the Bengal Presidency of British India. (Note: His Pakistani passport has a date of birth of 9 September 1921.) In 1967, Bangabandhu was incarcerated in Dacca's Central Jail. His birthday was celebrated that year by the provincial branch of the Awami League in Dacca (present-day Dhaka, Bangladesh) and the party organized prayer ceremonies in Chittagong. Rahman's family and politicians visited him that day, and a cake was sent to the jail by his party. Before independence, he spent eight birthdays in jail.

His birthday in 1971 was during East Pakistan's non-cooperation movement. Bangabandhu spent the day meeting Pakistani president Yahya Khan before meeting foreign journalists and returning to his residence, where his birthday was celebrated. In the afternoon, prayers were said for him at Baitul Mukarram under the leadership of Islamic scholar Obaidullah bin Syed Jalalabadi. That day, provincial assembly member and Awami League member Mohammad Abul Khayer gave Bangabandhu a phonograph record of his 7 March speech as a birthday gift.

=== After independence ===
After East Pakistan became independent as the People's Republic of Bangladesh in 1972, Bangabandhu's birthday was a public holiday to honor a scheduled visit to Bangladesh by Indian prime minister Indira Gandhi. The day was declared as "the day for hard work and dedication to the greater good". Gandhi gave Bangabandhu birthday presents during her visit and finance minister Tajuddin Ahmad wished him a long life. A program was organized, attended by University of Dhaka vice-chancellor Muzaffar Ahmed Chowdhury. The Chhatra League, the Awami League's student wing, distributed greeting cards as a birthday tribute. A number of political organizations celebrated his birthday in 1973.

On Bangabandhu's 55th birthday in 1975, 50,000 people gathered in front of his residence at 6 a.m. with gifts and a 55-pound (25 kg) cake was ordered by the Bangladesh Krishak Sramik Awami League (BAKSAL). (Note: In 1975, Bangabandhu's Awami League became part of the short-lived BAKSAL.) He and his family were assassinated on 15 August of that year. According to a Bangla Tribune research analysis, little news about Bangabandhu's birthday celebrations were published from 1976 to 1990. Until 1995, the Awami League and its organisations faced difficulties in celebrating Bangabandhu's birthday. In 1993, educator Nilima Ibrahim proposed observing Bangabandhu's birthday as a children's day at the national convention of the Bangabandhu Shishu-Kishor. The following year, Children's Day was unofficially celebrated on 17 March.

The first Hasina ministry officially observed Bangabandhu's birthday as Children's Day in 1997. In 2001, under the third Khaleda ministry, the holiday was abolished. It was declared a public holiday again as Bangabandhu's birthday and Children's Day in 2009, and was celebrated by the second Hasina ministry in 2010. In 2020, the government declared Mujib Year for the centennial of his birth. Three years later, flying the Bangladeshi flag on Bangabandhu's birthday became mandatory. In 2024, the Yunus ministry removed it from the list of public holidays. In 2025, as a result of the ban protests, the government imposed restrictions on the activities of the Awami League. The following year, the party observed the birthday in a modest manner. The party's leaders and activists primarily celebrated the day through online-based activities. Apart from a flash procession by the banned Chhatra League in Faridpur, no other programs were observed in the country on the occasion.

== Observance ==
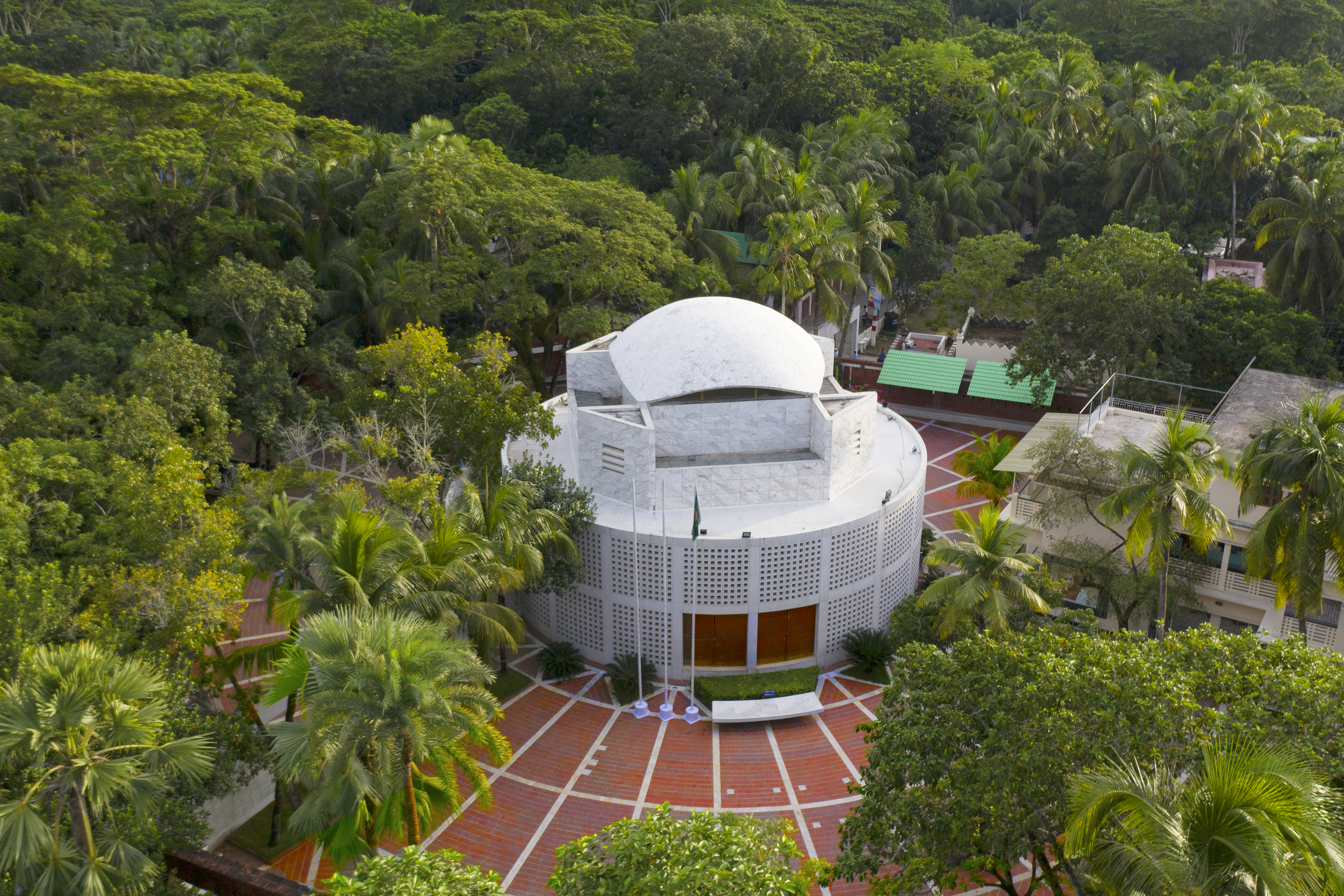
The Mausoleum of Sheikh Mujibur Rahman

Bangabandhu's birthday is a popular holiday throughout Bangladesh, and programs were organized in 2019 (including in Tungipara, his birthplace). The president and prime minister paid their respects at the Bangabandhu Memorial Museum (his former residence) in Dhaka and at his mausoleum in Tungipara. Free medical services were provided in the country's government-run hospitals, radio and television channels broadcast special programs, the Islamic Foundation Bangladesh organized prayer meetings and Quran recitations, and the Awami League held discussion meetings.

== Publications ==
On 8 March 2022, the Press Institute Bangladesh published a book titled "Songbadpotre Bongbondhur Jonmodin" which is a collection of news articles about his birthday from 1972-1975.
