= National Mourning Day (Bangladesh) =

Remembering 1975 assassination of Sheikh Mujibur Rahman

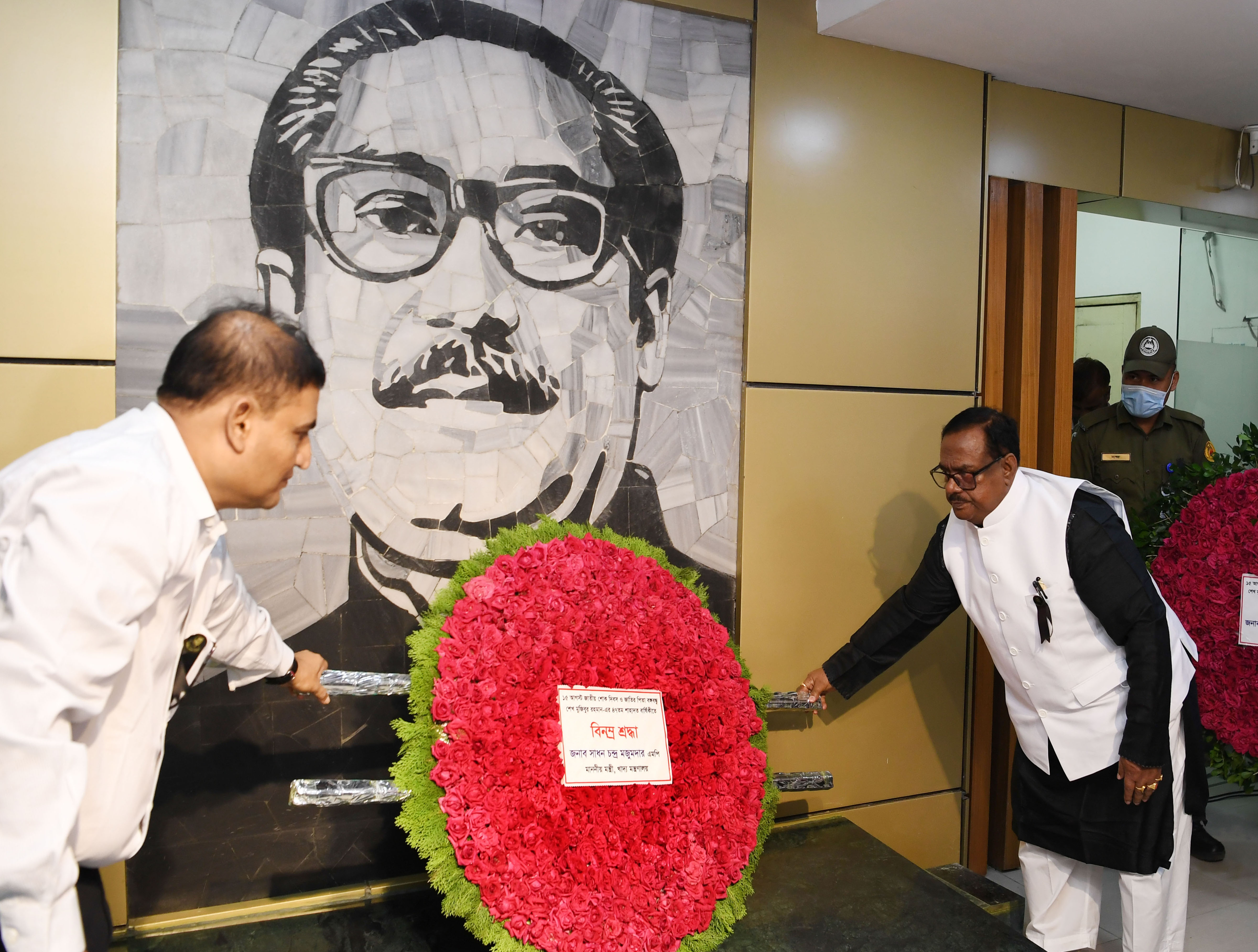
- Also called: জাতীয় শোক দিবস
- Observed by: Bangladesh
- Liturgical color: Black
- Significance: To honour those who died during the assassination of Sheikh Mujibur Rahman
- Date: 15 August
- First time: 1976 (50 years ago); 1996 (Officially)

National Mourning Day was a commemorative day in Bangladesh which began in 1976. It was once a public holiday.

== History ==
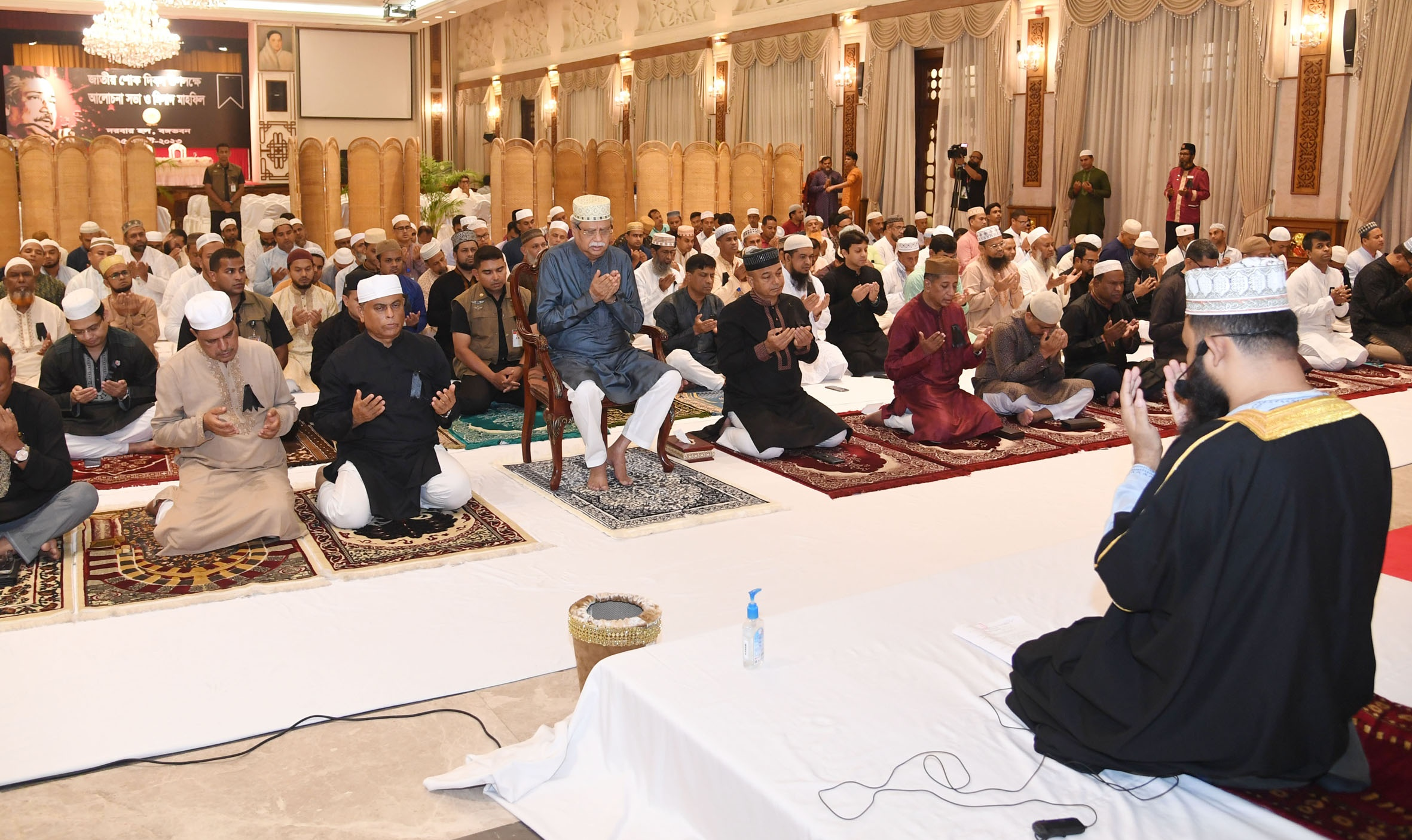
Prayer at Bangabhaban (Presidential palace) during the commemoration of the day

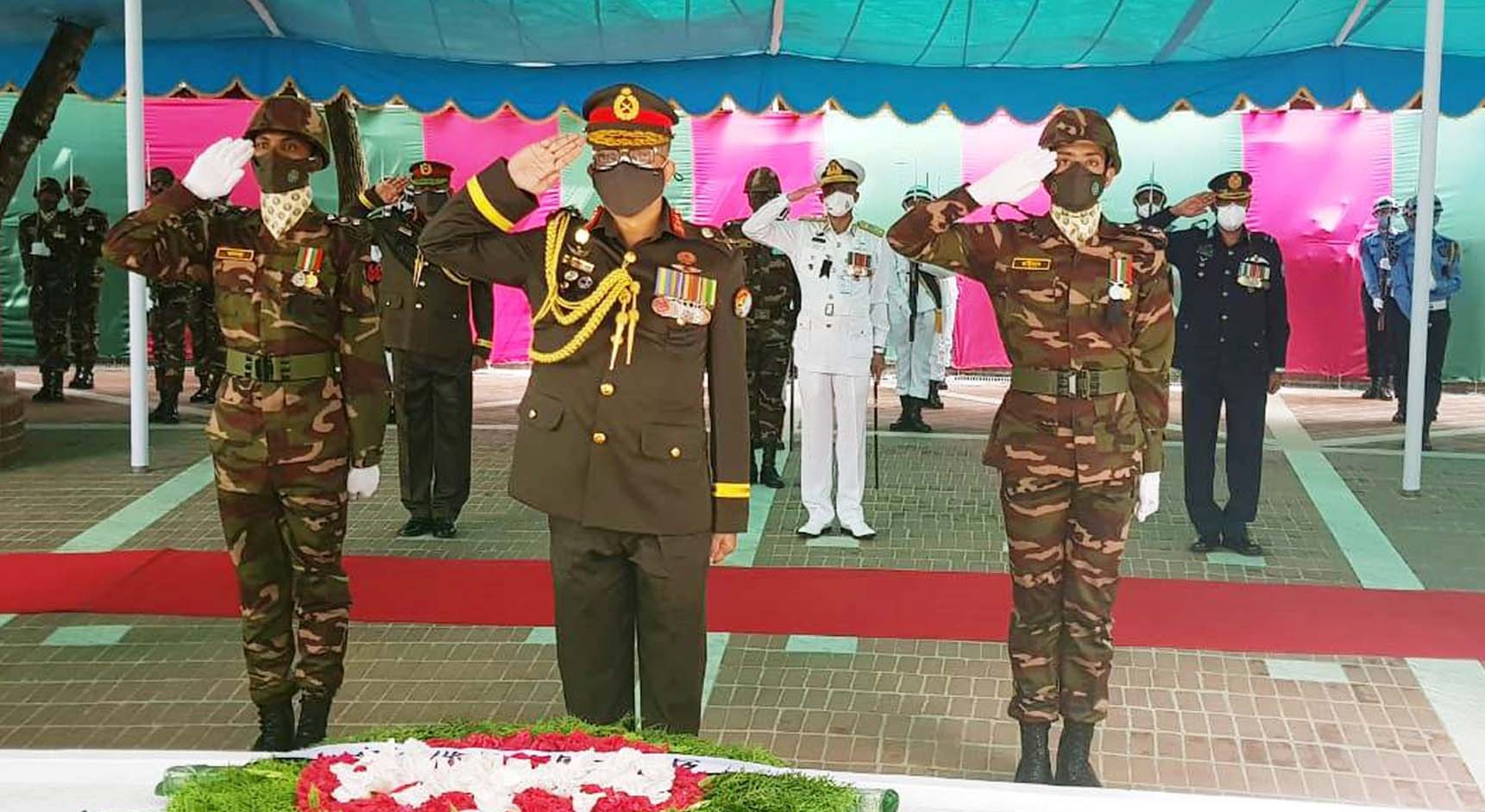
Military ceremony at the Mausoleum of Sheikh Mujibur Rahman marking the day

On 15 August 1975, the first president of independent Bangladesh and Father of the Nation, Sheikh Mujibur Rahman (also known as Bangabandhu), was assassinated by a group of army personnel at his house in Dhanmondi, Dhaka. His wife Bangamata Begum Fazilatunnesa Mujib was also killed that day, and 16 more people were killed along with their family members and relatives.

To commemorate the day, the National Mourning Day was declared for the first time at a student rally held at the south gate of Baitul Mukarram National Mosque on 5 November 1975, following the funeral prayers of four national leaders and Bangabandhu. Ignoring the special military decree issued on 5 August 1976, student leaders took the initiative to pay homage to Sheikh Mujibur Rahman on 15 August 1976, the first death anniversary of Sheikh Mujib, at organized a Milad ceremony at Dhaka University Mosque. With a large number of students present, prayers were offered at the Milad ceremony at Dhaka University Mosque, seeking the peace of the souls of Bangabandhu and his family members. However, when they tried to enter Dhanmondi Road No. 32, the police blocked them. Following this, students threw flowers so that they would float in the water of Dhanmondi Lake adjacent to the road towards the Bangabandhu House. On the same day, initiatives were taken to hold a Milad Mahfil, Quran Khatam, Doa-Monajat at Shaheed Ashuranjan Hostel of Haji Asmat College in Bhairab, Kishoreganj, and a Dua Mahfil at the town hall in Jessore. The police prevented the Milad Mahfil in Kishoreganj and 22 people were arrested for disobeying the military order. They were all released sporadically within a year.

In 1996, Prime Minister Sheikh Hasina established the national day of remembrance via executive ordinance, which was later ratified by her parliament in a bill. Government officials commemorated the day by laying wreaths, making speeches, and attending special prayers.

== Controversies ==
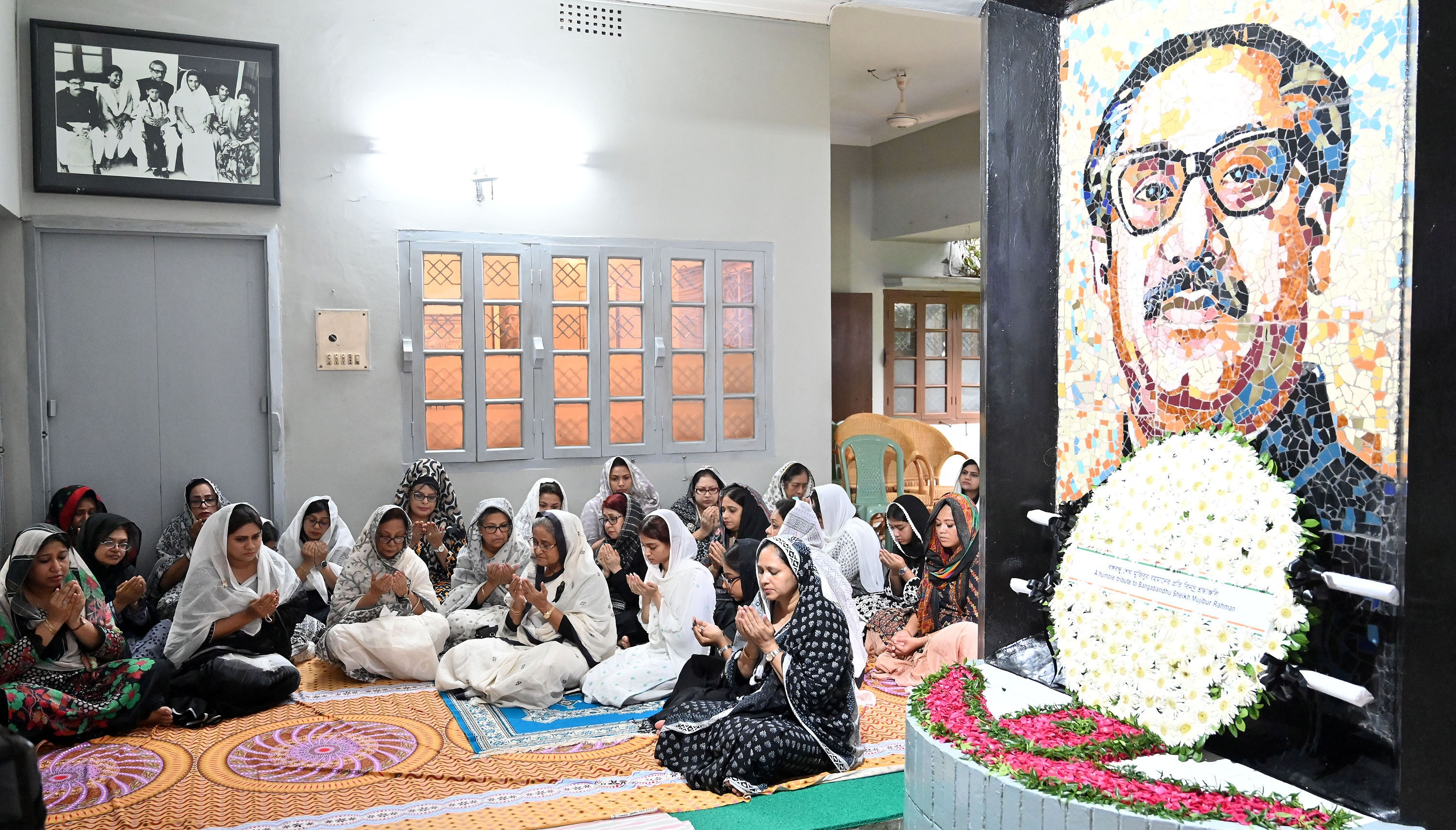
Sheikh Hasina along others praying at the assassination site (now ruined) on the day

When an opposing party, the Bangladesh Nationalist Party (BNP), came into power in 2001, they reversed the bill. Awami League (AL) stalwarts continued to observe the anniversary, but without government recognition. In 2008, the caretaker government reintroduced the holiday. Sociologist Hasanuzzaman Chowdhury wrote that Khaleda Zia, leader of the BNP and former prime minister, appeared to shift the observance of her birthday to 15 August to defy the AL and mock the commemoration.

On 13 August 2024, the interim government led by Muhammad Yunus cancelled the holiday and its observation following consultations with various political parties. Prior to that, student organisations that spearheaded the 2024 quota reform movement, and the Non-Cooperation Movement that led to the resignation of Sheikh Hasina from power, had criticised the event as having become "a political and cultural symbol of the party".

The government had made it compulsory for schools and other public institutions to observe the holiday, and granted universities funds to organize events on the day.

Anthropologist Mascha Schultz claimed a striking absence of the general public (those not involved in politics or obligated to attend) from commemoration events.
