= Abul Hasan (poet) =

Bangladeshi poet and journalist

- আবুল হাসান
- Born: Abul Hossain Miah; 4 August 1947; Faridpur District, Bengal Province, British India
- Died: 26 November 1975 (aged 28); Dhaka, Bangladesh
- Occupations: Poet, journalist
- Awards: Bangla Academy Literary Award (1975); Ekushey Padak (1982)

Abul Hossain Miah (known by his pen name Abul Hasan; 1947 – 26 November 1975) was a Bangladeshi poet and journalist.

== Early life ==
Abul was born at Barnigram in Tungipara, Gopalganj Mahakuma, Faridpur District, on 4 August 1947. He was admitted to the University of Dhaka to study English with honours, but could not complete his studies. Instead, he joined the news section of the Ittefaq in 1969. Subsequently, he became assistant editor of the Ganabangla (1972–1973) and Dainik Janapad (1973–1974).

== Literary works ==
Hasan, who came first in the Asian Poetry Competition held in 1970, occupies an important place in modern Bengali poetry, though he wrote for only a decade. His poems reflect feelings of grief, self-abnegation, and loneliness. They are preoccupied with visions of death and ideas of separation. Among his volumes of poems is Raja Jaay Raja Ase (1972), Je Tumi Horon Koro (1974) and Prithok Palongko (1975). The poetic play Ora Kayekjan (1988) and Abul Hasaner Galpa Sanggraha (1990) were published after his death. He received the Bangla Academy Literary Award (1975) for poetry and the Ekushey Padak (1982) posthumously.

== Death ==
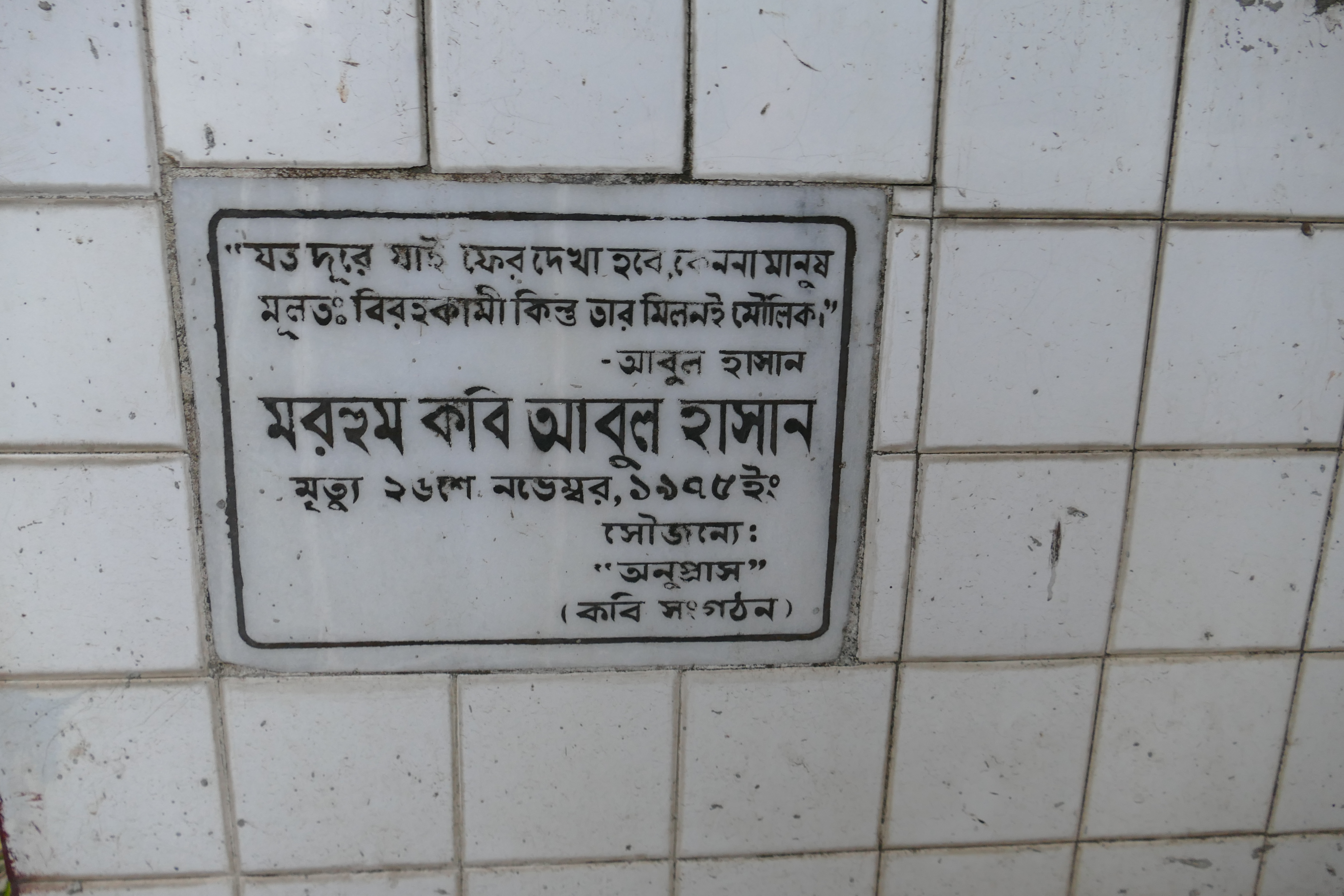
Gravestone of Hasan in Banani Graveyard, Dhaka

Hasan died on 26 November 1975 at PG Hospital (now Bangabandhu Sheikh Mujib Medical University) due to long-standing heart problems.
