= Ehsan Khan (architect) =

Bangladeshi architect

- এহসান খান
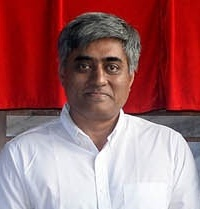
- Khan in 2016
- Born: 1 October 1964 (age 61); Mymensingh, East Pakistan
- Education: Bangladesh University of Engineering and Technology; Ananda Mohan College; Mymensingh Zilla School
- Occupation: Architect
- Awards: IAB Award
- Practice: Ehsan Khan - EK Architects
- Buildings: Nishorgo Oirabot Nature Interpretation Centre; Mausoleum of Bangabandhu; Mahila Samity complex Institute of architects (IAB Center) complex Shanta Forum, Skymark, Shanta Pinnacle

Ehsan Khan (Bengali: এহসান খান) is a Bangladeshi architect and urban designer.

== Early life and education ==
Khan was born in Natakghar Lane area of Mymensingh city. His father Yusuf Khan was a businessman and his mother Sobeh Akhtar was a homemaker. Khan is the second of four siblings. He passed SSC from Mymensingh Zilla School in 1980. He passed HSC from Ananda Mohan College, Mymensingh in 1983 and was admitted to the Department of Architecture in BUET. Khan received his bachelor's degree in architecture from Bangladesh University of Engineering and Technology in 1991.

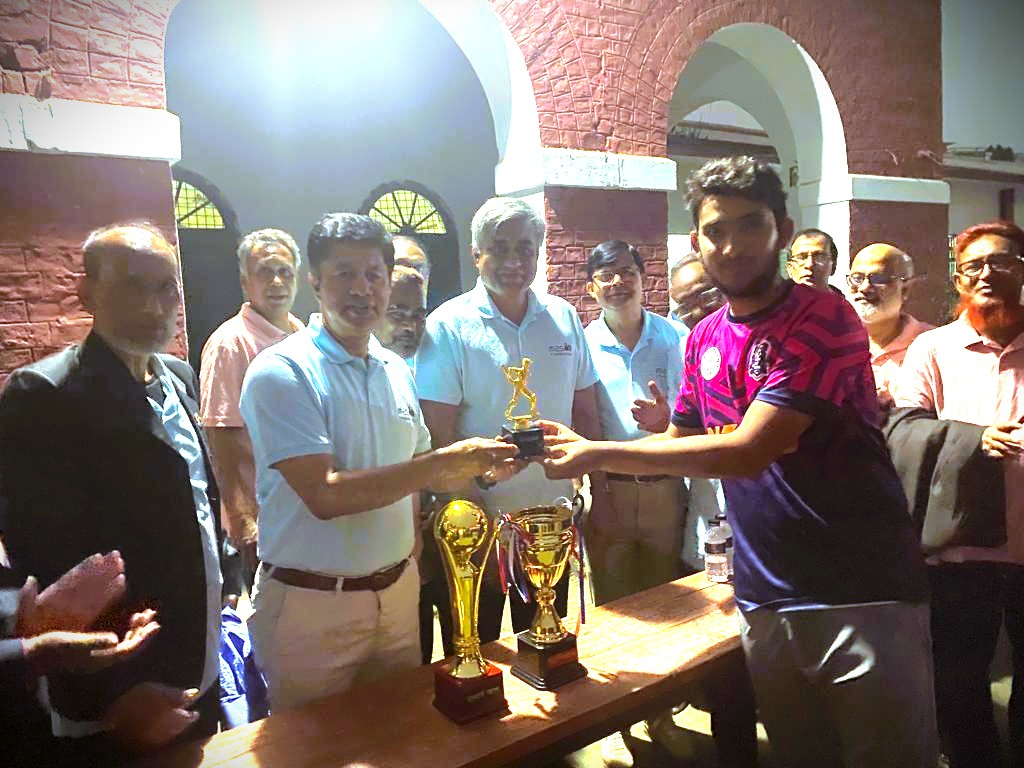
Khan with Anwarul Momen at Mymensingh Zilla School, 2023

== Career ==
Khan completed his bachelor of architecture from Bangladesh University of Engineering and Technology. He designed the mausoleum of Sheikh Mujibur Rahman at Gopalgonj. He was nominated for an Aga Khan Award for Architecture in 2010 for designing the Nishorgo Oirabot Nature Interpretation Centre. winner of Arcasia award for Bangladesh Mahila Samity complex and Institute of architects (IAB Center) complex.

== Notable works ==
- Nishorgo Oirabot Nature Interpretation Centre, Teknaf (2008)
- Mausoleum of Sheikh Mujibur Rahman

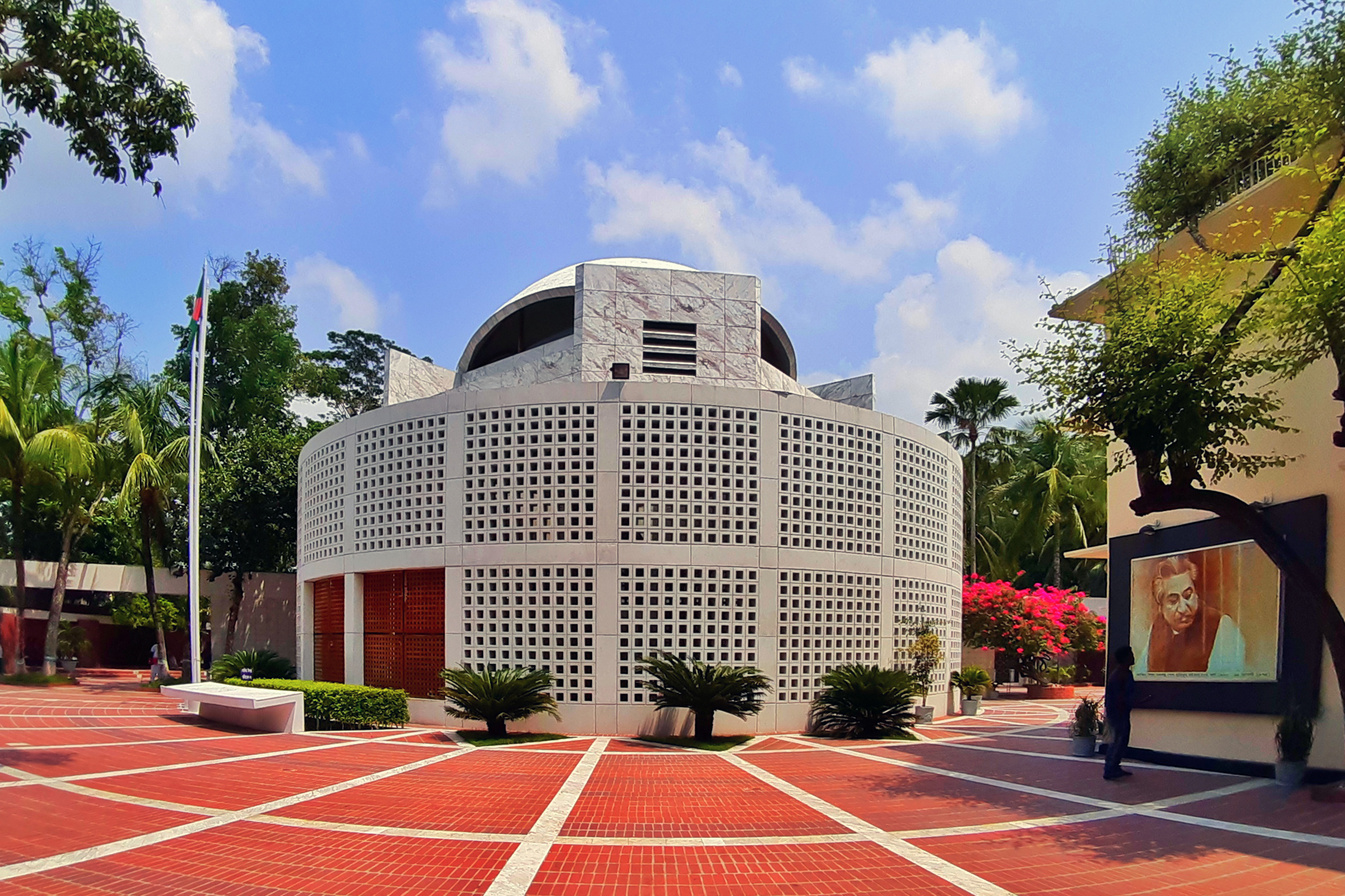
Mausoleum of Sheikh Mujibur Rahman

- Mahila Samity complex
- Institute of architects (IAB Center) complex
- Shanta Forum, Skymark, Shanta Pinnacle

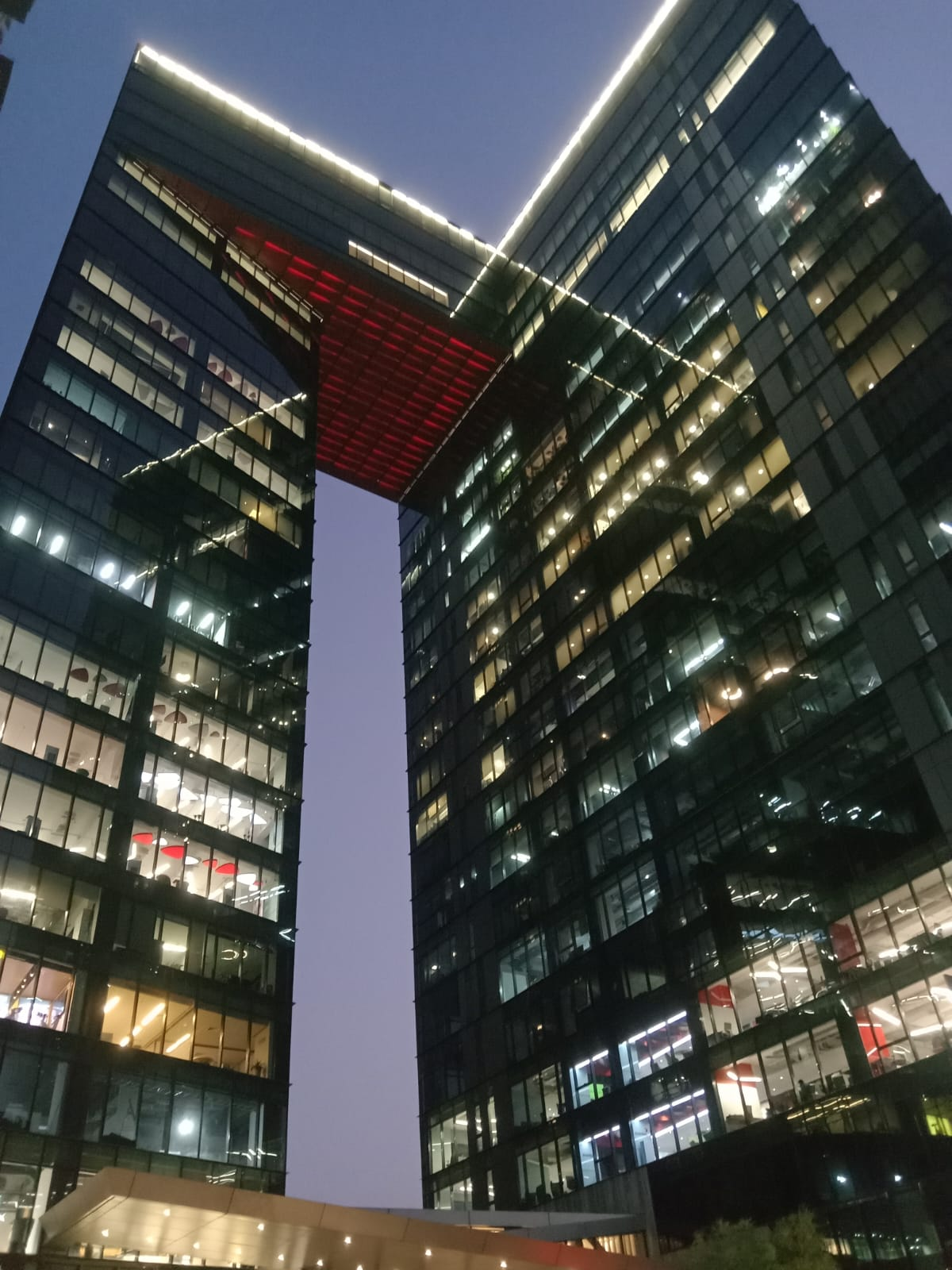
Shanta Forum, Tejgaon

- Integrated development Hatirjheel area

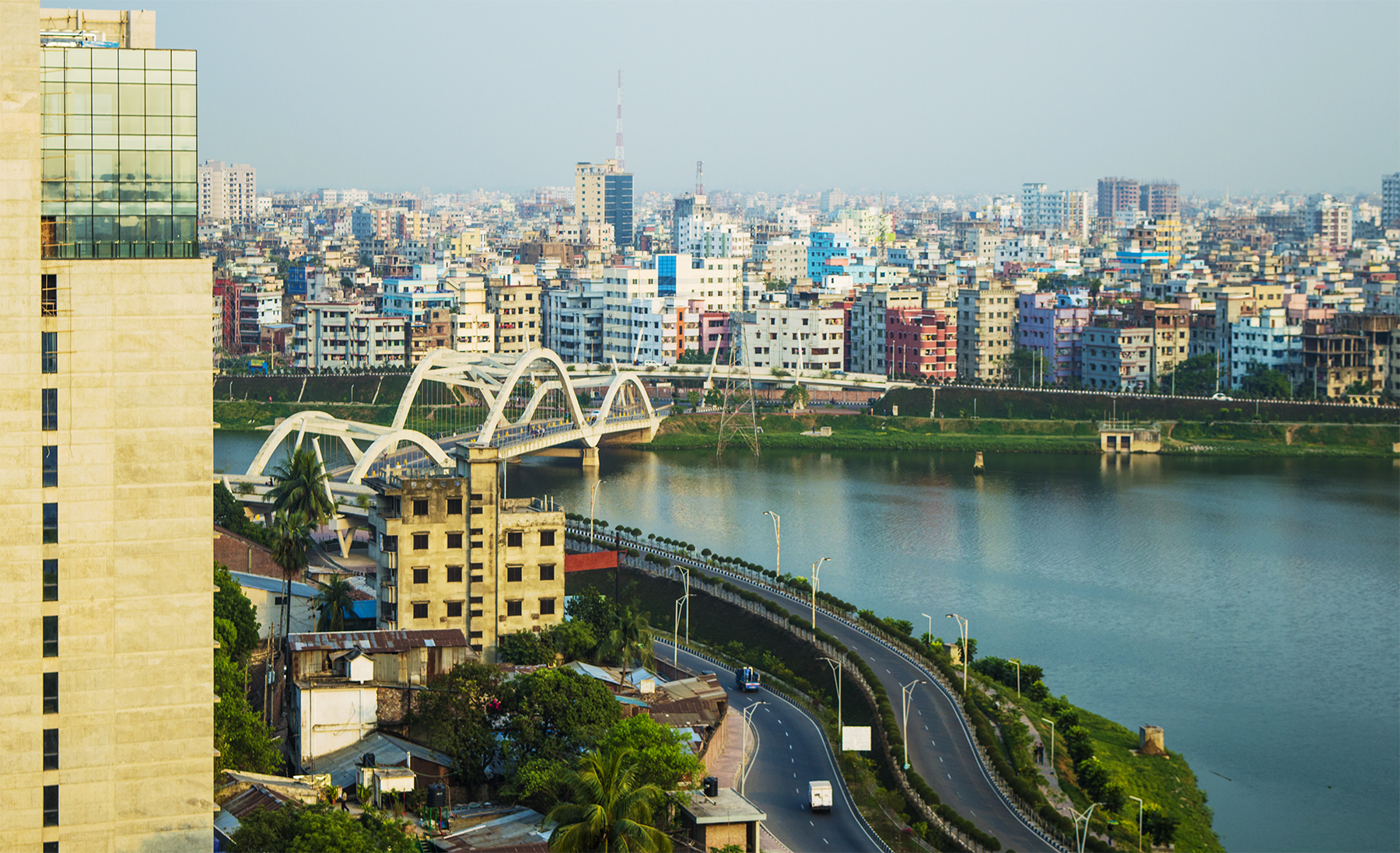
Hatirjheel

- Dhanmondi Lake development project
- Bangladesh Bhavana museum
- Masterplan for Cox’s Bazar District

== Awards ==
- Institute of Architects Bangladesh (IAB) Architect of the Year Award, for designing the mausoleum of Bangabandhu
- J.K. Cement Award for Architecture
- Arcasia award for Bangladesh Mahila Samity complex and Institute of architects (IAB Center) complex.
- Monsoon award for architecture by Indian Institute of Architects for Mahila Samity at Bailey Road, Dhaka.

== Personal life ==
He got married in 1995. Wife's name is Nusrat Jahan. She is also an architect. The couple are parents to two daughters.
