= Sheikh Jamal =

Bangladeshi military personnel and athlete (1954–1975)

- শেখ জামাল
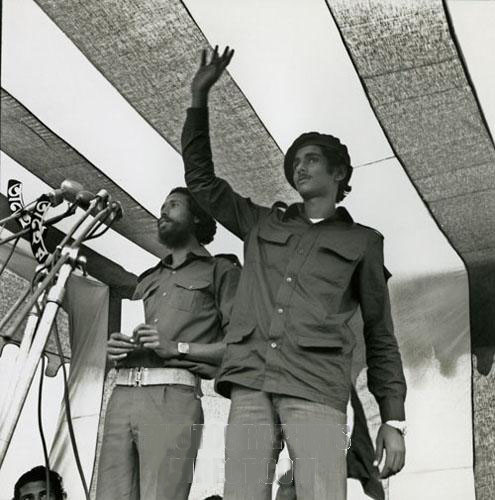
- Kader Siddiqui (left) and Sheikh Jamal (right) at the first public meeting after liberation in Polton, Dhaka (1971)
- Born: 28 April 1954; Tungipara, East Bengal, Pakistan
- Died: 15 August 1975 (aged 21); Dacca, Bangladesh
- Cause of death: Assassination
- Burial place: Banani Graveyard, Dhaka
- Alma mater: Military Academy of the University of Defence; Royal Military Academy Sandhurst
- Spouse: Parveen Jamal Rosy (m. 1975)
- Relatives: See Tungipara Sheikh family
- Military career
- Allegiance: Bangladesh
- Branch: Mukti Bahini; Bangladesh Army
- Service years: 1971–1975
- Rank: Lieutenant
- Unit: East Bengal Regiment
- Conflicts: Bangladesh Liberation War
- Awards: National Sports Award

Sheikh Jamal (28 April 1954 – 15 August 1975) was a Bangladeshi military personnel and athlete. He was the second son of Sheikh Fazilatunnesa Mujib and Sheikh Mujibur Rahman, the founding president of Bangladesh.

== Early life ==
Jamal was born at Tungipara, Gopalganj on 28 April 1954. He was Mujib's third child out of five. His sister, Sheikh Hasina, would become prime minister of Bangladesh in 1996.

Jamal studied at BAF Shaheen College Dhaka and finished his matriculation from Dhaka Residential Model College. He passed his HSC from Dhaka College. He learned playing guitar at a music institution and was also a good cricketer.

== Career ==
Detained with his mother and other members of the family at a house in Dhanmondi during the war of Liberation in 1971, Jamal found the means to escape and cross over to a liberated zone, where he joined the struggle to free the country.

While a student of Dhaka College, Jamal traveled to Yugoslavia for military training at the Military Academy of the University of Defence, Belgrade. Subsequently, he trained at the Royal Military Academy Sandhurst in Great Britain. He joined the Bangladesh Army as a second lieutenant in the East Bengal Regiment.

== Death and legacy ==
He was married to his paternal first cousin Parveen Jamal Rosy (1956–1975) on 17 July 1975. Jamal's father and Rosy's mother were siblings.

Jamal and his wife Rosy were killed along with other members of his family (parents, brothers, uncle, sister-in-law) during the assassination of Sheikh Mujibur Rahman. The professional sports club Sheikh Jamal Dhanmondi Club and Sheikh Jamal Stadium in Faridpur town are named after him.
