= Sheikh Fazilatunnesa Mujib =

First Lady of Bangladesh (1971–1972, 1975)

Begum Sheikh Fazilatunnesa Mujib শেখ ফজিলাতুন্নেছা মুজিব
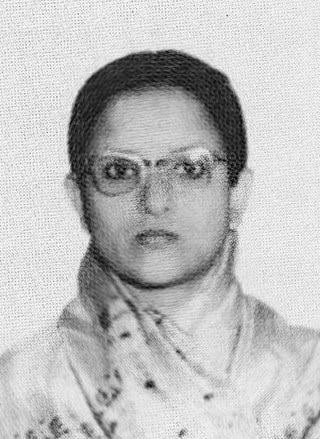
- Fazilatunnesa in 1955

1st First Lady of Bangladesh
- In role 25 January 1975 – 15 August 1975
- President: Sheikh Mujibur Rahman
- Succeeded by: Anwara Begum
- In role 11 April 1971 – 12 January 1972
- President: Sheikh Mujibur Rahman
- Preceded by: Position established
- Succeeded by: Begum Khurshid Chowdhury

Spouse of the Prime Minister of Bangladesh
- In office 12 January 1972 – 25 January 1975
- Prime Minister: Sheikh Mujibur Rahman
- Preceded by: Syeda Zohra Tajuddin
- Succeeded by: Begum Amina Mansur

Personal details
- Born: Begum Fazilatunnesa; 8 August 1930 Tungipara, Bengal, British India
- Died: 15 August 1975 (aged 45) Dacca, Bangladesh
- Cause of death: Assassination by firearm
- Resting place: Banani graveyard
- Spouse: Sheikh Mujibur Rahman (m. 1938)
- Children: Hasina; Kamal; Jamal; Rehana; Russel
- Relatives: See Tungipara Sheikh family
- Awards: Independence Day Award

Begum Sheikh Fazilatunnesa Mujib (Note: Bengali: বেগম শেখ ফজিলাতুন নেছা মুজিব, romanized: Bēgom Śēkh Fôjilātun Nēsā Mujib [ˈbeɡɔm ˈʃeːkʰ ˈfɔd͡ʒɪlatun ˈnesaː ˈmudʒɪb] Urdu: بیگم شیخ فضیلت النساء مجیب, romanized: Bēgam Shaykh Fazīlat-un-Nisā Mujib) (8 August 1930 – 15 August 1975), (Note: Sources:) commonly known as Begum Mujib and also known by her nickname Renu (Note: Bengali: রেনু) was the wife of Sheikh Mujibur Rahman, the founding president of Bangladesh.

She was the mother of Sheikh Hasina, the leader of the Awami League and former prime minister of Bangladesh. She was killed along with her family in 1975.

== Early life and marriage ==
Sheikh Fazilatunnesa was born in 1930, to the Bengali Muslim Sheikh family in the village of Tungipara, Gopalganj. Her father was Sheikh Zahurul Haque, and her mother Sheikh Husne Ara Begum. Her paternal grandfather, Sheikh Kashem, was grandson of Ekramullah Sheikh, who was descended from Sheikh Abdul Awal Dervish, a dervish who had come to preach Islam in Bengal. Her father, Sheikh Zahurul Haque, and mother, Husne Ara Begum, died when she was three years old. Her elder sister's name is Sheikh Jinnatunnesa.

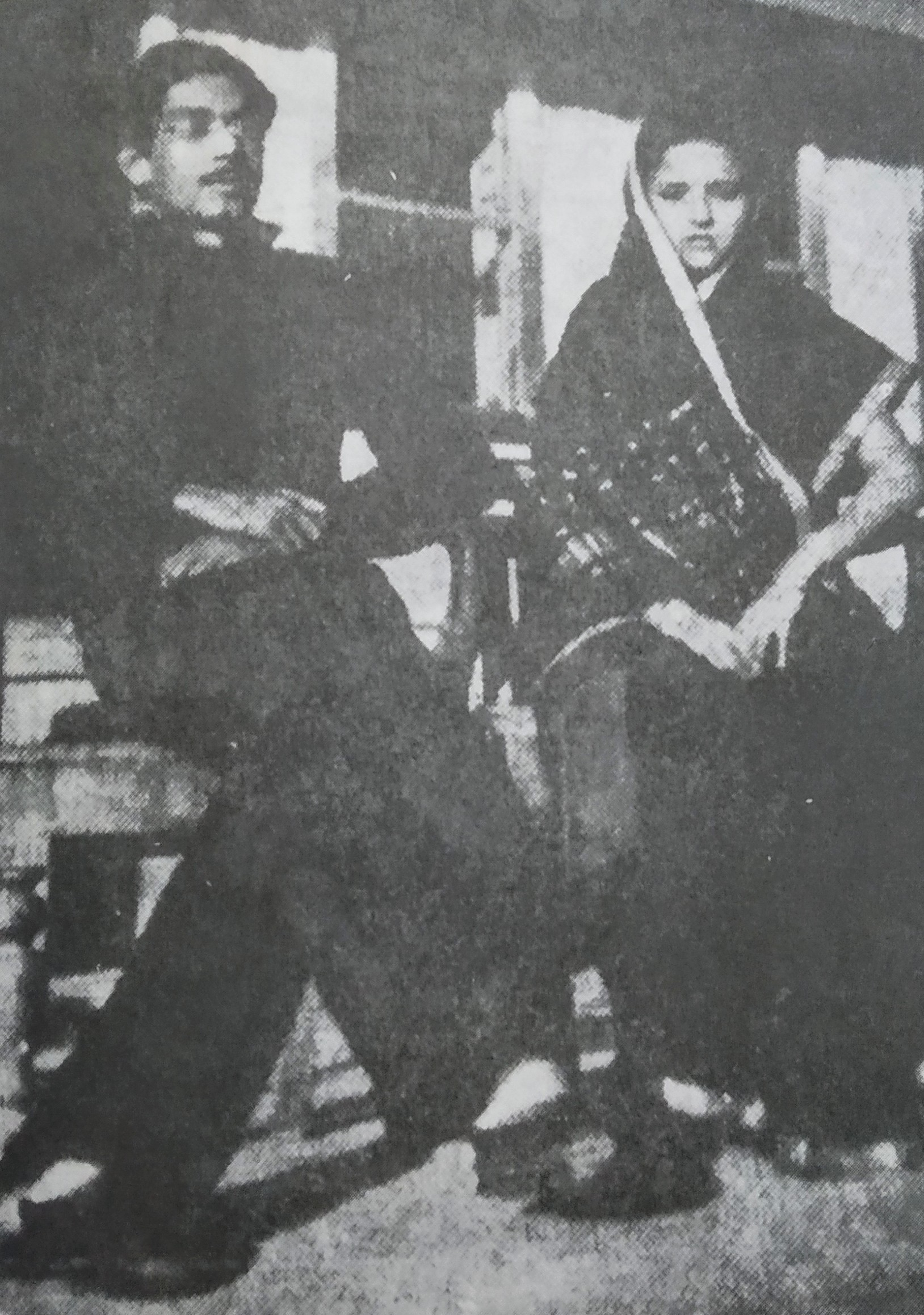
Fazilatunnesa with her husband Sheikh Mujib in 1947

Fazilatunnesa was a paternal cousin of her husband Sheikh Mujibur Rahman. When she was only 3 and Rahman was 13, their marriage had been fixed by elders in the family. She was only 8 years old when she was married to her husband, who himself was just 18, in 1938.(This was a common tradition back in the day) The couple later had two daughters Sheikh Hasina and Sheikh Rehana, as well as three sons Sheikh Kamal, Sheikh Jamal and Sheikh Russel. Fazilatunnesa Mujib was under house arrest during Bangladesh Liberation War until 17 December.

== Death ==
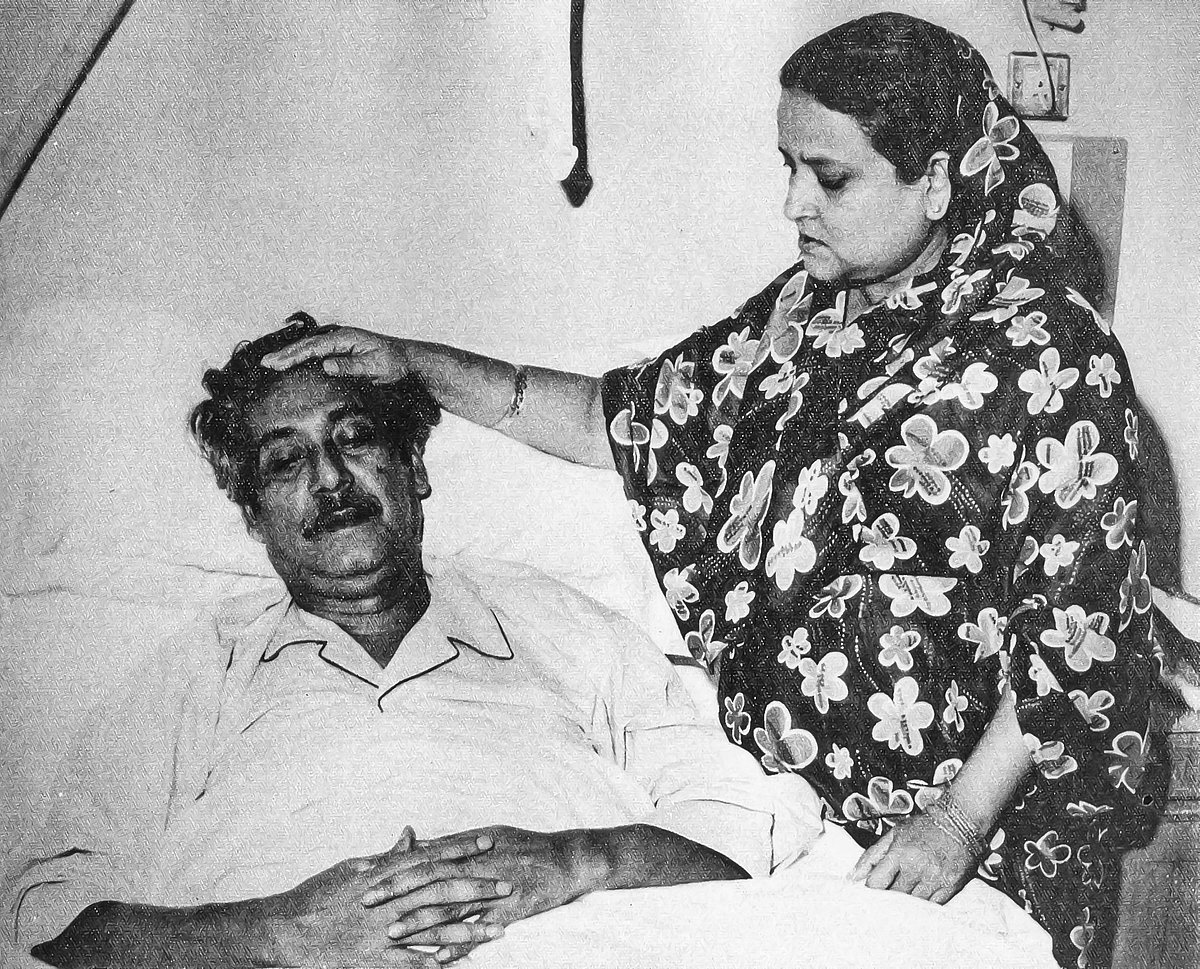
Fazilatunnesa with Sheikh Mujib

On 15 August 1975, a group of junior army officers attacked the presidential residence with tanks and assassinated Mujib, his family and personal staff. Only her daughters Sheikh Hasina and Sheikh Rehana, who were visiting West Germany, escaped. They were banned from returning to Bangladesh. Others killed included Fazilatunnesa's 10-year-old son Sheikh Russel, two other sons Sheikh Kamal, Sheikh Jamal, daughters-in-law Sultana Kamal and Parveen Jamal Rosy (who was also her cousin's daughter), brother Abdur Rab Serniabat and brother-in-law Sheikh Abu Naser, nephew Sheikh Fazlul Haque Mani and his wife Arzoo Moni. The coup was planned by disgruntled Awami League colleagues and military officers, which included Mujib's colleague and former confidant Khondaker Mostaq Ahmad, who became his immediate successor. Lawrence Lifschultz has alleged that the CIA was involved in the coup and assassination, basing his assumption on statements by the then US ambassador in Dhaka, Eugene Booster.

Mujib's death plunged the nation into many years of political turmoil. The coup leaders were soon overthrown, and a series of counter-coups and political assassinations paralysed the country. Order was largely restored after a coup in 1977 gave control to the army chief Ziaur Rahman. Declaring himself President in 1978, Ziaur Rahman signed the Indemnity Ordinance, giving immunity from prosecution to the men who plotted Mujib's overthrow and assassination.

== Legacy ==
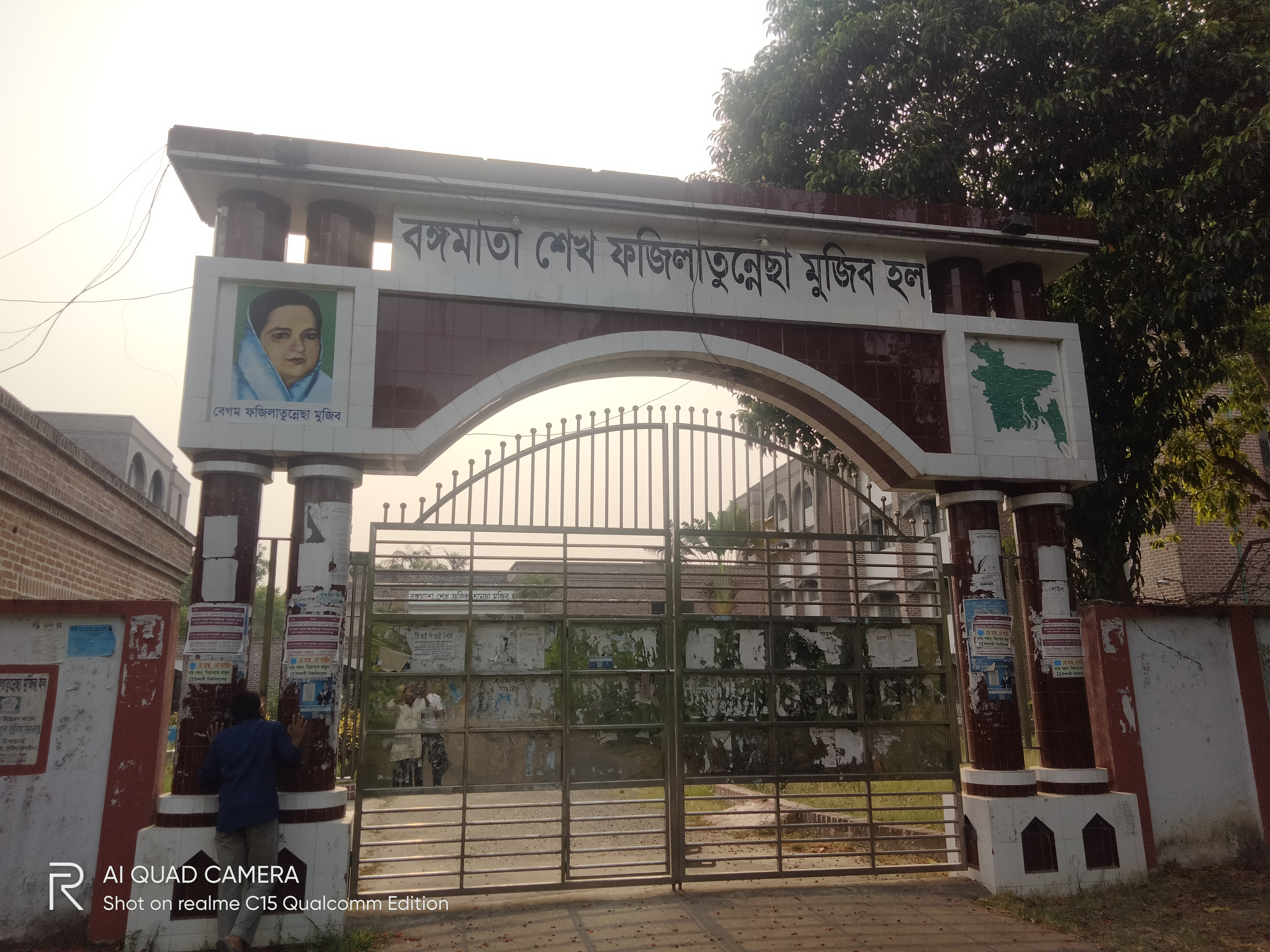
Fazilatunnesa Hall in Islamic University, Bangladesh

Bangabandhu Memorial Trust, in partnership with Malaysian hospital chain KPJ Healthcare, built the Sheikh Fazilatunnesa Mujib Memorial KPJ Specialised Hospital and Nursing College in her memory. A dormitory in Eden Mohila College is named after her. Sheikh Fazilatunnesa Mujib Hall is a female dorm in Rajshahi University. Govt. Sheikh Fazilatunnesa Mujib Mohila College is located in Tangail.

=== Portrayals ===
==== Television ====
- In 2007, a Bangladeshi television film on Sheikh Mujibur Rahman, "Palashi Theke Dhanmondi" (From Palashi to Dhanmondi), was released. Fazilatunnesa is portrayed by Laila Hasan.

==== Films ====
- In 2021, the Bangladeshi film "Tungiparar Miya Bhai" (Dear Brother of Tungipara) was released, depicting various notable events of the earlier life of Sheikh Mujibur Rahman from 1930 to 1952 during his lifetime. Fazilatunnesa is portrayed by Prarthana Fardin Dighi.
- In 2021, the Bangladeshi film "Chironjeeb Mujib" (Immortal Mujib), depicting the life of Sheikh Mujibur Rahman from 1949 to 1952, was released. Fazilatunnesa is portrayed by Dilara Hanif Purnima.
- In 2023, "Bangamata" (Mother of Bengal), a Bangladeshi short film on the life of Sheikh Fazilatunnesa Mujib, was released. It stars Jyotika Jyoti in the lead role as Sheikh Fazilatunnesa Mujib.
- In 2023, the Bangladesh-India joint production Mujib: The Making of a Nation, on the life of Sheikh Mujibur Rahman, was released. Fazilatunnesa is portrayed by Prarthana Fardin Dighi and Nusrat Imrose Tisha.
