= Tungipara =

Municipality in Gopalganj District, Bangladesh

Coordinates: 22°54′N 89°55′E

Tungipara (Bangla: টুঙ্গিপাড়া) is a municipality in Tungipara Upazila of Gopalganj District in Bangladesh. It is the birthplace of Sheikh Mujibur Rahman, who is considered as the founding leader of the Bangladesh. It has a population of 29, 424.

== History ==
Sheikh Tozammel Haque Tutul was the mayor of Tungipara municipality.

In December 2013, The Daily Star reported that the mayor of Tungipara, Sardar Issial Hossain, was using a government project car as a personal vehicle. A Jubo League leader locked the office of the Bangladesh Water Development Board which was later reopened by Mayor Sheikh Ahmad Hossan Mirja for not getting the contract for a tender in April 2017.
