= Sheikh family of Tungipara =

Bangladeshi political family

Sheikhs of Tungipara টুঙ্গিপাড়ার শেখ বংশ
- Political family
- Country: Bangladesh
- Current region: Bangladesh; India; United Kingdom
- Origin: Tungipara
- Founder: Sheikh Borhanuddin
- Current head: Sheikh Hasina
- Titles: Prime Minister of Bangladesh; President of Bangladesh
- Connected families: Khandakar Family of Kandirpar; Kazi Family of Tungipara; Serniabat Family; Chowdhuries of Duttapara; Khan Taluqdars of Bhola
- Distinctions: Leading the Bangladesh Awami League, the family itself is a Zamindar family of Faridpur
- Traditions: Sunni Islam
- Estate: Tungipara Sheikh Bari

The Tungipara Sheikh family (Bengali: টুঙ্গিপাড়ার শেখ বংশ, romanized: Ṭuṅgipāṛār śēkh bôngśô) is one of the two most prominent Bangladeshi political families, other being the Zia family. The family primarily consists of Sheikh Mujibur Rahman, Sheikh Hasina, Sheikh Rehana and their relatives. Their political involvement has traditionally revolved around the Bangladesh Awami League.

== Family origin ==
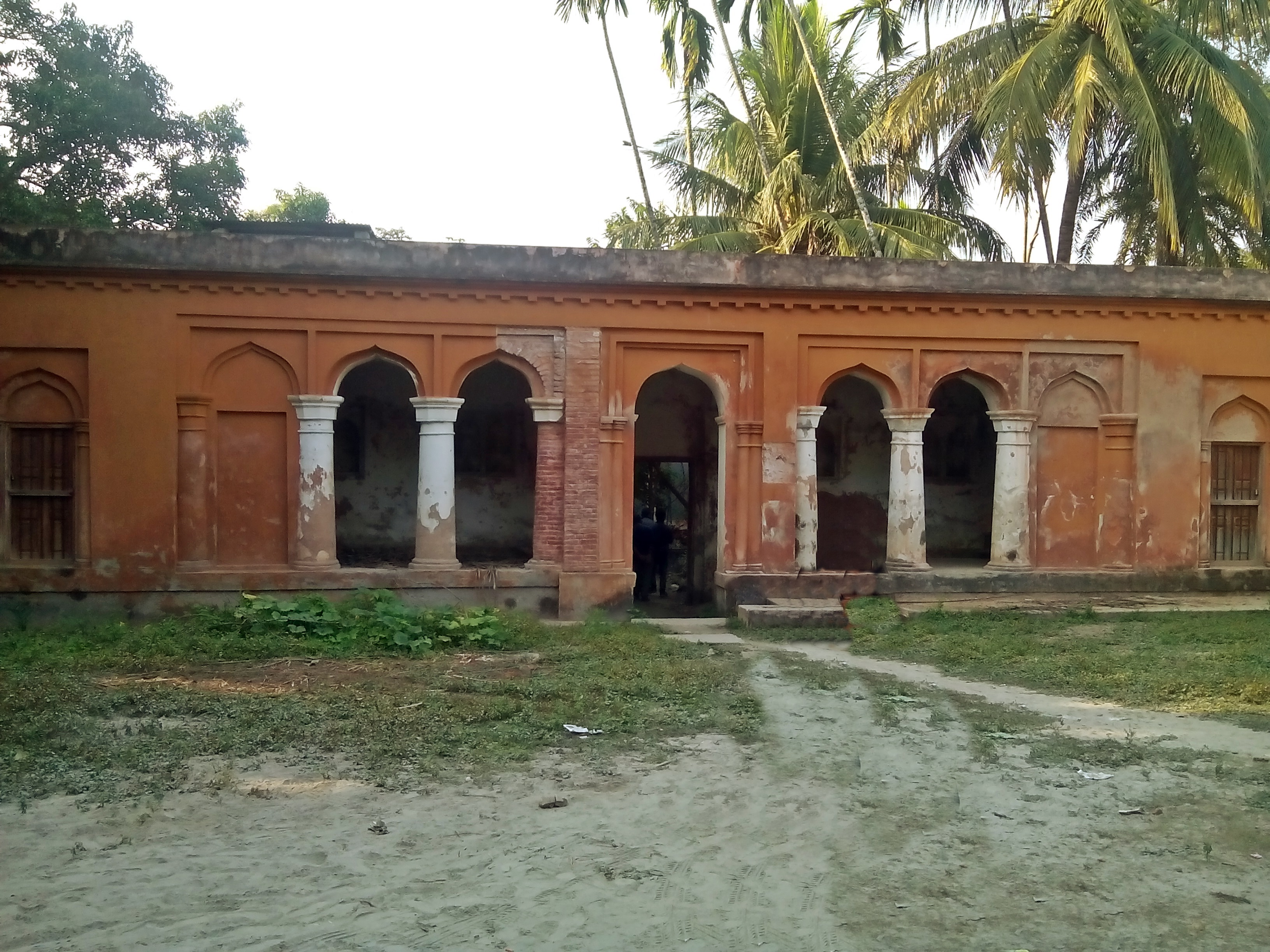
Old residence of the family

The first member of the Tungipara Sheikh family to come to Bengal was Sheikh Abdul Awal Darwish who arrived with a group of Sufi Muslim missionaries from outside of Bengal. Sheikh Abdul Awal was claimed by the family to have come from Baghdad, though this is historically untenable, factors such as the family being Persian speaking, Sheikh Abdul Awal having a son named Zahiruddin, and a grandson named Jan Mahmud, usage of the Persian term Dervish for Abdul Awal, lack of possession of a surname connecting them to the Arab families in Baghdad, and claiming that Abdul Awal was born in Baghdad in a suburb called Hasnabad, while historical records show that no suburb called Hasnabad has ever existed in Baghdad, all indicate an Ajam origin rather than an Arabic speaking one. Some testimonies of descendants of others who claimed to have came as Islamic preachers in Bengal in the same group as Abdul Awal state an Eastern Persian origin rather than a Baghdadi one. It could be said that the Sheikh Family of Tungipara, a few generations after settling in Bengal had disregarded or forgotten their Persian origin and instead started claiming a fictitious Baghdadi origin which was often seen as more fashionable and prestigious, a rather common trend amongst more prominent Muslim families in rural Bengal and also a common invention amongst Indian Muslim hagiographers. Abdul Awal was also stated by the family to have been accompanied by Bayezid Bastami, though this claim has been declared by historians an example of exaggerated hagiography as should this claim have been true, it would mean that the family would have only gone through around eight generations in more than a millennium. Nevertheless, this Sheikh Abdul Awal had travelled to Chittagong to pursue business and to promote Islam in the region of Bengal. Sheikh Abdul Awal had preached in Chittagong for many years, until he went to Sonargaon for business and started preaching there. He married into the Khandakar family of Kandirpar, Faridpur, later his son Sheikh Zahiruddin also married into this family. Many years later, Sheikh Zahiruddin moved to Kolkata with his son Sheikh Jan Mahmud, since their wholesale business was based there. Sheikh Jan Mahmud's son, Sheikh Borhanuddin, continued to run that wholesale business and eventually shifted back to East Bengal.

He married a girl from the Kazi family of Tungipara and permanently settled there. Sheikh Borhanuddin had a son named Sheikh Ekramullah, who in turn had two sons: Sheikh Wasimuddin and Sheikh Mohammad Zakir. Sheikh Mohammad Zakir had three sons: Sheikh Abdul Majid, Sheikh Abdul Hamid, and Sheikh Abdul Rashid. Sheikh Abdul Hamid was the father of Sheikh Lutfar Rahman while his wife, Sayera Khatun, was the daughter of his father's brother, Sheikh Abdul Majid. Their son was Sheikh Mujibur Rahman, who married his third-cousin Sheikh Fazilatunnesa Mujib, great-granddaughter of Sheikh Wasimuddin (his great-grandfather Sheikh Zakir's brother). Sheikh Mujib and Begum Mujib's daughter, Sheikh Hasina, married M. A. Wazed in 1968.

During the era of Sheikh Mujibur Rahman's great-grandfather Sheikh Mohammad Zakir, the family was still a Persian-speaking family.

== Family tree ==
=== Family of Sheikh Mujibur Rahman ===
Sheikh Mujibur Rahman	Sheikh Fazilatunnesa (Note: Begum Mujib and Sheikh Mujib were paternal third-cousins as both their great-grandfathers were brothers.)
Sheikh Hasina	M. A. Wazed	Sheikh Kamal	Sultana Kamal	Sheikh Jamal (Note: Sheikh Jamal's father was the eldest brother of Khadijah Hossain Lily, the mother of his wife Parveen Jamal Rosy. Therefore they were first-cousins.)	Parveen Jamal Rosy	Sheikh Rehana (Note: Sheikh Rehana is sister-in-law to Tarique Ahmed Siddique and niece-in-law to Ivy Rahman and President Zillur Rahman)	Shafiq Ahmed Siddiq	Sheikh Russel
Kristine O. Overmire	Sajeeb Wazed	Saima Wazed	Khandakar Masrur Hossain	Radwan Mujib Siddiq Bobby	Azmina Siddiq	Tulip Siddiq	Christian Percy

=== Family of Sheikh Fatema Begum ===
Sheikh Fatema Begum
Ilias Ahmed Chowdhury (Note: Ilias Ahmed Chowdhury's wife is the daughter of Sheikh Asia Begum, his mother's sister. Therefore they were first-cousins.)	Sheikh Feroza Begum
Liton Chowdhury	Nixon Chowdhury	Muntarin Chowdhury (Note: Muntarin Chowdhury was married to Nixon Chowdhury until her death from falling from her apartment roof in 2014.)
Nazora Chowdhury

=== Family of Sheikh Asia Begum ===
Sheikh Asia Begum
Sheikh Fazlul Haque Mani	Arzu Moni	Sheikh Fazlul Karim Selim	Sheikh Reba Rahman	Naziur Rahman Manzur	Sheikh Feroza Begum (Note: Feroza Begum's husband is the son of Sheikh Fatema Begum, her mother's sister. Therefore they were first-cousins.)	Ilias Ahmed Chowdhury	Sheikh Sultana Rekha	Omor Faruk Chowdhury	Sheikh Fazlur Rahman Maruf	Sanijda Rahman
Sheikh Fazle Noor Taposh	Sheikh Fazle Shams Parash	Sheikh Fazle Fahim	Nancy Zahara Moosa	Andaleeve Rahman Partho (Note: Andaleeve Rahman Partho's maternal grandmother, Sheikh Asia Begum, was the sister of his wife's paternal grandfather Sheikh Abu Naser. Therefore they are second-cousins.)	Liton Chowdhury	Nixon Chowdhury	Muntarin Chowdhury (Note: Muntarin Chowdhury was married to Nixon Chowdhury until her death from falling from her apartment roof in 2014.)	Ishtiaq Ahmed Chowdhury	Muqtadir Ahmed Chowdhury	Abid Chowdhury
Nazora Chowdhury

=== Family of Sheikh Amena Begum and Abdur Rab Serniabat ===
Sheikh Amena Begum	Abdur Rab Serniabat
Baby Serniabat	Abul Hasanat Abdullah	Shahanara Abdullah	Monju Serniabat	Habiba Serniabat	Beauty Serniabat	Rina Serniabat	Abul Khair Abdullah	Arif Serniabat
Sukanto Abdullah Babu	Serniabat Sadiq Abdullah

=== Family of Sheikh Abu Naser and Begum Razia Naser Dolly ===
Sheikh Abu Naser	Begum Razia Naser Dolly
Sheikh Jewel	Sheikh Helal	Rupa Chowdhury	Sheikh Rubel	Sheikh Sohel	Sheikh Tahmina	Ashradul Alam (Tulu)	Sheikh Farhana	Sheikh Belal
Ifrah Tonmoy	Sheikh Tonmoy	Sheikh Shaira Rahman (Note: Sheikh Shaira Rahman's paternal grandfather, Sheikh Abu Naser was the brother of Andaleeve Rahman's grandmother Sheikh Asia Begum. Therefore they are second-cousins.)	Andaleeve Rahman

=== Family of Khadijah Hossain Lily and ATM Syed Hossain ===
Khadijah Hossain Lily	ATM Syed Hossain
Shelly Zaman (Note: ex-ambassador to Spain)	Hamida Wadud Poly	MA Wadud	Habiba Zaman	Shahaduz Zaman	ATM Siddique Hossain	Raju Hossain	Parveen Jamal Rosy (Note: Parveen Jamal Rosy's mother was the youngest sister of Sheikh Mujibur Rahman, the father of her husband Sheikh Jamal. Therefore they were first-cousins.)	Sheikh Jamal
Jawadur Rahim Wadud	Dipu Moni	Hasanuzzaman

== Extended family and in-laws ==
- Qudratullah Sheikh: An early ancestor of the Sheikh family and Zamindar of Faridpur Mahakumar, he was a son of Sheikh Borhanuddin. His nickname was Kadu Sheikh.
  - Sheikh Abdul Jabbar: Son of Qudratullah Sheikh, father of Sheikh Nurul Haque, grandfather of Sheikh Selim and Sheikh Mani.
    - Sheikh Nurul Haque: Father of Sheikh Selim and Sheikh Mani. He was married to Sheikh Asia Begum, granddaughter of his second-cousin Sheikh Abdul Hamid and sister of Sheikh Mujib. His grandsons are Liton Chowdhury, Nixon Chowdhury, Andaleeve Rahman, Sheikh Taposh, Sheikh Fahim.
- Sheikh Akram Hossain: A freedom fighter and son of Sheikh Mahfuzul Haque. Akram was Begum Mujib’s first cousin on her father’s side. He was also Bangabandhu Sheikh Mujib’s cousin and uncle of Sheikh Hasina. He was the Acting President of Tungipara Upazila Awami League. In 1967 after the six point movement Sheikh Akram Hossain first went to Jail to meet Bangabandhu Sheikh Mujibur Rahman. He also filed Hebeas Corpus petition in court at that time. During Ershad period Sheikh Hasina and Sheikh Akram Hossain were both placed under house arrest at Dhanmondi 32. He was popular and highly respected among grassroots Awami League supporters and was affectionately knows as the “National Uncle or Jatiya Mama ( জাতীয় মামা ) “
- Sheikh Ahmed Hossain Mirza:- A freedom fighter and son of Sheikh Mahfuzul Haque first cousin of Begum Fazilatunnesa Mujib and Uncle of Sheikh Hasina. Sheikh Mirza was the Mayor of Tungipara Municipality in 2015-2021 also the acting president of tungipara upazila Awami league. He is the younger brother of Sheikh Akram Hossain
- Sheikh Abdul Rashid: Son of Sheikh Mohammad Zakir, brother of both Sheikh Abdul Majid and Sheikh Abdul Hamid, paternal uncle of both Sheikh Lutfar Rahman and Sheikh Sayera Khatun, and paternal granduncle of both Sheikh Mujib and Begum Mujib. He was given the title of Khan Sahib by the then ruling British.
  - Sheikh Mosharraf Hossain (d. 1991): Son of Sheikh Abdul Rashid, a first-cousin of Sheikh Lutfar Rahman, and an uncle of Sheikh Mujibur Rahman. He was given the title of Khan Sahib by the British Raj. He was a member of the legislative assembly of Pakistan in 1965 and 1970. During the Bangladesh Liberation War, he was accused of collaborating with the Pakistan Army. After independence he was arrested on charges of collaboration but later freed due to his nephew Sheikh Mujib's intervention. He died on 12 July 1991.
    - Sheikh Kabir Hossain: Son of Sheikh Mosharraf Hossain and second-cousin of Sheikh Mujibur Rahman. He founded the Fareast International University in Dhaka. His only daughter, Rumpa Kabir, is married to Anindya Bhuiyan, son of Abdul Mannan Bhuiyan (former BNP secretary-general).
    - Sheikh Nadir Hossain: Son of Sheikh Mosharraf Hossain and chairman of Milkvita Bangladesh.
- Sheikh Zinnatunnesa Begum: Daughter of Sheikh Zahurul Haque and Sheikh Husne Ara Begum. Her sister was Sheikh Fazilatunnesa Mujib and her third cousin was Sheikh Mujibur Rahman, making Sheikh Hasina her niece. She was married to her cousin Sheikh Mohammad Musa and had a son, Sheikh Shahidul Islam.
  - Sheikh Shahidul Islam: Son of Sheikh Mohammad Musa and Sheikh Zinnatunessa Begum, nephew of both Sheikh Mujib & Begum Mujib, and first-cousin of Sheikh Hasina. He served as the Minister for Education, Public Works, Youth and Sports from 1984 to 1990 and is a former member of parliament from Madaripur-3.
- Sheikh Hafizur Rahman: Son of Sheikh Habibur Rahman, youngest brother of Sheikh Lutfar Rahman. He was a first-cousin of Sheikh Mujibur Rahman and uncle of Sheikh Hasina. He served as a member of parliament from Narail-2 and is a member of the Workers Party of Bangladesh. His wife, Sheikh Anne Rahman, was a member of parliament from a women's reserved seat. Her father was politician Enayet Hossain Khan.
  - Pritom Hasan: Bangladeshi singer and actor. Sheikh Anne Rahman is his paternal aunt.
- Khandaker Nurul Islam: Also known as Nuru Mia. He was elected to the Pakistan parliament in the 1970 Pakistani general election. He was accused of being a collaborator of the Pakistan Army during the Bangladesh Liberation War. Later he was elected to the first Jatiya Sangsad in the 1973 Bangladeshi general election. One of the early ancestors of the Sheikh family, Sheikh Zahiruddin, married a woman from the Khandakar family of Kandirpar, Faridpur. He was a distant cousin of Sheikh Mujibur Rahman and grandfather-in-law of Saima Wazed. His brother, Hiru Mia, was married to the sister of Syeda Iqbal Mand Banu, mother-in-law of Tarique Rahman (son of Ziaur Rahman and Khaleda Zia).
  - Khandaker Mosharraf Hossain: Son of Nuru Mia, former minister and member of parliament from Faridpur. His son, Khandakar Masrur Hossain, was married to Saima Wazed, daughter of Sheikh Hasina.
    - Khandakar Masrur Hossain: Son of Khandaker Mosharraf Hossain. He married his cousin Saima Wazed, making Sheikh Hasina his mother-in-law and Sheikh Mujib his grandfather-in-law.
    - Muhammad Habibe Millat: Son-in-law of Khandaker Mosharraf Hossain and former member of parliament from Sirajganj-2.
- Kazi Zafarullah: Senior Awami League politician and former member of parliament from Faridpur-4. One of the early ancestors of the Sheikh family, Sheikh Borhanuddin, married a woman from the Kazi family of Tungipara, making them cousins of the Sheikhs. His father, Kazi Mahbubullah, was a cousin and close friend of Sheikh Mujib, while Zafarullah himself was a cousin and close friend of Sheikh Kamal. He is married to Nilufer Zafarullah, chairman of Midland Bank Limited and former member of parliament from Faridpur-4.
- Shahid Serniabat: Nephew of Abdur Rab Serniabat. He was killed along with his uncle and cousins in 1975.
- General Mustafizur Rahman: Married a cousin of Sheikh Mujibur Rahman. He served as the Chief of Army Staff from December 1997 to December 2000. General Rahman was one of the people involved in the Mig-29 corruption scandal, which also included his niece Sheikh Hasina.
  - General Waker-uz-Zaman: Son-in-law of General Mustafizur Rahman and he is the 18th Chief of Army Staff. His wife, Sarahnaz Rahman, is a second cousin of Sheikh Hasina. General Waker is noted to be the general who oversaw the resignation of his sister-in-law Sheikh Hasina on 5 August 2024.
- Jahangir Kabir Nanak: Former president of Jubo League, former secretary-general of Chhatra League, and senior Awami League politician. He is a nephew of Abdur Rab Serniabat (brother-in-law of Sheikh Mujib) and cousin of Abul Hasanat Abdullah.
- Amir Hossain Amu: Senior Awami League politician and member of parliament from Jhalokati-2. He was married to Feroza Hossain (d. 2007), a cousin of Sheikh Mujib, making him an uncle to Sheikh Hasina and brother-in-law to Sheikh Mujib.
- Mominul Haque Khoka: First cousin of Sheikh Mujibur Rahman (his mother was the sister of Sheikh Lutfar Rahman) and a freedom fighter. Khoka died in 2014 at the age of 81 in Singapore, leaving behind a son and a daughter.
  - Farhana Haque: Daughter of Mominul Haque Khoka and a Bangladeshi businesswoman. She is a director of Bank Asia Limited and owner of DHS Motors (distributor of Honda vehicles in Bangladesh). She is married to businessman Romo Rouf Chowdhury (son of A. Rouf Chowdhury, the founder of Rangs Group).
- Zillur Rahman and Ivy Rahman: Zillur Rahman was a senior Awami League politician who served as the President of Bangladesh from 2009 until his death in 2013. His wife, Ivy, was the maternal aunt of Shafique Ahmed Siddique (husband of Sheikh Rehana) and Tarique Ahmed Siddique (former security and defence advisor to Sheikh Hasina). She was the president of the Bangladesh Mohila Awami League. Her son is Nazmul Hassan Papon. She died in the 2004 Dhaka grenade attack.
  - Nazmul Hassan Papon: First cousin of Shafique Ahmed Siddique and brother-in-law of Sheikh Rehana. He is a former member of parliament from Kishoreganj-6 and president of the Bangladesh Cricket Board. He is married to the daughter of businessman, Hashem Ali, from the Ali family of Chittagong (owners of Hotel Agrabad).
  - Tarique Ahmed Siddique: Brother of Shafique Ahmed Siddique and the brother-in-law of Sheikh Rehana. He is a nephew of Ivy Rahman and an uncle of Tulip Siddiq. He is a retired major general of the Bangladesh Army. He was the defense and security advisor to Prime Minister Sheikh Hasina.
- AFM Bahauddin Nasim: Served as a member of parliament and APS to Sheikh Hasina. His paternal grandmother was a sister of Sheikh Lutfar Rahman, making Sheikh Mujib his uncle and Sheikh Hasina his second-cousin.
- Abul Kalam Azad: Former information and cultural affairs minister of Bangladesh. His wife is the sister of Sheikh Selim's wife.
- Moosa Bin Shamsher: Bangladeshi businessman and alleged arms dealer. His daughter, Nancy, is married to Sheikh Fazle Fahim, son of Sheikh Selim.
  - Bobby Hajjaj: Bangladeshi politician, academic, writer, and professor at North South University. He is the founder and leader of the National Democratic Movement and currently a member of the Bangladesh Nationalist Party. He is the brother-in-law of Sheikh Fazle Fahim, through his sister, Nancy.
- Iqbal Hassan Mahmood: Minister and BNP leader. His daughter, Sarah, is married to Sheikh Nayem, son of Sheikh Selim. His close friend was Sheikh Kamal.
- Mahbubul Alam Hanif: Senior Awami League leader and former Special Assistant to Sheikh Hasina. His older brother was married to the sister of Abul Hasanat Abdullah (first-cousin of Sheikh Hasina).
- Lal Mia and Mohan Mia: Zamindars of Faridpur and sons of Chowdhury Moyezuddin Biwshash. Lal Mia's eldest son, Raja Mia, was married to the daughter of Mosammat Begum (Sheikh Mujib's cousin). Their son, Golam Gafur Chowdhury, was an established lawyer from Faridpur. Mohan Mia's son was married to the sister of Khandaker Mosharraf Hossain.
- Anwar Hossain Manju: Bangladeshi politician and president of the Jatiya Party (Manju), a close family friend and in-law of the Sheikh family. He served as a minister several times in Sheikh Hasina's different cabinets. His father was Tofazzal Hossain Manik Miah, a journalist and owner of The Daily Ittefaq. Manik Miah was a close associate and mentor to Sheikh Mujibur Rahman, making the two families close friends. Sheikh Mujib named the street in front of the Jatiya Sangsad as Manik Miah Avenue in his honor after independence. Manju's daughter, Tareen Hossain Manju, is married to Nixon Chowdhury, grandnephew of Sheikh Mujibur Rahman.
  - Tasmima Hossain: Jatiya Party politician and former MP. Wife of Anwar Hossain Manju and mother-in-law of Nixon Chowdhury.
  - Mainul Hosein: Former MP and Law, Information and Land Advisor to former Chief Adviser Fakhruddin Ahmed. Uncle-in-law of Nixon Chowdhury.
  - Tofazzal Hossain Manik Miah: close associate and mentor to Sheikh Mujib. Grandfather-in-law of Nixon Chowdhury.
  - Khandaker Mahbub Hossain:former vice-chairman of the Bangladesh Nationalist Party. Granduncle-in-law of Nixon Chowdhury.
- Mahbub Ara Begum Gini: Awami League politician and former MP. Grand-niece of M A Wazed Miah, niece of Sajeeb and Saima Wazed.

== Photo gallery ==
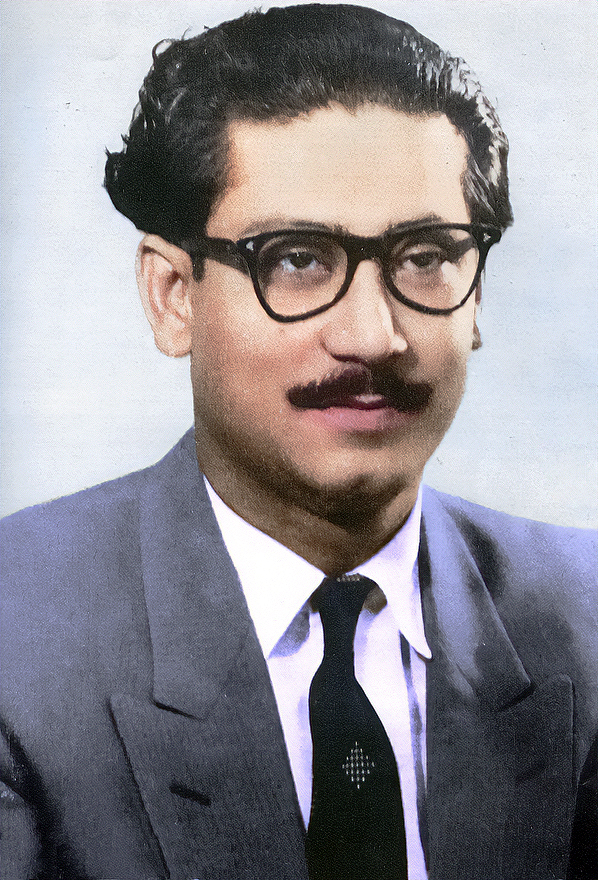
Sheikh Mujibur Rahman

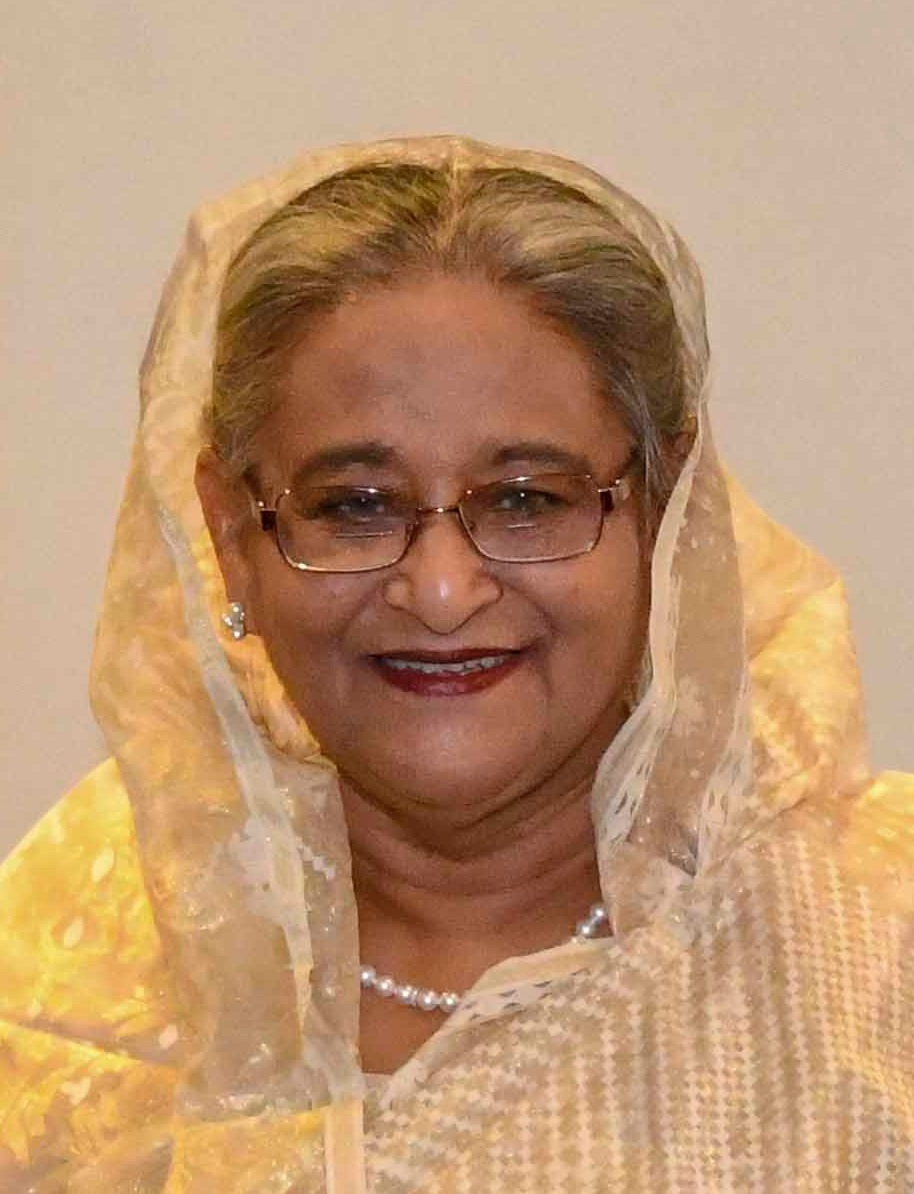
Sheikh Hasina

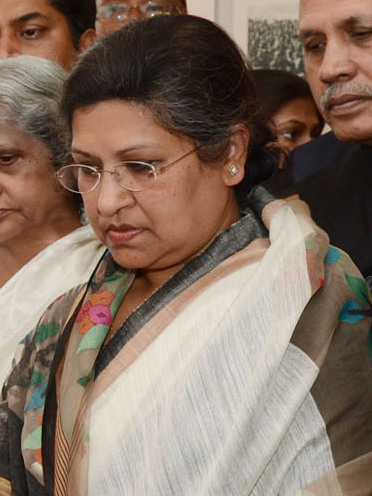
Sheikh Rehana

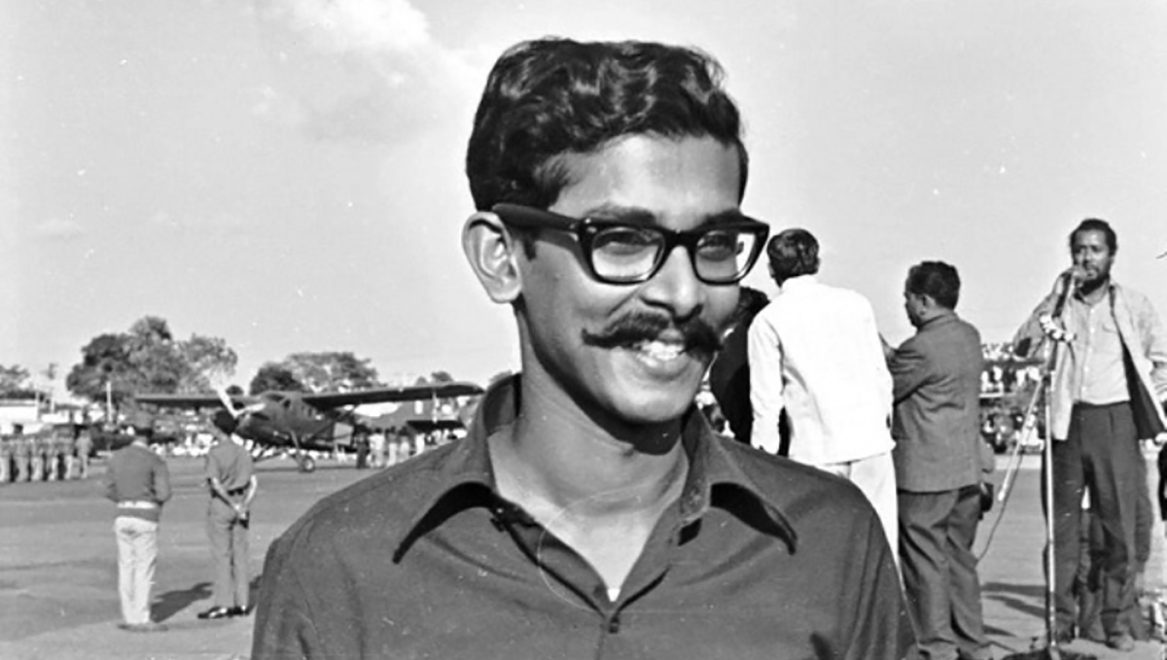
Sheikh Kamal

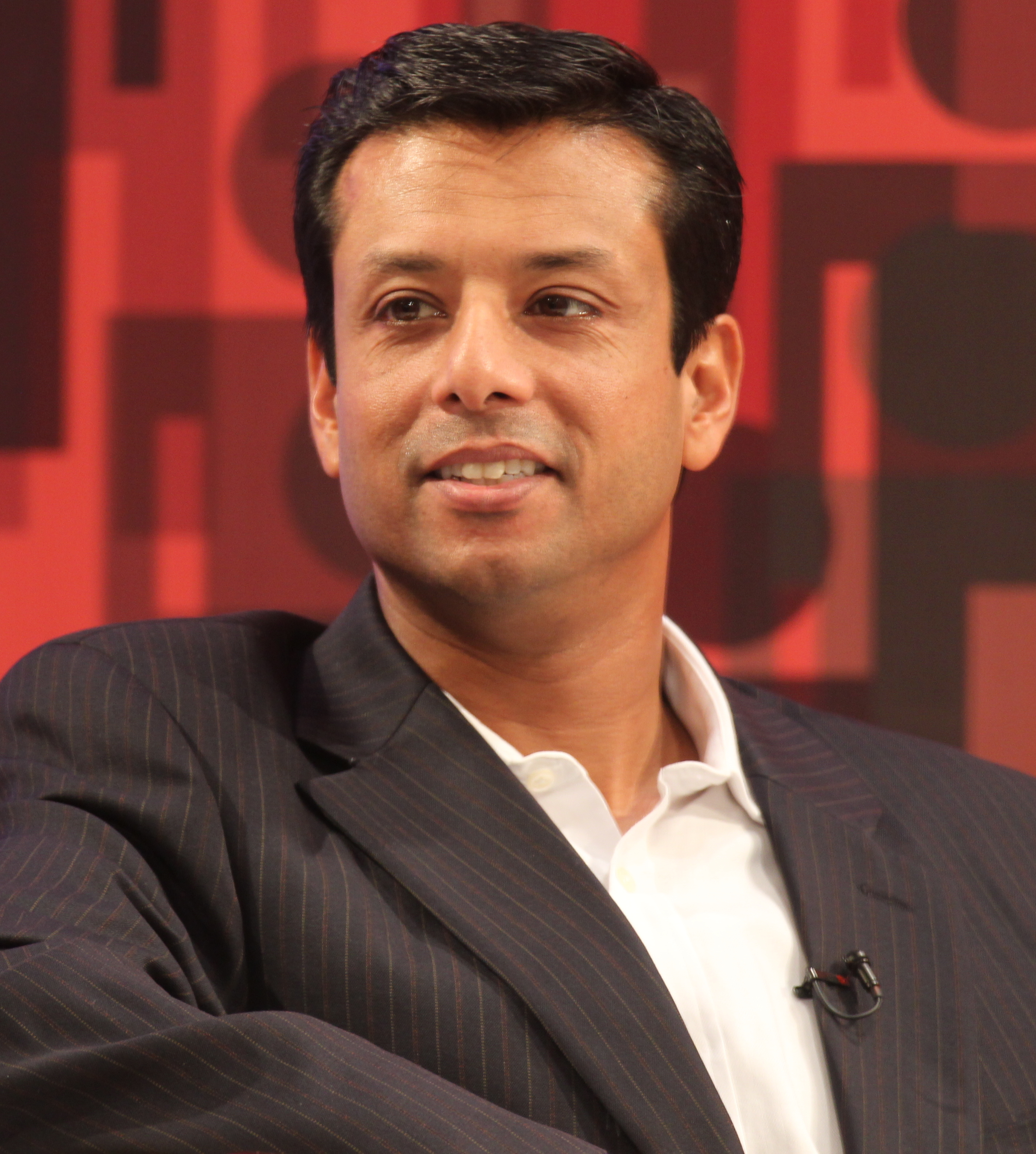
Sajeeb Wazed

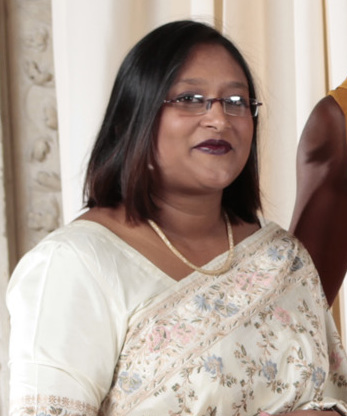
Saima Wazed

Tulip Siddiq

== See also ==
- Majumder-Zia family
- Political families of the world
- Sheikh (Bangladeshi Surname)
