= Ivy Rahman =

Bangladeshi politician

- আইভি রহমান
- Born: Jebun Nahar Ivy; 7 July 1934; Bhairab Upazila, Kishoreganj District, Bengal Presidency, British India
- Died: 24 August 2004 (aged 70); Dhaka, Bangladesh
- Cause of death: Succumbing from injuries of grenade attack
- Resting place: Banani Graveyard
- Education: University of Dhaka
- Political party: Bangladesh Awami League
- Spouse: Zillur Rahman (m. 1958; died 2013)
- Children: Nazmul Hasan Papon
- Relatives: Shafique Ahmed Siddique (nephew); Tarique Ahmed Siddique (nephew) Sheikh Rehana (niece-in-law); Tulip Siddiq (grandniece) Radwan Mujib Siddiq Bobby (grandnephew)
- Awards: Independence Award

Ivy Rahman (Bengali: আইভি রহমান; née Jebun Nahar Ivy; 7 July 1934 – 24 August 2004) was a Bangladeshi politician. She was the women's affairs secretary of the Awami League. She was injured and later died following the 2004 Dhaka grenade attack.

== Career ==
Rahman was the founding organizing secretary of the Awami League's women's wing, Mohila Awami League, established by Sheikh Mujibur Rahman in 1969. She was elected women's affairs secretary of the Awami League Central Working Committee in 1978, and two years later she became the president of Mohila Awami League. She had served in those positions until 2002.

From 1996 to 2001, Rahman served as the chair of Jatiya Mohila Sangstha and Bangladesh Jatiya Mohila Samabaya Samity. She was the president of Mohila Samity and general secretary of Bangladesh Andhakalyan Samity until her death.

== Personal life ==
Ivy Rahman was born in Bhairab Upazila, Kishoreganj District. She was the fifth among the eleven children of the principal of Dhaka College, Jalal Uddin Ahmed, and Hasina Begum. Her elder sister, Shamsur Nahar Siddique (1929-2017), was the mother-in-law of Bangladesh Awami League politician Sheikh Rehana. She married fellow Awami League politician Zillur Rahman on 27 June 1958, when she was 24 years old and he was 29 years old. Zillur Rahman became the president of Bangladesh in 2009. They had two daughters – Tania and Monia – and one son – Nazmul Hasan Papon. Papon was an Awami League member of parliament and president of the Bangladesh Cricket Board.

== Death and legacy ==
On 21 August 2004, Rahman was present at an Awami League political rally in Dhaka. After a speech by the president of Awami League and then leader of the opposition, Sheikh Hasina, ended, some extremists, allegedly involved with Harkat-ul-Jihad al-Islami, launched a coordinated grenade attack on the Awami League leaders. Ivy Rahman was injured in the grenade blast, and both of her legs were blown off. After three days, she died on 24 August 2004, in the Combined Military Hospital in Dhaka. She was buried in Banani Graveyard. She was given a posthumous Independence Award in 2009.

Bangladesh's first swimming sports organizing and training swimming pool was posthumously named after her.
