= Mujib Amar Pita =

- First Poster
- Directed by: Sohel Mohammad Rana
- Written by: Fahad Ibn Kabir and Chisty Kanon
- Screenplay by: Fahad Ibn Kabir and Chisty Kanon
- Story by: Sheikh Hasina
- Based on: শেখ মুজিব আমার পিতা by Prime Ministar Sheikh Hasina
- Starring: Raju Ahmed; Mohammad Rafique; Mehbuba Mehnaz Bipa
- Music by: Omar Faruk Nayon
- Production companies: Prolancer Studio & BMIT Solutions
- Distributed by: ICT Division.
- Release date: October 1, 2021
- Running time: 49 minutes
- Country: Bangladesh
- Language: Bengali

Mujib Amar Pita (Bengali: মুজিব আমার পিতা) is a 2021 Bangladeshi animated biography drama film. It was the first full-length Bangladeshi animated film. The film was directed by Sohel Mohammad Rana. It was Produced by Prolancer Studio & BMIT Solutions and was distributed by ICT Division. The film is based on Sheikh Mujib Amar Pita (Bengali:শেখ মুজিব আমার পিতা ) a book written by Sheikh Hasina, the daughter of Sheikh Mujibur Rahman and the Prime Minister of Bangladesh. The film was released on October 1, 2021.

== Voice cast ==
- Raju Ahmed as Young Sheikh Mujibur Rahman
- Mohammad Rafique as Teen Sheikh Mujibur Rahman
- Mehbuba Mehnaz Bipa as Sheikh Hasina
- Tahsina Ferdous Rinia as Sheikh Fazilatunnesa Mujib
- Abul Kalam Azad Setu as Sheikh Lutfar Rahman
- Merina Mitu as Sayera Khatun
- Mithun as Hamid Master
- Hindol Roy as Hussain Shaheed Suhrawardy
- Arup Kundu as Abdul Hamid Chowdhury
- Kazi Rakib

== Production ==
=== Development ===
The making of Mujib Amar Pita was started in 2020 and ended in January–February 2021.

=== Animation ===
The film's animation was done in traditional 2D animation.

== Release ==
The film had a premiere on September 28, 2021 and later got a cinema hall release on October 1, 2021. The film had a world premiere in US.

== Reception ==
=== Critical response ===
On the Review of News Article Info , they said "It could have been better but because its the first Bangladeshi animated film it feel something new"
