= Amar Fashi Chai =

1999 books by Motiur Rahman Rentu

Amar Fashi Chai আমার ফাঁসি চাই
- Amar Fashi Chai book cover in Bengali
- Author: Motiur Rahman Rentu
- Language: Bengali
- Genre: Biography
- Published: 26 March 1999
- Publisher: Shornolota O Bonolota
- Publication place: Bangladesh
- Pages: 235
- ISBN: 978-984-96426-8-8

Amar Fashi Chai (Bengali: আমার ফাঁসি চাই; lit. 'I want to be hanged'), is a book written by Motiur Rahman Rentu published in 1999. The book, set in the political and social context of Bangladesh, was banned by the then Prime Minister of Bangladesh, Sheikh Hasina. The book describes various aspects of Hasina's character.

== Background ==
From 1981 to 1997, Matiur Rahman, who served as Sheikh Hasina's personal advisor for almost 12 years from 1981 to 1997, was declared undesirable by Hasina and her family after she complained of irregularities of the party leader and Hasina's family members. After the unwanted announcement, Rentu decided to write the book on the negative aspects of Hasina.

== Contents ==
The book claims that Assassination of Ziaur Rahman was planned by the Awami League. The party is said to have spent Tk 1.37 crore to make Mohammad Hanif the mayor of Dhaka City Corporation. The book claims that Nageshwari river ferryman Sareng was paid Rs 50,000 to kill Khaleda Zia. The book claims that Sheikh Hasina would become happy after hearing the news of the corpses. She would sing her favorite song "Zindagi Zindagi" and dance in rejoicement. The book indicates that Bangabandhu Sheikh Mujibur Rahman first sided with Pakistan and then with India. The book mentions Sheikh Hasina's closeness to the pro-Pakistan party Bangladesh Jamaat-e-Islami and her involvement in the communal violence in Bangladesh in 1992.

== Reception and response ==
Part of the book was regularly published in Bangladesh Nationalist Party-owned The Daily Dinkal but was later discontinued. Later, on a 26 June 2000 report, the newspaper reported that "readers requested the newspaper authority to continue the publication of the book by telephone." On 29 June 2000, Hasina's government banned the book on the grounds that it might incite public hatred against the government. According to columnist Abdul Hannan, the book's claim about Ziaur Rahman's assassination was controversial because it was not taken from someone else but directly by the author. After reading the book Khaleda Zia about Sheikh Hasina's desire to kill him, she thought that Hasina might be behind multiple assassination attempts to kill Khaleda. On the other hand, Sheikh Hasina felt the need to investigate whether Khaleda Zia had a conspiracy behind the publication of the book. after publication, the government banned the book shortly after. The book was banned on the grounds that author Matiur Rahman Rentu had spread historical distortions and political debates through the book.

== Controversy ==
On 22 June 2000, the author of the book was shot by assailants in a shop near his home. He alleged that he was attacked for writing the book.

In 2002, Shafique Ahmed Siddique filed a defamation case against Matiur Rahman Rentu over the book "Amar Fashi Chai". After a long five-year hearing, a court in Dhaka on 19 April 2007, awarded Rentu a compensation of Tk 1,00,31,998. But failing to get compensation, Siddique filed a case on 10 August 2007, to confiscate Rentu's property.
