= Sheikh Kabir Hossain =

Bangladeshi businessman (1942–2026)

- শেখ কবির হোসেন
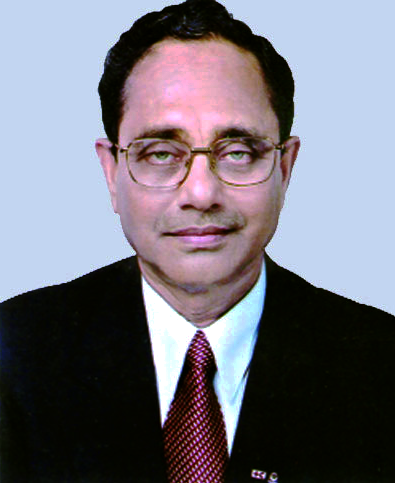
- Born: 3 February 1942; Gopalganj, Faridpur District, Bengal Province, British India
- Died: 14 February 2026 (aged 84); Dhaka, Bangladesh
- Spouse: Masuda Kabir
- Parents: Sheikh Mosharraf Hossain (father); Rahela Khatun (mother)

Sheikh Kabir Hossain (Bengali: শেখ কবির হোসেন; 3 February 1942 – 14 February 2026) was a Bangladeshi businessman and a member of the Sheikh family of Tungipara. He was the President of Bangladesh Insurance Association. He served as President of Association of Private Universities of Bangladesh.

== Early life ==
Hossain was born on 3 February 1942, to the Bengali Sheikh family of Tungipara in Gopalganj, Faridpur district, Bengal Province. His father was Sheikh Mosharraf Hossain (first cousin of Sheikh Lutfar Rahman) and his mother was Rahela Khatun. He completed his master's from the University of Dhaka. His second cousin was Sheikh Mujibur Rahman.

== Career ==
Hossain worked at the Bangladesh Parjatan Corporation, Bureau of Statistics, and Sonali Bank. He resigned from this government job after assassination of Sheikh Mujibur Rahman in 1975.

He was the chairperson of Sonar Bangla Insurance Limited, Khan Shaheb Sheikh Mosharraf Hossain Foundation, Central Depository Bangladesh Limited. Hossain was the founding chairperson of Holy Family Red Crescent Medical College Hospital. He was also the founding chairperson of Khan Shaheb Sheikh Mosharraf Hossain School and College in Tungipara, Gopalganj. Hossain was the chairperson of National Tea Company Limited. In July 2005, he was elected director of The International Association of Lions Clubs in Hong Kong for a two-year term.

On 16 September 2008, Hossain chaired a meeting of Tungipara Association which demanded that the caretaker government release former Prime Minister of Bangladesh Sheikh Hasina from prison.

On 15 December 2010, Hossain was elected chairman of Bangladesh Insurance Association. He was a director of Channel 24 and launched its test transmission in August 2011.

Hossain was the President of the Bangladesh Insurance Association, a trade association of insurance companies in Bangladesh. He asked the Bangladesh Nationalist Party to not hold strikes due to their detrimental effect on the economy. He was the chairperson of Fareast International University and non-profit H.E.L.P. (Health and Education for the Local underprivileged People). He was the Managing Director of Kabico Limited. Hossain was also the Managing Director of Masuda Dairy Nutrition Limited. In 2013, he was part of a panel formed by Dhaka Stock Exchange to investigate problems at the stock market.

He was the Chairperson of the Association of Private Universities of Bangladesh, a trade association of private universities in Bangladesh. He was reelected President of the Association in 2017. He was also the chairperson of the Bangladesh Red Crescent Society. Hossain was the director of the Dhaka Stock Exchange. He was a Trustee Board member of the Bangabandhu Academy for Poverty Alleviation and Rural Development.

Hossain was re-elected chairperson of National Tea Company Limited.

In April 2021, Hossain was re-elected President of the Bangladesh Insurance Association. He served as president of association from 2011.

He described the imposition of 15 percent income tax on private universities by the Government of Bangladesh as "unacceptable" in July 2021. He also sought the intervention of Prime Minister Sheikh Hasina to repeal the law. He was a member of the Board of Governors of Bangladesh Open University.

== Personal life and death ==
Hossain was married to Masuda Kabir and together they had three children. His daughter is married to the son of Bangladesh Nationalist Party's former secretary-general Abdul Mannan Bhuiyan.

Hossain died in Dhaka on 14 February 2026, at the age of 84.
