= Sheikh Mosharraf Hossain =

Bengali politician

Sheikh Mosharraf Hossain (Bengali: শেখ মোশাররফ হোসেন) was a Bengali politician and a cousin of Sheikh Lutfar Rahman, the father of Sheikh Mujibur Rahman and grandfather of Prime Minister Sheikh Hasina. He served as a member of the East Pakistan Legislative Assembly. His father was Khan Sahib Sheikh Abdul Rashid, brother of Sheikh Abdul Hamid and Sheikh Abdul Majid, both of whom were grandfathers of Sheikh Mujibur Rahman. Sheikh Mosharraf Hossain had two brothers, including Sheikh Delwar Hossain Dilu, a freedom fighter, and another brother who was a businessman.

== Career ==
Hossain was given the title of Khan Bahadur by the British government.

Hossain was a member of the East Pakistan Legislative Assembly in 1962. Khan Sahib Sheikh Musharraf Hossain School and College was established in Tungipara, Gopalganj District in his name. His son, Sheikh Kabir Hossain, was the founding chairperson of the Khan Sahib Sheikh Musharraf Hossain School and College.

== Personal life ==
Hossain’s nephew, Sheikh Mujibur Rahman, was the founding father of Bangladesh, the leader of the Liberation War of 1971, and the country’s first President and Prime Minister. Hossain was married to Rahela Khatun. He had seven sons and five daughters, two of whom were Sheikh Kabir Hossain and Sheikh Nadir Hossain. Sheikh Kabir Hossain was the founder of Fareast International University in Dhaka.

Hossain had five other sons and five daughters.
