= Central Depository Bangladesh Limited =

Bangladesh government regulatory agency

- Formation: 2000
- Headquarters: Dhaka, Bangladesh
- Official language: Bengali
- Chairman of the Board: Tapan Chowdhury
- Website: www.cdbl.com.bd

Central Depository Bangladesh Limited (Bengali: সেন্ট্রাল ডিপোজিটরি বাংলাদেশ লিমিটেড) is a Bangladesh government regulatory agency that records and facilitates the trade of securities in Bangladesh. It is the National Numbering Agency for International Securities Identification Number in Bangladesh and member of the Association of National Numbering Agencies. Tapan Chowdhury is chairman of the board of directors. It is the only securities depository enterprise in Bangladesh .

== History ==
Central Depository Bangladesh Limited was established on 20 August 2000. AKM Shamsuddin was the founding chairman of Central Depository Bangladesh Limited.

On 20 October 2003, Electronic Government Securities Registry went online, allowing the Central Depository Bangladesh Limited to function. Bangladesh Securities and Exchange Commission approved the bylaws necessary for Central Depository Bangladesh Limited to begin operations. M Habibus Samad was then managing director of Central Depository Bangladesh Limited. The transformed share transaction from paper to a digital one.

Central Depository Bangladesh Limited is an associate member of the South Asian Federation of Exchanges.

The president of Chittagong Stock Exchange, Fakhor Uddin Ali Ahmed, asked Central Depository Bangladesh Limited to reduce their fees to increase the confidence of stock market investors in September 2011.

Bangladesh Bank ordered the Central Depository Bangladesh Limited to examine accounts held by depository participants in November 2014. To participate in the stock market and apply for primary stocks one needs a beneficiary owner through a depository participant.

Bangladesh Securities and Exchange Commission ordered the Central Depository Bangladesh Limited to reduce the fees charged by them in 2016. National Board of Revenue ordered Central Depository Bangladesh Limited to investigate Debapriya Bhattacharya and his wife, Irina Bhattacharya, all their assets in the stock market. A. K. M. Nurul Fazal Bulbul, co-founder of Sunlife Insurance Company Limited and EXIM Bank Limited, was elected chairman of Central Depository Bangladesh Limited in 2016.

On 4 February 2018, Shuvra Kanti Choudhury was appointed managing director of Central Depository Bangladesh. The company announced plans to begin web operations with software bought from Tata Consultancy Services. Samson H Chowdhury was a former chairman of Central Depository Bangladesh Limited.

Bangladesh Financial Intelligence Unit ordered Central Depository Bangladesh Limited to investigate the directors of Peoples Leasing and Financial Services.

In 2021, Bangladesh Securities and Exchange Commission ordered Central Depository Bangladesh Limited to halt trading of all shares of Fareast Islami Life Insurance Company Limited whose directors were suspected of embezzling money from policy holders.

In February 2022, investors blamed Central Depository Bangladesh Limited and Dhaka Stock Exchange for securities fraud committed by Tamha Securities. Tamha Securities, Banco Securities, and Crest Securities were three companies that stopped operations due to fraud. The ICT Division identified Central Depository Bangladesh Limited as a critical information infrastructure under the Digital Security Act and protected by the Digital Security Agency and National Data Center.

== Board of directors ==
Sl.	Name	Remark	Reference
1.	Sheikh Kabir Hossain	Chairman of Fareast International University	
2.	A. K. M. Nurul Fazal Bulbul	Chairman of Sunlife Insurance Co. Limited	
3.	Syed Manzur Elahi	Chairman of Apex group	
4.	Azam Jahangir Chowdhury	Chairman of East Coast Group and Prime Bank Limited	
5.	Tapan Chowdhury	Managing Director of Square Pharmaceuticals Limited	
6.	Md. Afzal Karim	Managing Director of Sonali Bank Limited	
7.	Tarique Afzal	Managing Director of AB Bank	
8.	Syed Shahriyar Ahsan	Managing Director of Sadharan Bima Corporation	
9.	Salman F. Rahman	Vice chairman of Beximco Group	
10.	Md. Abul Hossain	Managing Director of Investment Corporation of Bangladesh	
11.	Md. Eunusur Rahman	Chairman of Dhaka Stock Exchange	
12.	Asif Ibrahim	Chairman of Chittagong Stock Exchange	
13.	A. K. M. Shamsuddin	Chairman of News Crop Publication Limited	
14.	Md. Abdul Mutaleb	Managing Director & CEO (Acting) of Central Depository Bangladesh Limited	

== See also ==
- Asia-Pacific Central Securities Depository Group
