= Nazmul Hassan =

Bangladeshi cricket administrator

Nazmul Hassan Papon
- নাজমুল হাসান পাপন
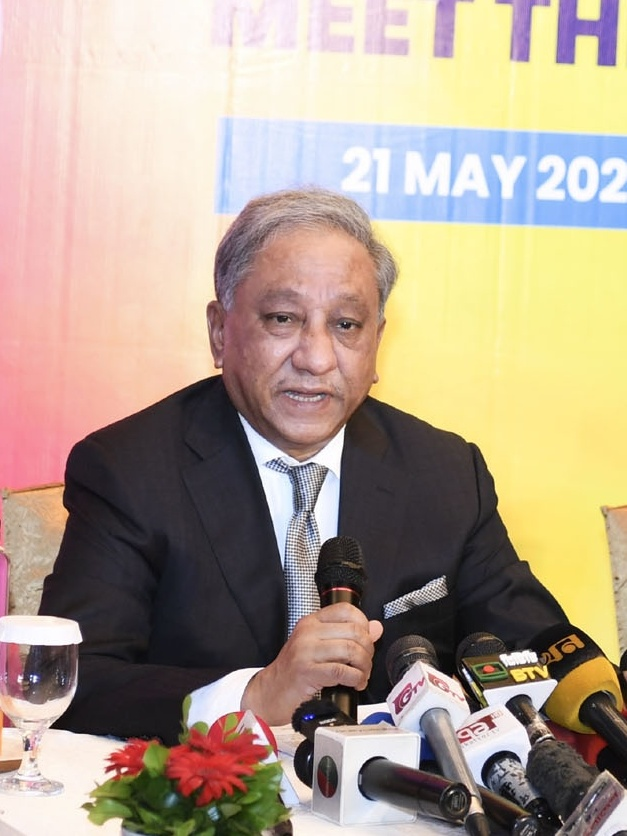
- Nazmul Hassan in 2024

Minister of Youth and Sports
- In office 11 January 2024 – 5 August 2024
- Prime Minister: Sheikh Hasina
- Preceded by: Zahid Ahsan Russel (as State Minister)
- Succeeded by: Asif Mahmud (as Adviser)

President of the Bangladesh Cricket Board
- In office 17 October 2012 – 21 August 2024
- Vice President: Mahbub Anam; A J M Nasir Uddin
- Preceded by: Mustafa Kamal
- Succeeded by: Faruk Ahmed

Member of the Bangladesh Parliament for Kishoreganj-6
- In office 7 February 2009 – 6 August 2024
- Preceded by: Zillur Rahman
- Succeeded by: Md. Shariful Alam

President of Asian Cricket Council
- In office 17 November 2018 – 30 January 2021
- Preceded by: Ehsan Mani
- Succeeded by: Jay Shah

Personal details
- Born: 31 May 1961 (age 65) Bhairab, East Pakistan, Pakistan
- Party: Bangladesh Awami League
- Parents: Zillur Rahman (father); Ivy Rahman (mother)
- Relatives: Shafique Ahmed Siddique (cousin); Tarique Ahmed Siddique (cousin)
- Education: University of Dhaka
- Profession: Politician, administrator

Nazmul Hassan Papon (born 31 May 1961) is a Bangladeshi politician and a cricket administrator. He is a former minister of youth and sports and a former Jatiya Sangsad member representing the Kishoreganj-6 constituency. He is also the former president of the Bangladesh Cricket Board.

== Personal life ==
Nazmul Hassan Papon was born at the north Bhairab River in the Bhairabpur area, Kishoreganj, Bangladesh. His father, Zillur Rahman, was the president of Bangladesh, and his mother is Ivy Rahman, a Bangladesh Awami League politician. He has two sisters, Tania Bukth and Tonyma Rahman. He was a former student of Government Laboratory High School, Dhaka. He completed his BSS from the Department of Public Administration, University of Dhaka and MBA from the Institute of Business Administration, University of Dhaka.

== Career ==
=== As cricket administrator ===
Nazmul Hassan was unanimously elected as the president of the Bangladesh Cricket Board in October 2013, succeeding AHM Mustafa Kamal, who was appointed the vice president of the ICC. He is the first elected president of the board, his predecessors were appointed by the government of Bangladesh. In the election, Papon competed with Saber Hasan Chowdhury. In 2021, he was re-elected as the board president for a third term. On 21 August 2024, He is longest serving president among test cricket nations. He announced his step down as president of the Bangladesh Cricket Board.

In 2018, Nazmul Hassan became the president of the Asian Cricket Council. After a 3-year term, he was succeeded by BCCI Secretary Jay Shah in 2021.

=== As politician ===
Nazmul Hassan was the member of parliament for the Kishoreganj-6 constituency from the Bangladesh Awami League from 2009 to 2024.

=== Others ===
Nazmul Hassan is the managing director of Beximco Pharmaceutical Limited and Shinepukur Ceramics Limited and a director of the Beximco Group. He was the president of the Abahani club for almost a decade. He headed a subcommittee in the parliament formed to investigate the manufacturing practices of pharmaceutical companies in Bangladesh.

== Controversies ==
Nazmul Hassan has faced multiple controversies during his tenure as president of the Bangladesh Cricket Board. He has been criticized for his disciplinary actions against players, including the suspension of cricketer Shakib Al Hasan. Nazmul Hassan has also been accused of pressuring players to participate in matches despite their injuries and difficulties.
