= Shafique Ahmed Siddique =

Bangladeshi academic (born 1950)

- শফিক আহমেদ সিদ্দিক

Personal details
- Born: 27 August 1950 (age 76)
- Spouse: Sheikh Rehana
- Relations: Sheikh Hasina (Sister-in-law); Tarique Ahmed Siddique (Brother); Ivy Rahman (aunt); Nazmul Hassan Papon (cousin)
- Children: Tulip; Radwan; Azmina
- Parent(s): Abu Siddique (Father); Shamsun Nahar Siddique (Mother)

Shafique Ahmed Siddique (Bengali: শফিক আহমেদ সিদ্দিক; born 27 August 1950) is a Bangladeshi Academic and former Professor of University of Dhaka. He was the Chairperson of the Governing Body of Dhaka Commerce College. He was also the Chairperson of Bangladesh University of Business and Technology and Vice-Chairperson of Association of Private Universities of Bangladesh.

== Early life ==
Siddique was born on 27 August 1950. His father was Abu Siddique and mother was Shamsun Nahar Siddique. His brothers are Tarique Ahmed Siddique, defence advisor to former Prime Minister Sheikh Hasina, and Rafique Ahmed Siddique, chairperson of Bangladesh Steel and Engineering Corporation. He completed his undergraduate degree and master's from the University of Dhaka.

== Career ==
Siddique joined the University of Dhaka in 1974 and subsequently completed a second master's in finance from Southampton University. He was promoted to assistant professor in 1986 and completed his PhD from Brunei University. From 1988 to 1992, he taught at Universiti Brunei Darussalam as an assistant professor. He was promoted to associate professor in 1993.

In 2004, Siddique filed a defamation suit against Motiur Rahman Rentu over his book, Amar Fashi Chai. In April 2007, a Dhaka court issued a verdict in favour of Siddique and awarded him 10 million taka in damages. After failing to get the compensation, Siddique filed a case seeking the confiscation of Rentu's properties on 10 August 2007.

Siddique is the founder chairperson of Bangladesh University of Business and Technology. He was the chairperson of the governing body of Dhaka Commerce College and the founding secretary of Bangabandhu Memorial Trust. He had previously served as the chairperson of Dhaka University's Bureau of Business Research. He was also the vice-chairperson of Association of Private Universities of Bangladesh.

== Personal life ==
Siddique married Sheikh Rehana in 1977 in London, sister of Prime Minister Sheikh Hasina. The couple have a son and two daughters, one of whom is Tulip Rizwana Siddiq.

On 18 February 2016, Siddique described a string of 35 cases against Mafuz Anam, editor of The Daily Star, as "too much" while on BanglaVision.
