= National Tea Company Limited =

- Formation: 1978
- Headquarters: Dhaka, Bangladesh
- Region served: Bangladesh
- Official language: Bengali
- Website: ntclbd.org

National Tea Company Limited (Bengali: ন্যাশনাল টি কোম্পানি লিমিটেড) is a Bangladeshi state owned tea company based in Dhaka. Sheikh Kabir Hossain, a relative of Sheikh Hasina, is the chairman of the company. Mr. Syed Shahriyar Ahsan is a director of the company. Syed is the managing director of Sadharan Bima Corporation of Bangladesh (SBC). He was nominated as a director of the company from Sadharan Bima Corporation on 1 October 2016. Chowdhury Nafeez Sarafat, chairman of Padma Bank, is a shareholder director of the company representing Finex Software Limited.

== History ==
National Tea Company was established in East Pakistan by the Adamjee Group of Companies. After the liberation of Bangladesh, the Adamjee family left for Karachi leaving all their East Pakistani properties behind. The National Tea Company was nationalized by the government of Bangladesh after liberation. The modern-day National Tea Company Limited was established in 1978 with the government of Bangladesh being the majority shareholder. It is the first tea company in Bangladesh jointly owned by the government and the public. The company started with Patrakhola Tea Estate, Kurmah Tea Estate, Champarai Tea Estate, Madanmohanpur Tea Estate, Madabpur Tea Estate, Jagadishpur Tea Estate, Teliapara Tea Estate, Chundeecherra Tea Estate, and Lackatoorah Tea Estate. The tea estates were taken over by the government after the end of Bangladesh Liberation War and placed under the Bangladesh Tea Industry Management Committee of the Bangladesh Tea Board. Afazuddin Fakir was appointed the first chairman of the company.

The National Tea Company Limited was listed on the Dhaka Stock Exchange in 1979.

In September 1982, the government of Bangladesh took over Parkul Tea Estate, Premnagar Tea Estate, and Bejoya Tea Estate and placed them under the National Tea Company Limited. The company produces an average of 5.2 million kilograms of tea. The company has more than 12 thousand employees and also produces rubber. Many of the workers are from ethnic minorities in Bangladesh.

In 2009, The Daily Star reported that the National Tea Company Limited saw production decline every year due to corruption and mismanagement.

On 23 June 2019, Sheikh Kabir Hossain was appointed chairman of the National Tea Company Limited replacing Munshi Shafiul Haque. In the fiscal year 2020, the company saw profits per share decline by 142 percent. In October 2021, Bangladesh Securities and Exchange Commission appointed two independent directors to the company following allegation of violation of security laws.

In February 2022, the National Tea Company Limited sought permission from the Bangladesh Securities and Exchange Commission to increase the paid up capital of the company by issuing shares. The commission appointed special auditors to investigate for embezzlement in the company and to protect the interests of the shareholders.

== List of chairmen ==
Sl no	Name	From	To	Reference
1	Afaz Uddin Fakir	21 December 1979	29 December 1980	
2	Nazmul Hassan Zahed	25 February 1981	26 December 1981	
3	Mohammad Hossain	25 February 1982	26 December 1982	
4	A. M. Sanaul Huq	16 January 1983	18 December 1985	
5	Zakir Khan Chowdhury	13 January 1986	18 August 1988	
6	S. M. Uddin	8 September 1988	31 May 1990	
7	Mohammad Ali	4 June 1990	30 April 1995	
8	Mohd. A. Harris Chowdhury	2 May 1995	3 May 1997	
9	M. A. Shahid	4 May 1997	21 April 1999	
10	Enamul Haq Mustafa Shaheed	6 May 1999	5 February 2002	
11	Mohd. A. Harris Chowdhury	6 February 2002	2 May 2007	
12	Md. Sirajul Islam	3 May 2007	24 June 2009	
13	M. A. Shahid	25 June 2009	24 May 2013	
14	A. T. M. Murtozaa Reza Chowdhury	25 May 2013	10 November 2014	
15	A. K. Abdul Mubin	11 November 2014	21 December 2016	
16	Munshi Shafiul Haque	14 June 2017	17 March 2019	
17	Sheikh Kabir Hossain	23 June 2019		
