= Young Bangla =

2014 initiative by Bangladeshi Government

- Motto: Connecting the Dots
- Commercial?: No
- Country: Bangladesh
- Ministry: Bangladeshi Government
- Key people: Sajeeb Wazed; Radwan Mujib Siddiq Bobby
- Launched: 15 November 2014; 11 years ago
- Website: youngbangla.org

Young Bangla is an initiative launched by the Bangladeshi government in 2014. The Young Bangla Programme comprises several schemes involving youth-led organizations.

== History ==
The Young Bangla campaign was launched by the government of Bangladesh on 15 November 2014 with the stated goal of training young people in Bangladesh in different skills by 2020.

== Initiatives ==
- Skill Development Mission
- Vision 2020 Internship
- Joy Bangla Youth Award
- Joy Bangla Concert
- Tiger's Den
- Youth Policy Parliament
- Idea Submission for 50 Years Celebration
- Let's Talk

== Joy Bangla Youth Award ==
Sajeeb Wazed, ICT adviser to the prime minister, presented the awards to the top 30 winners at a function held at the auditorium of the Sheikh Hasina National Youth Centre in Savar on 21 October 2017.

=== 2017 winners ===
- Kaktarua, Sylhet
- Barisal Youth Society, Barisal
- Shopno Dakho Social Welfare Organization, Jessore
- Be Related to Audio Visual Education (BRAVE), Chandpur
- Iccheypuron Samajik Sangathan, Sylhet
- Durbur Foundation, Comilla
- IPositive, Thakurgaon
- Model Live Stock Advancement Foundation, Dhaka
- Jagoron Club, Satkhira
- Potenga Protibondhi Unnoyon Shongothon, Chittagong
- Kollol Foundation, Natore
- Manobsheba Mulok Shongothon Prottoy, Moulovibazar
- Amar School, Gaibandha
- Uttaran Bangladesh, Moulovibazar
- SPaRC – Supporting People & Rebuilding Communities, Rangamati
- WFH Foundation, Dhaka
- Manob Kollankami Onathaloy, Netrokona
- Shishu Bikash, Naogaon
- Iccheypuron Samajik Sangathan, Sylhet
- Shadheen, Dinajpur

=== 2018 winners ===
- All for One Foundation, Dhaka
- Nari Shakti Jagaroni Foundation, Panchagarh
- Lalmonirhat Taekwon-Do Association
- Vorer Alo, Chattogram
- Akota Unnoyon Shongothon, Jhenidah
- Poribesh O Haor Unnoyon Shongothon, Sunamganj
- Shikkhar Alo Pathshala, Dhaka
- Prothom Surjo Agro Farm, Jashore
- Jibon, Rangamati
- Sylhet Art and Autism Foundation
- Taru Chaya, Faridpur
- Social Welfare Institute, Mymensingh
- Light of Life, Dhaka
- The Flag Girl, Dhaka
- BD Assistant, Rangpur
- Gurukul, Kushtia
- Shopno Tori Foundation, Brahmanbaria
- Youth Net for Climate Justice, Barishal
- Ghuri Foundation, Barishal
- Salandar High School Women's Basketball Team, Thakurgaon
- Shishu Nat, Sylhet
- Safal Shrimp Service Center, Satkhira
- Anushilon Mojar School, Khulna
- Pran O Prokriti, Naogaon
- Tarunno 71, Kushtia
- Student Organization of Youth Power, Gaibandha
- University Tea Student Association, Moulvibazar
- Protibondhi Kollayan Shamiti, Mymensingh
- Shopno Jatri Foundation, Chattogram
- Projukti O Projonmo, Dhaka

2020 winners

- Bloodman Healthcare
- Mastul Foundation
- World Youth Army
- Central Boys of Raozan
- Mission Save Bangladesh
- Footsteps Bangladesh
- Safety Management Foundation
- Plastic Initiative Network
- Youth Environment and Social Development Society (YESDS)
- Psycure
- Dip Medical Services & Dipasha Foundation
- Pohorchanda Adarsa Pathagar
- Uttaran Juba Sangathan
- Cinema Bangladesh
- Happy Natore
- Sashtha Indrio
- OBHIZATRIK Foundation
- Miserable Welfare Association
- Hate Khori Foundation
- Ek Takay Shikkha
- Goodfeelm
- Unmesh
- Ignite Youth Foundation (IYF)
- iTecH School
- Positive Bangladesh
- Deshi Ballers
- Youth For Change Bangladesh (YFC-BD)
- Centre for Rights & Development of persons with Disabilities (CRDD)
- Bangladesh Wheelchair Sports Foundation (BWSF)
- Hobiganj Association for Autism and Social Development (HASSI)

=== 2023 winners ===
- Udvabioni Biggan Club, Mushahid Miah
