= Md. Afzal Karim =

Bangladeshi banker and former managing director

Md. Afzal Karim is a Bangladeshi banker and former managing director of Sonali Bank Limited. Sonali Bank is the largest state owned bank in Bangladesh. He is the former managing director of Bangladesh House Building Finance Corporation. He was the chairperson of the executive committee of Bangladesh Foreign Exchange Dealers' Association. He is a director of Central Depository Bangladesh Limited.

== Early life ==
Karim was born in Mehendiganj Upazila, Barisal District. Karim completed his bachelors in mechanical engineering at the Khulna University of Engineering and Technology. He did a diploma from Bangladesh Institute of Management.

== Career ==
Karim joined Bangladesh House Building Finance Corporation in 1995 as the Senior Principal Officer. He would go on to become general manager of Bangladesh House Building Finance Corporation. He worked at Sena Kallyan Sangstha and Bangladesh Tea Board.

In 2015, Karim was the general manager of operations of the Bangladesh House Building Finance Corporation when he joined Bangladesh Krishi Bank as general manager.

From 2018 to 2020, Karim was the deputy managing director of Bangladesh Krishi Bank. In 2020, he disbursed 945 loans from the state owned bank which met only 29 percent of its disbursement target. He received an Integrity Award for his service by the Financial Institutions Department of the Ministry of Finance. He is a member of the Bangladesh Association of Banks.

On 3 March 2021, Karim was appointed managing director of Bangladesh House Building Finance Corporation; he was serving as the deputy managing director of Sonali Bank Limited. He signed a customer service agreement with Islami Bank Bangladesh Limited in August 2021.

Karim was appointed managing director of Sonali Bank Limited on 28 August 2022. He replaced Ataur Rahman Prodhan. He was appointed to the post for a three year term. He signed an agreement with Md. Monzur Mofiz, managing director of One Bank Limited so that Sonali Bank could use its financial app 'OK Wallet'. He was a director of Central Depository Bangladesh Limited. He was a director of Padma Bank Limited. He was the chairman of Bangladesh Foreign Exchange Dealers' Association.
