= Shahid Uddin Khan =

Bangladesh Army officer

- শহীদ উদ্দিন খান
- Born: 20 March 1959 (age 67); Sylhet, East Pakistan, Pakistan
- Alma mater: Military Training Bangladesh Military Academy
- Spouse: Farzana Anjum
- Children: 3
- Military career
- Allegiance: Bangladesh
- Branch: Bangladesh Army; Bangladesh Rifles
- Service years: 1981-2006
- Rank: Colonel
- Unit: Corps of Engineers
- Commands: Sector Commander of BDR; CO of 4th Engineers Regiment; CO of 31st Rifles Battalion

Shahid Uddin Khan is a retired Bangladesh Army officer who was forced into exile following a business dispute with Tarique Ahmed Siddique, defence and security adviser to the Prime Minister of Bangladesh, Sheikh Hasina. He is living in the United Kingdom. He was sentenced to nine years imprisonment in a tax evasion case.

== Career ==
Khan was the commander of the Chapainawabganj Sector of Bangladesh Rifles in 2003 when traders went on strike after his soldiers seized scrap metal to be exported to India. Regional Customs Commissioner Ali Ahmed criticised the move and claimed Bangladesh Rifles did not have the authority to seize goods and claimed they took it at gunpoint. Khan defended his troops and claimed the metal was raw material for manufacturing guns.

In 2012, a report by Salah Choudhury published in openDemocracy raised allegations that Colonel Shahid Uddin Khan was engaged in influence peddling and corrupt practices with the backing of Tarique Ahmed Siddique, defence and security adviser to the Prime Minister of Bangladesh, Sheikh Hasina. According to the report, Khan has a number of businesses in which Siddique's wife and daughter are shareholders.

According to an Al Jazeera Investigative Unit report, published on 29 March 2019, Tarique Ahmed Siddique used intelligence agencies to abduct employees of business associate Colonel Shahid Uddin Khan, who is in exile in the United Kingdom. The family members of the men have not heard from them since their abduction. As defence advisor, he had control over the intelligence agencies and the Bangladesh military.

In December 2020, Khan was sentenced to nine years in jail in a tax evasion case by Judge Mohammad Nazrul Islam. Assistant tax commissioner of Circle-9, Sheikh Ali Hasan, had filed the case against Khan on 25 September 2019. Khan was not present at the trial. His rank of colonel was scrapped in May 2021, according to a statement issued by the deputy secretary to the Ministry of Defence, Wahida Sultana. In September 2021, Khan and his wife, Farhana Anjum Khan, were sentenced to 10 years imprisonment by Judge Hafsa Jhuma for possession of counterfeit currencies worth 300 thousand BDT. The money and illegal guns were seized from his residence by Counter Terrorism and Transnational Crime. In May 2023, the Anti-Corruption Commission sued Khan, his wife, and daughters Shetaz Munasi Khan and Parisa Pinaz Khan for 397.3 million in illegal wealth.

In April 2025, a travel ban was issued against Khan, his wife, and daughters following corruption allegation against Prochchhaya Limited. He is the chairman of Prochchhaya Limited.
