= Motiur Rahman Rentu =

Bangladeshi freedom fighter and writer of Amar Fashi Chai

- মতিউর রহমান রেন্টু
- Born: 1956; Muksudpur, Gopalganj District, East Bengal, Pakistan (present day Gopalganj, Bangladesh)
- Died: November 10, 2007 (aged 53); Paris, France
- Citizenship: Pakistan (1956-1971); Bangladesh (1971-2003); France (2004-2007)
- Occupations: Politician and Writer
- Notable work: Amar Fashi Chai
- Political party: Awami League (?-1997)
- Spouse: Moyna Rahman
- Children: 2

Motiur Rahman Rentu was a Bangladeshi politician and a writer. He has been widely popularity for his book Amar Fashi Chai, which vehemently criticized former prime minister of Bangladesh Sheikh Hasina, during whose rule the book was banned.

== Early life ==
Born in 1954, Rentu was the son of Abdul Barik from Muksudpur Upazila in Gopalganj.

== Career ==
Rentu fought in the Bangladesh Liberation War of 1971 as a fighter of the Mukti Bahini. He maintained close working relationships with Awami League Chairperson Sheikh Hasina from 1981 to 1997, and was her colleague and adviser.

On June 20, 2000, at around 3:30 PM, he was shot at his residence on 9 No. BK Das Road. He sustained four bullet wounds in the attack but was able to survive. The incident significantly changed Motiur Rahman Rentu's life, leading him to write another book titled The Prime Minister of the Hidden Assassins, where he details the assassination attempt on him.

== Personal life ==
Rentu married Moyna Rahman, and together they have two daughters. Now, his family lives in Paris, France. In 2003, Motiur Rahman Rentu left Bangladesh with his wife and two daughters. After spending a year in various countries across Europe, he settled permanently in Paris. This move was part of his efforts to escape the political turmoil and threats he faced in Bangladesh.

== Death ==
Rentu died at the age of 53 on November 10, 2007, in Paris after battling lung cancer. He was laid to rest in Paris.

== Bibliography ==
In 1999, the book Amar Fashi Chai was published, after which it was banned by the Awami League government. Following the ban, there were attempts to assassinate Motiur Rahman. Rentu's life and work are considered an inseparable part of Bangladesh's political history. His books became very popular after the fall of Sheikh Hasina following the July Revolution.

- Rentu, Motiur (1999). আমার ফাঁসি চাই (in Bengali). Shornolota O Bonolota. ASIN B0DM1TRPYM.
- Rentu, Motiur (2003). অন্তরালের হত্যাকারী প্রধানমন্ত্রী (in Bengali). ASIN B0DM4F8N2J.

== See also ==
- Amar Fashi Chai
- Assassination of Ziaur Rahman
