= Tulip Siddiq =

British politician (born 1982)

Tulip Siddiq MP FRSA
- Official portrait, 2026

Economic Secretary to the Treasury City Minister
- In office 9 July 2024 – 14 January 2025
- Prime Minister: Keir Starmer
- Chancellor: Rachel Reeves
- Preceded by: Bim Afolami
- Succeeded by: Emma Reynolds

Shadow Economic Secretary to the Treasury
- In office 4 December 2021 – 5 July 2024
- Leader: Keir Starmer
- Preceded by: Pat McFadden
- Succeeded by: Alan Mak

Shadow Minister for Children and Early Years
- In office 7 January 2020 – 4 December 2021
- Leader: Jeremy Corbyn; Keir Starmer
- Preceded by: Tracy Brabin
- Succeeded by: Helen Hayes
- In office 9 October 2016 – 26 January 2017
- Leader: Jeremy Corbyn
- Preceded by: Jenny Chapman
- Succeeded by: Tracy Brabin

Member of Parliament for Hampstead and Highgate Hampstead and Kilburn (2015–2024)
- Incumbent
- Assumed office 7 May 2015
- Preceded by: Glenda Jackson
- Majority: 13,970 (28.8%)

Camden London Borough Councillor for Regent's Park
- In office 6 May 2010 – 22 May 2014
- Preceded by: Theodore Blackwell
- Succeeded by: Nadia Shah

Personal details
- Born: Tulip Rizwana Siddiq; 16 September 1982 (age 44) St Helier, London, England
- Party: Labour
- Spouse: Christian Percy (m. 2013)
- Children: 2
- Parents: Shafique Ahmed Siddique (father); Sheikh Rehana (mother)
- Relatives: Tungipara Sheikh family (maternal family)
- Education: University College London (BA); King's College London (MA, MA)
- Website: www.tulipsiddiq.com

Tulip Rizwana Siddiq FRSA (born 16 September 1982) is a British politician who has been the Member of Parliament (MP) for Hampstead and Highgate, previously Hampstead and Kilburn, since 2015. She served as Economic Secretary to the Treasury and City Minister from 9 July 2024 until her resignation on 14 January 2025.

She is a niece of the ousted Prime Minister of Bangladesh, Sheikh Hasina. On 13 April 2025, Bangladesh issued an arrest warrant for Siddiq as part of investigations into corruption during Sheikh Hasina's premiership, and on 1 December 2025 she was convicted in absentia and sentenced to two years' imprisonment and a fine. In November 2025, senior lawyers including Dominic Grieve, Robert Buckland, Cherie Blair, Philippe Sands and Geoffrey Robertson raised concerns about the fairness of the proceedings, arguing that Siddiq had not been given an adequate opportunity to respond to the allegations or obtain effective legal representation.

== Early life and education ==
Tulip Siddiq was born on 16 September 1982 in Sutton, London. She is the daughter of academic Prof. Shafique Ahmed Siddique, and politician Sheikh Rehana, who gained political asylum in the UK as a teenager. The two met when Shafique Siddique was doing his PhD, and married in Kilburn in 1980. Siddiq was born in St Helier Hospital in St Helier, London, and has an elder brother, Radwan Mujib Siddiq Bobby, and a younger sister, Azmina Siddiq. When she was 15, the family moved to Hampstead. She was raised a Muslim and has said that her "family embraced multicultural Britain".

She attended Scholastica, Dhaka, Bangladesh, The Royal School, Hampstead, and Mill Hill School before completing her undergraduate degree in English Literature at University College London and then a master's degree at King's College London. In September 2011, she completed a second master's degree in Politics, Policy and Government.

Her maternal grandfather is Sheikh Mujibur Rahman, the founding leader, second prime minister of Bangladesh, and its first president. Her mother's elder sister, Sheikh Hasina, was prime minister of Bangladesh from 1996 to 2001 and from 2009 until her resignation amid the July Revolution in 2024.

In 2017, Siddiq said she was British, not Bangladeshi, but Bangladeshi officials stated that she held Bangladeshi citizenship, having had multiple Bangladeshi passports, an ID card and with her name in the voter registry. Siddiq's lawyer denied these Bangladeshi documents existed, and suggested they were fabrications. However, a collaborated investigation by Prothom Alo daily in Dhaka and The Times in London documented evidence revealing that Siddiq held a national identity card (NID) as a Bangladeshi citizen, was registered to vote in Bangladesh, and also held a Bangladeshi passport.

== Early political career ==
At the age of 16, Siddiq joined the Labour Party. Her father had a stroke, which left him disabled and unable to speak for five years. She has cited the National Health Service and the care her disabled father received as the reason why she joined. She identified former Labour minister Barbara Castle as her political heroine, and has described her mother and maternal aunt as "two very strong feminists".

In a 2006 by-election, Siddiq stood unsuccessfully for Camden Council. In the 2010 local government elections, she became the first female Bangladeshi councillor for Camden Council, for Regent's Park ward, where she was Cabinet Member for Culture and Communities until May 2014.

Circa 2009, she worked for the Bangladesh Awami League political party in the UK and EU lobbying unit and election strategy team, and appeared on BBC television as a spokesperson for the Awami League.

In July 2013, Siddiq was selected by local party members as the Labour prospective parliamentary candidate for the Hampstead and Kilburn constituency, despite a smear campaign. She later said that because of her Muslim surname, she was advised against standing in the constituency by senior party members, due to Hampstead's large Jewish population. During 2013 and 2014, she campaigned against the proposed high-speed railway expansion High Speed 2, and high payday lender charges on Kilburn High Road. She also campaigned in support of local services, such as to keep Belsize Fire Station open, to improve disabled access at West Hampstead tube station, and to save the Swiss Cottage post office.

== Parliamentary career ==
=== 1st term (2015–2017) ===
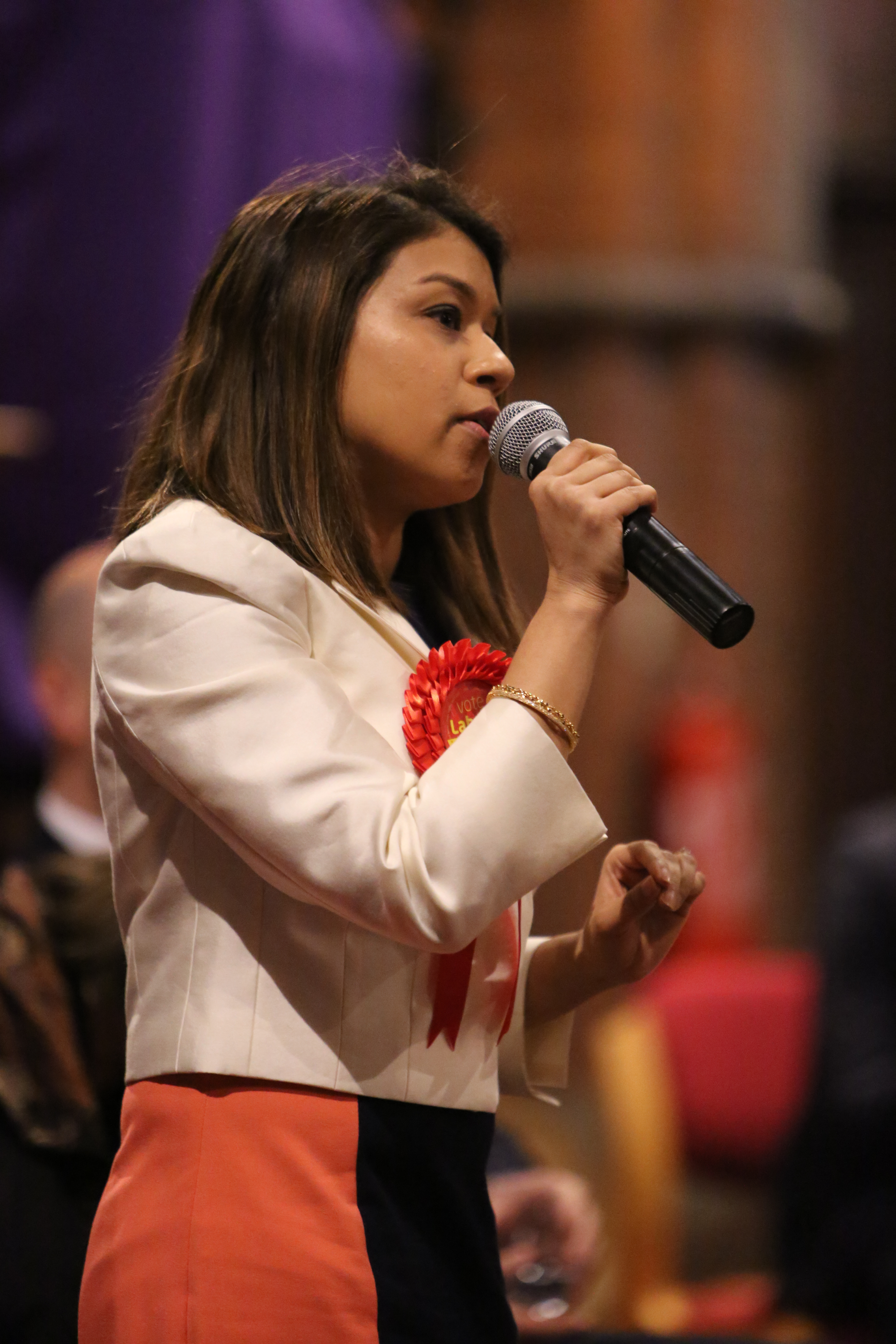
Siddiq speaking at a Hampstead and Kilburn hustings in 2015

At the 2015 general election, Siddiq was elected to Parliament as MP for Hampstead and Kilburn with 44.4% of the vote and a majority of 1,138.

In June 2015, Siddiq was appointed a vice-chair of the All-Party Parliamentary Group Against Antisemitism. She is also a member of the Women and Equalities Select Committee. In the same month, she was one of 36 Labour MPs to nominate Jeremy Corbyn as a candidate in the Labour leadership election, although she later supported Andy Burnham.

In September 2015, Siddiq, along with Keir Starmer and Catherine West, wrote a letter to British prime minister David Cameron seeking urgent action to address the refugee crisis due to the Syrian civil war. In the same month, she was appointed Permanent Private Secretary to the Shadow Minister for Culture, Media and Sport, Michael Dugher. In November 2015, she campaigned against changes to junior doctor contracts. In the same month, Siddiq's maiden speech in Parliament was judged one of the top seven from 2015's intake of MPs by the BBC. In October 2016, she was appointed as Shadow Education Minister in the Labour Party's frontbench in Parliament, taking on the childcare and early years education brief and working with Shadow Secretary of State for Education Angela Rayner.

In November 2016, Siddiq supported a motion in Parliament for the UK to withdraw support for the Saudi Arabian-led intervention in Yemen. In January 2017, she resigned from the Labour frontbench over Labour's three-line whip, to vote against triggering Article 50 of the Treaty on European Union. She stated that because around 75% of her Hampstead and Kilburn constituency had voted to remain in the European Union as one of the top 10 remain areas, she could not support Labour's position though with a "heavy heart". She won an endorsement from Camden for Europe, Open Britain and Best for Britain, due to her decision to vote against Article 50. In May 2017, ahead of the 2017 general election, Siddiq supported a group of Labour MPs who argued Labour should stand down in certain Green party target seats where they were more likely than Labour to defeat the Conservatives.

=== 2nd term (2017–2019) ===
At the snap 2017 general election, Siddiq was re-elected as MP for Hampstead and Kilburn with an increased vote share of 59% and an increased majority of 15,560.

In August 2017, Siddiq called for businesses to "address imbalance" in the employment of people from ethnic minorities to improve the diversity of its workforce. In September 2017, she was appointed as chair of the new Childcare and Early Education All-Party Parliamentary Group (APPG). In the same month, she wrote to the Home Office to ask for children's passports to be amended to contain both their parents' names to avoid confusion at airports and borders. She had been stopped with her daughter at UK border control whilst returning from a family holiday until her husband joined them, because she did not have the same surname in her passport as her child.

In November 2017, whilst campaigning for the release of her constituent, the British-Iranian citizen Nazanin Zaghari-Ratcliffe, who was detained in Iran, she was asked by Alex Thomson of Channel 4 News and ITN about using her family ties to the Bangladeshi government, led by her aunt, in order to liberate British Bangladeshi barrister Ahmad Bin Quasem, who is thought to have been abducted by state security forces in Bangladesh. The programme's editor, Ben de Pear, complained about Siddiq's "threatening behaviour" to a pregnant producer, while Siddiq complained to the police about her interlocutors. She later apologised in a statement to the producer, Daisy Ayliffe, for the offence caused.

In May 2018, Siddiq supported an equal pay campaign aimed at building pressure on employers. In the same month, she described the actions of the Israeli military during demonstrations on the Gaza border as "unjustified" and "inhumane". She said: "I condemn without reservation these violations of international law and human rights by Israel... The protest has been twofold – to highlight the shocking conditions which Palestinians are forced to live in and to demand their right to return to their homes..." In August 2018, she joined international calls for her aunt's government to release Bangladeshi photographer Shahidul Alam, who had been jailed after reporting about protests by schoolchildren over road safety problems, and had subsequently stated he was tortured.

=== Campaign for Nazanin Zaghari-Ratcliffe ===
Siddiq's British-Iranian constituent Nazanin Zaghari-Ratcliffe was arrested and detained in April 2016 while visiting Iran, for allegedly plotting against the government, charges she always disputed.

In 2017, giving evidence to the foreign affairs select committee as foreign secretary at the time, Boris Johnson said Zaghari-Ratcliffe had been in Tehran to train journalists, when she had travelled to Iran to see her parents with her child, Gabriella. Johnson's remarks were seized upon by the Islamic Revolutionary Guards Corps and following pressure from the Zahari-Ratcliffe family and their MP Tulip Siddiq he was forced to apologise.

Siddiq led the parliamentary and media campaigning, repeatedly securing parliamentary time to raise the case, calling on the Conservative administration to 'do everything possible' as part of their 'moral and consular duty.'

Zaghari-Ratcliffe release

When Nazanin was released and returned to the UK in March 2022, Siddiq was among those publicly celebrating the outcome and described the release as "the highlight of my career." Nazanin had said Siddiq was 'one of the first people she wanted to see' upon her return.

Siddiq gave a welcome home message in the House of Commons to her constituent, paying tribute to Nazanin's husband Richard for his campaign, saying 'he had set the bar high for all husbands.' Siddiq was applauded in the Commons as she thanked MPs who campaigned to help secure Nazanin Zaghari-Ratcliffe's release.

For her advocacy on Nazanin's behalf, Siddiq received an award from the organisation Hostage Aid.

=== 3rd term (2019–2024) ===
Siddiq was again re-elected at the 2019 general election, with a decreased vote share of 48.9% and a decreased majority of 14,188.

=== 4th term (since 2024) ===
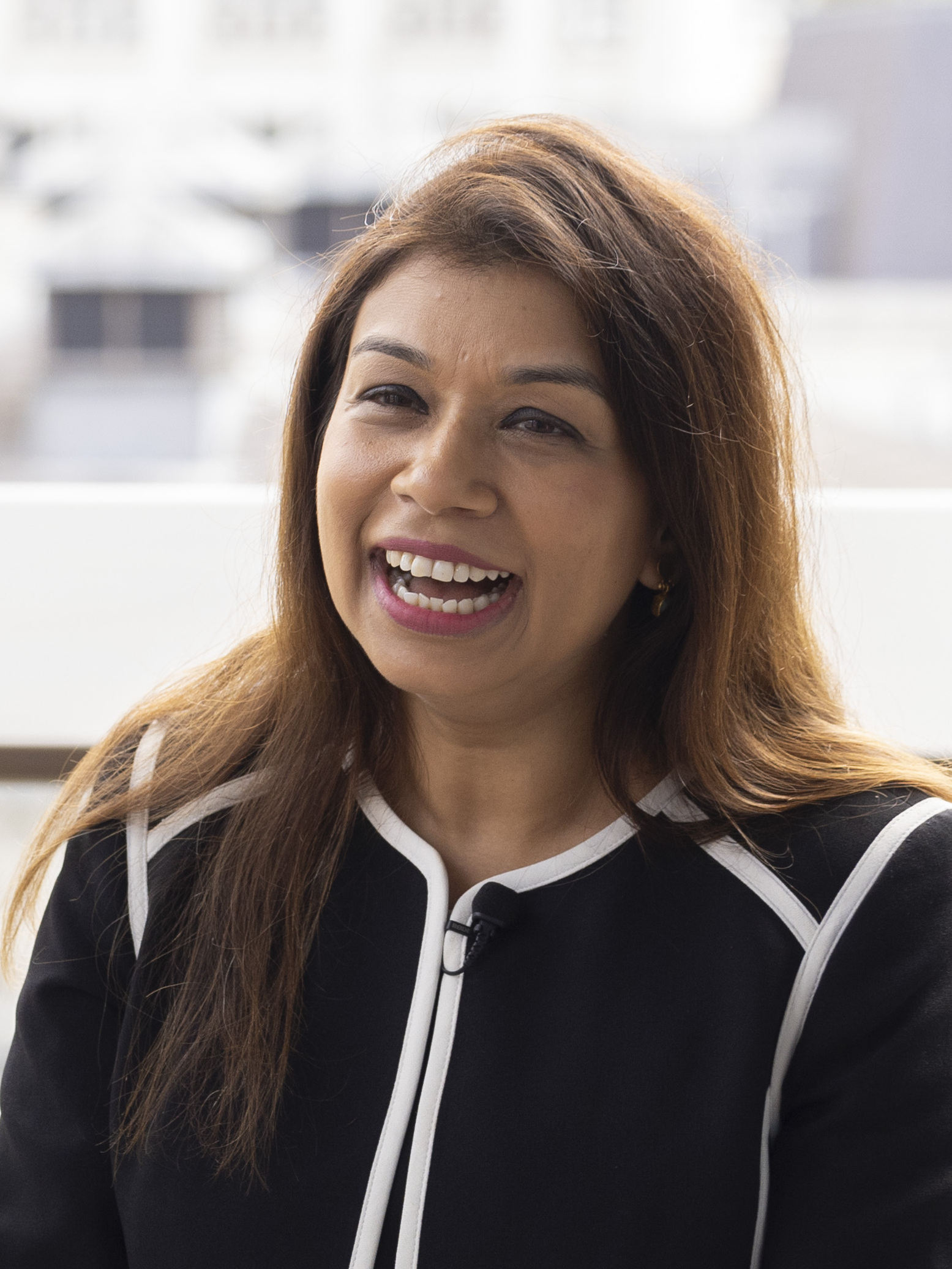
Siddiq in 2024

Due to the 2023 Periodic Review of Westminster constituencies, Siddiq's constituency of Hampstead and Kilburn was abolished, and replaced with Hampstead and Highgate. At the 2024 general election, Siddiq was elected to Parliament as MP for Hampstead and Highgate with 48.3% of the vote and a majority of 14,970.

In December 2024, Bangladesh's Anti-Corruption Commission (ACC) named Siddiq in an investigation into infrastructure projects, including a 2013 deal with Russia for Rooppur Nuclear Power Plant, in which it is claimed up to £3.9 billion was embezzled. Siddiq attended the nuclear deal's signing at the Kremlin alongside her aunt Bangladesh PM Sheikh Hasina and Russian president Vladimir Putin. The investigation was started through a court application brought by a political opponent of Siddiq's aunt. Siddiq's current parliamentary brief includes regulating corruption in the financial sector. On 19 December, Siddiq had a meeting with the Cabinet Office Propriety and Ethics Team to discuss the allegations. Following the Financial Times reporting that a developer with links to the Awami League gave a flat bought in 2001 for £195,000 to Siddiq without charge in 2004, rather than being a gift from her parents as previously reported, Siddiq referred herself on 6 January 2025 to the prime minister's Independent Adviser on Ministers' Interests to independently establish the facts. She later stated the flat was a gift from her non-political godfather, although two years earlier she had told a newspaper that her parents had bought the flat for her. Siddiq continued to be subject to considerable media attention about her political future after the announcement.

The ACC later named Siddiq in another investigation into the alleged illegal allocation of 21,600 square feet (0.5 acres) of diplomatic zone land to Siddiq's mother and siblings. The affidavit filed by the ACC stated "it is known that [Ms Siddiq] exerted pressure and influence ... for the allotment of plots in the same project in the names of her mother, Mrs Rehana Siddiq, her sister Ms Azmina Siddiq, and her brother Mr Radwan Mujib Siddiq." A spokesperson said that Siddiq rebutted the claim. In April 2025, a Bangladeshi judge issued an arrest warrant for Siddiq related to the land transfer.

On 14 January 2025, the report of the Independent Adviser on Ministers' Interests, Sir Laurie Magnus, was published, in which he stated while he found no evidence of improprieties it was regrettable Siddiq "was not more alert to the potential reputational risks", but the shortcomings were not a breach of the Ministerial Code, though he advised the prime minister to "consider her ongoing responsibilities". Magnus also said that he had found no evidence to suggest that Siddiq's or her husband's financial assets, as disclosed to him, derived from anything other than legitimate means. Later that day Siddiq resigned from government, stating that although she had not breached the ministerial code, the ethics investigation was a distraction from the work of government.

Tulip Siddiq's Campaign for Stronger Safeguarding in Nurseries

Tulip Sidddiq is campaigning for stronger protections for children in nurseries following the abuse committed by Vincent Chan at a nursery in her constituency. Working alongside affected parents, she has raised their concerns with the Prime Minister and used public commentary to pressor mandatory nursery CCTV with strict safeguards governing privacy, access and storage. Her campaign also calls for a reporting system that identifies patterns of safeguarding concerns stronger controls on digital devices and a requirement for two adults to be present in certain childcare settings. She acknowledges that cameras alone cannot prevent abuse, presenting them as part of wider reforms to strengthen oversight and protect children. She is also urging a review of whether existing laws adequately protect children from exploitative images.

== Other activities ==
Siddiq was a board member of West Euston Partnership and is governor of the Camden and Islington NHS Foundation Trust. She served as national BAME (Black, Asian and Minority Ethnic) Officer for Young Labour and Women's Officer for London Young Labour. She is an executive board member of Unite the Union, a member of the Co-operative Party, a fellow of the Royal Society of Arts and is also a member of the Commonwealth Journalists Association (UK). She also oversaw Camden's engagement with the 2012 London Olympics, which saw the launch of three legacy schemes to encourage more physical activities, Camden Sports Academy, School and Community Games, and Pro-Active Ambassadors.

== Recognition ==
In January 2013, Siddiq was named in the "British Bangladeshi Power & Inspiration 100". In December 2014, she was named by The Guardian as "one to watch" in British politics. In April 2015, The Sunday Times described her as one of the "rising stars" of the Labour Party.

In December 2022, Siddiq was shortlisted for the New Statesman Positive Impact Award for her campaign for the releases of her constituent Nazanin Zahari Ratcliffe from detention in Iran. Of the award, Siddiq said: "getting my constituent Nazanin Zaghari-Ratcliffe home earlier this year will likely be one of the biggest victories of my political life. After spending six years of sleepless nights wondering if she will ever be reunited with her husband and young daughter, her safe return home made me feel like my work does make a difference."

== Controversies ==
=== Remarks to Channel 4 producer ===
In November 2017, Siddiq apologised for offensive remarks directed at a pregnant Channel 4 producer. The incident occurred after the producer questioned Siddiq about her perceived failure to address the enforced disappearance of British-trained barrister Mir Ahmad Bin Quasem in Bangladesh during her aunt Sheikh Hasina's tenure as Prime Minister, a government widely criticized for human rights abuses and authoritarian rule. Siddiq said that she could not answer, having no place in Bangladeshi intelligence or government, nationality or citizenship, being a British-born UK citizen working in the British government.

After the interview with Channel 4 News reporter Alex Thomson, Siddiq is quoted as saying to the producer "Thanks Daisy for coming. Hope you have a great birth because child labour is hard." Thomson interpreted this as a "hostile statement" and complained to several bodies and organisations about the apparent threat. In 2018, Siddiq praised Sheikh Hasina, calling her a "great role model" for her daughter.

=== Allegations of ties to the Bangladesh Awami League ===
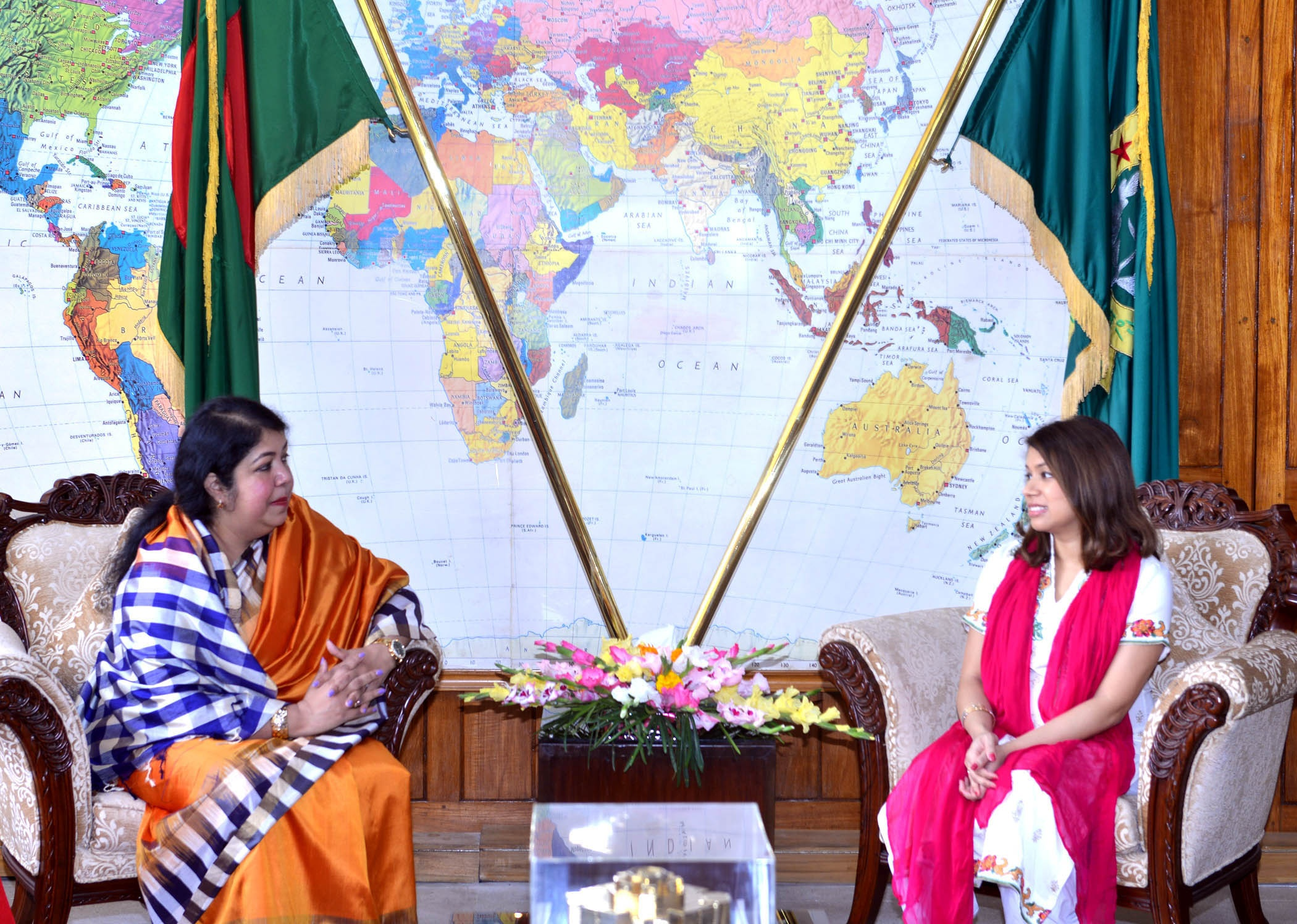
Siddiq at a meeting with former Speaker of Jatiya Sangsad Shirin Sharmin Chaudhury in 2015 in Bangladesh.

In 2019, Siddiq denied involvement in Bangladeshi politics but faced accusations of utilizing Awami League supporters in her Hampstead and Kilburn campaign. Footage from a 2017 meeting showed her expressing gratitude to these supporters, stating, "Without your support, I would not have been able to win my seat." Previously, she acknowledged working for the Awami League's EU and UK lobbying unit and election strategy team. Two Labour officials also claimed that the Awami League supported her 2024 election campaign.

In 2015, Siddiq spoke at an event for the Centre for Research and Information (CRI), a group accused of disseminating misinformation in support of Sheikh Hasina's government. Siddiq praised her aunt's leadership at the event, despite later attempts to distance herself from Bangladeshi politics.

In August 2024, it was revealed that Siddiq resided in a property owned by a businessman with close ties to the Awami League.

In January 2025, it was revealed that Siddiq was gifted a flat in London in 2004 by Abdul Motalif, a property developer linked to the Awami League. Following these revelations, she referred herself to the ministerial standards watchdog for an independent investigation. In the same month, The Telegraph reported that Siddiq, along with Awami League MP Kazi Nabil Ahmed, attended two matches of the 2019 Cricket World Cup as a freebie. The cost of each ticket was £358.80, including lunch.

=== Parliamentary Commissioner for Standards Investigation ===
In July 2024, the Parliamentary Commissioner for Standards investigated Siddiq for failing to declare income from a rental property. The commissioner concluded that the omission was "inadvertent" and accepted Siddiq's explanation for the late registration.

=== Anti-corruption investigation in Bangladesh ===
In December 2024, Bangladesh's Anti-Corruption Commission named Siddiq in an investigation alleging embezzlement of up to £3,900,000,000 from infrastructure projects. She was alleged to have helped set up a meeting with the Russian government in 2013 to discuss the Rooppur Nuclear Power Plant. The allegations involved her family, including her aunt, ousted prime minister Sheikh Hasina. The claims originated from a legal case filed by Bobby Hajjaj, a political opponent of Hasina's party. Siddiq denied any involvement, and the Prime Minister's Office stated on 19 December 2024 that Prime Minister Keir Starmer maintained confidence in her as Economic Secretary to the Treasury. Bangladesh's Anti-Corruption Commission (ACC) confirmed it is liaising with almost twelve countries to repatriate money allegedly laundered by Tulip Siddiq and her families.

She resigned her ministerial position on 14 January 2025, maintaining her innocence but acknowledging that the ongoing situation could distract from the government's work. Prime Minister Keir Starmer accepted her resignation, noting that no evidence of financial misconduct had been found. The UK Anti-Corruption Coalition had called for Siddiq to relinquish her economic crime responsibilities due to a potential conflict of interest, given her family ties to the deposed regime in Bangladesh.

On 13 April 2025, the ACC issued an arrest warrant against Siddiq as part of an investigation into her alleged involvement in corruption during Sheikh Hasina's premiership, with Siddiq being accused of illegally receiving land. Siddiq's lawyers noted that she denies the charges, which they said were "politically motivated", adding that the ACC had not brought forward any evidence to support its arrest warrant.

In August 2025, Siddiq was tried in absentia in Bangladesh over allegations that she had used her influence with her aunt, former prime minister Sheikh Hasina, to secure a plot of land in Dhaka for her mother, Sheikh Rehana. Siddiq denied the allegations, describing the proceedings as politically motivated. On 1 December 2025, she was convicted and sentenced to two years' imprisonment and a fine of 100,000 taka (£620). The UK does not have an extradition treaty with Bangladesh and it seems unlikely Siddiq will serve the sentence. She faces a number of further charges. The Labour Party stated that it would not recognise the judgment nor subject her to party disciplinary action due to the conviction. Siddiq responded to the conviction saying "The outcome of this kangaroo court is as predictable as it is unjustified. I hope this so-called 'verdict' will be treated with the contempt it deserves." In November 2025, senior lawyers including Dominic Grieve, Robert Buckland, Cherie Blair, Philippe Sands and Geoffrey Robertson raised concerns about the fairness of the proceedings, arguing that Siddiq had not been given an adequate opportunity to respond to the allegations or obtain effective legal representation.

== Personal life ==
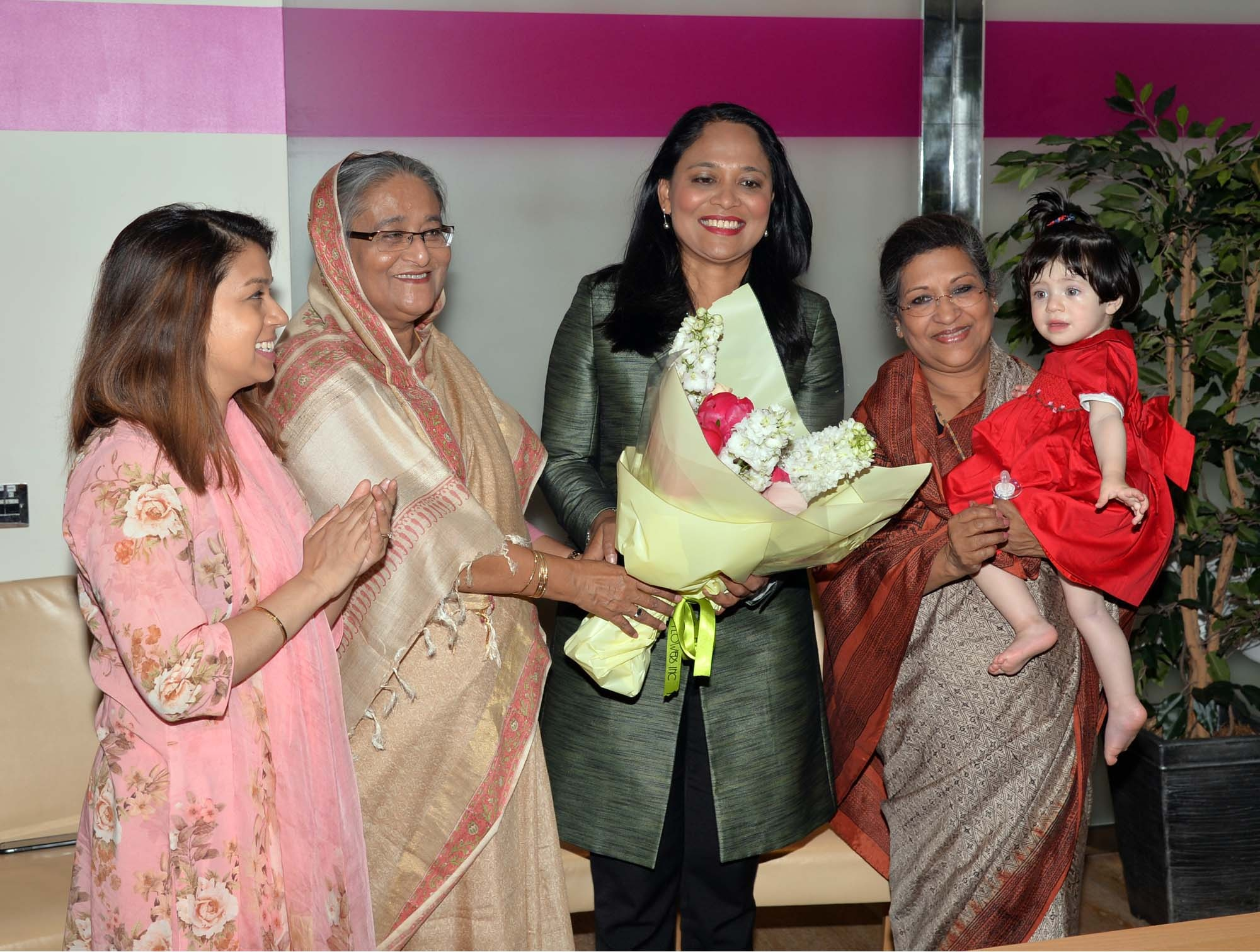
Siddiq with her mother Sheikh Rehana, her aunt ousted Prime Minister of Bangladesh Sheikh Hasina and former British MP Rushanara Ali in 2017.

Siddiq is a Muslim, but said she is "more cultural than religious". In 2013, she married Christian Percy, a strategy consultant who formerly worked in the Foreign and Commonwealth Office. In April 2016, Siddiq gave birth to a daughter at the Royal Free Hospital in Hampstead. She gave birth to a son in January 2019. Two days before the birth she attended the Commons in a wheelchair, for a critical Brexit-related vote. On 29 January 2019, following a change in House of Commons standing orders, she became the first ever MP to vote by proxy.

Since becoming an MP, Siddiq has spoken at Limmud and attends synagogue events. In April 2019, she announced that a relative had died in the 2019 Sri Lanka Easter bombings. This relative was Siddiq's second-cousin-once-removed, Zayan Chowdhury, who was a grandson of Siddiq's first-cousin-once-removed, Sheikh Fazlul Karim Selim, a former MP of Bangladesh.

Siddiq and her family live in a semi-detached house in East Finchley rented from an official of the London branch of the Bangladesh Awami League.

In 2024, the Financial Times reported that Siddiq's and Labour leader Keir Starmer's families were close friends.

== In popular culture ==
Siddiq was portrayed by Farzana Dua Elahe in the 2025 BBC One mini-series Prisoner 951, which recounted the imprisonment and eventual release of Zaghari-Ratcliffe.

Parliament of the United Kingdom
Preceded by Glenda Jackson	Member of Parliament for Hampstead and Kilburn; 2015–2024	Constituency abolished
New constituency	Member of Parliament for Hampstead and Highgate; 2024–present	Incumbent
