= Sayera Khatun =

Mother of Mujibur Rahman (1886–1975)

Sheikh Sayera Khatun
- শেখ সায়েরা খাতুন
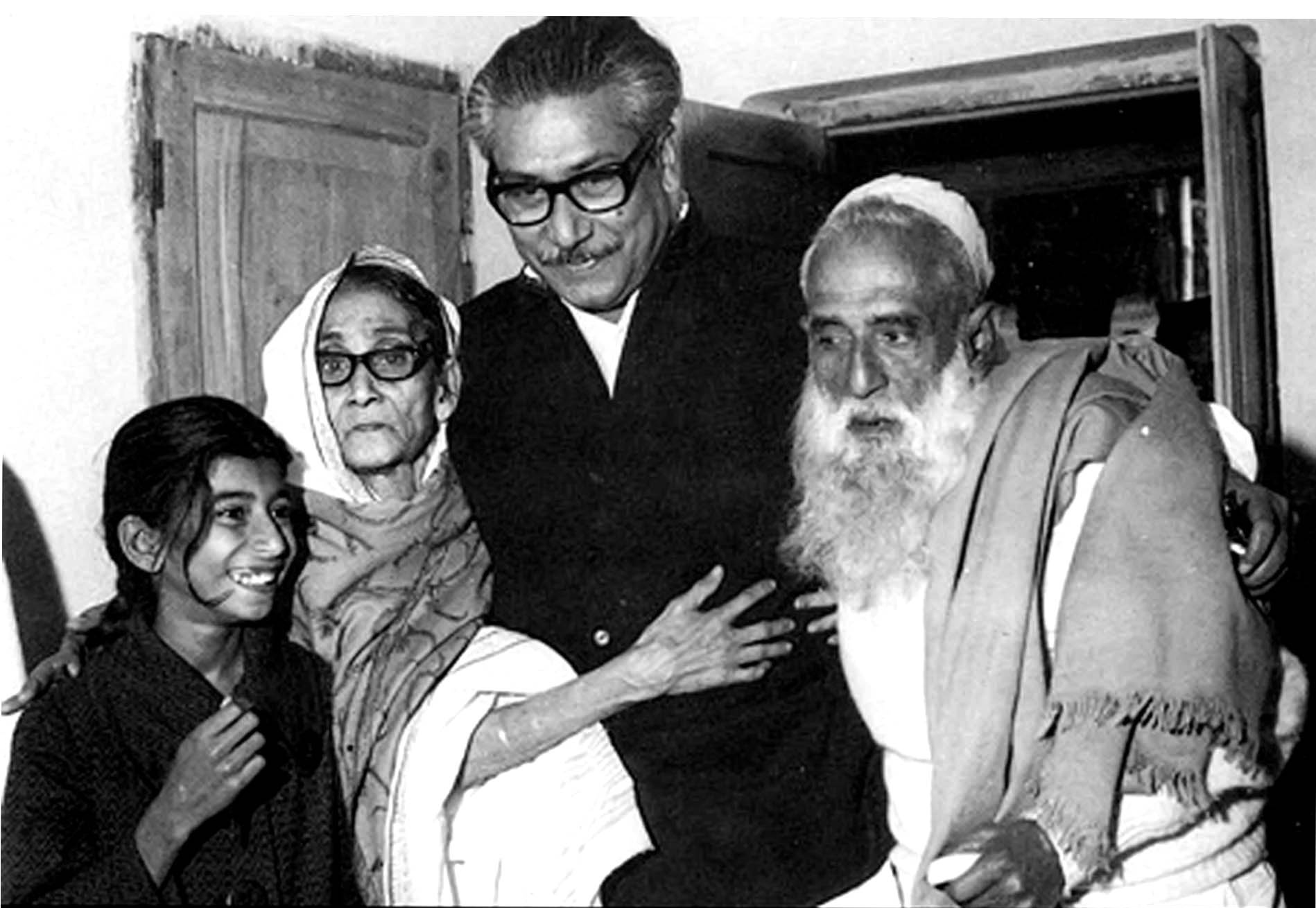
- Sayera with her son (Sheikh Mujibur Rahman) and husband (Lutfur Rahman)
- Born: 1886; Tungipara, Bengal, British India
- Died: 31 May 1975 (aged 89); Dacca, Bangladesh
- Resting place: Mausoleum of Sheikh Mujibur Rahman
- Occupation: Housewife
- Known for: Being the mother of Sheikh Mujibur Rahman
- Spouse: Sheikh Lutfar Rahman
- Children: 6, including Sheikh Mujibur Rahman and Sheikh Abu Naser
- Family: Tungipara Sheikh family

Sheikh Sayera Khatun (1886 – 31 May 1975) was the matriarch of Sheikh-Wazed political family and mother of Sheikh Mujibur Rahman, the founding president of Bangladesh. She was the grandmother of the former Prime Minister of Bangladesh, Sheikh Hasina.

== Biography ==
Sheikh Sayera Khatun was born to Sheikh Abdul Majid in 1886. She was married to her paternal first-cousin Sheikh Lutfar Rahman, the son of her father's brother Sheikh Abdul Hamid. Her father had four daughters, so when she married her cousin she inherited all the family property. She lived in Tungipara Upazila, Gopalganj District. She had six children, four girls and two boys. Her two sons were Sheikh Mujibur Rahman and Sheikh Abu Naser and her daughters were Sheikh Fatema Begum, Sheikh Asia Begum, Sheikh Amena Begum, and Khadijah Hossain Lily.

=== 1971 Liberation war ===
During the Bangladesh Liberation War, Sheikh Sayera Khatun and her husband Sheikh Lutfar Rahman, along with the family of Sheikh Mujibur Rahman were put under arrest by the Pakistan Army. Initially, Sayera Khatun and her husband were in Khulna at their younger son Naser's house in Khulna, but was later sent away to their ancestral home in Gopalganj. On April 8, 1971, the Pakistan Army looted ornaments and other valuables from the house and later bulldozed and set fire to it. The soldiers also shot dead four relatives and two servants of the household. Sayera Khatun and her husband were rendered homeless until the local Awami League activists built them a temporary shed which was also destroyed by the Pakistan Army after twenty days. They were then sent away to Dhaka where they were put under arrest with their elder son's family.

== Death and legacy ==
Sayera Khatun died on 31 May 1975 in Dhaka, Bangladesh. Sheikh Sayera Khatun Medical College and Hospital in Gopalganj District was named after her. The colle annually in Bangabandhu Bhaban and Bangabandhu Memorial Museum in Dhanmondi, Dhaka, by Bangladesh Awami League and members of the Sheikh-Wazed family members.
