= Radwan Mujib Siddiq Bobby =

Bangladeshi politician, magazine editor (born 1980)

- রাদওয়ান মুজিব সিদ্দিক ববি
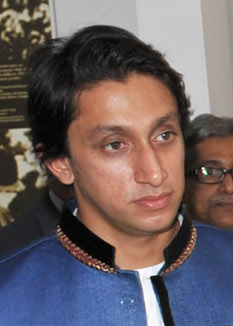
- Bobby in 2015
- Born: 21 May 1980 (age 46); United Kingdom
- Education: London School of Economics
- Political party: Awami League
- Spouse: Peppi Siddiq
- Children: 2
- Parents: Shafique Ahmed Siddique (father); Sheikh Rehana (mother)
- Relatives: Sheikh Mujibur Rahman (grandfather); Sheikh Fazilatunnesa Mujib (grandmother); Tulip Siddiq (sister)
- Family: See Tungipara Sheikh family

Radwan Mujib Siddiq Bobby (Note: Bengali: রাদওয়ান মুজিব সিদ্দিক ববি); born 21 May 1980) is a British-Bangladeshi strategy consultant, politician, policy magazine editor and businessman. He is a trustee of the center-left think tank, Centre for Research and Information of Awami League. He is a son of Sheikh Rehana, the youngest daughter of Sheikh Mujibur Rahman. His sister, Tulip Siddiq, is a British Labour Party politician and former Economic Secretary to the Treasury.

== Early life and education ==
Radwan was born on 21 May 1980 in the United Kingdom. He is a London School of Economics graduate in political science.

== Career ==
Radwan looks after the institution as a trustee of Center for Research and Information (CRI), the research institute aligned with Awami League's 'Young Bangla'. In August 2022, Radwan served as Strategic Advisor – Governance at UNDP Bangladesh.

In April 2025, the Anti-Corruption Commission seized Radwan's properties and those of his family members after filing a successful petition with Dhaka Metropolitan Senior Special Judge Md Zakir Hossain. The seizures were linked to corruption cases involving the allocation of government-developed plots of land, in which Radwan and other members of Sheikh Hasina's family were later tried and convicted in absentia. In the same plot allocation case involving Tulip Siddiq, a group of British lawyers described the proceedings as "contrived and unfair". He is a councilor of Bangladesh Awami League. In February 2026, he was sentenced to 7 years in jail for the Purbachal scam cases.

== Personal life ==
Radwan is the eldest among the brothers and sisters. He is married to Peppi Siddiq, a Finnish citizen. Together they have a daughter and a son.
