= The Daily Dinkal =

Bengali language newspaper in Bangladesh

Daily Dinkal
- Type: Daily Newspaper
- Format: Broadsheet and Online Version
- Publisher: Atiqur Rahman Rumon
- Founded: 1986; 40 years ago
- Relaunched: 1 September 2024
- Political alignment: Centre to centre-right
- Language: Bengali
- Headquarters: Tejgaon, Dhaka, Bangladesh
- Country: Bangladesh
- Circulation: 15,580
- Website: dainikdinkal.net

Dainik Dinkal is a daily newspaper published in the Bengali language. The newspaper is also known as the mouthpiece of the Bangladesh Nationalist Party (BNP) and is published from Dhaka. On February 19, 2023, the Bangladesh Press Council announced the closure of the publication of the newspaper. However later on 11 August 2024, the publication of the newspaper was approved.

== History ==
Dainik Dinkal was first published in 1986, edited by Sanaulah Nuri and published by Majedur Rahman. Later on April 16, 2002, Tarique Rahman, the chairman of the BNP, took over the responsibility of the publisher and printer of the newspaper. Currently, Rezwana Siddiqui is the responsible editor of the newspaper.

=== Relaunch ===
Dinkal resumed to application on 1 September 2024.

== Announcement of closure ==
On December 26, 2022, the office of Dainik Dinkal was ordered to be invalidated by the publication branch of the Dhaka District Magistrate. According to the office order, without assigning responsibility to the newspaper publisher, the office address and printing press were relocated outside the country, and the newspaper was prosecuted in a criminal case. Tarek Rahman's name was used to issue a press release for printing the newspaper, and the address and printing press were changed without the permission of the authorities. As a result, the announcement of the newspaper's publication was suspended. On February 19, 2023, the Bangladesh Press Council announced the closure of the publication of the newspaper.

== Reaction to publication closure ==
- On February 20, 2023, Bangladesh Federal Union of Journalists (BFUJ) and Dhaka Union of Journalists (DUJ) staged a protest against the banning of publication of daily Dinkal. Besides, BNP Secretary General Mirza Fakhrul Islam Alamgir strongly condemned the closure of the newspaper in a statement.
- On February 20, 2023, Stephen Dujarric, spokesman for UN Secretary-General Antonio Guterres, expressed concern at the regular briefing of the United Nations.
- On February 21, 2023, the Committee to Protect Journalists issued a statement on its website calling for the closure of the daily Dinkal citing "a violation of democratic principles".
- On February 24, 2023, a total of 9 countries, including the United States, the United Kingdom, and the Media Freedom Coalition (MFC) based in Bangladesh expressed concern over the cancellation of publication and printing approval.
- On 26 February 2023, the Dhaka Journalist Union (DUJ) organized a rally to protest against the cancellation of the declaration. A section of Bangladesh Federal Union of Journalists (BFUJ) participated in it.
