= Sheikh Rehana =

Bangladeshi politician (born 1955)

Sheikh Rehana Siddiq
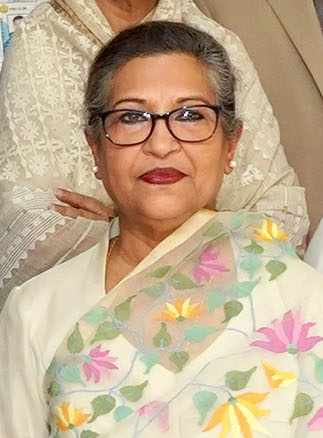
- Rehana in 2024
- Born: 13 September 1955 (age 70); Tungipara, East Bengal, Pakistan
- Citizenship: Bangladesh; United Kingdom
- Political party: Bangladesh Awami League
- Spouse: Shafique Ahmed Siddique (m. 1977)
- Children: Tulip Rizwana Siddiq; Radwan Mujib Siddiq Bobby; Azmina Siddiq Rupanti
- Parents: Sheikh Mujibur Rahman (father); Sheikh Fazilatunnesa Mujib (mother)
- Relatives: See Tungipara Sheikh family

Sheikh Rehana Siddiq (born 13 September 1955) is a Bangladeshi Awami League politician. She is the younger sister of the former Prime Minister Sheikh Hasina and the daughter of the first President of Bangladesh Sheikh Mujibur Rahman. She is also the mother of Tulip Siddiq, a British Labour Party politician and former Economic Secretary to the Treasury. She is currently facing multiple corruption cases in Bangladesh.

== Early life ==
Rehana was 4th child of Sheikh Mujibur Rahman, the first president of Bangladesh, and Sheikh Fazilatunnesa Mujib, a housewife. She was placed under house arrest in Dhanmondi along with her family by the Pakistan Army during Bangladesh Liberation War. She passed matriculation examination from Shaheen School. She was in West Germany with her elder sister Sheikh Hasina when her family was assassinated in a military coup by the Bangladesh Army on 15 August 1975. She was 20 years old at that time.

== Career ==
After the assassination of Sheikh Mujibur Rahman, Rehana and her elder sister Sheikh Hasina took political refuge in India first and later to the United Kingdom. She had played an instrumental role in raising international awareness on the brutal and unlawful assassination of her entire family. After relentless campaign in different European countries, in the year 1979 in Sweden, Sheikh Rehana held the first international conference to call for an impartial trial on Bangabandhu Murder. The conference was attended by international jurists, European civil society members and her political colleagues in exile. During her exile in the UK in 1980s, Sheikh Rehana assisted Bangladesh Awami League (BAL) to reach out to European Civil Society and UN Organizations on the plight of Bangladeshi people under undemocratic and brutal military dictatorship it had witnessed from 1975 to 1991.

Between the year 2007-08, while Sheikh Hasina was imprisoned under the emergency rule of Fakhruddin Ahmed’s military backed caretaker government, Sheikh Rehana on Hasina's behalf secretly organised Awami League and other political parties to bring back democratic elected government in Dhaka. Sheikh Rehana was made councilor of BAL Dhaka South unit in 2016.

== Controversy ==
After Sheikh Hasina's fall, the Anti-Corruption Commission of Bangladesh has started investigations of various corruption and abuse of power cases against her. The BFIU and ACC has sought financial information from banks about her. These include a $5 billion embezzlement case of Rooppur Nuclear Power Plant, allocations of RAJUK plots in Purbanchal by abuse of power and money laundering. It has also been reported that she is linked to the siphoning of billions of dollars from Bangladesh's banking system through S. Alam. Law adviser to the Interim Government of Bangladesh Asif Nazrul stated on December 9, 2024 that "Younger sister Sheikh Rehana was Sheikh Hasina's cashier" in context of money laundering and corruption.

In December 2025, she was sentenced to 7 years in jail for the Purbachal scam cases.

== Residence and security ==
She was allotted a government house/plot in Dhanmondi for a "Token" 100 taka in 2001 by the government of Bangladesh. Bangladesh government has a policy and law to allot government plots to prominent personalities, and as such this allotment was made to her considering her position as the country's father of the nation's daughter and the resulting security threat to her and her family members. Government has allotted such lands to many prominent political, social and cultural personalities in the past and still continues to do so. The first allocation was cancelled when Bangladesh Nationalist Party came to power. Later the decision to award the allotment was upheld in the High Court of Bangladesh following a Writ Petition filed by Sheikh Rehana. But a change of heart saw her return the house to the government despite obtaining High Court order in her favour.

In 2014 she was allocated a house in Gulshan after Awami League came to power for a token price of 1001 taka following the High Court order which upheld the legality of her prior allotment. Given the violent history of brutal assassination of Sheikh Mujib family in 1975, and later attempts to assassinate Sheikh Hasina, which was 19 times in total, and very high security risk towards the immediate Mujib family members, in 2015 she and her children were given lifelong protection by the government of Bangladesh through the Special Security Force. Practice of extending such security protection is not rare for persons with high security risk to their lives. The government also announced free utility for life for her and her family. After the fall of the Awami League government, her residence in Gulshan was vandalized. However, the interim government decided to cancel this law. On 29 August 2024, the interim government decided to cancel this law. Then on September 9, 2024, an ordinance was issued repealing the law.

In April 2025, the Anti-Corruption Commission seized Rehana's properties along with her family members after filing a successful petition with Dhaka Metropolitan Senior Special Judge Md Zakir Hossain.

== Personal life ==
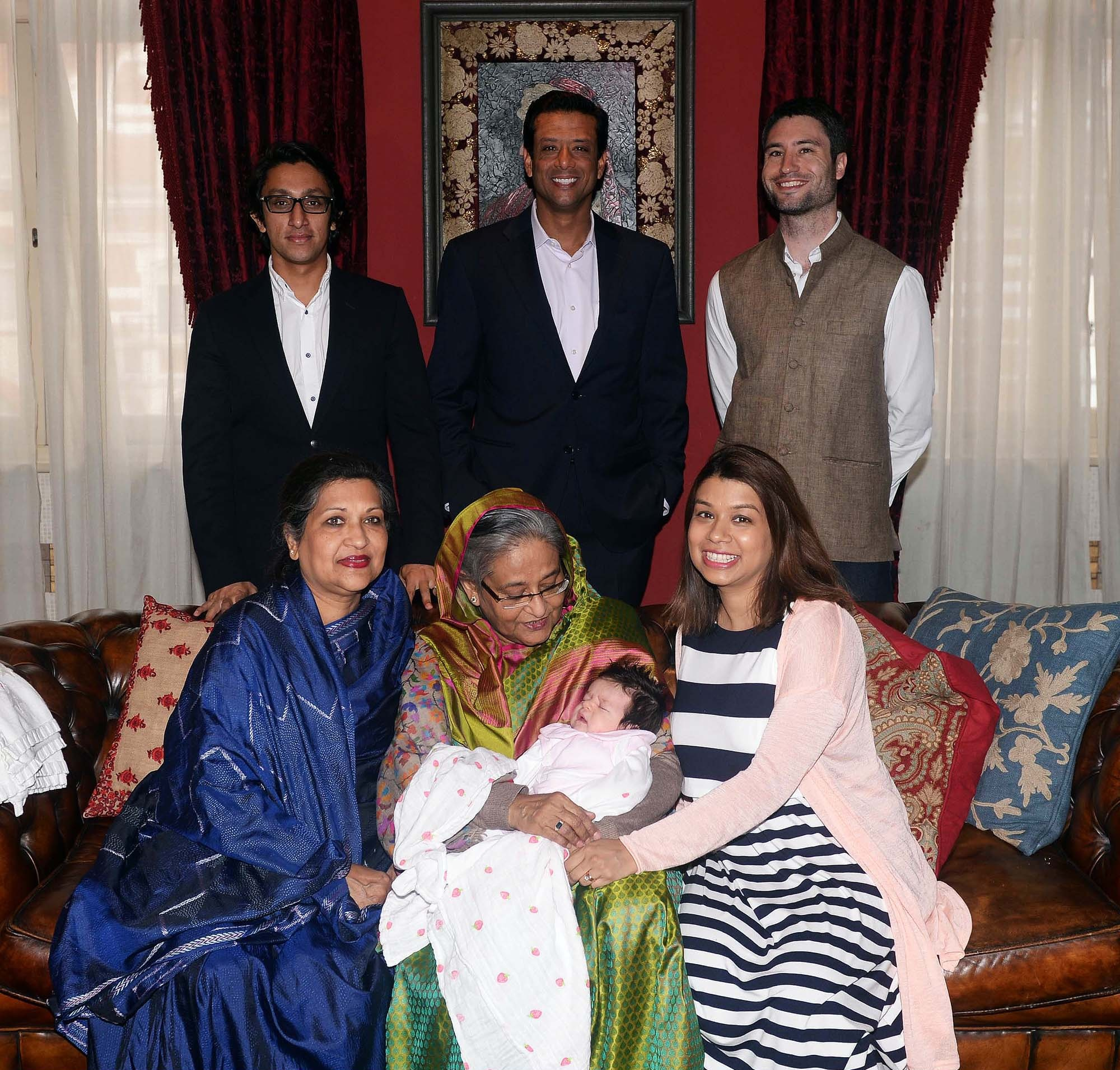
Rehana, her daughter Tulip Siddiq and son Radwan Mujib Siddiq Bobby with sister, the ousted Prime Minister of Bangladesh Sheikh Hasina and nephew Sajeeb Wazed Joy in 2016 in London.

Rehana is married to Shafique Ahmed Siddique, retired professor of Department of Accounting & Information Systems, Faculty of Business Studies (FBS), University of Dhaka. Her son, Radwan Mujib Siddiq Bobby, is a councilor of Bangladesh Awami League. Her daughter, Tulip Siddiq, is a Member of Parliament for the Labour Party in the United Kingdom House of Commons for the Hampstead and Kilburn constituency, her other daughter is Azmina Siddiq.

Rehana often accompanied Sheikh Hasina on her official trips including the state funeral of Elizabeth II, Queen of the United Kingdom in 2022 and Coronation of Charles III and Camilla in 2023. She also accompanied Hasina after she resigned as Prime Minister and fled Bangladesh to India during the Non-cooperation movement (2024) on 5 August.
