= Tarique Ahmed Siddique =

Bangladeshi Army officer

Tarique Siddique
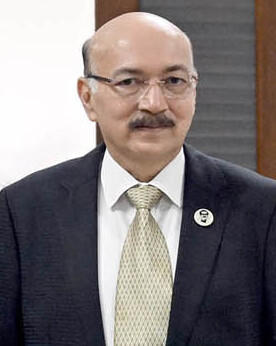
- Tarique in 2023

Defence and Security Adviser to the Prime Minister of Bangladesh
- In office 25 January 2009 – 5 August 2024
- Prime Minister: Sheikh Hasina
- Preceded by: Office established
- Succeeded by: Khalilur Rahman (as National Security Adviser)

Military service
- Allegiance: Bangladesh
- Branch/service: Bangladesh Army; Bangladesh Ansar; Bangladesh Rifles
- Years of service: 1975–2004
- Rank: Major General
- Unit: Corps of Engineers
- Commands: Engineer-in-Chief of Army Headquarters; Deputy Director General of Directorate General of Forces Intelligence; Commander of 14th Independent Engineers Brigade

Tarique Ahmed Siddique is a retired major general of the Bangladesh Army and the former defence and security adviser to Prime Minister Sheikh Hasina.

== Personal life ==
Tarique Ahmed Siddique is the younger brother of Shafique Ahmed Siddique, the husband of Sheikh Rehana, the only surviving sister of Bangladeshi former prime minister Sheikh Hasina.

== Career ==
Siddique was commissioned in the Corps of Engineers on 11 January 1975. He served as platoon leader and company 2 i/c in the Savar Engineering Brigade until 1976, when he was promoted to lieutenant. Promoted to captain in 1979, he served as GSO-3 (Engrs) of Rangpur Cantonment and company commander in Bandarban. He was promoted to major in 1983. He served as an adjutant of an engineers battalion in Alikadam till 1985 and as commander of a Bangladesh Rifles battalion in Satkhira till 1987. He completed the Armed Forces War Course in 1984 and Staff College in India in 1987. Thereafter he served as brigade major of the 21st Infantry Brigade in Jessore until 1989. He served in the DGFI from 1989, where he was promoted to lieutenant colonel in 1990. He was removed from DGFI in 1991. From 1991 to 1993, he served as directing staff in the National Defence College, and from 1993 to 1995, he served as staff officer in Bangladesh Ansar headquarters, when he went on UN Deputation to Zaire. From 1995 to 1996, he served as deputy chief instructor in the Engineer Centre and the School of Military Engineering (ECSME). He was promoted to colonel in 1996 and served for a time as commanding officer of the 9 Engrs Battalion in Savar, and thereafter in the Directorate General of Forces Intelligence until 1998, after which he was assigned to the Special Security Force.

He was promoted to brigadier in 1999. From 2000 to 2001, he served as deputy commander of the 9th Infantry Division. From 17 November 2001 to 17 March 2002, he served as the engineer in chief of the Bangladesh Army. He was promoted to major general in 2003 and served as senior instructor (army) in the Defense Services Command and Staff College (DSCSC) Mirpur.

After retirement from active service, he was appointed as chief of personal security to Sheikh Hasina when she was the opposition leader. He was present during the 2004 Dhaka grenade attack, which tried to assassinate Sheikh Hasina. He was appointed to the post of adviser to the prime minister in 2009. He advised her on anti-terrorism activities. He inaugurated the Disaster Response Exercise and Exchange in 2016. He is a graduate of Defence Services Command & Staff College, Bangladesh. He has done the RCDS course at the Royal College of Defence Studies London, United Kingdom.

== Controversies ==
During his role as the security advisor of Prime Minister Sheikh Hasina, Siddique has been accused of extrajudicial killings, enforced disappearances, and financial scandals.

Allegations of abductions and enforced disappearances

Siddique was accused of abducting Tauhidul Islam Chowdhury, chief of the personal security team of BNP chairperson Begum Khaleda Zia, in 2018, and a case has been filed against him for abduction and illegal detention in 2024. He was also held accountable for his alleged connections to the BDR carnage, and a lawsuit is underway regarding this on behalf of a victim's family. Moreover, due to his controversial role during the 2024 Bangladesh quota reform movement, a murder case has been filed against him with the Ashulia Police Station of Dhaka.

In 2011, Siddique defended the Rapid Action Battalion's widely controversial action of shooting a college student named Limon Hossain. Limon, who was shot by RAB and subsequently lost his left leg, filed a complaint with the International Crimes Tribunal in 2024 accusing Tarique Siddique along with eight other individuals who are mostly former RAB personnel.

In 2012, a report by Salah Choudhury published in openDemocracy raised allegations that Colonel Shahid Uddin Khan was engaged in influence peddling and corrupt practices with the backing of Siddique. According to the report, Khan has a number of businesses in which Siddique's wife and daughter are shareholders. According to an Al Jazeera Investigative Unit report, published on 29 March 2019, Siddique used intelligence agencies to abduct employees of a business associate. The business associate, Colonel Shahid Uddin Khan, is currently in exile in the United Kingdom. The family members of men have not heard from them since their abduction. As defence advisor, he had control over the intelligence agencies and military of Bangladesh.

It is alleged that Tarique Ahmed Siddique was one of the masterminds of the formation of the 'Aynaghar', an arbitrary detention and torture cell of the Awami League government.

Corruption and financial misconduct

Tarique Siddique has been accused of embezzling billions of Bangladeshi Taka (BDT) through commission-based deals from various government projects.

In April 2012, Tarique Ahmed Siddique was implicated in a corruption scandal involving the Bangladesh Railway. A vehicle carrying Tk 70 lakh in bribe money was intercepted at the Pilkhana BGB headquarters. Siddique, acting on behalf of Prime Minister Sheikh Hasina, ordered the release of the detained individuals and the return of the money, while ensuring the incident was kept from the public. Siddique and the director general of defence procurement are allegedly responsible for embezzling $76.4 million from a contract to supply second-hand helicopters to the Bangladesh Army.

Freezing of assets

After the fall of the Sheikh Hasina regime, the Bangladesh Financial Intelligence Unit (BFIU) ordered a freeze on the bank accounts of Tarique Siddique, his family members, and their associated entities under the Money Laundering Act in 2024. The freeze came amid investigations into his alleged role in laundering public funds and illegal financial transactions. The directive extended to the suspension of personal and corporate accounts, as well as locker access, underscoring the severity of the accusations.
