= Fareast International University =

Private university in Bangladesh

Fareast International University (FIU)
- Motto: "Start Here Succeed Here"
- Type: Private
- Established: 2013; 13 years ago
- Affiliations: University Grants Commission Bangladesh
- Chairman: Sheikh Kabir Hossain
- Chancellor: President Mohammed Shahabuddin
- Vice-Chancellor: Raquib Ahmed
- Location: House # 87, Road # 06, Block-C, Banani, Dhaka, 1213, Bangladesh; 23.792044°N 90.402846°E
- Website: www.fiu.edu.bd

Fareast International University (FIU) (Bengali: ফারইস্ট ইন্টারন্যাশনাল ইউনিভার্সিটি) is a private university located at Banani in Dhaka, Bangladesh. The university was established in 2013 under the Private University Act, 2010. It was founded by Sheikh Kabir Hossain, a relative of Prime Minister Sheikh Hasina.

FIU is currently operating trimester basis in 16 graduate and masters programs under the faculty of Business Administration, Engineering, Science, Liberal Arts & Social Sciences and LAW. FIU introduces international standard course curricula approved by the UGC of Bangladesh. Besides, there are different clubs and houses for debate, English language, indoor-games, cultural practices, and sports facilities for the benefit of the learners. It has research and academic collaborations with number of foreign universities.

FIU is the first private university in Bangladesh selected by the Government to offer MBA Major in Project Monitoring and Evaluation. Moreover, FIU has established "Integrated Research Institute for Inclusive Development (IRIID)" for action research on various issues of the contemporary world and appropriate technology transfer for sustainable development.

== Faculties/Department ==
- Faculty of Business Administration
  - Department of Business Administration
  - Department of Tourism & Hospitality Management
- Faculty of Engineering
  - Department of Electrical & Electronic Engineering (EEE)
  - Department of Computer Science & Engineering (CSE)
  - Department of Civil & Environmental Engineering (CEE)
  - Department of Textile Engineering
  - Department of Architecture
- Faculty of Science
  - Department of Physics
  - Department of Chemistry
  - Department of Mathematics
  - Department of Soil, Water & Environment (SWE)
  - Department of Public Health
- Faculty of Liberal Arts & Social Sciences
  - Department of English
  - Department of Islamic Studies
- Faculty of Law
  - Department of Law & Justice

== Infrastructure ==
Administrative functionaries are accountable to the trustee board and the management in discharging their responsibilities.

It has a library with textbooks and reference items, and laboratories for basic sciences, computing and engineering practical experiments. FIU has purchased 1.14 acres of land in the RAJUK Uttara 3rd Phase Land Development Project in Sector 16 for its permanent campus.
