= Sheikh Lutfar Rahman =

Bangladeshi court officer (1881–1975)

- শেখ লুৎফর রহমান
- Sheikh Lutfar Rahman with his son Sheikh Mujibur Rahman
- Born: 1881; Tungipara, Bengal, British India
- Died: 30 March 1975 (aged 94); Dacca, Bangladesh
- Resting place: Mausoleum of Sheikh Mujibur Rahman
- Occupation: Court officer
- Known for: Being the father of Sheikh Mujibur Rahman
- Spouse: Sheikh Sayera Khatun
- Children: 6, including: Sheikh Mujibur Rahman; Sheikh Abu Naser
- Family: Tungipara Sheikh family

Sheikh Lutfur Rahman (Bengali: শেখ লুৎফর রহমান; 1881 – 30 March 1975) was a Bangladeshi serestadar, an officer responsible for record-keeping at the Gopalganj civil court in British India. His son Sheikh Mujibur Rahman was the first president of Bangladesh. Lutfar was also the paternal grandfather of Sheikh Hasina.

== Early life ==
Rahman was born in 1881 to the Bengali Muslim into the Sheikh family of Tungipara village in Gopalganj, Faridpur district, Bengal Presidency.

Lutfar Rahman was married to his paternal first-cousin Sayera Khatun, the daughter of his father's brother Sheikh Abdul Majid. He left home to find a job and worked in the Dewani court, today Gopalganj civil court.

== 1971 Liberation War ==
During the Bangladesh Liberation War, Lutfar Rahman and his wife Sheikh Sayera Khatun, along with the family of Sheikh Mujibur Rahman were put under arrest by the Pakistan Army. Initially, Lutfar Rahman and his wife were in Khulna at their younger son Naser's house in Khulna, but was later sent away to their ancestral home in Gopalganj. On 8 April 1971, the Pakistan Army looted ornaments and other valuables from the house and later bulldozed and set fire to it. The soldiers also shot dead four relatives and two servants of the household. The elderly couple were rendered homeless until the local Awami League activists built them a temporary shed which was also destroyed by the Pakistan Army after 20 days. They were then sent away to Dhaka where they were put under arrest with their elder son's family.

== Death and legacy ==
Rahman died on 30 March 1975. He was buried in Tungipara, Gopalganj district, Bangladesh. Sheikh Lutfar Rahman Bridge over Madhumati River connecting Gopalganj-Pirojpur Highway. The foundation stone of the bridge was laid on 23 December 2000 by Sheikh Hasina. The construction was stopped in 2001 by the 4-party government. The construction work resumed in 2009 when Bangladesh Awami League returned to power in 2009. The bridge was inaugurated in January 2015 by Sheikh Hasina. Sheikh Lutfar Rahman Adarsha Government College is a government college in Kotalipara, Gopalganj.

== Popular culture ==
Actor Chanchal Chowdhury portrayed Rahman in the biopic Mujib: The Making of a Nation (2023), directed by Shyam Benegal.
