= Mockbul Hossain =

Bangladeshi politician (c.1950–2020)

- মকবুল হোসেন

Member of the Bangladesh Parliament for Dhaka-9
- In office 14 July 1996 – 13 July 2001
- Preceded by: Muhammad Jamiruddin Sircar
- Succeeded by: Khandokar Mahbub Uddin Ahmad

Personal details
- Born: 1950 Munshiganj, Bangladesh.
- Died: 24 May 2020 (aged 70) Dhaka, Bangladesh.
- Cause of death: COVID-19
- Citizenship: Bangladeshi
- Party: Bangladesh Awami League
- Education: University of Dhaka

Mockbul Hossain (c. 1950 – 24 May 2020) was a Bangladeshi Businessman and Politician. He served as a Member of Parliament representing the Dhaka-9 constituency. He was Advisory Council Member of Bangladesh Awami League. And also Founding Convener of Bangladesh Awami Swechasebak League serving with Bahauddin Nasim.

== Early life and education ==
Hossain was born c. 1950 in Bikrampur. He earned his MA and LLB degrees from the University of Dhaka.

== Career ==
Mockbul Hossain was a Member of Advisory Council of Bangladesh Awami League. He was elected to parliament from Dhaka-9 as a Bangladesh Awami League candidate in June 1996.. He was also Founding Convener of Bangladesh Awami Swechasebak League, Bahauddin Nasim was Founding Join Converner with him.

== Awards ==
- Bangladesh Development Sangsad Gold Medal Award

== Personal life and death ==
Hossain died while undergoing treatment for COVID-19 at Combined Military Hospital on 24 May 2020 during the COVID-19 pandemic in Bangladesh.
