= Balakoir Beel =

Tourist Area in Dhaka Bangladesh

- বলাকইড় বিলে (Bengali)
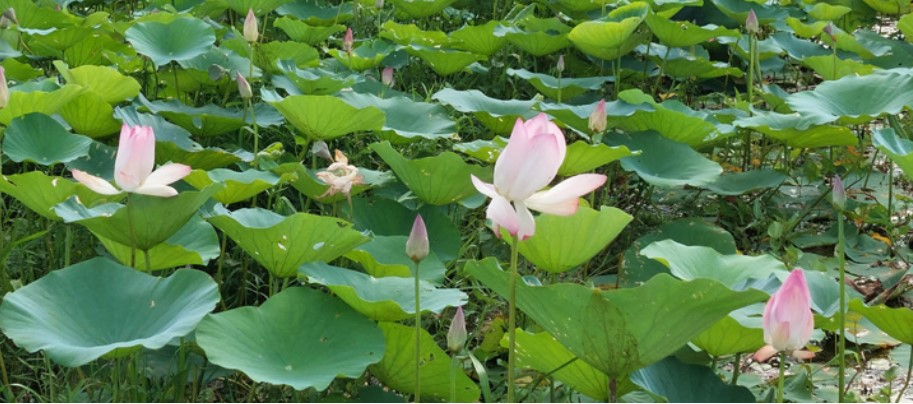
- Lotus flowers on the beel
- Location: Gopalganj Sadar Upazila, Bangladesh
- Basin countries: Bangladesh
- Settlements: Balakoir

Balakoir Beel is a wetland in Balakoir, Karpara Union under Gopalganj Sadar Upazila in Gopalganj District, Bangladesh. It is one of the many "Padma Beel" tourist attractions in the country, so called because in the rainy season the beel is carpeted with lotus flowers (padma). Local boatmen can be hired to take visitors on a tour of the beel. The flowers hold cultural and religious significance in the region. Locals make a profit picking them.

== Location ==
The distance from the district headquarters of Gopalganj by road is approximately 16 kilometers to the northeast. To the east lies Bil Bajunia, to the west is Bangram, to the north is Krishnapur, and to the south are the areas of Manikhar, Bhojergati, and Kathi.
