= Nurul Haque (Dhaka politician) =

Bangladeshi politician

Member of Bangladesh Parliament
- In office 1979–1982
- Preceded by: Rafiq Uddin Ahmed
- Succeeded by: Mahmudul Hasan

Personal details
- Political party: Bangladesh Nationalist Party

Nurul Haque is a Bangladesh Nationalist Party politician and a former member of parliament for Dhaka-9.

== Career ==
Haque was elected to parliament from Dhaka-9 as a Bangladesh Nationalist Party candidate in 1979 and served in the 2nd Jatiya Sangsad.
