= Nirmal Sen =

Bangladeshi journalist and politician

Nirmal Kumar Sen Gupta
- নির্মল কুমার সেন গুপ্ত
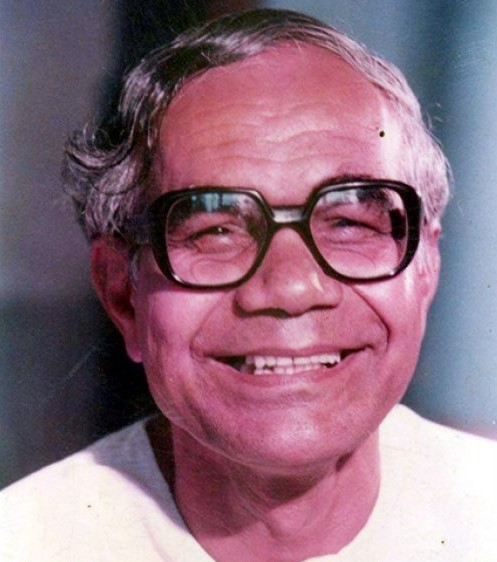
- Born: 3 August 1930; Kotalipara Upazila, Gopalganj District, Bengal Presidency, British Raj
- Died: 8 January 2013 (aged 82); Gopalganj, Bangladesh
- Citizenship: British India (until 1947); Pakistan (until 1971); Bangladesh
- Education: University of Dhaka
- Employer(s): The Daily Ittefaq; Dainik Bangla
- Known for: President of Dhaka Union of Journalists and Bangladesh Federal Union of Journalists
- Political party: Workers Peasants Socialist Party
- Other political affiliations: Revolutionary Socialist Party (India); Gonotantrik Biplobi Party

Nirmal Kumar Sen Gupta (Bengali: নির্মল কুমার সেন গুপ্ত; 3 August 1930 – 8 January 2013), commonly known as Nirmal Sen, was a Bangladeshi journalist and politician.

== Early life ==
Sen was born on 3 August 1930 in Dighirpar village, Kotalipara Upazila, Gopalganj District, East Bengal, British India. In 1942, he became active in student politics while in grade nine. He graduated from Barisal BM College. He did his undergraduate and master's from the University of Dhaka. He was a member of the Revolutionary Socialist Party in Kolkata.

== Career ==
Sen joined Dainik Jehad in 1956. He also worked at The Daily Ittefaq, Dainik Pakistan (later renamed Dainik Bangla).

From 1971 to 1972, Sen was the President of Dhaka Union of Journalists. From 1972 to 1978, Sen was the president of Bangladesh Federal Union of Journalists. He was a member of the Jatiya Press Club.

In the 1980s, Sen led the Sramik Krishak Samajbadi Dal, a left wing political party,

Sen was the President of Gonotantrik Biplobi Party.

The Bangladesh Federal Union of Journalists and Dhaka Union of Journalists demanded the government send Sen abroad for medical treatment on 27 October 2003 after he had suffered stroke and was admitted to Bangabandhu Sheikh Mujib Medical University. Tariqul Islam, Minister of Information, and Abdul Mannan Bhuiyan, Minister of Local Government, Rural Development and Co-operatives, visited him in the hospital. He was sent to Mount Elizabeth Hospital in Singapore for treatment. The Minister of Foreign Affairs, M Morshed Khan, and the ambassador of Bangladesh to Singapore, Munshi Faiz Ahmed, visited him at the hospital.

In February 2004, Sen's Sramik Krishak Samajbadi Dal met with Awami League to talk about forming a coalition. He was active in the National Committee for Protection of Power-Port and Oil-Gas Resources.

Sen presided over a meeting of the Left Democratic Front on 26 December 2005, which called on the government to provided subsidized fertilizer to farmers.

Sen chaired a meeting of the Left Democratic Front in June 2006 which called for the resignation of the Election Commissioners of Bangladesh Election Commission.

== Death ==
Sen was paralyzed after a stroke in 2011. He was suffering from pneumonia before his death. Sen died on 8 January 2013 in LabAid Hospital, Dhaka, Bangladesh. He body was donated for research per his wish. Comrade Nirmal Sen Memorial National Committee organizes events in his memory. Journalist Nirmal Sen Auditorium was named after him in Dhaka.
