= Khandokar Shams Uddin Ahmed =

Bangladeshi lawyer and politician

Khandakar Shamsuddin Ahmed

Member of the East Bengal Legislative Assembly
- In office 1947–1954
- Constituency: Gopalganj

Member of the Bengal Legislative Assembly
- In office 1937–1947
- Constituency: Gopalganj

Personal details
- Born: 1892 North Gopinathpur, Gopalganj, Faridpur district, Bengal Presidency
- Died: February 26, 1981 (aged 88–89) Purana Paltan, Dhaka, Bangladesh
- Political party: Krishak Sramik Party
- Children: Khandokar Mahbub Uddin Ahmad

Khandkar Shamsuddin Ahmed (Bengali: খন্দকার শামসুদ্দীন আহাম্মদ; 1892 - 26 February 1981) was a Bangladeshi lawyer and politician. He is a former MLA of the Bengal Legislative Assembly.

== Early life ==
Ahmed was born in 1892 to a Bengali family of Muslim Khandkars in North Gopinathpur, Gopalganj, Faridpur district, Bengal Presidency (now Bangladesh). His father, Khandkar Ahmad Uddin, died when he was three years old and so he studied whilst living with his paternal uncle, eventually achieving Bachelor of Arts and Bachelor of Laws degrees. His mother, Saiyadunnesa Khatun, was the daughter of Munshi Ahmad Kamel Miah, the zamindar of Bahara in Gopalganj.

== Career ==
Khandaker Shamsuddin Ahmad practiced law in Gopalganj. During that time, he was elected as a member of the Faridpur District Board for thirty years and served as the president of the Faridpur District School Board for five years. After the 1937 Bengal Legislative Assembly election, he was elected to the Gopalganj constituency as a member of the Bengal Legislative Assembly and was re-elected to the same position at the 1946 Bengal Legislative Assembly election, serving for eighteen consecutive years.

Ahmed was a politician of the Krishak Sramik Party of Sher-e-Bangla Abul Kasem Fazlul Haque. He later joined the All-India Muslim League after Sher-e-Bangla joined the league. He was friends with Sheikh Lutfar Rahman, father of Sheikh Mujibur Rahman. Ahmed was a member of the treasury Bench of East Bengal Legislative Assembly. He asked Nurul Amin to visit students injured in the Bengali Language movement.

== Death and legacy ==
Ahmed died of old age on 26 February 1981 in Purana Paltan, Dhaka, Bangladesh. He was buried in Banani graveyard. His son, Khandokar Mahbub Uddin Ahmad, was a member of parliament from Dhaka. The Khondker Shams Uddin Smrity High School is named after him.
