= Rupahati =

Rupahati রূপাহাটি
- Interactive map of Rupahati

Population
  - Total: 990

Rupahati is a village in Gopalganj, Bangladesh. As of the 2011 Census it has an population of 990 and 206 households.
