= Comilla University =

Public university located at Kotbari, Comilla, Bangladesh

Coordinates: 23.418°N 91.135°E

- কুমিল্লা বিশ্ববিদ্যালয়
- Motto: শিক্ষাই শক্তি
- Motto in English: Education is power
- Type: Public university
- Established: 2006; 20 years ago
- Accreditation: UGC; PCB
- Chancellor: President Hafiz Uddin Ahmad
- Vice-Chancellor: Dr. M M Shariful Karim
- Academic staff: 270
- Students: 6,900 (According to CoU official website)
- Location: Comilla, 3506, Bangladesh
- Campus: 244.19 acres (98.82 ha) (50 acres in Salmanpur & 194.19 acres in Rajarkhola) Kotbari, Comilla; Rural
- Language: English; Bengali
- Website: cou.ac.bd

Comilla University is a public university located at Kotbari, Comilla, Bangladesh. The university was constructed on 244.19 acres of land at Shalban Vihara, Moynamoti, Kotbari. Comilla University is affiliated with University Grants Commission, Bangladesh.

Golam Mowlah is the founder vice-chancellor of Comilla University who served until he was removed on 30 July 2008. Zulfikar Ali, a professor of mathematics, was given the charge as acting vice-chancellor. The next vice-chancellor of Comilla University, A.K.M. Zehadul Karim declared his resignation on 7 October 2009. Amir Hossen Khan, a professor of the physics department of Jahangirnagar University, was appointed as vice-chancellor on 22 November 2009. After expiration of the duration of Amir Hossen Khan then Ali Ashraf, a professor of the economics department and ex-president of Chittagong University Teachers Association has been appointed as the 5th vice-chancellor of Comilla University. He joined the university on 3 December 2013. Emran Kabir Chowdhury, on 31 January 2018, joined as the 6th vice chancellor of Comilla University.

It started with 7 functional departments. Now there are a total of 19 departments Under 6 faculties including Information & Communication Technology, Computer Science & Engineering, Pharmacy, Physics, Chemistry, Statistics, Mathematics, Finance and Banking, Accounting & Information Systems, Marketing, Management Studies, Mass Communication & Journalism, Law, Economics, Public Administration, Archeology, Anthropology, Bengali, and English.

== History ==
The executive committee of the National Economic Council (ECNEC) approved a project for the establishment of twelve science and technology universities in the country during 2001 and one of these was planned to be established in Comilla. But instead, the government granted a general university and its charter in Comilla on 8 May 2006, as the 26th public university under which the university is being operated.

The university formally started its journey on 28 May 2007, through an orientation program for the 2006–07 academic year with 300 students and 15 teachers enrolled in 7 departments under 4 faculties:

- Department of Mathematics under the Faculty of Science,
- Department of English under the Faculty of Arts & Humanities,
- Department of Economics and Public Administration under the Faculty of Social Science,
- Three departments (Accounting & Information Systems, Management, Marketing) under the School of Business.

The Department of Computer Science & Engineering (CSE) was introduced in the 2008–09 session. The Department of Bangla, Department of Anthropology and the Department of Information and Communication Technology (ICT) was introduced in the 2009–2010 session. Three new departments (Physics, Chemistry and Statistics) have been opened in the academic session 2010–2011. From the academic session 2013–14 three more department (Finance and Banking, Pharmacy and Archeology) have been introduced. Comilla University has more than four thousand students in different batches, 120 teachers and 100 staffs devoted to conducting teaching and research.

== Administration ==
Vice-chancellors

1. Golam Mowlah (26 July 2006 – 30 July 2008)
2. M. Zulfikar Ali (31 July 2008 – 19 Oct 2008)
3. A. H. M. Zehadul Karim (20 Oct 2008 – 22 Nov 2009)
4. Md. Amir Hossen Khan (23 Nov 2009 – 22 Nov 2013)
5. Md. All Ashraf ( 3 Dec 2013 – 2 Dec 2017)
6. Emran Kabir Chowdhury (31 Jan 2018 – 30 Jan 2022)
7. A. F. M. Abdul Moyeen (31 Jan 2022 – 11 August 2024)
8. Md. Haider Ali
9. Dr. M M Shariful Karim

At the aftermath of non-cooperation movement, on 11 August 2024, Vice-Chancellor Abdul Moyeen, Proctor (acting) Kazi Omar Saddiqi and three assistant proctors: Md Jahid Hasan, Amit Dutta, and Abu Obaida Rahid, resigned from their posts.

== Academics ==
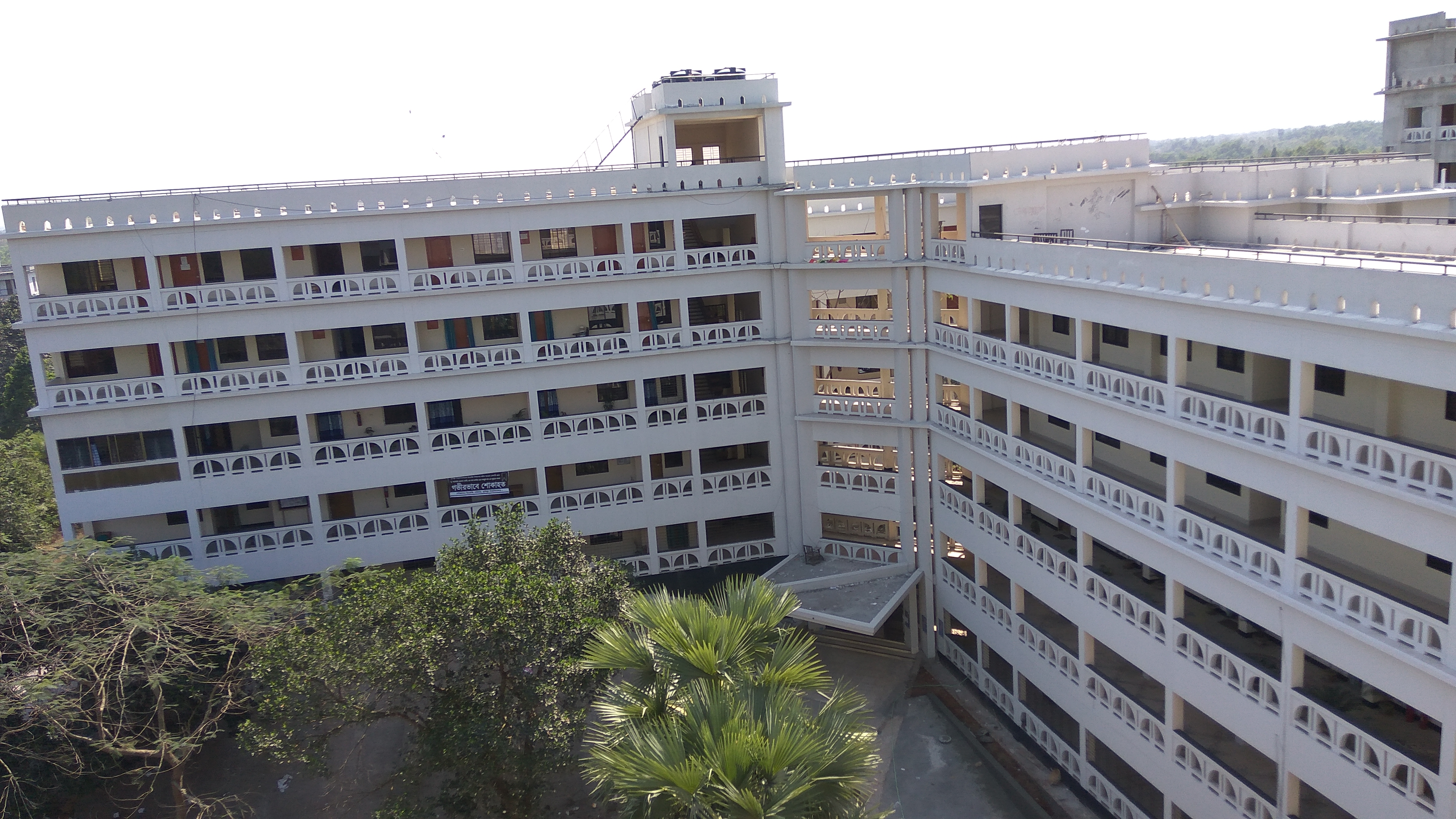
Comilla University Academic Building (South)

=== Faculties and departments ===
The university's 19 departments are organised into 6 faculties.

Faculty	Department	Seat
Faculty of Engineering	Computer Science and Engineering	50
Faculty of Engineering	Information and Communication Technology	50
Faculty of Science	Mathematics	60
Faculty of Science	Physics	50
Faculty of Science	Chemistry	50
Faculty of Science	Statistics	50
Faculty of Science	Pharmacy	40
Faculty of Arts Law	Law	50
Faculty of Arts & Humanities	Bangla	60
Faculty of Arts & Humanities	English	60
Faculty of Social Science	Economics	60
Faculty of Social Science	Mass Communication and Journalism	50
Faculty of Social Science	Public Administration	60
Faculty of Social Science	Archaeology	50
Faculty of Social Science	Anthropology	60
Faculty of Business	Management Studies	60
Faculty of Business	Marketing	60
Faculty of Business	Accounting and Information Systems	60
Faculty of Business	Finance and Banking	60

== Academic buildings ==
There are four academic buildings (One is under process) in Comilla University Campus:

1. Academic Building 1 (North) (Faculty of Business Studies)
2. Academic Building 2 (South) (Faculty of Social Science, Arts)
3. Academic Building 3 (Faculty of Science)
4. Academic Building 4 (Faculty of Law and Engineering)

== Residential student halls ==
There are five residential halls. Two for female and three for male students

- Shaheed Dhirendranath Datta Hall
- Kazi Nazrul Islam Hall
- Bijoy 24 Hall
- Nawab Faizunnesa Choudhurani Hall (Female)
- Suniti Shanti Hall (Female)

== See also ==
- List of Educational Institutions in Comilla
