= Chowdhury Nafeez Sarafat =

Bangladeshi businessman

- চৌধুরী নাফিজ সরাফাত
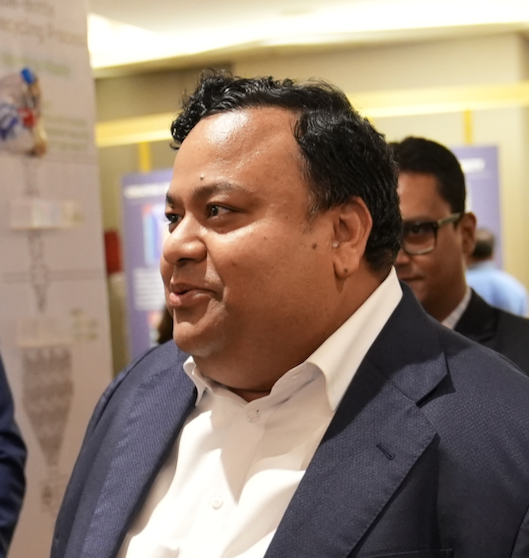
- Nafeez Sarafat at the Embassy of the United States, Dhaka on July 4, 2024.
- Born: Gopalganj District, Dhaka Division, Bangladesh
- Citizenship: Bangladeshi
- Relatives: Chowdhury Jafarullah Sharafat (brother)

Chowdhury Nafeez Sarafat is a Bangladeshi businessman connected to the Awami League government. Sarafat is the founder chairman of the board of trustees of Canadian University of Bangladesh. He was the chairman of Padma Bank PLC.

== Early life ==
Sarafat is from Gopalganj District. His older brother is sports commentator Chowdhury Jafarullah Sharafat.

== Career ==
Sarafat started his career in 1999 at Standard Chartered Bank. He was appointed a director of IFIC Bank and left Standard Chartered Bank after questions were raised about his connections to two banks simultaneously. In 2008, Sarafat joined ICB Islamic Bank as the Head of Consumer Banking. On 15 December 2016, Sarafat received his Doctorate in Business Administration from Commonwealth University-London.

In January 2018, Sarafat was appointed chairman of Farmers Bank Limited, later renamed to Padma Bank, after its chairman Muhiuddin Khan Alamgir resigned over allegations of embezzling from the bank.

Sarafat is the founding chairman of Canadian University of Bangladesh. The university awards Sarafat Chowdhury Merit Scholarship. In October 2021, Benoit Prefontaine, Canadian High Commissioner to Bangladesh, laid the foundation stone for the permanent campus of Canadian University of Bangladesh in Purbachal in a ceremony presided by Sarafat.

In 2022, Sarafat became a director of the National Tea Company Limited. He founded two news organizations, Dainik Bangla and newsbangla24.com.

Sarafat owns RACE Portfolio and Issue Management which was one of the issue manager in the aborted attempt to list Best Holdings Limited whose permission was denied by Bangladesh Bank. Another issue manager, the government owned ICB Capital Management, denied any involvement with the company. He is a director of Unique Hotel and Resorts Limited, which owns Westin Dhaka. He and his wife are directors of Race Financial Management Inc. and Can-Ban Chambers House, based in Canada. He is a major shareholder of RACE Asset Management. He is a member of the executive committee of Bangladesh Association of Banks. He is the Managing Director of Unique Meghnaghat Power Limited, a subsidiary of Unique group. In May 2024, the U.S. Trade and Development Agency (USTDA) awarded a feasibility-study grant to CdNet Communications Limited for the proposed Bagha-1 international submarine cable. USTDA identified Sarafat as a director of CdNet.

== Legal affairs ==
In 2022, he founded Citizen TV with Muhammad Shafiqur Rahman, member of parliament, who later alleged Sarafat and Benazir Ahmed forcefully took shares of the TV from him.

The cartoonist Ahmed Kabir Kishore was arrested under the Digital Security Act for drawing cartoons critical of the government, including one where he portrayed Sarafat as a bank embezzler.

In 2024, ACC starts probe into Nafeez Sarafat over allegations of Padma Bank seizure, Tk800cr embezzlement.

According to an official from the ACC who spoke on condition of anonymity, "Nafeez had seized Padma Bank with the assistance of top officials from the police and an intelligence agency.

A Dhaka court has ordered the Anti-Corruption Commission (ACC) to freeze 74 bank accounts of former Padma Bank chairman Chowdhury Nafeez Sarafat and his family due to allegations of embezzlement totaling Tk 887 crore. The order, issued by Judge Md Zakir Hossain, includes accounts belonging to Nafeez's wife, Anjuman Ara Shahid, and their son, Chowdhury Rahib Safwan Sarafat. The ACC is investigating claims of bribery and corruption against the family. The court also ordered the confiscation of Nafeez's Dubai properties, valued at Tk 10.4 crore, and 22 flats in Dhaka and Gazipur, while a travel ban on Sarafat was imposed on October 7 of the previous year.

== Personal life ==
Sarafat is married to Anjuman Ara Shahid. She served as the chairman of Strategic Finance and Investment Limited and later director of Southeast Bank.
