= Krishna Tithi Khan =

- কৃষ্ণা তিথি খান
- Born: December 13, 1989 (age 36); Gopalganj District, Bangladesh
- Website: www.krishnatithi.com

Krishna Tithi Khan was born on 13 December 1989 in Gopalganj District, Bangladesh. Her father's name is Tapash Kumar Khan and mother's name is Niva Rani Khan. Krishna Tithi is basically a stage singer, also a music artist listed on Bangladesh Betar and Bangladesh Television (BTV). She is a Bangladeshi expatriate singer who received the honor of the "New York State Assembly", "State Senate", "City Council" in 2016.

== Career ==
She started practicing singing in her childhood through her father. From 2000 to 2006, he practiced music from Chayanat and National Nazrul Academy. She became an enlisted singer of Bangladesh Television and Bangladesh Radio in 2004.

== Award ==
- 1st-Champion – Channel I Sherader Moha Juddho – 2009
