= A. F. M. Abdul Moyeen =

Bangladeshi educationalist

Vice Chancellor

Comilla University
- In office 31 January 2022 – 19 August 2024
- Preceded by: Emran Kabir Chowdhury

Personal details
- Born: 1964 (age 61–62) Gopalganj, East Pakistan, Pakistan
- Education: University of Stirling
- Occupation: Academic, university administrator

A. F. M. Abdul Moyeen (born in 1964) is a Bangladeshi educationalist. He is a professor in the Department of Management at the University of Dhaka and a former vice-chancellor of Comilla University during 2022–2024.

== Early life and education ==
Moyeen was born in 1964 in Kotalipara, Gopalganj.

Moyeen passed his secondary examination from Barisal Zilla School and his higher secondary examination from Brojomohun College, Barishal. He received his B.Com. degree in 1984 and M.Com. degree in 1985 from the Department of Management of Dhaka University. He holds a PhD in strategic management from the University of Stirling in Scotland, and completed post-doctoral research at the Australian National University.

== Career ==
Moyeen has 33 years of teaching experience across two institutions: the University of Dhaka and Federation University Australia. He also worked as a post-doctoral fellow at the Australian National University. In addition, he has experience working with various international organizations.

Moyeen was appointed vice-chancellor of Comilla University on 31 January 2022. He resigned from the position on 11 August 2024.

== Publications ==
Moyeen published research articles in national and international journals.
