= Saber Hossain Chowdhury =

Bangladeshi politician

Saber Hossain Chowdhury OF
- সাবের হোসেন চৌধুরী
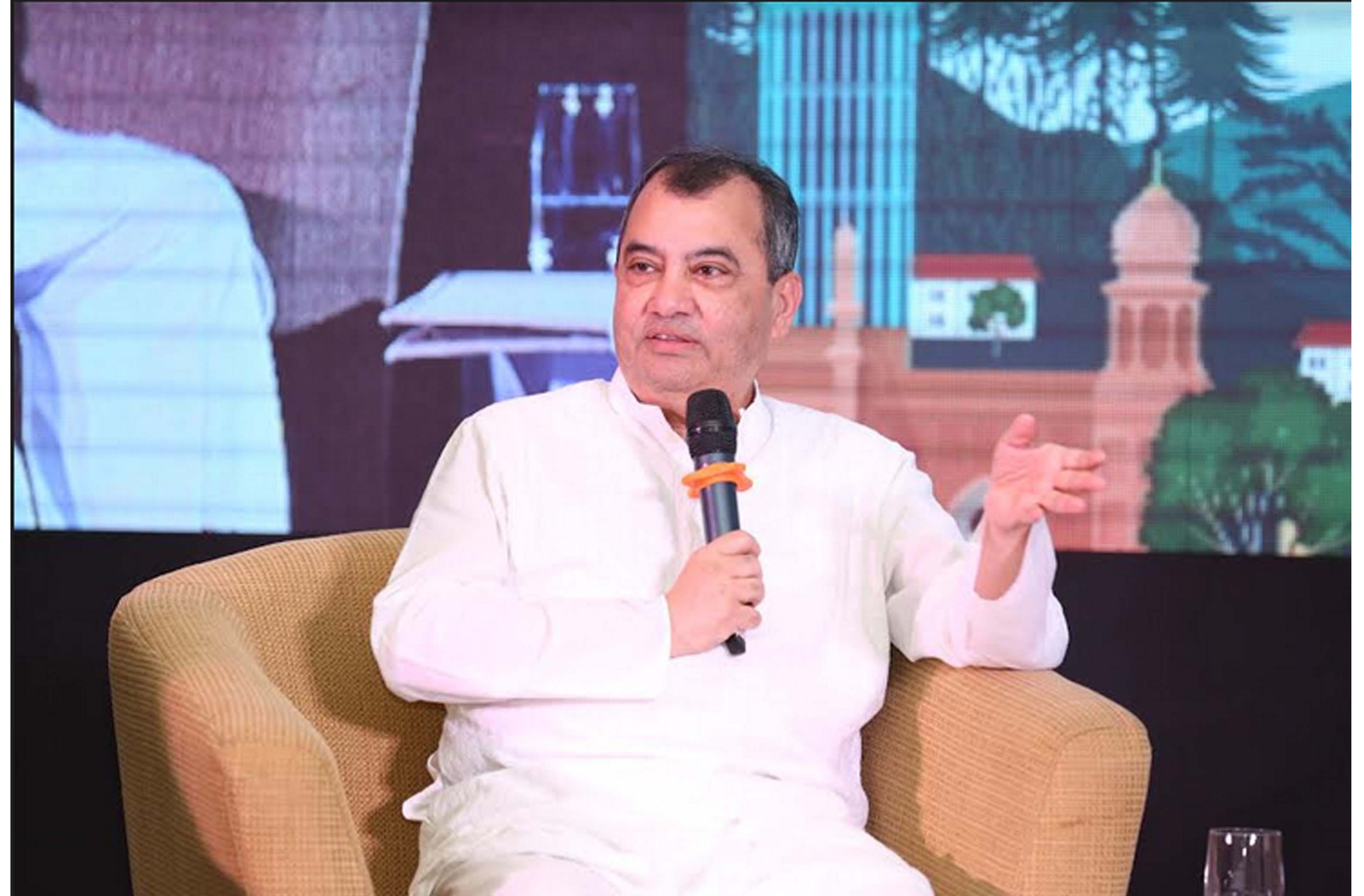
- Chowdhury in June 2024.

Minister of Environment, Forest and Climate Change
- In office 11 January 2024 – 6 August 2024
- Prime Minister: Sheikh Hasina
- Preceded by: Md. Shahab Uddin
- Succeeded by: Rizwana Hasan

Member of Parliament
- In office 25 January 2009 – 6 August 2024
- Preceded by: Khandokar Mahbub Uddin Ahmad
- Succeeded by: Habibur Rashid Habib
- Constituency: Dhaka-9

Special Envoy of Prime Minister of Bangladesh
- In office 12 June 2023 – 6 August 2024
- Preceded by: Hussain Muhammad Ershad

Deputy Minister of Shipping
- In office 1 January 1998 – 15 July 2001
- Prime Minister: Sheikh Hasina
- Preceded by: Dhirendra Debnath Shambhu

President of Bangladesh Cricket Board
- In office 4 July 1996 – 19 August 2001
- Preceded by: Mustafizur Rahman
- Succeeded by: M Akmal Hossain

Personal details
- Born: 10 September 1961 (age 65) Feni, East Pakistan, Pakistan
- Party: Bangladesh Awami League
- Spouse: Rehana Chowdhury
- Parents: Hedayat Hossain Chowdhury (father); Rasheda Hossain Chowdhury (mother)
- Relatives: Chowdhuries of Chittagong
- Education: SOAS, University of London; University of Westminster
- Website: saberchowdhury.com

Saber Hossain Chowdhury, OF (born 10 September 1961) is a Bangladeshi politician and a former Jatiya Sangsad member representing the Dhaka-9 constituency during 2008–2024. He was the president of Inter-Parliamentary Union from 2014 to 2017. He is a former president of the Bangladesh Cricket Board. He received the Order of Friendship, Russia's highest state decoration.

== Education and early career ==
Saber Hossain Chowdhury was born to Hedayat Hossain Chowdhury (1930–2014) and Rasheda Hossain Chowdhury (d. 2014). Hedayat was the founder of Karnaphuli Group, a conglomerate in Bangladesh. His mother is the sister of Fazlul Quader Chowdhury. His brother is Sayeed Hossain Chowdhury. At his early life, Saber was a student of Dhanmondi Government Boys' High School. He was a graduate of School of Oriental and African Studies, University of London and holds a double honors degree in economics and politics. He has also received a diploma in law from University of Westminster, United Kingdom. Having begun his career in the private sector as an entrepreneur, Chowdhury embraced full-time politics in 1996.

== Political career ==
Chowdhury is a former member of Jatiya Sangsad from Dhaka-9. He served as Deputy Minister of Ministry of Ports & Shipping and, later, as Deputy Minister for Local Government, Rural Development & Cooperatives (1999–2001). He was the youngest cabinet member during this period. Chowdhury was appointed in October 2001 as Political Secretary to President of Bangladesh Awami League, Sheikh Hasina, who was then the Leader of the Opposition in Parliament. Shortly thereafter, he was elected Organizing Secretary of the party with responsibility for Dhaka Division. He was appointed as Special Envoy for Climate Change by Prime Minister Sheikh Hasina on 12 June 2023.

== Inter Parliamentary Union ==
Chowdhury was the 28th President of Inter-Parliamentary Union (IPU). He was elected to the position on 16 October 2014 for a term of 3 years and is the first Bangladeshi to hold this post. IPU is the world organization of parliaments and is the focal point for worldwide parliamentary dialogue. IPU supports the efforts of and works in close cooperation with United Nations whose objectives its shares. It enjoys Permanent Observer status at the UN. As IPU President Chowdhury is also a member of the high-level group - Every Woman Every Child - a global movement to champion the health of women, children and adolescents led by former UN Secretary-General Ban Ki-moon.

First elected as a member of parliament from a central constituency in Dhaka-9 in June 1996, Chowdhury has been prominent in the enactment, through Private Member Bills, of groundbreaking legislation such as repeal of the Leper's Act. Now serving his third term in the Parliament, he is Chair of Parliamentary Standing Committee on Ministry of Jute and Textiles. Saber Hossain Chowdhury has been actively involved in Commonwealth Parliamentary Association (CPA) initiatives and served as a CPA resource person on orientation and capacity-building for Members of Parliament from Africa and the Small Island Developing States (SIDS) at the meeting of the Small Island and the Developing States Study Group on the Role of Parliament in Climate Change, held in Zanzibar, Tanzania, in May 2011. As Chair of the Asian Advisory Group of Parliamentarians for Disaster Risk Reduction and Global Champion of the United Nations Office on Disaster Risk Reduction (UNISDR), Chowdhury has worked with parliamentarians in Seoul in 2012 and Vientiane in 2014.

Chowdhury was arrested in October 2024 from Gulshan following the fall of the Sheikh Hasina led Awami League government.

== Awards and associations ==
Chowdhury given an award for the World No Tobacco Day by World Health Organization (WHO).

On 15 October 2017, Chowdhury was awarded the "Order of Friendship" by Vladimir Putin, the highest state honour provided to foreigners for his contribution to global development through IPU.

== Personal life ==
Saber Hossain Chowdhury is married to Rehana Chowdhury. They have two sons, Hamdan Hossain Chowdhury and Araj Alam Chowdhury, and two daughters, Raimah Chowdhury and Alisha Babar Chowdhury. His cousin is Haris Chowdhury, former political advisor to Prime Minister Khaleda Zia. Another cousin is former chief of Bangladesh Army Abu Saleh Mohammad Nasim.
