= Habibur Rashid Habib =

Bangladeshi politician

- হাবিবুর রশিদ হাবিব
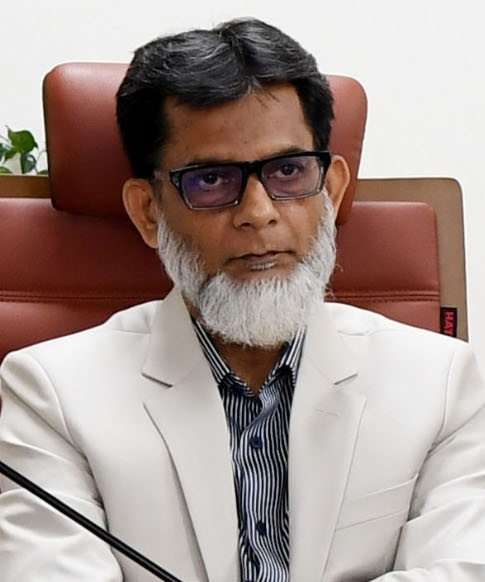
- Habib in 2026

Minister of State for Railways and Road Transport and Highways
- Incumbent
- Assumed office 17 February 2026
- Prime Minister: Tarique Rahman
- Preceded by: Golam Kader

Member of the Bangladesh Parliament for Dhaka-9
- Incumbent
- Assumed office 17 February 2026
- Preceded by: Saber Hossain Chowdhury

Personal details
- Born: 15 September 1973 (age 53)
- Party: Bangladesh Nationalist Party
- Spouse: Mabia Akhter
- Children: 3
- Education: Jagannath University
- Occupation: Politician

Habibur Rashid Habib (born 1973) is a Bangladeshi politician who, in February 2026, became the member of parliament for Dhaka-9 and state minister for the Ministry of Railways and Road Transport and Highways Division. He is a member of the Bangladesh Nationalist Party (BNP), having gotten his start in politics with their student wing, the Jatiyatabadi Chhatra Dal (JCD).

While rising through the leadership ranks of the JCD, he was shot, possibly by rival members of his own party. From 2012 onward, he led protests against the Awami League government. He was charged in over 100 cases of political violence and was imprisoned seven times for a total of eight years.

== Early life and education ==
Habib was born on 15 September 1973. He completed his secondary and higher secondary education at Motijheel Ideal High School and Dhaka City College, respectively. While at Dhaka City College, he became involved with the Jatiyatabadi Chhatra Dal (JCD), the student wing of the Bangladesh Nationalist Party (BNP). He later earned a master's degree in management from Jagannath University.

He married Mabia Akhter, and they had three sons together.

== Career ==
Habib was a contractor of the Public Works Department. By November 2010, he was also the convener of the Dhaka city (south) unit of the JCD. On 4 April 2011 in Dhaka, he was shot in the head and chest by assailants he publicly claimed were from the rival Bangladesh Chhatra League. A senior JCD leader told the newspaper The Daily Star that privately, Habib identified one of the attackers as an associate of the JCD general secretary. News portal Jagonews24.com called the shooting an internal party dispute.

Habib survived his wounds and became general secretary of the JCD central committee in September 2012 for a two-year term. In November 2013, he was arrested in cases of vandalism, arson, and obstructing police during hartals called by the BNP. By September 2014, at least 80 cases had been filed against him. While on bail, he was banned from leaving the country. Late that month, he was arrested at Hazrat Shahjalal International Airport trying to join his family in the United States.

By 2019, he held the position of joint general secretary of the Dhaka Metropolitan South unit of the BNP. He also became a member of the BNP's central executive committee. In 2023, Habib was convicted in cases of political violence, sabotage, and obstructing the police between 2012 and 2018. In November 2024 and January 2025, he was discharged from cases of vandalising vehicles and assaulting police in 2018. One conviction was also overturned in November 2024.

When the interim government of Muhammad Yunus called a general election for February 2026, Habib was nominated as the BNP's candidate for Dhaka-9. While campaigning he said that as an opposition leader he had been accused in more than 100 politically motivated legal cases. He spent 86 days on remand, and was imprisoned seven times for a total of eight years. He promised to bring development to his constituency. He pledged to fix roads and bridges, restore canals to end water-logging, improve education and healthcare, and deliver public safety.

Habib won the seat with 51.1 per cent of the votes. Prime Minister Tarique Rahman appointed him to his cabinet as state minister for road transport and bridges, railways and shipping on 17 February 2026. The next month portfolios were reallocated. He remained state minister for the Ministry of Railways and the Road Transport and Highways Division, while Md. Razib Ahsan became state minister for the Ministry of Shipping and the Bridges Division.
