= MA Syed =

8th Chief Election Commissioner of Bangladesh

8th Chief Election Commissioner of Bangladesh
- In office 23 May 2000 – 22 May 2005
- President: Shahabuddin Ahmed; Badruddoza Chowdhury; Muhammad Jamiruddin Sircar; Iajuddin Ahmed
- Prime Minister: Sheikh Hasina; Latifur Rahman; Khaleda Zia
- Preceded by: Mohammad Abu Hena
- Succeeded by: M. A. Aziz

Personal details
- Born: 1937 Gopalganj, British Raj
- Died: 12 January 2013 (aged 75–76) Dhaka
- Profession: Civil service

MA Syed (1937 - 12 January 2013) was a former government official of Bangladesh who was the chief election commissioner.

== Early life ==
Syed was born in 1937 in Gopalganj.

== Career ==
Syed began his career in 1960 by passing the Pakistan Civil Service (PCS) examination and joining the administrative cadre. He later served as the sub-divisional administrator, deputy commissioner and secretary to the government of Bangladesh. He took over as the Chief Election Commissioner of Bangladesh on 23 May 2000 and retired from the post on 22 May 2005. He oversaw the 8th parliamentary election of Bangladesh, which was held in 2001.

== Personal life ==
Syed's brother, Ibrahim Kamal, who was a senior assistant secretary, was stabbed to death near Holy Family Red Crescent Medical College Hospital in November 2004.

== Death ==
Syed died on 12 January 2013 at his home in Gulshan, Dhaka, Bangladesh.

== See also ==
- SM Zakaria
