= Bangladesh Awami Swechasebak League =

Volunteer wing of the Bangladesh Awami League

- বাংলাদেশ আওয়ামী স্বেচ্ছাসেবক লীগ

- Flag of Bangladesh Awami Swechasebak League
- Formation: 27 July 1994; 32 years ago
- Dissolved: 10 May 2025; 17 months ago (Banned)
- President: Gazi Mesbaul Hossain Shachchu
- Founder: AFM Bahauddin Nasim Mockbul Hossain
- General Secretary: Afzalur Rahman Babu
- Parent organisation: Bangladesh Awami League
- Website: Bangladesh Awami Swechasebak League

The Bangladesh Awami Swechasebak League (Bengali: বাংলাদেশ আওয়ামী স্বেচ্ছাসেবক লীগ) is an associate body and the volunteer wing of the Bangladesh Awami League. Gazi Mesbaul Hossain Shachchu is the president, and Afzalur Rahman Babu is the general secretary of the organization.

== History ==
Bangladesh Awami Swechasebak League was founded on 27 July 1994. It traces its origin to the Swechchhasebak Bahini, founded in 1949 at the establishment of the Awami League by Zillur Rahman.

In 2008, Pankaj Debnath, general secretary of the Bangladesh Awami Swechasebak League, was sentenced to jail for corruption by a special anti-corruption court established in the MP hostel of the Jatiya Sangshad complex by the Caretaker Government during the 2006-2008 Bangladeshi political crisis. He is the incumbent Member of Parliament from Barisal-4.

On 25 November 2013, Rabiul Islam, the general secretary of the Deyara Union unit of Awami Swecchasebak League, was killed in clashes with Bangladesh Nationalist Party supporters after they called a strike. Swechasabak League organized an exhibition on Sheikh Mujibur Rahman, called "History Speaks Up", at the Bangabandhu Memorial Museum on 15 August 2012. President of Sadarghat, Chittagong unit of Swechasebak League, Ibrahim Manik, was shot dead in December 2016 in Chittagong.

On 13 December 2018, Asadul Islam Ershad, general secretary of the Muladholi Union unit of the Awami Swechasebak League, was killed in general election-related violence.

On 12 May 2025, the government of Bangladesh banned all activities of the Awami League and its affiliated organisations under the Anti-Terrorism Act.
