= Channel S (Bangladeshi TV channel) =

Bangladeshi television channel

- Country: Bangladesh
- Broadcast area: Nationwide
- Headquarters: Segunbagicha, Dhaka

Programming
- Language: Bengali
- Picture format: 2160p UHD TV (downscaled to 16:9 576i for SDTV sets)

Ownership
- Owner: Sunshine Television Limited
- Key people: Ismat Kadir Gama (chairman); Sujit Chakraborty (managing director and CEO)

History
- Launched: 12 June 2024; 2 years ago

Links
- Website: channels.com.bd

Availability

Streaming media
- Jagobd: www.jagobd.com/channelsbd

Channel S (Bengali: চ্যানেল এস) is a Bangladeshi Bengali-language satellite and cable television channel owned by Sunshine Television Limited launched on 12 June 2024. It is based in Segunbagicha in Dhaka. Channel S is the first ultra-high definition television channel in Bangladesh utilizing AI technology.

== History ==
Channel S originally broadcast as an IPTV channel, but was later shut down by the Bangladesh Telecommunication Regulatory Commission in October 2021 as it was accused of broadcasting illegally. Ismat Kadir Gama later applied for a license to operate Channel S the same year.

It was officially launched on 12 June 2024 in a ceremony organized in the Jatiya Press Club auditorium with the "Shob Kotha Shobar Kotha" (সব কথা সবার কথা; lit. 'Everything is the saying of everyone') slogan. The channel's launch was announced by Bangladeshi president Mohammed Shahabuddin.
