= A. Q. M. Mahbub =

Bangladeshi academic administrator

3rd Vice-chancellor of Bangabandhu Sheikh Mujibur Rahman Science and Technology University
- In office 2 September 2020 – 20 August 2024
- Preceded by: Khondoker Md Nasiruddin

Personal details
- Education: PhD
- Alma mater: University of Dhaka; University of Canterbury
- Occupation: Academic

A. Q. M. Mahbub is a Bangladeshi academic and former vice-chancellor of the Bangabandhu Sheikh Mujibur Rahman Science and Technology University. He is a former professor of the Department of Geography and the Environment at University of Dhaka.

He works on the themes of environment, population mobility and urban planning.

== Biography ==
Mahbub completed his BSc in 1975 and MSc in 1976 at the University of Dhaka. Two years later, he joined the faculty there as a lecturer in the Department of Geography.

He received his PhD in 1986 from University of Canterbury in New Zealand, for his dissertation Population Mobility in Rural Bangladesh: The Circulation of Working People. Thereafter he continued to teach at the University of Dhaka, and became full professor in the Department of Geography and the Environment in 1997.

After retirement from the University of Dhaka, he was appointed as the vice-chancellor of Bangabandhu Sheikh Mujibur Rahman Science and Technology University (BSMRSTU), Gopalganj in 2020.

In February 2022, Mahbub joined BSMRSTU teachers and students in demonstrating against the gang rape of a student. He was injured when protestors were attacked by alleged members of the Bangladesh Chatra League. After four days of protests, the academic council, chaired by Mahbub, suspended classes for three days.

== Publications ==
- Mahbub, A. Q. M. (1983). Population mobility in rural Bangladesh: The circulation of working people (PhD). University of Canterbury. doi:10.26021/7442.
- Mahbub, A. Q. M (1997). Mobility behaviour of working people in Bangladesh: rural-rural and rural-urban circulation. Urban Studies Programme, Dept. of Geography and Environment, University of Dhaka. ISBN 978-984-510-012-0. OCLC 40142751.
- Angeles, Gustavo; Lance, Peter; Barden-O'Fallon, Janine; Islam, Nazrul; Mahbub, AQM; Nazem, Nurul Islam (8 June 2009). "The 2005 census and mapping of slums in Bangladesh: design, select results and application". International Journal of Health Geographics. 8 (1): 32. doi:10.1186/1476-072X-8-32. ISSN 1476-072X. PMC 2701942. PMID 19505333.
- Mahmood, Riffat; Mahbub, A. Q. M. (2018). "Building Vulnerable Islander Resilience to Natural Hazard: A Participatory Approach". Handbook of Climate Change Resilience. Springer. pp. 1–30. doi:10.1007/978-3-319-71025-9_107-1. ISBN 978-3-319-71025-9. S2CID 134986489.
