= Dainik Bangla =

Bangladeshi daily newspaper

- Type: Daily newspaper
- Format: Broadsheet
- Publisher: Chowdhury Nafeez Sharafat
- Editor: Chowdhury Jafarullah Sharafat (acting)
- Founded: 4 September 2022
- Language: Bengali
- Website: www.dainikbangla.com.bd

The Dainik Bangla is a Bengali-language daily newspaper in Bangladesh. The newspaper was closed in 1997 and was later revived on 4 September 2022 by an editorial panel led by Nazrul Islam Mazumder and Chowdhury Nafeez Sarafat.

== History ==
Dainik Pakistan was renamed Dainik Bangla after the independence of Bangladesh in 1971. After independence, the newspaper published reports on Bengali collaborators of the Pakistan Army and war crimes. The reports were used as evidence in the Bangladesh war crimes tribunal. In 1972, Hasan Hafizur Rahman was elected president of the editorial board of the Dainik Bangla. Toab Khan, press secretary to President Sheikh Mujibur Rahman, became editor of the newspaper in 1972.

In 1975, the government of Bangladesh closed all newspapers except The Daily Ittefaq, The Bangladesh Times, The Bangladesh Observer and the Dainik Bangla, which were nationalised. After the assassination of Sheikh Mujibur Rahman in the 15 August 1975 Bangladesh coup d'état, the newspaper, then state-owned, stopped reporting about him and did not cover the anniversary of his death. The newspaper was closed by the Bangladesh Awami League government in 1997 along with other state-owned media, The Bangladesh Times and Saptahik Bichitra.

In 2022, Dainik Bangla was revived under Toab Khan, Chowdhury Jafarullah Sharafat, and financially backed by Chowdhury Nafeez Sarafat.

== Legacy ==
An important road junction in Dhaka, Dainik Bangla intersection, has been named after the newspaper.
