= Z. A. Morshed =

Deputy Inspector General of the Bangladesh Police

Z. A. Morshed (died 2013) was an additional deputy inspector general of the Bangladesh Police. He died in the Mirpur textile factory fire in 2013.

== Career ==
Morshed joined the police cadre from the 12 batch of Bangladesh Civil Service.

During the 2001-2006 Bangladesh Nationalist Party rule, Morshed was denied promotions and prestigious postings due to being from Gopalganj District, which is viewed as a stronghold of the opposition Awami League. The Bangladesh Nationalist Party government denied promotions to police officers from Gopalganj District, Faridpur District and religious minority communities. In 2001, he was transferred to the Armed Police Battalion in Bilaychchari, Rangamati District. He went on to serve with the Armed Police Battalion in Uttara and Sylhet.

In 2010, Morshed was the superintendent of police of Chittagong District. During his time, Hefazate Islam Bangladesh emerged as a political force in Chittagong District, indulging in violent clashes with the police. He detained 250 students at the University of Chittagong following violent clashes between students and vandalism. While he was there, the 2012 Hathazari violence took place, which was a communal clash between the majority Muslim community and the minority Hindu community. The clashes started after a rumor went viral on Facebook alleging some Hindus had desecrated the Koran.

== Death ==
Morshed died at a fire on 2 May 2013 in the factory of Tung Hai Sweater Limited in Darus Salam Thana. He was rescued from the fire and died at the National Institute of Cardiovascular Diseases emergency room. He was then an additional deputy inspector general of the police. Six others were killed in the fire, including Sohel Mostafa Swapan, president of Comilla District North unit of Jubo League, and Mahbubur Rahman, managing director of Tung Hai Sweater Limited and Morshed's friend. There were 200-300 workers in the garment factory at the time of the fire. The fire took place at around the same time Rana Plaza collapsed. His bodyguard, Ripon Chakma, also died in the fire.
