= Kazi Wasi Uddin =

Kazi Wasi Uddin is the Ministry of Housing and Public Works secretary. He is a former additional secretary to the Ministry of Fisheries and Livestock.

== Early life ==
Uddin was born in Tarail, Kashiani Upazila, Gopalganj District. He completed his SSC and HSC from Fukra Madan Mohan Academy and Ramdia Govt SK College in 1979 and 1981 respectively. He completed his bachelor's and master's degrees from the University of Dhaka in 1985 and 1986 respectively.

== Career ==
Uddin joined the administration cadre of the Bangladesh Civil Service on 26 January 1991.

Uddin served as an Upazila Nirbahi Officer and later magistrate of Dhaka WASA. He oversaw evictions from Ramchandrapur Canal as magistrate in 2011. He carried out drives to evict illegal structures on Kalyanpur Kha Canal.

Uddin was the additional secretary to the Ministry of Fisheries and Livestock. Faculty and students of the University of Dhaka criticized him in July 2019 after he asked Professor ABM Faroque of the university to publish his research or face legal action after Faroque held a press conference which showed that he had found milk sold in Bangladesh was contaminated with detergent and antibiotics. Bangladesh Food Safety Authority sued 10 milk producers following the research and subsequent order from the High Court Division. The High Court issued a five-week ban on selling milk by 14 companies.

On 22 September 2022, Uddin was promoted to secretary and appointed to the Ministry of Housing and Public Works replacing Shahid Ullah Khandaker. He was the former additional secretary of the Ministry of Housing and Public Works. Justice J. B. M. Hassan and Justice Razik-Al-Jalil issued a contempt of court ruling against him and three officials of the Rajdhani Unnayan Kartripakkha including its chairman Md Anisur Rahman Miah in December 2022 for failure to evict commercial firms from Dhanmondi, a residential neighborhood.

Uddin was criticised for spending 10 million BDT of government funds to convert a substation on 40 Bailey Road into a duplex through the Public Works Department which is under the Ministry of Housing and Public Works. After which he moved into the duplex with his family paying a monthly rent of 5,885 BDT. The previous tenant, an executive engineer of the Public Works Department, was transferred outside of Dhaka to vacate the house. He had also allocated plots in Uttara and Purbachal and an apartment in the Lalmatia Dolon Chapa to himself.

Uddin's tenure at the Ministry of Housing and Public Works was extended through a one-year contractual extension in March 2023. He released a master plan for Gaibandha municipality developed by BRAC, Gaibandha municipality, and the Urban Development Directorate.

Uddin was sentenced to 18 years to prison in a case over allocation of plots in Purbachal to Sheikh Hasina and her family members.
