= Dhaka-9 =

Constituency of Bangladesh's Jatiya Sangsad

Coordinates: 23.74°N 90.44°E

- Constituency for the Jatiya Sangsad
- District: Dhaka District
- Division: Dhaka Division
- Electorate: 463,444 (2026)

Current constituency
- Created: 1973
- Party: Bangladesh Nationalist Party
- Member: Habibur Rashid Habib
- ← 181 Dhaka-8 183 Dhaka-10 →

Dhaka-9 is a constituency represented in the Jatiya Sangsad (National Parliament) of Bangladesh since 2026 by Habibur Rashid Habib of the Bangladesh Nationalist Party.

== Boundaries ==
The constituency encompasses Dhaka South City Corporation wards 1 through 7, and three union parishads of Khilgaon and Sabujbagh thanas: Dakshingaon, Manda, and Nasirabad.

== History ==
The constituency was created for the first general elections in newly independent Bangladesh, held in 1973.

Ahead of the 2008 general election, the Bangladesh Election Commission redrew constituency boundaries to reflect population changes revealed by the 2001 Bangladesh census. The 2008 redistricting added 7 new seats to the Dhaka metropolitan area, increasing the number of constituencies in the capital from 8 to 15, and altered the boundaries of the constituency.

== Members of Parliament ==
Election	Member	Party
1973	Rafiq Uddin Ahmed	Awami League
1979	Nurul Haque	Bangladesh Nationalist Party
Major Boundary Changes
1986	Mahmudul Hasan	Jatiya Party
1988	M Korban Ali	Jatiya Party
1990 by-election	Abul Hasnat	Jatiya Party
Sep 1991 by-election	Jamiruddin Sarkar	Bangladesh Nationalist Party
Feb 1996	Khandokar Mahbub Uddin Ahmad	Bangladesh Nationalist Party
Jun 1996	Makbul Hossain	Awami League
2001	Khandokar Mahbub Uddin Ahmad	Bangladesh Nationalist Party
Major Boundary Changes
2008	Saber Hossain Chowdhury	Awami League
2026	Habibur Rashid Habib	Bangladesh Nationalist Party

== Elections ==
=== Elections in the 2020s ===
General Election 2026: Dhaka-9
Party	Candidate	Votes	%	±%
BNP	Habibur Rashid Habib	111,212	51.1	N/A
NCP	Mohammad Jabed Miah	53,460	24.6	N/A
Independent	Tasnim Jara	44,684	20.5	N/A
IAB	Shah Iftekhar Ahsan	5,827	2.7	N/A
JP(E)	Kazi Abul Khair	1,202	0.6	N/A
CPB	Md. Moniruzzaman	462	0.2	N/A
NPP	Shaheen Khan	204	0.1	N/A
Gano Forum	Nazma Akhtar	171	0.1	N/A
IBB	Nahid Hasan Chowdhury Junaid	131	0.1	N/A
BNF	Muhammad Shafi Ullah Chowdhury	124	0.1	N/A
BML	Masud Hossain	118	0.1	N/A
BSD (Marxist)	Khandaker Mizanur Rahman	93	0.0	N/A
Majority		57,752	26.5	N/A
Turnout		217,688	46.4	N/A
Registered electors		469,360		
BNP gain from AL				

=== Elections in the 2010s ===
General Election 2018: Dhaka-9
Party	Candidate	Votes	%	±%
AL	Saber Hossain Chowdhury	224,230	52.70	N/A
BNP	Afroza Abbas	59,165	13.90	N/A
IAB	Md Manik Mia	4,917	1.16	N/A
Majority		165,065	38.80	N/A
Turnout		288,312	67.77	N/A
Registered electors		425,501		
AL hold				

Saber Hossain Chowdhury was re-elected unopposed in the 2014 general election after opposition parties withdrew their candidacies in a boycott of the election.

=== Elections in the 2000s ===
General Election 2008: Dhaka-9
Party	Candidate	Votes	%	±%
AL	Saber Hossain Chowdhury	179,756	64.9	+25.7
BNP	Shirin Sultana	92,227	33.3	−24.0
IAB	Md. Fazlul Haq Mrida	2,648	1.0	N/A
Bangladesh Kalyan Party	Shadek Ahmed Khan	585	0.2	N/A
BDB	Nishar Uddin Ahmed Kazal	444	0.2	N/A
BKA	Abdur Rashid Gazi	441	0.2	−0.1
NPP	Harun or Rashid	220	0.1	N/A
BJP	Rahmat Ullah	172	0.1	N/A
BSD	Md. Emam Hossain Khan	140	0.1	N/A
Gano Forum	Juleka Haq Mrida	110	0.0	N/A
People's Front	Krishak Md. Shadek	82	0.0	N/A
JSD	Nurul Absar	22	0.0	N/A
Majority		87,529	31.6	+13.5
Turnout		276,847	77.7	+21.4
AL gain from BNP				

General Election 2001: Dhaka-9
Party	Candidate	Votes	%	±%
BNP	Khandokar Mahbub Uddin Ahmad	126,985	57.3	+17.4
AL	Makbul Hossain	86,908	39.2	−5.1
IJOF	Md. Nasir Uddin Mamun	5,636	2.5	N/A
BKA	Md. Shahidul Alam Chowdhury	544	0.2	+0.1
CPB	Abdul Maleq	465	0.2	N/A
Bangladesh Samajtantrik Dal (Basad-Khalekuzzaman)	Bazlur Rashid Firoz	290	0.1	N/A
Independent	Eaar Ahmed	204	0.1	N/A
JSD	Md. Abdul Khaleque	154	0.1	N/A
Samridhya Bangladesh Andolan	Khaleda Begum	101	0.0	−3.2
Jatiya Party (M)	Md. Mahbubur Rahman	93	0.0	N/A
Independent	Md. Sohrab Khan	83	0.0	N/A
Independent	Abu Bakar Siddiq	49	0.0	N/A
Despram Party	Marshal Shah Alam	33	0.0	N/A
Independent	Md. Shah Alam	33	0.0	N/A
Independent	Md. Ali Akbar Khan	31	0.0	N/A
Islamic Sashantantrik Andolan	Md. Abdul Halim	24	0.0	N/A
Independent	Rashidul Habib	18	0.0	N/A
Majority		40,077	18.1	+13.7
Turnout		221,651	56.3	−10.2
BNP gain from AL				

=== Elections in the 1990s ===
General Election June 1996: Dhaka-9
Party	Candidate	Votes	%	±%
AL	Makbul Hossain	84,150	44.3	
BNP	Mir Showkat Ali	75,855	39.9	
JP(E)	Kazi Firoj Rashid	8,738	4.6	
Samridhya Bangladesh Andolan	Salman F. Rahman	6,061	3.2	
Jamaat	Md. Nazrul Islam	5,626	3.0	
Gano Forum	Kamal Hossain	5,185	2.7	
IOJ	Md. Ali Akbar	1,804	0.9	
Zaker Party	Md. Shafiuddin	749	0.4	
Desh Prem Party	Marshal Shah Alam	532	0.3	
Independent	Faiz Ahmed	251	0.1	
BKA	Md. Rabiul Alam Chowdhury	160	0.1	
Bangladesh Samajtantrik Dal (Khalekuzzaman)	Bazlur Rashid Firoz	153	0.1	
Pragotishil Ganatantrik Sakti	Wahiduzzaman	134	0.1	
Bangladesh Jatiya Agrani Party	Abdur Rahman Sakdar	131	0.1	
Independent	Md. F. Rahman	122	0.1	
Jana Dal	Shamim Rahman Talukdar	86	0.0	
Pragotishi Jatiatabadi Dal (Nurul A Moula)	Md. Mustafizur Rahman Khan Mostafa	71	0.0	
Jatiya Janata Party (Asad)	Md. Mahabubur Rahman	45	0.0	
FP	A. S. M. Jamaluddin	35	0.0	
Bangladesh Krishak Raj Islami Party (F.Hq. Sardar)	Qari Md. Fazlul Haque Sardar	33	0.0	
Bangladesh Islamic Biplobi Parishad	Sk. Md. Obaidullah Bin S. Jalalabad	29	0.0	
Independent	Farid Uddin Zakir Khan	23	0.0	
Bangladesh Manabadhikar Dal	B. H. Rana	20	0.0	
Independent	Md. Arif Howlader	18	0.0	
Majority		8,295	4.4	
Turnout		190,011	66.5	
AL gain from BNP				

Khaleda Zia stood for five seats in the 1991 general election: Bogra-7, Dhaka-5, Dhaka-9, Feni-1, and Chittagong-8. After winning all five, she chose to represent Feni-1 and quit the other four, triggering by-elections in them. J. U. Sirker of the BNP was elected in a September 1991 by-election.

General Election 1991: Dhaka-9
Party	Candidate	Votes	%	±%
BNP	Khaleda Zia	55,946	60.4	
AL	Sajeda Chowdhury	29,464	31.8	
Jamaat	Md. Ruhul Amin	2,505	2.7	
JP(E)	Umme Kawser Salma Bin	1,829	2.0	
Zaker Party	Taufiqur Rahman	928	1.0	
BKA	Md. Shahidul Alam Chowdhury	455	0.5	
Bangladesh Janata Party	Shamsuddin Ahmed	432	0.5	
Janata Mukti Party	Salah Uddin Chowdhury Bulu	408	0.4	
Independent	Shah Alam	144	0.2	
Pragotishil Ganatantrik Sakti	Md. Wahiduzzaman	120	0.1	
Independent	S. M. Majibar Rahman Majnu	94	0.1	
Independent	Shahab Uddin Ahmed	75	0.1	
JSD (S)	Zahanara Begum	46	0.0	
Pragotishi Jatiatabadi Dal (Nurul A Moula)	Md. Mostafizur Rahman Mostafa	40	0.0	
Bangladesh Bekar Samaj	Zahurul Alam	39	0.0	
BAKSAL	M. A. Satter	36	0.0	
Jatiya Sramajibi Party	Abdul Khalek	28	0.0	
NAP (Bhashani-Mur Mohammad Kazi)	Mujibur Rahman	27	0.0	
Bangladesh Jatiya People's Party	Md. Abdul Hai	25	0.0	
Bangladesh Manobatabadi Dal	Md. Razu Ahmed Razu	25	0.0	
Bangladesh Muslim League (Kader)	A. F. M. Harunar Rashid	19	0.0	
Independent	A. Naser Ajam Khan	15	0.0	
Majority		26,482	28.6	
Turnout		92,700	50.3	
BNP gain from JP(E)				
