= Abdullah Baqui =

Bangladeshi public health scientist

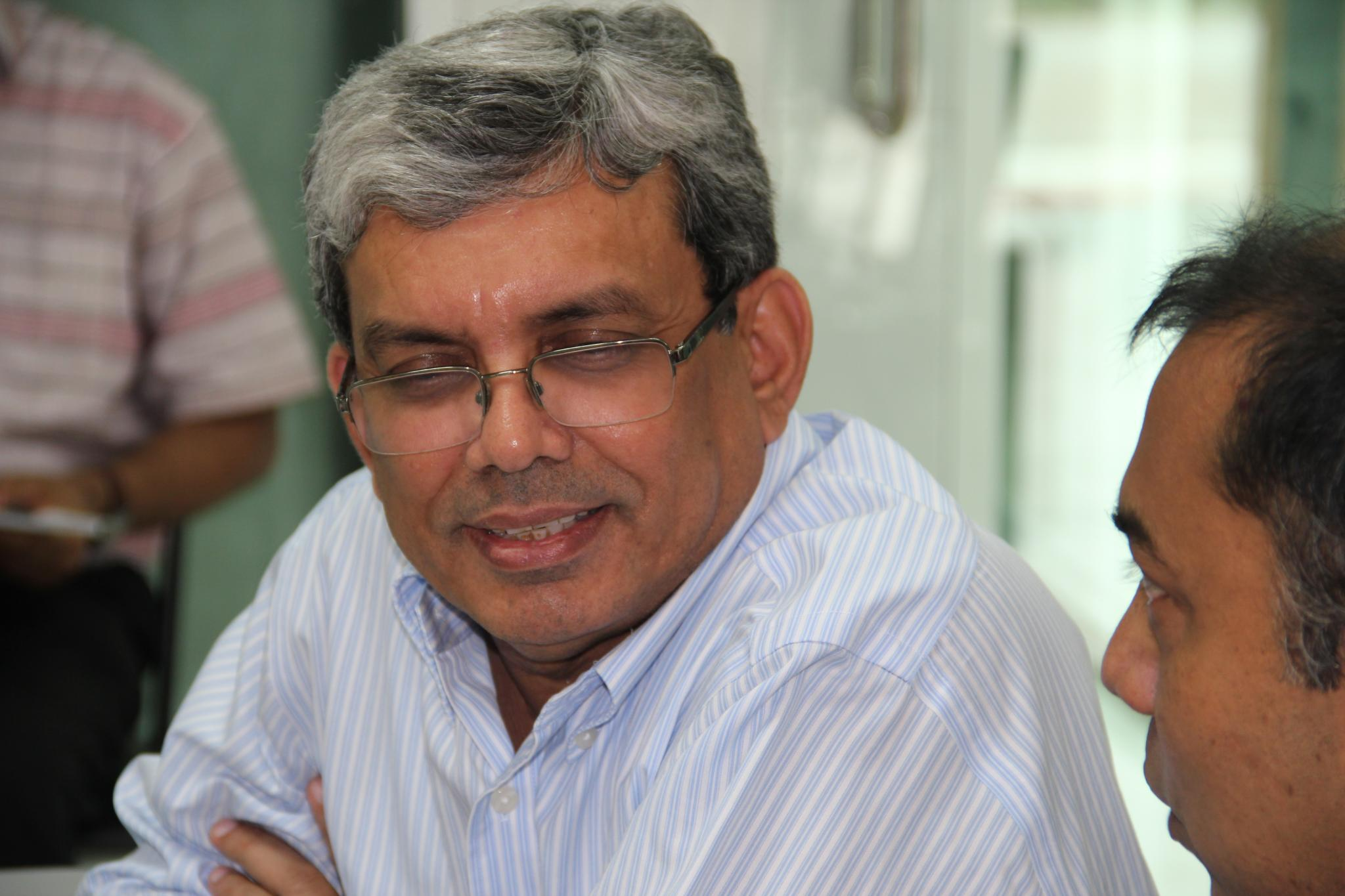
Abdullah H. Baqui (left) at Kumudini Medical College Hospital in 2012

Abdullah H. Baqui is a public health scientist who demonstrated the effectiveness of simple strategies to reduce preventable newborn deaths.

== Biography ==
Baqui was born and grew up in Gopalganj district in East Pakistan (now Bangladesh). He graduated from Dhaka Medical College in 1976, and completed his Master of Public Health (MPH) and Doctor of Public Health (DrPH) from Johns Hopkins Bloomberg School of Public Health, Baltimore, US in 1985 and in 1990 respectively.

Baqui's research confirmed: (a) the use of zinc supplementation during diarrhea to reduce the severity of child mortality. (b) the effectiveness of trained community health workers providing home based health care to reduce neonatal mortality by one-third. and (c) use of Hib vaccination in Bangladesh to reduce the incidence of meningitis and X-ray documented pneumonia in children. WHO and UNICEF have now recommended the use of zinc as an adjuvant therapy for diarrheal episode. Bangladesh developed a national neonatal health strategy in 2009 that references Baqui's work. More recently a WHO-UNICEF joint statement recommends home visits by trained community health worker as a strategy to improve neonatal survival, based in part on Baqui's research.

Baqui became a professor in the Department of International Health at Johns Hopkins Bloomberg School of Public Health in 2009.

In May 2012, the CORE Group honored Baqui with the Dory Storms Child Survival Recognition Award. Baqui also received a recognition award in 2012 from the Bangladesh Medical Association in North America.
