= Ismat Kadir Gama =

Bangladeshi businessman

Ismat Kadir Gama is a businessman and former general secretary of Bangladesh Chhatra League from 1972 to 1973. He is the vice-chairperson of Freedom Fighters Central Command Council. He is member of Gopalganj District Samiti.

Gama is a presidium member of the Bangladesh-Bharat Friendship Society (Bangladesh-Bharat Maitree Samity).

== Early life ==
Gama was born in Gopalganj District.

== Career ==
Gama was the assistant secretary of the East Pakistan Chhatra League. After the start of Bangladesh Liberation War, he went to train in Dehradun, India. He fought in the Mujib Bahini. He fought in Bhatiapara, Gopalganj District.

Gama was made the general secretary of general secretary of Bangladesh Chhatra League after Shajahan Siraj was expelled in 1972.

After the Assassination of Sheikh Mujibur Rahman, Gama and other leaders of Bangladesh Chhatra League tried to prevent coup leader Khandaker Mostaque Ahmed from holding a meeting with Awami League member of parliament.

On 3 January 2000, Gama met with leaders of Jamiatul Modaresin along with ASHK Sadek, Minister of Education, and talked about removing those who opposed the independence of Bangladesh from Madrassah education system.

In November 2011, Gama requested Minister of Home Affairs Sahara Khatun to detain Ghulam Azam on war crimes charges for his role during the Bangladesh Liberation War.

Gama was given a crest on the 69th anniversary of Chhatra League in 2017 by Prime Minister Sheikh Hasina.

Gama is the founding chairman of Channel S, launched on 12 June 2024, with Sujit Chakrabarty as managing director. It is the first television channel in Bangladesh utilizing artificial intelligence.

== Personal life ==
Gama was married to Mahfuza Chowdhury Parvin, the principal of Eden Mohila College from 2009 to 2018. She was killed by her domestic workers on 10 February 2018 at her home on Elephant Road. He filed a murder case with the New Market police station. Her maids, Rita Akter and Ruma, were charged with her murder and sentenced to death by Judge Abu Zafar Md. Kamaruzzaman of Speedy Trial Tribunal-1 of Dhaka.
