= Gopalganj Sadar Upazila =

Gopalganj Sadar গোপালগঞ্জ সদর
- Upazila
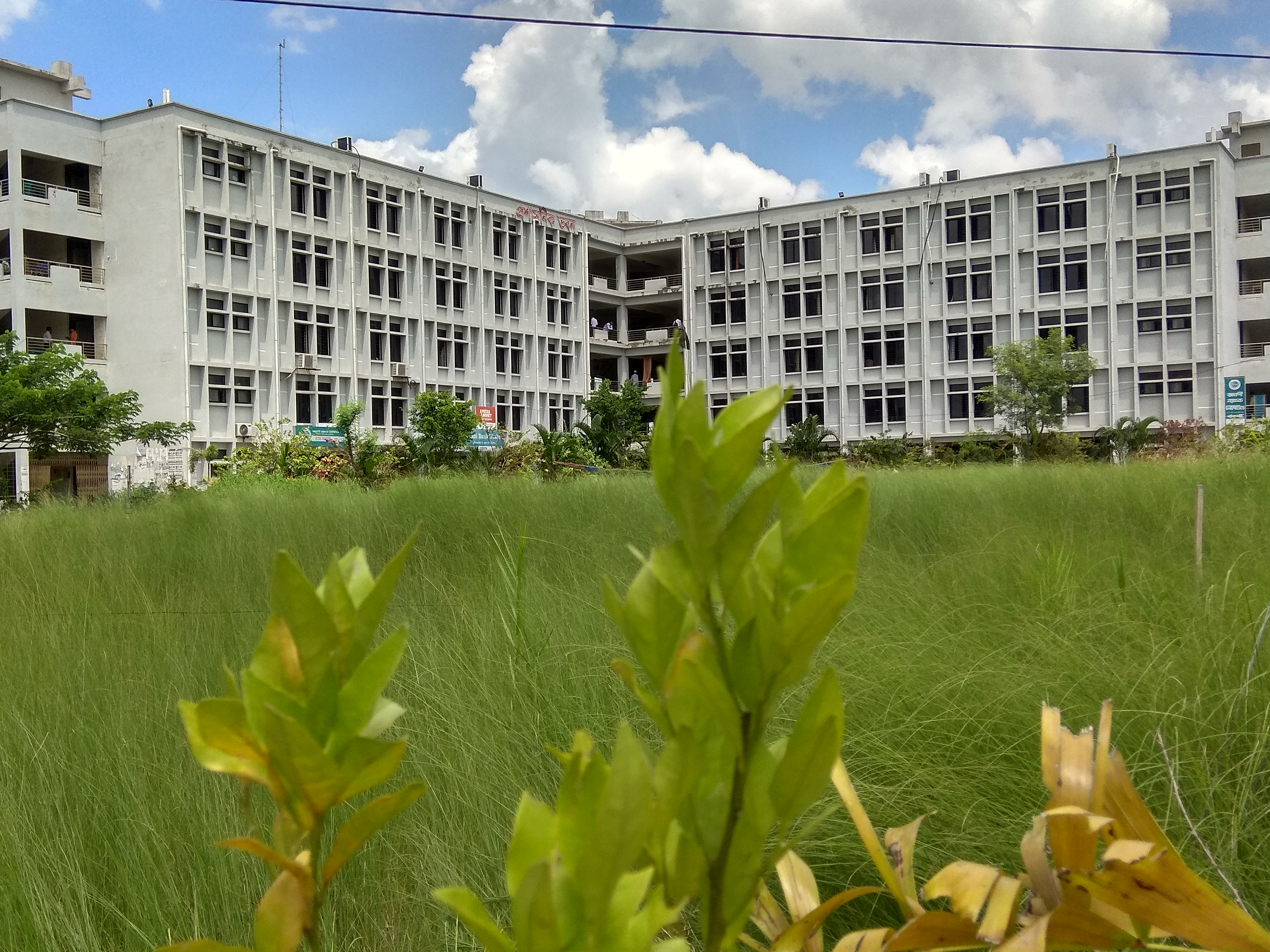
- Gopalganj Science and Technology University

- Coordinates: 23°1′N 89°50′E
- Country: Bangladesh
- Division: Dhaka
- District: Gopalganj
- Headquarters: Gopalganj

Area
  - Total: 389.61 km^{2} (150.43 sq mi)

Population (2022)
  - Total: 401,160
  - Density: 1,029.6/km^{2} (2,666.8/sq mi)
- Time zone: UTC+6 (BST)
- Postal code: 8100
- Area code: 0668
- Website: Official Map of Gopalganj Sadar
- dcgopalganj.gov.bd

Gopalganj Sadar Upazila mauza geocode map

Gopalganj Sadar (Bengali: গোপালগঞ্জ সদর) is an upazila of Gopalganj District in Dhaka Division, Bangladesh.

== History ==
Gopalganj Sadar is the main town of Gopalganj District. 15 MPs are from there. It has 15 banks, including 3 commercial banks. It may take two or three hours to reach by road from Rajdhani after build the Padma bridge (depending on traffic). After the Bangladesh Liberation War, Gopalgonj Sadar became 'Pourashava'. As a close fellow of Bangabandhu Sheikh Mujibur Rahman, Panna Biswas of Gimadanga was selected as first chairman. Khan Saheb Sheikh Mosharrof Hossain, Molla Jalaluddin Ahmed, Hemaet Uddin, Wahiduzzaman, and Fayekuzzaman are well-known figures among the others born in Sadar upazila.

== Geography ==
Gopalganj Sadar is located at 23.0167°N 89.8333°E. It has 73,126 households and a total area of 391.35 km^{2}.

== Demographics ==
According to the 2022 Bangladeshi census, Gopalganj Sadar Upazila had 93,688 households and a population of 401,160. 9.54% of the population were under 5 years of age. Gopalganj Sadar had a literacy rate (age 7 and over) of 82.32%: 84.18% for males and 80.46% for females, and a sex ratio of 100.37 males for every 100 females. 133,870 (33.37%) lived in urban areas.

Religions in Gopalganj Sadar Upazila (2022)
Religion	Percent
Islam	76.15%
Hinduism	23.41%
Christianity	0.42%
Other or not stated	0.02%

Population by religion in Union/Paurashava
Union/Paurashava	Muslim	Hindu	Others
Gopalganj Paurashava	86,685	20,416	1,407
Borashi Union	9,313	1,149	3
Boultali Union	2,999	7,906	5
Chandradighalia Union	11,088	311	2
Durgapur Union	10,094	4,129	3
Gobra Union	8,295	1,720	3
Gopinathpur Union	13,291	558	4
Haridaspur Union	10,821	1,297	0
Jalalabad Union	15,858	897	1
Kajulia Union	9,693	3,859	6
Karpara Union	18,974	2,937	2
Kathi Union	11,041	769	1
Latifpur Union	13,663	798	0
Majhigati Union	11,843	1,510	1
Nijra Union	5,417	1,131	0
Paikkandi Union	18,637	447	5
Raghunathpur Union	9,834	7,415	191
Sahapur Union	13	10,700	2
Satpar Union	1,903	17,770	124
Shuktail Union	14,532	737	2
Ulpur Union	11,147	6,146	4
Urfi Union	10,324	1,305	0

🟩 Muslim majority 🟧 Hindu majority

According to the 2011 Census of Bangladesh, Gopalganj Sadar Upazila had 73,126 households and a population of 344,008. 82,958 (24.12%) were under 10 years of age. Gopalganj Sadar had a literacy rate (age 7 and over) of 61.82%, compared to the national average of 51.8%, and a sex ratio of 989 females per 1000 males. 53,778 (15.63%) lived in urban areas.

According to the 1991 Bangladesh census, Gopalganj Sadar had a population of 291,409. Males constituted 50.73% of the population, and females 49.27%. The population aged 18 or over was 141,978. Gopalganj Sadar had an average literacy rate of 44.7% (7+ years), against the national average of 32.4%.

It has 57 schools, 13 colleges, and 2 university colleges.

== Places of interest ==
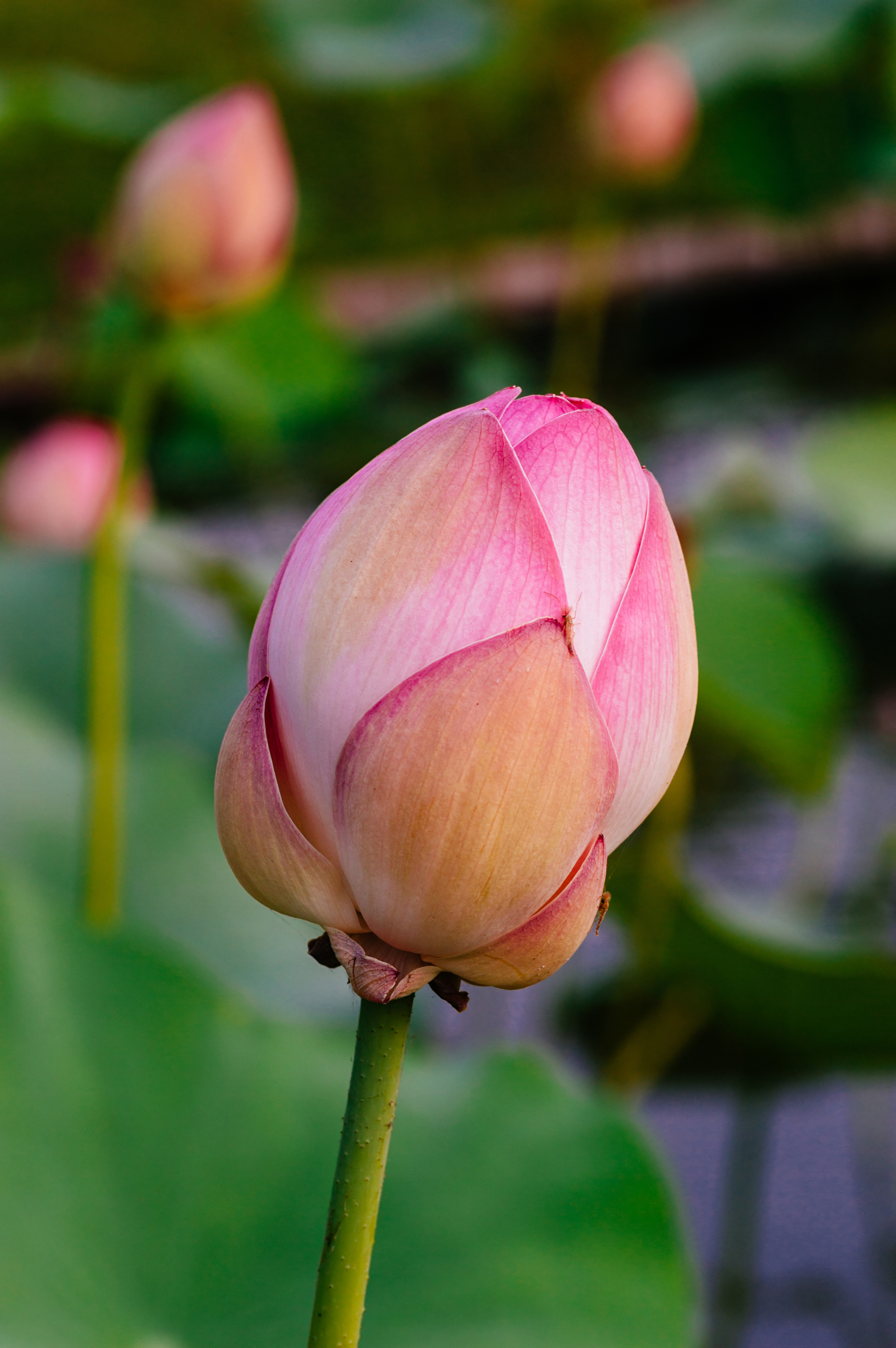
Lotus bud.

- Ulpur has a former Zamindar palace which is known as "Ulpur Zamindar Bari". Now a part of that palace currently used as Tehsil Office.
- Arpara also has a former Zamindar Palace which is known as "Arpara Zamindar Bari". One of the oldest historical Mosque "Munshi Bari Jame Mosjid" is also situated in Arpara village under Verarhat. There also have a tourist attraction and picnic spot called "Arpara Park". This is one of the most beautiful botanical garden in the entire district.
- Balakoir Beel, 12 kilometres (7.5 mi) northeast of the city, is a tourist attraction during the rainy season, when the wetland is carpeted with lotus flowers.

== Administration ==
Gopalganj Sadar Upazila is divided into Gopalganj Municipality and 21 union parishads: Borasi, Baultali, Chandra Dighalia, Durgapur, Gobra, Gopinathpur, Haridaspur, Jalalabad, Kajulia, Karpara, Kati, Latifpur, Majhigati, Nizra, Paikkandi, Raghunathpur, Sahapur, Satpar, Suktail, Ulpur, and Upafi. The union parishads are subdivided into 127 mauzas and 197 villages.

Gopalganj Municipality is subdivided into 9 wards and 47 mahallas.

== Education ==
There are ten colleges in the upazila: Government Bangabandhu College, Gopalgonj, Dr. Dilawar Husain Memorial College, Government Nazrul Degree College Satpar, Haji Lalmia City College, Kazi Zahural Huq College, Krishnapur Shaptodas Palli College, M. H. Khan Degree College, N. Haque College of Business & Technology, Sabira - Rouf College, and Sheikh Fazilatunnesa Government Women's College.

There also have some famous higher secondary school. They are: S. M. Model Government High School, Sultanshahi Kakania High School (1944), Swarnakali High School, Arpara Islamia High School, Ulpur PC High School (1900), Boutali Sahapur Sammilani High School, founded in 1928, Karpara Union High School (1936), Satpar Dinnnath Goyali Chandra High School, Chandra Dighalia High School, and Gopinathpur High School (1911) are notable secondary schools.

== See also ==
- Upazilas of Bangladesh
- Districts of Bangladesh
- Divisions of Bangladesh
- Thanas of Bangladesh
