= Hossain Uddin Shekhar =

Bangladeshi biochemist

- হোসেন উদ্দিন শেখর
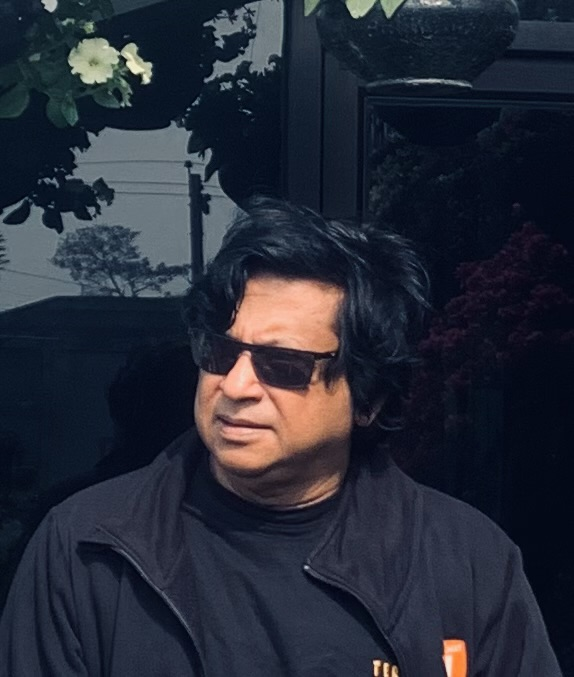
- Hossain in 2024
- Education: University of Dhaka, Tokyo Metropolitan University
- Scientific career
- Fields: Biochemistry, Food and Health Sciences

Hossain Uddin Shekhar is a Bangladeshi biochemist known for his work in areas such as thalassemia carrier detection, cancer biomarker detection, and oxidative stress. He is a professor in the department of Biochemistry and Molecular Biology at the University of Dhaka, and currently serving as the Founding Vice Chancellor of Shariatpur Agriculture University (SHAU). He served as the Vice Chancellor of Gopalganj Science and Technology University (GSTU) prior to his appointment as the Vice Chancellor of Shariatpur Agricultural University.

== Education ==
Hossain earned his bachelor's and master's degrees in biochemistry from the University of Dhaka. He earned his PhD in 2003 from Tokyo Metropolitan University and completed his post-doctoral work in 2010 at United Nations University.

== Career ==
Hossain joined the department of biochemistry in Dhaka University as a lecturer in 1992. He became an assistant professor in 1995, an associate professor in 2004, and a professor in 2007.

Hossain has numerous publications in Q1 journals. He is also a member of the editorial boards of PLOS One, Frontiers in Molecular Biosciences, BioMed Research International, and Springer Nature.

In 2004, he jointly published a paper on gene-deficient yeast with Nobel Laureate Yoshinori Ohsumi.

Under his leadership, the Consumers Association of Bangladesh (CAB) conducted a two-year research project on the institutionalization of healthy street food.

Presently, Hossain is the president of VOCTA (Voluntary Consumers Training and Awareness Society) and the general secretary of BSBMB (Bangladesh Society for Biochemistry and Molecular Biology). He is also serving as the chief editor of Bioresearch Communications (BRC), and as an editorial board member of DUJBS (Dhaka University Journal of Biological Sciences).

== Awards ==
- He was honored for his outstanding contributions to research at the “Distinguished Scholar Recognition 2026” ceremony held by the University of Dhaka.

== Books ==
In 2012, Hossain published his first book, Functional Foods From Bangladesh. He has also co-edited books for publishers such as Springer Nature, Wiley & Sons, Frontiers in Molecular Biosciences, and Nova Science Publishers.
