= Shahid Ullah Khandaker =

Shahid Ullah Khandaker is the former senior secretary of the Ministry of Housing and Public Works. He was the development program coordinator for the constituency of Prime Minister Sheikh Hasina responsible for development work in her constituency Gopalganj-3.

== Early life ==
Khandaker was born on 23 September 1948 in Kotalipara Upazila, Gopalganj.

== Career ==
Khandaker joined the 5th batch of Bangladesh Civil Service in 1986 as an admin cadre.

Khandaker was promoted to Secretary in 2015. He was appointed the secretary of the Ministry of Housing and Public Works on 15 March 2016. He was made president of the Dr Muhammad Shahidullah Hall Alumni Association in July 2017.

In September 2021, Khandaker's tenure was extended for one year as secretary of the Ministry of Housing and Public Works.

On 29 September 2022, Khandaker retired from government service and was replaced by Kazi Wasi Uddin as secretary. Prime Minister Sheikh Hasina appointed him as her special representative to her constituency responsible for development activities in Gopalganj-3. He replaced Sheikh Mohammad Abdullah, who had died from COVID-19 In January 2024, he visited Hindu families in Gopalganj-3 who were attacked by a mob after a Hindu man posted derogatory comments about the Islamic prophet Mohammad. He organized the re-elected campaign of Prime Minister Sheikh Hasina for the 2024 Bangladeshi general election. In March 2024, he distributed aid to victims of Ghagar Bazar fire on behalf of Prime Minister Sheikh Hasina.

After the fall of the Sheikh Hasina-led Awami League government, a murder case was filed against Khandaker by Bangladesh Nationalist Party politician Mohammad Zaman Hossain Khan over the death of a protester in July 2024. He was sentenced to 18 years to prison in a case over allocation of plots in Purbachal to Sheikh Hasina and her family members.
