= Rafiq Uddin Ahmed (politician) =

Bangladeshi politician

Member of Bangladesh Parliament
- In office 1973–1976
- Succeeded by: Nurul Haque

Personal details
- Political party: Bangladesh Awami League

Rafiq Uddin Ahmed is a Bangladesh Awami League politician and a former member of parliament for Dhaka-9.

== Career ==
Ahmed was elected to parliament from Dhaka-9 as a Bangladesh Awami League candidate in 1973 and served in the 1st Jatiya Sangsad.
