= SM Zakaria =

SM Zakaria (died: 12 November 2024) was a Bangladeshi former election commissioner who served the commission from 16 January 2006 to 31 January 2007.

== Biography ==
SM Zakaria was born in Kazipara in Brahmanbaria. He joined the election commission secretariat on 1 April 2002 and served as election secretary until 15 January 2006. On 16 January 2006, he was appointed as a commissioner of the Bangladesh Election Commission, and served until 31 January 2007.

He died at United Hospital in the capital Dhaka on 12 November 2024. He was buried at his ancestral home in Brahmanbaria.

== Controversy ==
Zakaria had been engaged in a severe conflict with then chief election commissioner (CEC) MA Syed. He avoided meetings of the election commission for two years during Syed's tenure. Then CEC M A Syed requested the government on several occasions to withdraw Zakaria from the election commission secretariat and appoint a new secretary. However, the government did not respond to the request and Zakaria was given a one-year extension.

After becoming an election commissioner on 15 January 2006, he served for one year. He then had to resign along with the entire commission on 31 January 2007.
