= Gopalganj District, Bangladesh =

Gopalganj District গোপালগঞ্জ জেলা
- District of Bangladesh
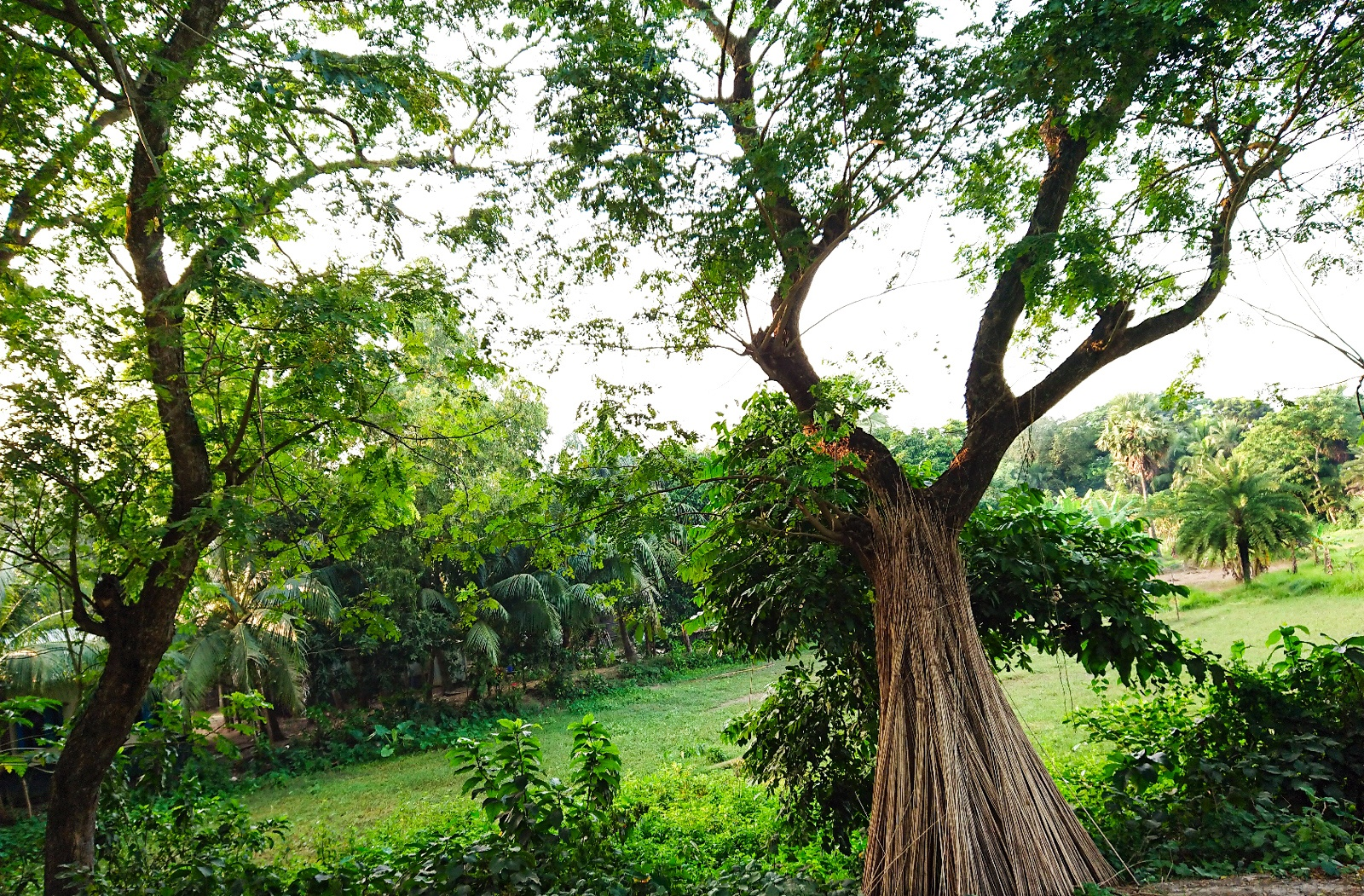
- Fields in Gopalganj district

- Location of Gopalganj District in Bangladesh
- Interactive map of Gopalganj District
- Coordinates: 23.20°N 89.80°E
- Country: Bangladesh
- Division: Dhaka
- Headquarters: Gopalganj

Government
  - Deputy Commissioner: Shahida Sultana

Area
  - Total: 1,468.74 km^{2} (567.08 sq mi)

Population (2022)
  - Total: 1,295,057
  - Density: 881.747/km^{2} (2,283.71/sq mi)
- Time zone: UTC+06:00 (BST)
- Postal code: 8100
- Area code: 0668
- ISO 3166 code: BD-17
- HDI (2023): 0.685 medium · 10th of 22
- Notable sport teams: Gopalganj SC
- Website: www.gopalganj.gov.bd

Gopalganj District (Bengali: গোপালগঞ্জ জেলা) is a district in Dhaka Division, Bangladesh. The district has 1,172,415 inhabitants and its surface area is 1,490 km^{2}. The district headquarters is also called Gopalganj. It is the home district of Bangabandhu Sheikh Mujibur Rahman, the founding President of Bangladesh. It is located on the bank of the Madhumati river and located at 23°00’47.67" N 89°49’21.41". It is bounded by Faridpur district on the North, Pirojpur and Bagerhat district on the South, and Barisal District on the East and Narail district on the West. Gopalganj is subdivided into five sub-districts (upazilas and thanas). This district has the highest percentage of Hindus among the districts of Bangladesh, which is about 30 percent.

== History ==
In 1800, Babu Preetoram Marh, Zamindar of Janbazar, Kolkata purchased Makimpur Pargana (in present days lies under the area of Gopalganj) for 19,000 taka only and became the landlord of the Pargana. Babu Rajachandra Das, the 2nd son of Preetoram Das was married to Rani Rasmoni of Mahishya caste on 4 April 1804. Landlord Rajachandra died only at 49 leaving his widowed wife Rani Rasmoni and three daughters on 9 June 1836. Padmamoni, the eldest daughter of Rani Rasmoni, married Ramchandra and gave birth to seven children; Mahendranath, Ganeshchandra, and five others. Mahendranath, eldest son of Padmamoni and Ramchandra died at a premature age and Ganeshchandra (second son) became landlord of the estate. To show respect to Rani Rasmoni, the tenants of Khatra estate changed the name of Rajganj Bajar to Gopalganj (Gopal from Nabo Gopal and Ganj from Ranjganj) following the name of Nabo Gopal, son of Ganeshchandra and great-grandson of Rani Rasmoni.

This area was under the southern part of ancient Bengal called Vanga. Around 300 BC here in Kotalipara was the capital of Gangaridai dynasty. Gangaridai was one of the powerful kingdom of Indian subcontinent. It was described by the Greek traveller Megasthenes in his work Indica. During Sultanate and Mughal period several Hindu kings ruled the area. In 1713, Muksudpur Upazila was part of Jessore district while the rest of Gopalganj was part of Dhaka - Jalalpur District. Muksedpur was later transferred to Faridpur district in 1807. Gopalganj Sadar and Kotalipara was part of Jalalpur Porgona of Faridpur district. The Chandana (now Modhumoti) river was the borderline for Jessore and Dhaka - Jalalpur districts in 1812. Gopalganj - Madaripur was a large water body back then where maritime robbery was a regular activity. Thus, Madaripur Mohakuma or Sub-division was separated in 1854 from Bakergonj District.

Later, Gopalganj emerged as a police station in 1872 under the Madaripur Mohakuma or Sub-division vide Calcutta Gazette of 1870. In 1873, Madaripur Mohakuma or Sub-division was transferred to Faridpur district from Bakergonj district. Later in 1909, it was separated from the Madaripur Mohakuma of Bakergonj district to form a new Gopalganj Mohhakuma or sub-division. Later, Muksudpur Police Station of Faridpur district joined Gopalganj and Kotalipara police stations of Gopalganj Mohakuma or sub-division of Faridpur district.

The first SDO (sub-divisional officer) was Mr. Suresh Chandra Sen. In 1910, the sub-divisional officer's bench court was transformed into a Criminal Court. In 1921, Gopalganj was elevated to township status which was inhabited by only 3,478 persons. 1925 saw the initiation of a Civil Court. In 1936, Muksudpur was split to form Kashiani police station.

Gopalganj Mohakuma or sub-division emerged as Gopalganj district on the 1st day of February in 1984. Mr. AFM Ehiya Chowdhury was the first District Commissioner of Gopalganj District.

In the same year, Tungipara was separated from the Sadar Upazila to form a new upazila named Tungipara upazila.

== Politics ==
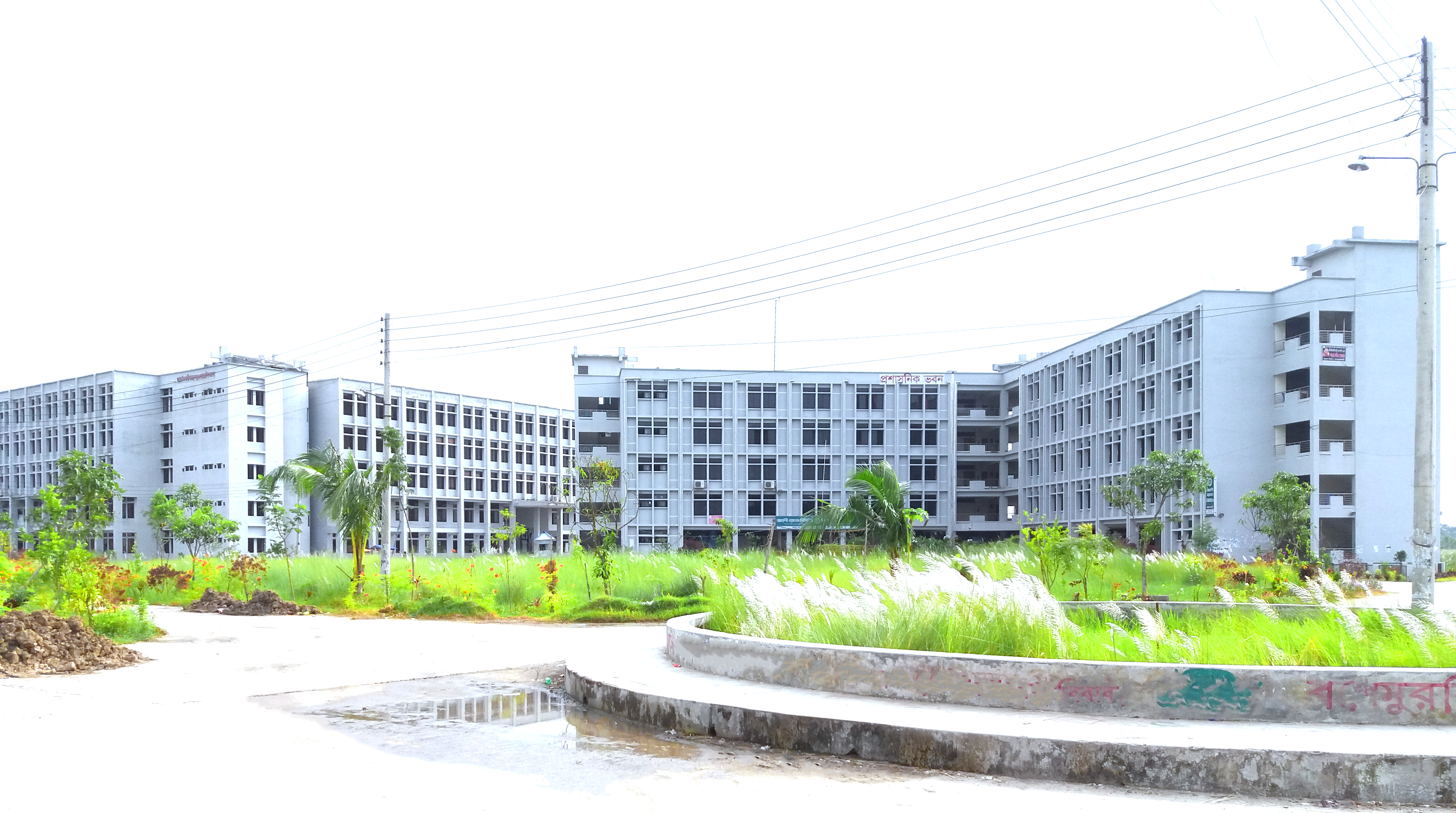
Gopalganj Science and Technology University

Gopalganj is closely linked to Bangladeshi politics, especially the Awami League. It is the birthplace of several notable political figures, including Sheikh Mujibur Rahman, the first President of Bangladesh, and his daughter Sheikh Hasina Wajed, the ousted Prime Minister of Bangladesh following the July Revolution. The district has a history of political activity and has been the site of political clashes in the past.

== Geography ==
- Rivers:
  - Gorai-Madhumati
  - Kaliganga
  - Hunda
  - Ghagore
  - Old Kumar rivers
  - Barashia River

=== Climate ===
Climate data for Gopalganj
Month	Jan	Feb	Mar	Apr	May	Jun	Jul	Aug	Sep	Oct	Nov	Dec	Year
Mean daily maximum °C (°F)	25.7 (78.3)	28.6 (83.5)	33 (91)	34.4 (93.9)	34.4 (93.9)	32 (90)	31.1 (88.0)	31.1 (88.0)	31.7 (89.1)	31.4 (88.5)	29.2 (84.6)	26.2 (79.2)	30.7 (87.3)
Mean daily minimum °C (°F)	11.9 (53.4)	14.4 (57.9)	19.5 (67.1)	23.3 (73.9)	24.8 (76.6)	25.5 (77.9)	25.6 (78.1)	25.8 (78.4)	25.6 (78.1)	23.8 (74.8)	18.5 (65.3)	13.3 (55.9)	21.0 (69.8)
Average precipitation mm (inches)	10 (0.4)	21 (0.8)	46 (1.8)	102 (4.0)	202 (8.0)	343 (13.5)	351 (13.8)	313 (12.3)	236 (9.3)	147 (5.8)	30 (1.2)	8 (0.3)	1,809 (71.2)

== Demographics ==
Historical population
Year	Pop.	±% p.a.
1974	845,640	—
1981	980,941	+2.14%
1991	1,060,791	+0.79%
2001	1,165,273	+0.94%
2011	1,172,415	+0.06%
2022	1,295,057	+0.91%

According to the 2022 Census of Bangladesh, Gopalganj District had 308,710 households and a population of 1,295,057 with an average 4.11 people per household. Among the population, 250,128 (19.31%) inhabitants were under 10 years of age. The population density was 882 people per km^{2}. Gopalganj District had a literacy rate (age 7 and over) of 79.84%, compared to the national average of 74.80%, and a sex ratio of 1,042 females per 1,000 males. Approximately, 20.01% of the population lived in urban areas. The ethnic population was 2,470.

Religions in Gopalganj District (2022)
Religion	Percent
Islam	72.10%
Hinduism	26.95%
Christianity	0.93%
Other or not stated	0.02%

Religion in present-day Gopalganj district
	1941 (Note: Gopalganj subdivision of Faridpur district)		1981		1991		2001		2011		2022	
Religion	Pop.	%	Pop.	%	Pop.	%	Pop.	%	Pop.	%	Pop.	%
Hinduism	346,729	55.57%	399,415	40.72%	372,625	35.13%	371,629	31.89%	353,794	30.18%	348,974	26.95%
Islam	268,233	42.99%	568,236	57.93%	674,807	63.62%	779,962	66.93%	805,115	68.67%	933,708	72.10%
Christianity	8,436	1.35%	12,559	1.28%	12,742	1.20%	13,401	1.15%	12,951	1.10%	12,050	0.93%
Others (Note: Including Jainism, Buddhism, Zoroastrianism, Judaism, Ad-Dharmis, or not stated)	565	0.09%	731	0.07%	617	0.05%	281	0.03%	555	0.05%	325	0.02%
Total Population	623,963	100%	980,941	100%	1,060,791	100%	1,165,273	100%	1,172,415	100%	1,295,057	100%

Today, the majority of the population consists of Bengali Muslims, although before the Partition, Hindus—most of whom were Namasudras—formed a clear majority in what is now Gopalganj District. The largest minority group is the Bengali Hindus, while Christians are the second largest. The Muslim population has steadily increased, while the Hindu population has steadily declined from nearly 400,000 (40% of the population in 1981) to under 350,000 today. The Christian population has remained relatively stable at about 13,000. Gopalganj has the highest percentage of Hindus of any district in Bangladesh. The district has 3058 mosques, 1288 temples, and 250 churches.

Hindus are a significant minority in Kotalipara Upazila, where they make up 47.10% of the population and form a majority in some areas. Although Gopalganj District is predominantly Muslim, it also contains areas with Hindu majorities.

== Administration ==
Gopalganj district consists of 5 sub-districts namely Gopalganj Sadar, Kotalipara, Kashiani, Muksudpur, and Tungipara; 4 municipalities namely Gopalganj (Class A), Tungipara (Class B), Kotalipara (Class B) & Muksudpur (Class C) and 68 union councils.

The main township is known as Gopalganj Sadar, which consists of 9 wards and 49 mahallas. Gopalganj municipality was constituted in 1972. It has an area of 8.59 km^{2} and a population of 40,987; male 53.27%, female 46.73% with a population density of 4,771 per km^{2}.

Administrator of District Council: Md. Atiar Rahman

Deputy Commissioner (DC): Kazi Mahbubul Alam

=== Subdivisions ===
1. Gopalganj Sadar Upazila
2. Kashiani Upazila
3. Kotalipara Upazila
4. Muksudpur Upazila
5. Tungipara Upazila

== Transport ==
Gopalganj has a unique transportation system. It is 5 hours away from the capital Dhaka by road due to traffic and distance. The journey time is set to reduce once the Padma Multipurpose Bridge is opened for all. Dhaka-Khulna Highway goes through Gopalganj to connect the neighbouring districts namely Barisal, Narail, Faridpur, Madaripur, Bagerhat and Khulna. Buses leave Dhaka for Gopalganj from both Gabtoli and Syedabad. Tungipara Express, Modhumoti, Dola, Bonoful leaves from Sayedabad for Gopalganj via Munshiganj, Mawa, Kawrakandi, Madaripur and Comfort Line, Sheba Green, Polash leaves from Gabtoli for Gopalganj via Manikganj, Paturia, Doulotdia, Rajbari and Faridpur.

Water transportation was the main medium of transport for the people of this district in the 1980s but the popularity of it has declined over time with the introduction of road connectivity. Now a launch operates between Sadarghat and Poisharhat. However, mechanical trawlers and boats still ply through the rivers, canals and vast water bodies.

An inoperable rail line is in place till Kashiani. The train service is also set to be reintroduced after the Padma Bridge is built.

On 14 April 1986, at least 92 people were killed in Gopalganj by the heaviest hailstones ever recorded, which were the size of grapefruits and weighed around 1 kg (2.2 lb) each.

== Education ==
The district has 21 colleges, 181 high schools, and 760 primary schools. Other notable educational institutions are as follows:

- Sheikh Sayera Khatun Medical College (SSKMC)
- Sheikh Sayera Khatun Nursing College
- Rabeya-Ali Girls School and College
- Gopalganj Science and Technology University (GSTU)
- Sheikh Lutfur Rahman Dental College (SLRDC)
- Sheikh Rehana Textile College
- Arpara Islamia High School
- Binapani Govt. Girls High School
- Bhatiapara High School
- Bangabandhu Poverty Reduction Training Complex
- Gaohardanga Madrasa
- Govt. Bangabandhu College
- Gopinathpur High School
- Gopalgonj Model Polytechnic Institute
- Government Nazrul College, Satpar, Gopalganj
- Gimadanga Ideal High School
- Hazi Laal Mia City College
- Sheikh Fazilatunnesa Govt. Mohila College
- S.M. Model Govt. High School
- S.K. Aliya Madrasah
- Sheikh Russel Destitute Children Training and Rehabilitation Center at Tungipara
- Sheikh Hasina Girls School and College
- Swarnakali High School
- Satpar Dinnnath Goyali Chandra High School
- Sabira - Rouf College
- Moulovi Abdul Hye Memorial School & College
- Paikkandi Panchapalli Madrasah
- Ulpur PC High School

== Notable people ==
- A. F. M. Abdul Moyeen, educationalist
- Abdullah Baqui
- Abul Hasan, poet
- Ainul Haque, footballer of Shadhin Bangla Football Team
- Akhter Mia
- Alvi Ahmed, film director
- Anis Ud Dowla, businessman and founder of ACI group of industries
- Asad Noor, exiled blogger
- Benazir Ahmed, former inspector general of Bangladesh Police
- Balai Dey, footballer for Pakistan and India
- Bhawani Sankar Biswas, politician
- Binoy Majumdar, poet
- Chowdhury Jafarullah Sharafat, sports commentator and journalist
- Chowdhury Nafeez Sarafat
- Elias Hossain, footballer
- Firoza Begum, artist
- Faruk Khan, politician and former minister
- Fayakuzzaman
- Habibur Rahman
- Ismat Kadir Gama
- Jaya Ahsan, leading Bangladeshi film and television actress
- Kazi Anowar Hossain, painter
- Kazi Wasi Uddin
- Khalid, singer
- Khandokar Mahbub Uddin Ahmad
- Khandokar Shams Uddin Ahmed
- Khondkar Ibrahim Khaled, Bangladeshi economist and banker
- Krishna Tithi Khan
- Kazi Hayat, director
- Kazi Maruf, actor
- Lily Rani Biswas, cricketer
- M. H. Khan Monjur
- MA Syed
- Marzuk Russell, poet, lyricist and notable television actor
- Md. Sharfuddin Ahmed
- Mizanur Rahman
- Mohabbat Jan Chowdhury, general and former minister
- Mohammad A. Quayum, academic
- Mohammad Ali Mia
- Mohammad Asafuddowla, musician
- Mohammed Nazibur Rahman
- Muhammad Aziz Khan, businessman, founder of Summit Group, and first Bangladeshi on the Forbes Billionaire list
- Monirul Islam, former head of Detective Branch
- Mufti Abdul Hannan, terrorist
- Nirmal Sen, journalist and politician
- Pramatha Ranjan Thakur, Indian politician
- Prince Mahmud, noted lyricist, composer and music-director
- R. C. Majumdar, historian and 4th Vice Chancellor of the University of Dhaka
- Ruhul Amin, Islamic scholar
- Samson H. Chowdhury, businessman, entrepreneur, founder of Square Group of Companies
- Sarbari Roy Choudhury, Indian artist
- Shahid Ullah Khandaker
- Shakib Khan, leading Dhallywood film-actor
- Shamsul Haque Faridpuri, Islamic scholar, educationist, and social reformer
- Shariff Enamul Kabir, academic.
- Sheikh Hasina, politician and former prime minister of Bangladesh
- Sheikh Kabir Hossain, businessman
- Sheikh Lutfar Rahman
- Sheikh Mohammed Abdullah, politician, lawyer
- Sheikh Mosharraf Hossain, politician
- Sheikh Mujibur Rahman, politician, revolutionary, statesman, president of Bangladesh
- Sheikh Rehana, politician
- Sheikh Selim, politician
- Shib Nath Roy, former ambassador
- Tipu Munshi, politician and former minister
- Wahiduzzaman
- Z. A. Morshed

== See also ==
- Upazilas of Bangladesh
- Districts of Bangladesh
- Divisions of Bangladesh
- Upazila
- Thana
- Administrative geography of Bangladesh
