= Mahmudul Hasan (Dhaka politician) =

Bangladeshi politician

Member of Bangladesh Parliament
- In office 1986–1988

Personal details
- Party: Jatiya Party (Ershad)

Mahmudul Hasan (Bengali: মাহমুদুল হাসান) is a Jatiya Party (Ershad) politician and a former member of parliament for Dhaka-9.

== Career ==
Hasan was elected to parliament from Dhaka-9 as a Jatiya Party candidate in 1986.
