= Khandokar Mahbub Uddin Ahmad =

Bangladeshi politician

- খন্দকার মাহবুব উদ্দিন আহমাদ

Member of Parliament
- In office 1st and 2nd
- In office 15 February 1996 – June 1996
- Preceded by: J. U. Sirker
- Succeeded by: Makbul Hossain
- In office 2001–2006
- Preceded by: Makbul Hossain
- Succeeded by: Saber Hossain Chowdhury

Personal details
- Born: 7 December 1925 Gopalganj
- Died: 1 March 2014 (aged 88) United Hospital, Dhaka, Bangladesh.
- Party: Bangladesh Nationalist Party
- Parent: Khandokar Shams Uddin Ahmed

Khandokar Mahbub Uddin Ahmad (1925–2014) was a prominent Bangladeshi lawyer, politician and former member of parliament from Dhaka-9.

== Birth and early life ==
Ahmad was born in the house of late Khandokar Shams Uddin Ahmed in Gopalganj District on 7 December 1925. He was a close friend of Sheikh Mujibur Rahman.

== Career ==
Ahmad was elected to parliament from Dhaka-9 as a Bangladesh Nationalist Party candidate in 2001 and served till 2006. He was a member of the Bangladesh Nationalist Party standing committee till 2008. He served two terms as the president of Supreme Court Bar Association.

== Death ==
Ahmad died on 1 March 2014 in United Hospital, Dhaka. He was buried at Azimpur Graveyard.
