= Karpara =

Coordinates: 24.8538°N 91.6870°E

Kor Para is a village situated in the Singer Kach area of Daulatpur Union, Bishwanath Upazila, Sylhet District, Bangladesh.
