= AFM Bahauddin Nasim =

Bangladeshi politician

- আ. ফ. ম. বাহাউদ্দিন নাছিম
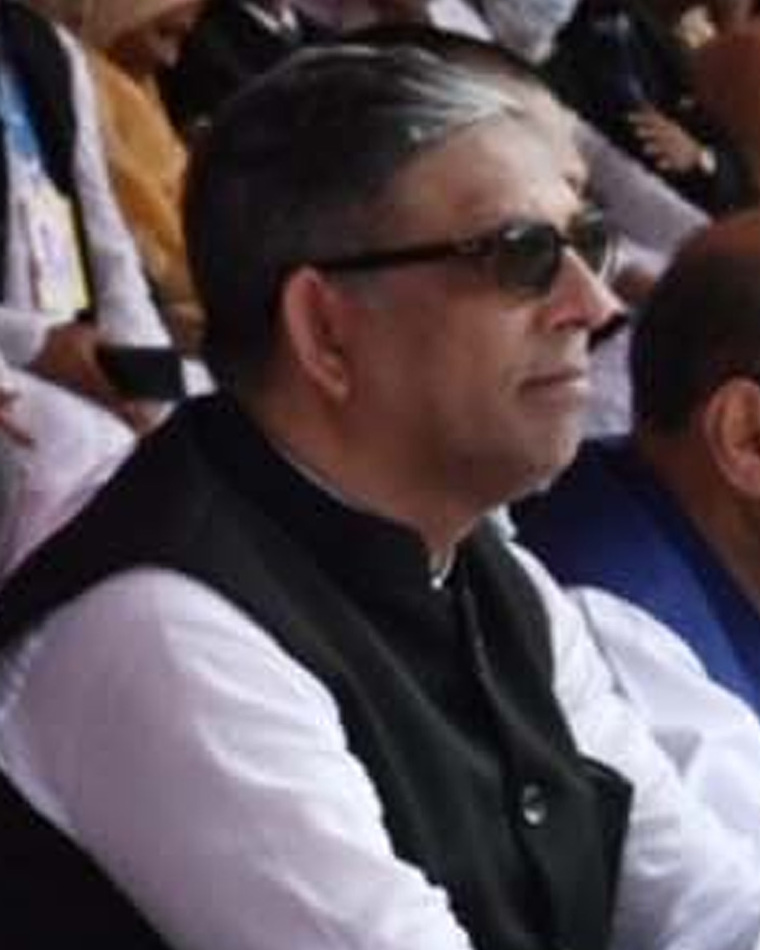
- Nasim in 2023

Member of the Bangladesh Parliament for Dhaka-8
- In office 30 January 2024 – 6 August 2024
- Preceded by: Rashed Khan Menon

Member of the Bangladesh Parliament for Madaripur-3
- In office 5 January 2014 – 29 December 2018
- Preceded by: Syed Abul Hossain
- Succeeded by: Abdus Sobhan Golap

Personal details
- Born: 11 November 1961 (age 64) Madaripur District, East Bengal, Dominion of Pakistan
- Party: Bangladesh Awami League
- Spouse: Sultana Shamima Chowdhury
- Children: 2
- Relatives: Sheikh Lutfar Rahman (granduncle); Sheikh family of Tungipara
- Education: Sher-e-Bangla Agricultural University

AFM Bahauddin Nasim is a Bangladeshi politician and current Joint General Secretary of the Bangladesh Awami League. He is a former Member of Parliament representing the Dhaka-8 constituency.

== Early life ==
Nasim has a Bachelor of Science degree from Sher-e-Bangla Agricultural University. His paternal grandmother was a sister of Sheikh Lutfar Rahman (father of Sheikh Mujibur Rahman), making Mujib his uncle and Sheikh Hasina his second cousin.

== Career ==
Nasim started his political career by joining the Bangladesh Chhatra League. He was president and secretary of the Sher-e-Bangla Agricultural University unit of the Bangladesh Chhatra League. In 1981, he became president of the Madaripur District unit of the Bangladesh Chhatra League. He was the president of the Bangladesh Awami Swechasebak League. He was an assistant personal secretary of Prime Minister Sheikh Hasina in the 1996-2001 period. He was elected to parliament in 2014 from Madaripur-3 as a Bangladesh Awami League candidate. In 2017, he was acquitted in a corruption case filed by the Anti-Corruption Commission. He was a member of the treasury bench of the Parliament of Bangladesh. He is now joint general secretary of the Awami League.

== Personal life ==
Nasim was born on 11 November 1961 in Madaripur, Faridpur district of East Pakistan. Nasim is married to Sultana Shamima Chowdhury.
