= Chowdhury Jafarullah Sharafat =

Bangladeshi sports commentator

- চৌধুরী জাফরউল্লাহ শারাফাত
- Born: 10 May; Gopalgonj
- Occupation: sports commentator

Chowdhury Jafarullah Sharafat (born 10 May) is a Bangladeshi sports commentator.

== Early life ==
Sharafat was born on May 10. He has two brothers and three sisters. His father's name is Sharafat Hossain Chowdhury.

== Career ==
Sharafat started his career when he was in class Nine by auditioning to Bangladesh Television in 1980. He made his debut as a commentator during Romania vs Indonesia match at President Gold Cup Football Tournament. He was inspired by Australian cricketer and commentator Richie Benaud. He served as a Chief Judge at Commentator Hunt competition in 2017.

Sharafat is the Independent Director of the Premier Bank Limited and also the member of the Audit Committee of Board of Directors of the Bank. He is one of the trustees of Canadian University of Bangladesh.

== Personal life ==
Sharafat is married to Syeda Gulshan Ara and the couple has twins. His younger brother is Chowdhury Nafeez Sarafat.
