= Gopalganj Science and Technology University =

Bangladeshi Public university in Gopalganj

- গোপালগঞ্জ বিজ্ঞান ও প্রযুক্তি বিশ্ববিদ্যালয়
- Official logo of GSTU
- Former names: Bangabandhu Sheikh Mujibur Rahman Science and Technology University (2011–2025)
- Motto: Learn, Think, Innovate
- Type: Public university
- Established: 2011; 15 years ago
- Academic affiliations: UGC, PCB
- Chancellor: President Mirza Fakhrul Islam Alamgir
- Vice-Chancellor: Md. Sohel Hassan
- Academic staff: 300
- Students: c. 10,000
- Location: Gopalganj, 8105, Bangladesh; 22.9661°N 89.8171°E
- Campus: 55 acres; 55 acres (0.22 km^{2})
- Language: English
- Website: www.gstu.edu.bd

Gopalganj Science and Technology University (Bengali: গোপালগঞ্জ বিজ্ঞান ও প্রযুক্তি বিশ্ববিদ্যালয়), abbreviated as GSTU, is a public university located in Gopalganj, Bangladesh in the division of Dhaka. It was established in 2011. Every year, around 1,505 students enroll in undergraduate programs.

== History ==
Plans for the creation of this university began in 1999. The then government initiated a plan to establish 12 science and technology universities in 12 large districts lacking such institutions. In the first phase, six development project proposals were prepared, with GSTU being one of the top priorities. On 15 November 1999, M. Khairul Alam Khan, a professor from the Department of Applied Physics and Electronics Engineering at Rajshahi University, was appointed as the project director and sent to Gopalganj.

The project director completed tasks including university selection, land acquisition of about 55 acres, and land preparation. On 8 July 2001, the GSTU Act was enacted, and on 13 July, the then prime minister Sheikh Hasina formally laid the foundation. On 14 July, Sheikh Hasina recommended that M. Khairul Alam Khan become the vice-chancellor, a recommendation approved by the president on 19 July.

Following the 2001 election, the four-party alliance government of Bangladesh Jamaat-e-Islami-Bangladesh Nationalist Party came to power and closed the project on 15 April 2002, leading Khan to return to his previous institution and the discharge of seven employees.

The Awami League won the ninth parliamentary elections held on 29 December 2008, and in November 2009, the project was revived. On 5 January 2010, Hasina reappointed M. Khairul Alam Khan as project director, and on 14 December 2010, he was appointed vice-chancellor for a four-year term.

On 16 January 2025, the interim government decided to rename 13 universities that were previously named after Sheikh family, to reflect their respective districts. As a result, Bangabandhu Sheikh Mujibur Rahman Science & Technology University in Gopalganj was renamed Gopalganj Science & Technology University.

== Administration ==
=== Chancellor ===
Mirza Fakhrul Islam Alamgir, President of Bangladesh

=== Vice-Chancellors ===
No.	Name	Term of office
1	M. Khairul Alam Khan	December 2010 – December 2014
2	Khondoker Md. Nasiruddin	February 2015 – September 2019
3	Md. Shahjahan (acting)	October 2019 – September 2020
4	A. Q. M. Mahbub	September 2020 – 20 August 2024
5	Hossain Uddin Shekhar	October 2024 – 19 July 2026
6	Md. Nazmus Sadat	19 July 2026 – 25 August 2026
7	Md. Sohel Hassan	25 August 2026 – present

== Faculties and departments ==
There are 31 departments under 9 faculties.

== Academics ==
=== Admission and total seats ===
GSTU enrolls undergraduate, graduate and postgraduate students. Applicants must pass the competitive admission test. Tests are arranged by each faculty under the authority of the admission council. The university enrolls 1505 undergraduates in every year.

Total seats at GSTU
Faculty	Department	Acronym	Seat
Faculty of Engineering	Computer Science and Engineering	CSE	40
Faculty of Engineering	Electrical and Electronic Engineering	EEE	40
Faculty of Engineering	Applied Chemistry and Chemical Engineering	ACCE	40
Faculty of Engineering	Civil Engineering	CE	40
Faculty of Engineering	Food Engineering	FE	40
Faculty of Engineering	Architecture	ARCH	35
Faculty of Science	Physics	PHY	40
Faculty of Science	Chemistry	CHEM	40
Faculty of Science	Mathematics	MATH	40
Faculty of Science	Statistics	STAT	40
Faculty of Science	Environmental Science and Disaster Management	ESDM	40
Faculty of Life Science	Pharmacy	PHR	40
Faculty of Life Science	Biotechnology and Genetic Engineering	BGE	40
Faculty of Life Science	Biochemistry and Molecular Biology	BMB	40
Faculty of Life Science	Botany	BOT	40
Faculty of Life Science	Psychology	PSY	40
Faculty of Agriculture	Agriculture	AGRI	40
Faculty of Agriculture	Fisheries and Marine Bioscience	FMB	40
Faculty of Animal Science And Veterinary Medicine	Animal Science and Veterinary Medicine	ASVM	40
Faculty of Arts	English	ENG	50
Faculty of Arts	Bangla	BAN	50
Faculty of Arts	History	HIS	50
Faculty of Social Science	Economics	ECO	60
Faculty of Social Science	Sociology	SOC	60
Faculty of Social Science	Public Administration	PAD	60
Faculty of Social Science	International Relations	IR	60
Faculty of Social Science	Political Science	PS	60
Faculty of Business Studies	Management Studies	MGT	50
Faculty of Business Studies	Accounting and Information System	AIS	50
Faculty of Business Studies	Marketing	MKT	50
Faculty of Business Studies	Finance and Banking	FIN	50
Faculty of Business Studies	Tourism and Hospitality Management	THM	50
Faculty of Law	Law	LAW	50

== Campus ==
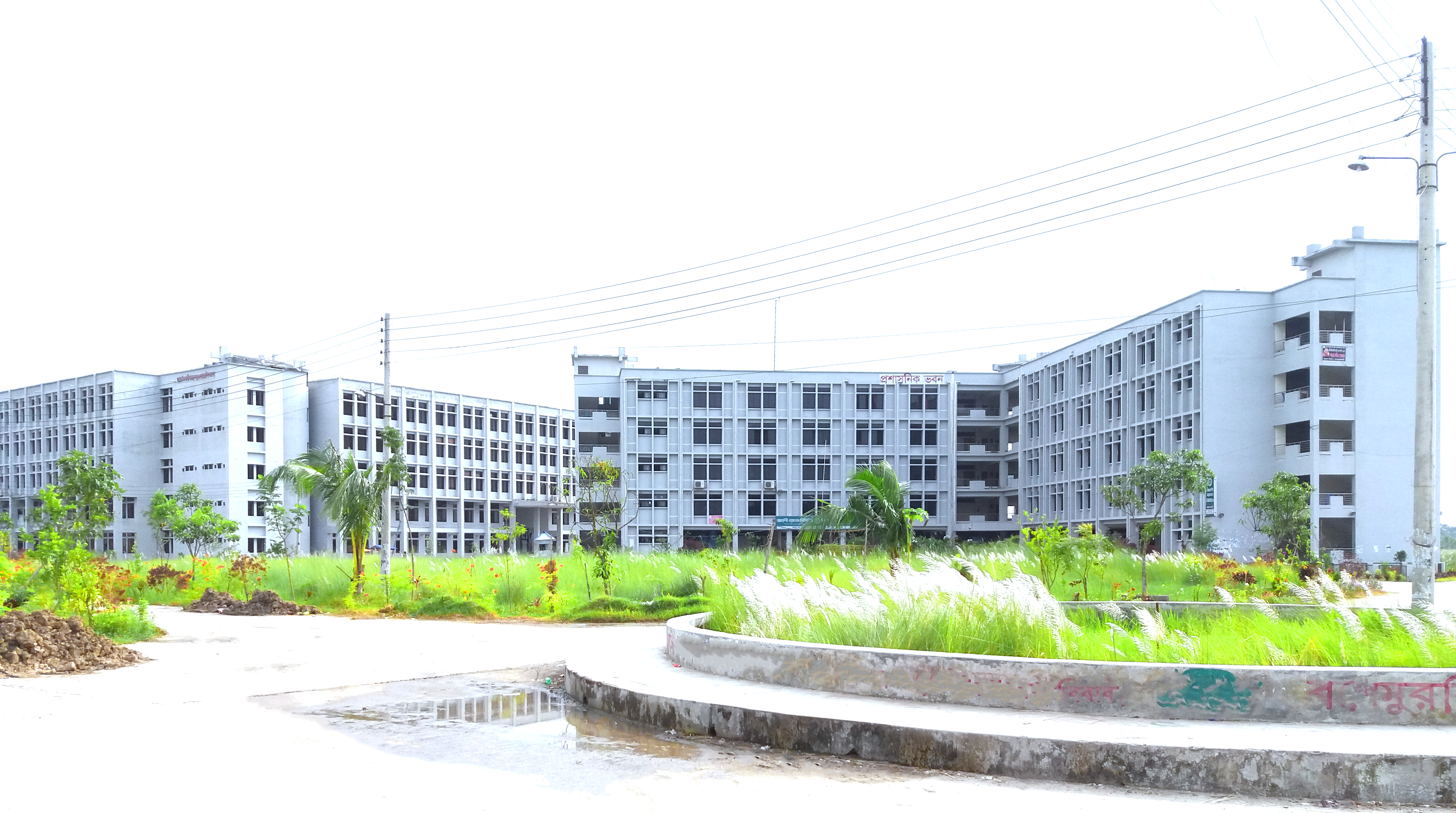
Gopalganj Science and Technology University, Gopalganj

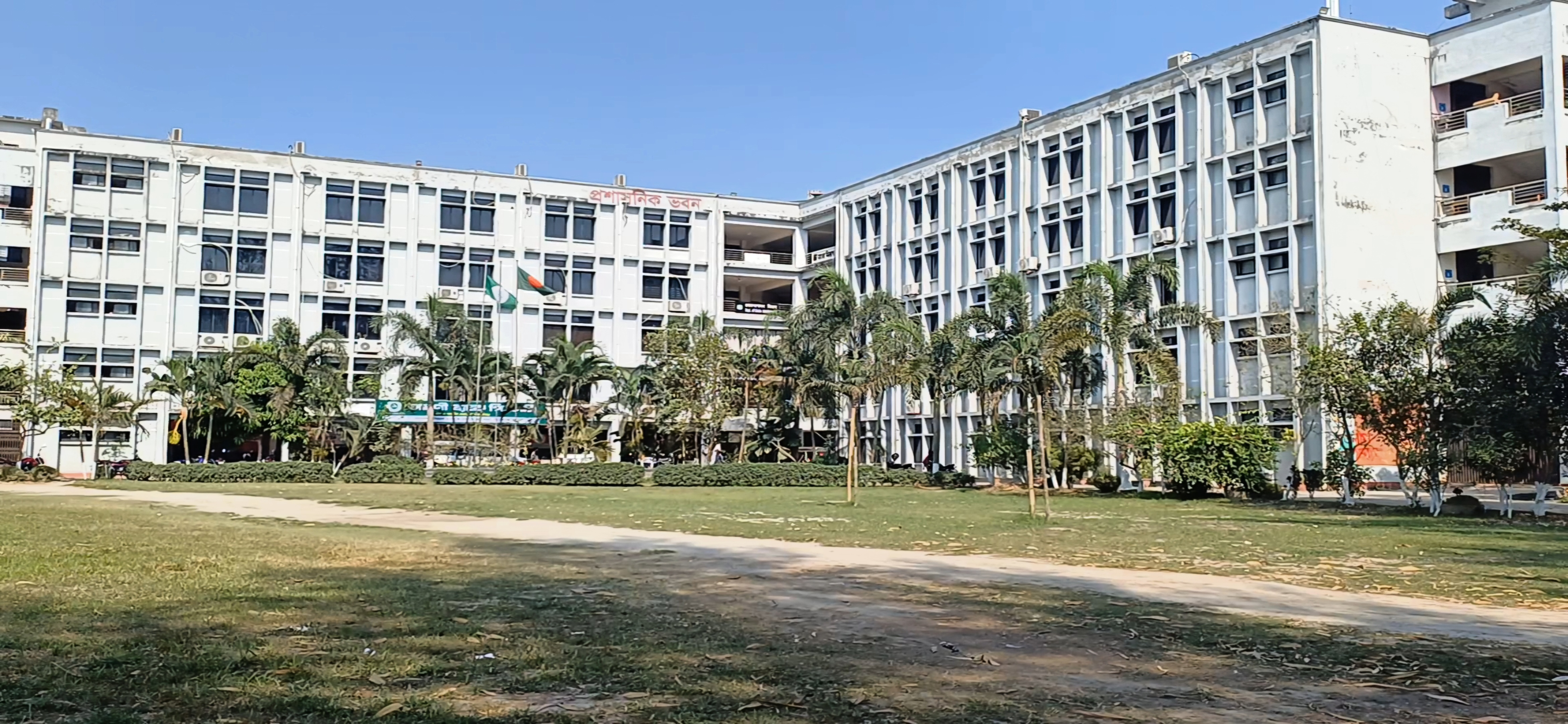
Administrative Building of GSTU

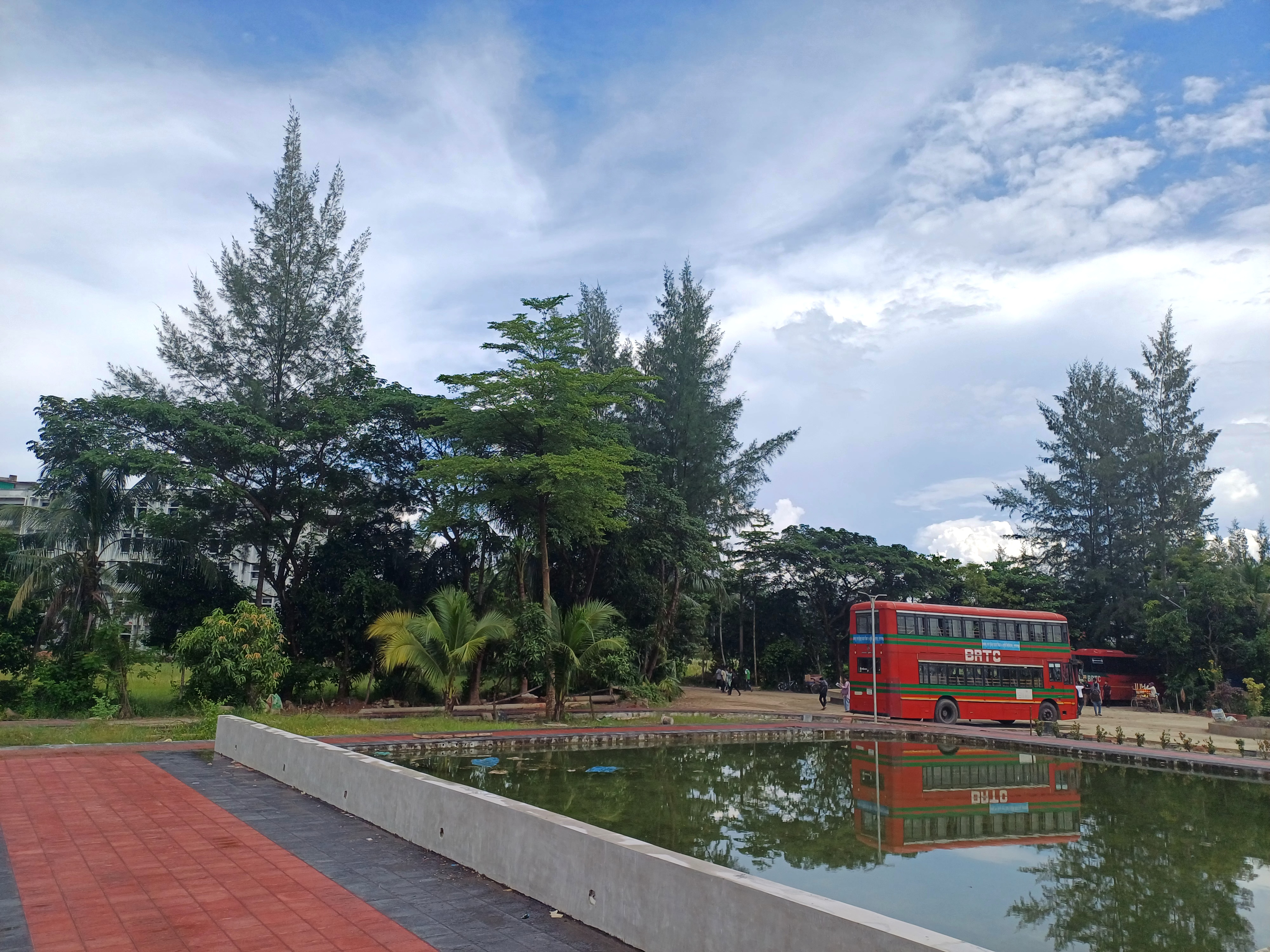
A serene view of the red BRTC bus at Gopalganj Science and Technology University, beautifully reflected in the campus pond.

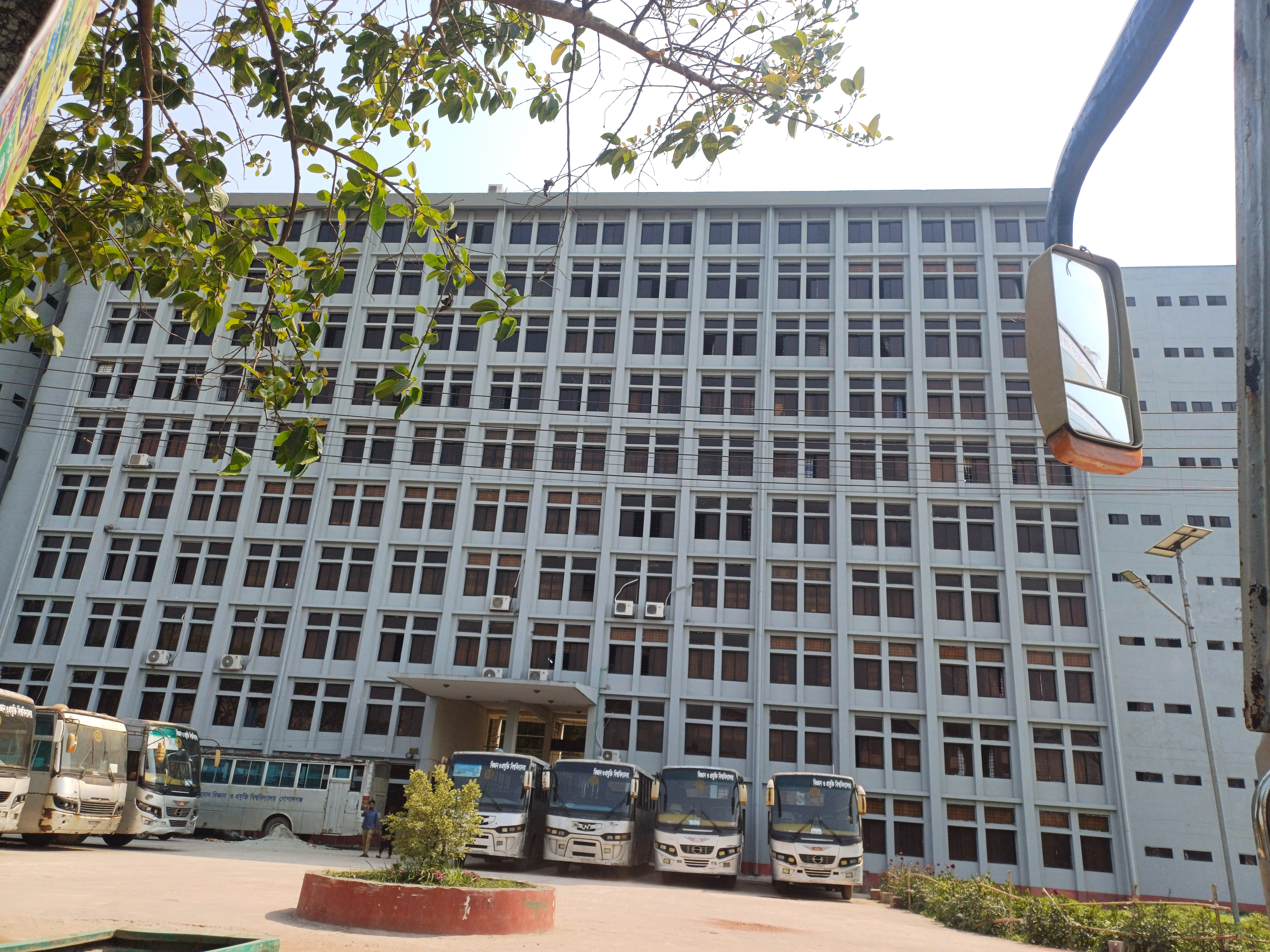
Academic Building of Gopalganj Science and Technology University with University Buses

The campus is situated in Gobra, Gopalganj. The main campus consists of five halls for students, the central library, an academic building, and an administrative building,medical center, , veterinary teaching hospital

=== Library ===
Ekushee February Library Center is the central library. At present it is two-storied (four-storied building) 1100 sq.m. In the northern part of the campus it is located with beautiful design. It was inaugurated on 21 February 2014. Its construction cost is 2 crore 46 lakh 74 thousand taka. It has a collection of books, journals and newspapers. The library is open during academic hours (Generally from 9:00 A.M to 8:00 P.M)

=== Residential student halls ===
Campus hosts five residential halls, each of which has five-stories with a capacity of 250 students. The halls are:

For boys

- Bijoy Debash Hall
- Swadhinata Debash Hall
- Shaheed Titumir Hall

For girls

- Banalata Hall
- Aparajita Hall
