= Bangabandhu Memorial Trust =

Trust in Bangladesh

Bangabandhu Memorial Trust is a trust in Bangladesh that was created to remember Sheikh Mujibur Rahman, the founding president of Bangladesh. His daughter and former Prime Minister Sheikh Hasina is the chair of the trust.

== History ==
On 11 April 1994, Sheikh Hasina established the Bangabandhu Memorial Trust. On 6 September 1994, Hasina handed over the deed of Bangabandhu Bhaban, the personal residence to Bangabandhu Memorial Trust. The trust turned Bangabandhu Bhaban in to a museum, Bangabandhu Memorial Museum. The first head of the museum was A. F. Salahuddin Ahmed. After Ahmed died, Hashem Khan took over as the head of the museum. The trust established the Sheikh Fazilatunnessa Mujib Memorial KPJ Specialized Hospital, named after Mujibur Rahman's wife Fazilatunnesa.

On 17 May 2017, a consortium of banks donated 1360 million Bangladeshi taka ($16.7M as of 2017) to the trust along with Prime Minister’s Education Assistance Trust and Shuchona Foundation. On 6 January 2020, Standard Bank donated 100 million taka to the trust on the occasion of Mujib Year. Five other banks also donated large amounts to the trust on occasion of Mujib Year. The Ministry of Education ordered the nationalization of 15 colleges named after Sheikh Mujibur Rahman and his family members after the trust and trust chairperson Hasina approved the nationalization as Prime Minister.

After the Sheikh Hasina-led Awami League government fell, the new regime led by Muhammad Yunus imposed income tax on the trust revoking its tax-exempt status. At the same the National Board of Revenue revoked tax-exempt status of Shurer Dhara, founded by Rezwana Choudhury Bannya; Lalit Mohan Dhanbati Memorial Foundation; Wadud Bhuyan Scholarship Trust; the Centre for Research and Information, and the President Abdul Hamid Foundation. The Bangabandhu Memorial Museum, managed by the trust, was destroyed in February 2025 as part of Bulldozer March. The Bangladesh Financial Intelligence Unit began an investigation into the trust.
