= Sydenham Institute of Management Studies, Research and Entrepreneurship Education =

Management institute under Mumbai University

- Motto: 'Samudyogo hi vishvajita"
- Motto in English: Diligent Efforts Conquer the World
- Type: Education and Research Institution
- Established: 1983; 43 years ago
- Academic affiliations: University of Mumbai
- Director: Dr. Shriniwas S. Dhure
- Location: Mumbai, Maharashtra, India
- Website: www.simsree.org

Sydenham Institute of Management Studies, Research and Entrepreneurship Education (SIMSREE) is a management institute in India under the aegis of the University of Mumbai. It was named after the then-governor of Bombay, Lord Sydenham of Combe in 1913. He was an early propoent in the spread of commerce-based vocational courses in India. Thus, Sydenham College became the oldest degree awarding institution in commerce. SIMSREE was established in 1983. K. S. Aiyar acted as first honorary principal of college. It was only in 1941, twenty-eight years after the establishment of Sydenham college, that any other institutions started offering courses in the subject.

== History ==
SIMSREE's parent institute, Sydenham College of Commerce and Economics is one of the most renowned commerce colleges in India. Established in October 1913, Sydenham College, commenced its journey as the first college of commerce in Asia. It was named after the then-governor of Bombay, Lord Sydenham of Combe, who was an early proponent in the spread of commerce-based vocational courses in India. Thus, Sydenham College became the oldest degree-awarding institution in commerce. SIMSREE was established in 1983. K. S. Aiyar acted as first honorary principal of the college. In 1941, twenty-eight years after the establishment of Sydenham College, other institutes started offering courses in the subject.

== Programmes ==
Full Time Courses

- Masters in Management Studies (MMS)

Masters in Management Studies is the flagship course of SIMSREE. It is a two-year full-time post-graduate degree course in management. Started as early as 1983, the institute offers specializations in the second year of the MMS course. The title of the programme as MMS, instead of the usual MBA, is to emphasise that the principles and practices of management studies are applicable to all types of organisation and not only to business organisations.

Students can specialize in:

1) Finance 2) Marketing 3) Personnel (HR) 4) Operations 5) Systems

- Masters of Science in Finance (M.Sc Finance)

The M.Sc. Finance program of Sydenham Institute of Management Studies, Research and Entrepreneurship Education (SIMSREE) is a two-year full time post graduate degree course, designed to equip students with the expertise and strategic acumen required to navigate the complex world of finance. A unique aspect of this program is its alignment with the globally recognized CERTIFIED FINANCIAL PLANNER® Certification awarded by FPSB India. This ensures that graduates are not only well-prepared for professional challenges but are also positioned to achieve a prestigious certification that is highly regarded in the financial services industry worldwide.

Part Time Courses

- Master's in Financial Management (MFM) - 3 years
- Master's in Marketing Management (MMM) - 3 years

Doctor of Philosophy (PhD)

The specialisation of PhD can be done in management related subjects like Marketing, Finance, Human Resource and Operations.

== Notable alumni ==
- Ashish Bhasin - Chairman & CEO, South Asia Dentsu Aegis Network & Chairman, Posterscope & Pslive – Asia Pacific
- Neeraj Roy - CEO & MD, Bollywood Hungama
- Nischal Khorana - Senior Director, ICT Practice, Asia Pacific - Frost & Sullivan Asia-Pacific
- Sanjay Behl - CEO and Executive Director, Greaves Electric Mobility
- Shyam Sutaria - CEO, Emami
- Govan Dhananjayan - CEO, UTV Motion Pictures
- Sanjay Chandel- CEO & MD, Indiabulls
- Ashwin Yerdi - COO, Capgemini
- Sameer Anjaria - COO, Bharti Airtel
- Sanjay Apte - MD, JPMorgan Chase
- Munawwar Shah - AVP, Deutsche Bank
- Prashanth Rathi - Senior Vice President, Bank of America
- Parimal Shah - Vice President and Market Director, Axis Bank
- Abhay Lonkar- Director- Marketing & Sales, Abbott Laboratories
- Ashwini Kapila - Director, Barclays
- Dharmesh Sodah - Director, World Gold Council
