= Sajeeb Wazed Joy =

Bangladeshi politician and businessman (born 1971)

- সজীব ওয়াজেদ জয়
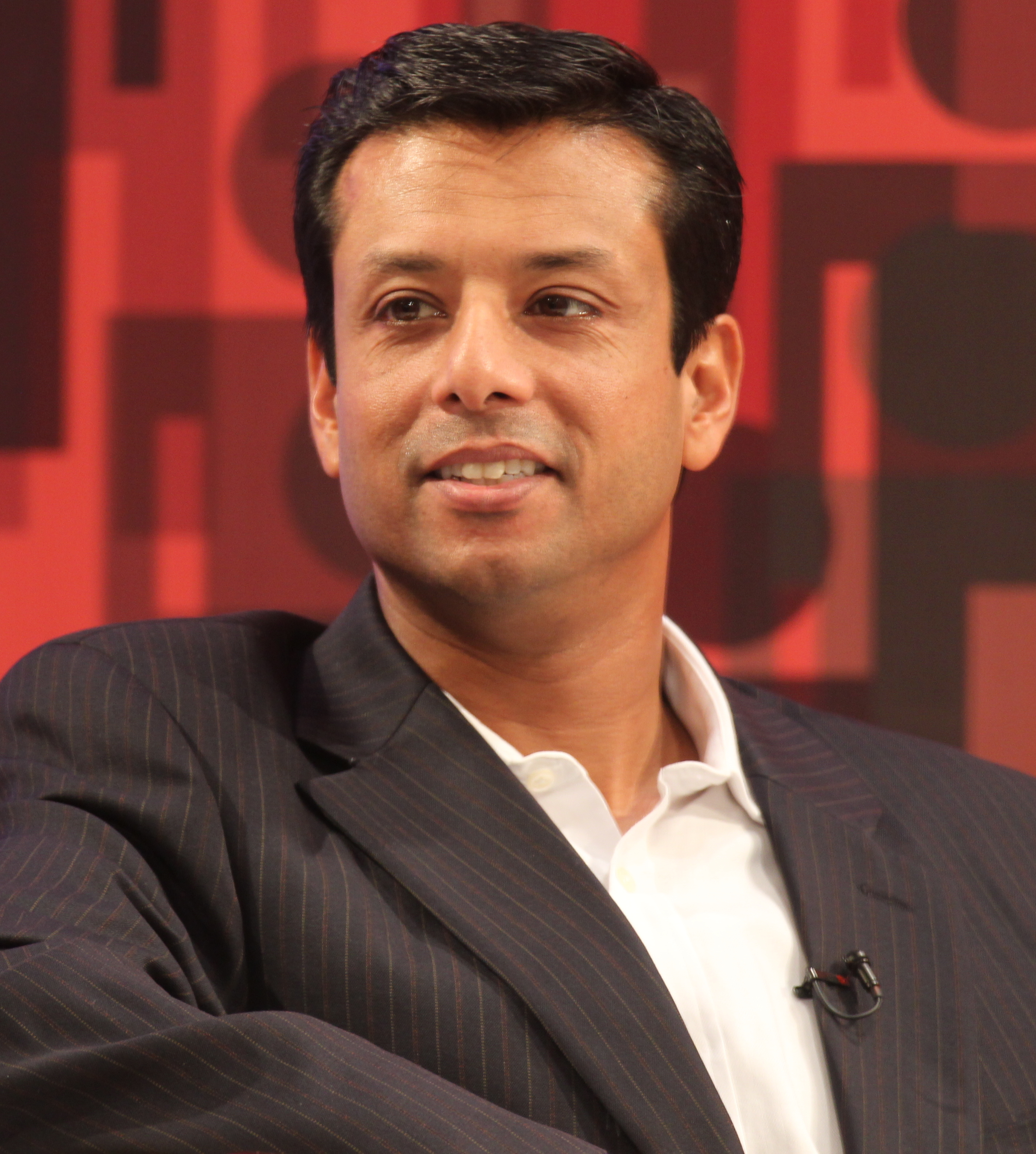
- Sajeeb in 2014

Advisor to the Prime Minister of Bangladesh on Information and Communication Technology Affairs
- In office 20 November 2014 – 5 August 2024
- Prime Minister: Sheikh Hasina
- Preceded by: office established
- Succeeded by: Faiz Ahmad Taiyeb

Personal details
- Born: Sajeeb Ahmed Wazed Joy; 27 July 1971 (age 55) Dacca, East Pakistan
- Citizenship: Bangladesh; United States
- Party: Bangladesh Awami League
- Spouse: Kristine Overmire (m. 2002; div. 2022)
- Children: 1
- Parents: M. A. Wazed Miah (father); Sheikh Hasina (mother)
- Relatives: Sheikh Mujibur Rahman (grandfather); Sheikh Fazilatunnesa Mujib (grandmother); Saima Wazed (sister)
- Education: Bangalore University; University of Texas, Arlington (BS); Harvard University (MPA)

Sajeeb Ahmed Wazed Joy (Note: Bengali: সজীব আহমেদ ওয়াজেদ জয়;) (born 27 July 1971) is a Bangladeshi-American businessman and politician. He is a member of the Bangladesh Awami League and served as an advisor to his mother, former Prime Minister of Bangladesh Sheikh Hasina, on information and communication technology affairs. He has been named in several corruption cases filed during the tenure of the interim government of Muhammad Yunus of Bangladesh.

== Early life and education ==
Wazed was born in Dhaka during the Bangladesh Liberation War on 27 July 1971. His parents are Dr. M. A. Wazed Miah and Sheikh Hasina Wazed. His father was a nuclear scientist. In August 1975, his grandparents and uncles were assassinated during a military coup in Bangladesh; he and his mother, father, and aunt survived as they were visiting West Germany. The family was barred by the military regime from entering the country until 1981. After returning to Bangladesh in 1981, his mother assumed the presidency of the Awami League and spearheaded the campaign for the restoration of democracy, along with her arch-rival Khaleda Zia. Wazed attended boarding school in India, including St. Joseph's College in Nainital and Kodaikanal International School in Palani Hills, Tamil Nadu. He studied computer science at the University of Bangalore, then transferred to the University of Texas at Arlington in the United States, where he graduated with a B.S. in computer engineering. Subsequently, Wazed attended Harvard Kennedy School at Harvard University, where he completed his Master of Public Administration.

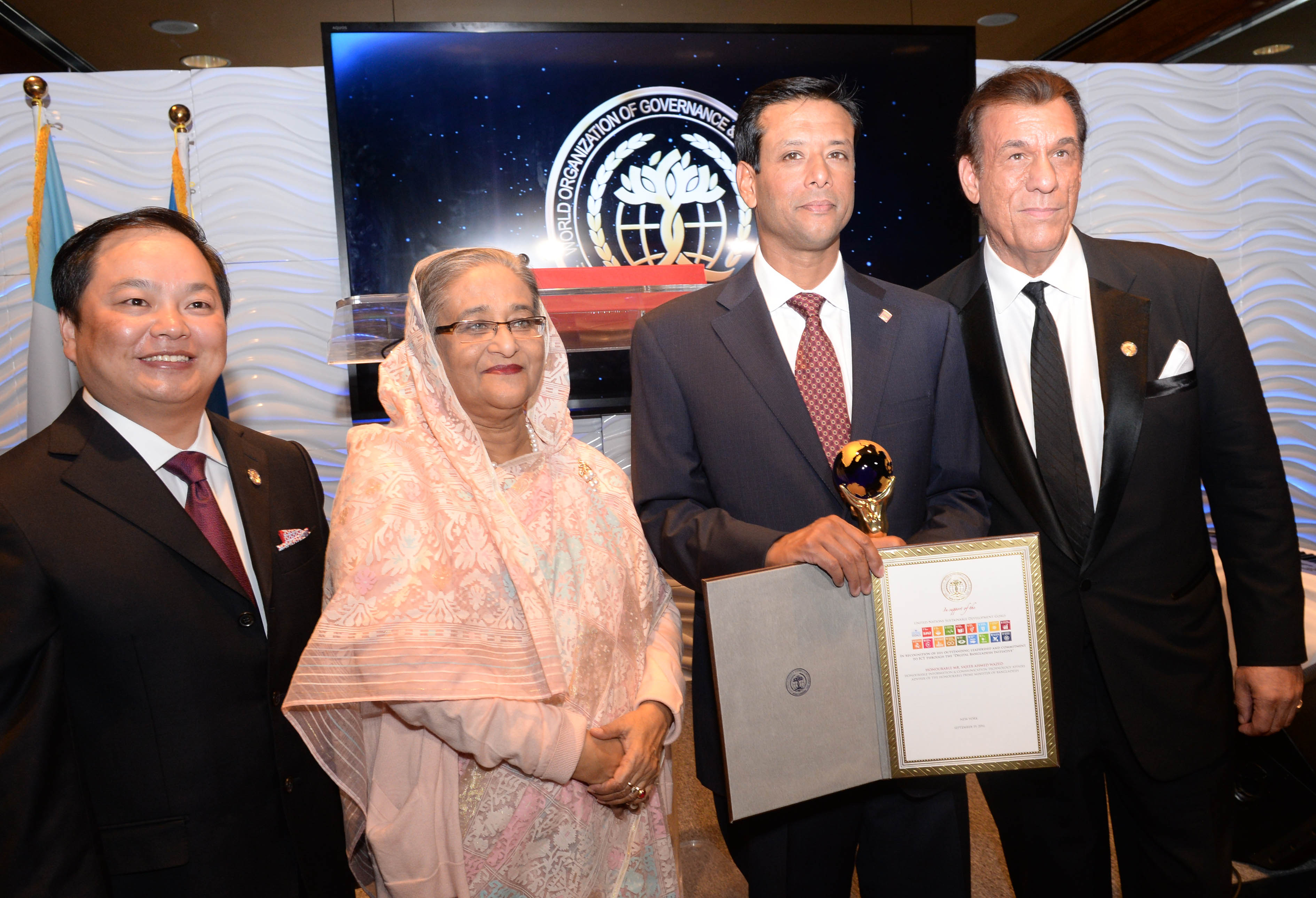
Joy with his mother, Sheikh Hasina (2016)

== Personal life ==
Wazed was settled in the United States for over two decades. He married Kristine Ann Overmire in 2002. They have a daughter. Their house is in Falls Church, Virginia. Since 2009, Wazed has divided his time between Bangladesh and the United States.

Given the assassination of Sheikh Mujibur Rahman and his family in 1975, 19 later attempts to assassinate Sheikh Hasina, and the very high security risk towards the immediate Mujib family members, in 2015 Sajeeb was given lifelong protection by the government of Bangladesh through the Special Security Force. The government also announced free utility for life for him and his family. On 29 August 2024, the interim government decided to cancel this law. Then on 9 September 2024, an ordinance was issued repealing this law. On 13 January 2025, in a part of a Facebook post, he said he and Kristine "are no longer married", and they had "separated almost three years ago and are divorced." He became a United States citizen in May 2025.

== Career ==
Wazed is regarded as the mastermind of the Digital Bangladesh initiative and promoting the Vision 2021 manifesto of the Awami League. Wazed was listed by the World Economic Forum as one of its Young Global Leaders. Wazed was also a lobbyist and columnist on behalf of the Bangladeshi government during the Hasina regime.

In 2007, a military-backed caretaker government headed by economist and civil servant Fakhruddin Ahmed grabbed power in the wake of the 2006-2008 political crisis, following the failure of the Iajuddin Ahmed-led caretaker government. The 'Minus Two' formula was put in place, not only to get rid of the former prime minister Khaleda Zia, but also Sajeeb Wazed's mother, the then Leader of the Opposition Sheikh Hasina. After his mother's arrest, Wazed worked to secure her release.

In February 2010 he became a primary member of the Rangpur District (the ancestral home district of his late father) of the political party Awami League. He joined as a voluntary and unpaid advisor to the prime minister, Sheikh Hasina.

Wazed pledged to transform Bangladesh's IT industry into the country's largest export sector, but critics say he has achieved little towards that end. Wazed has accused the editor of The Daily Star, the country's highest circulation English daily, of sedition; and a pro-opposition journalist of attempted murder. In 2017 Wazed has also had conflicts with Nobel laureate Muhammad Yunus and refused to publicly denounce Islamic extremists for the murder of Bangladeshi atheists, in order to avoid alienating the country's conservative clergy, despite professing himself as a secularist.

In 2024, after the fall of Sheikh Hasina, Wazed told the BBC that his mother would not return to politics. He later backtracked on that statement and told Reuters that she had not gotten the time to properly resign and that the formation of the interim government could be legally challenged. In 2025, Wazed asked India to ensure that fresh elections were to be held within 90 days. In a video posted on his verified Facebook page, Wazed also called on supporters to pay homage to his grandfather, Sheikh Mujibur Rahman, on 15 August, the anniversary of his assassination. He criticised the burning down of Sheikh Mujib's historic residence.

In November 2025, Wazed was sentenced to 5 years in jail for the Purbachal scam cases.

== Public life ==
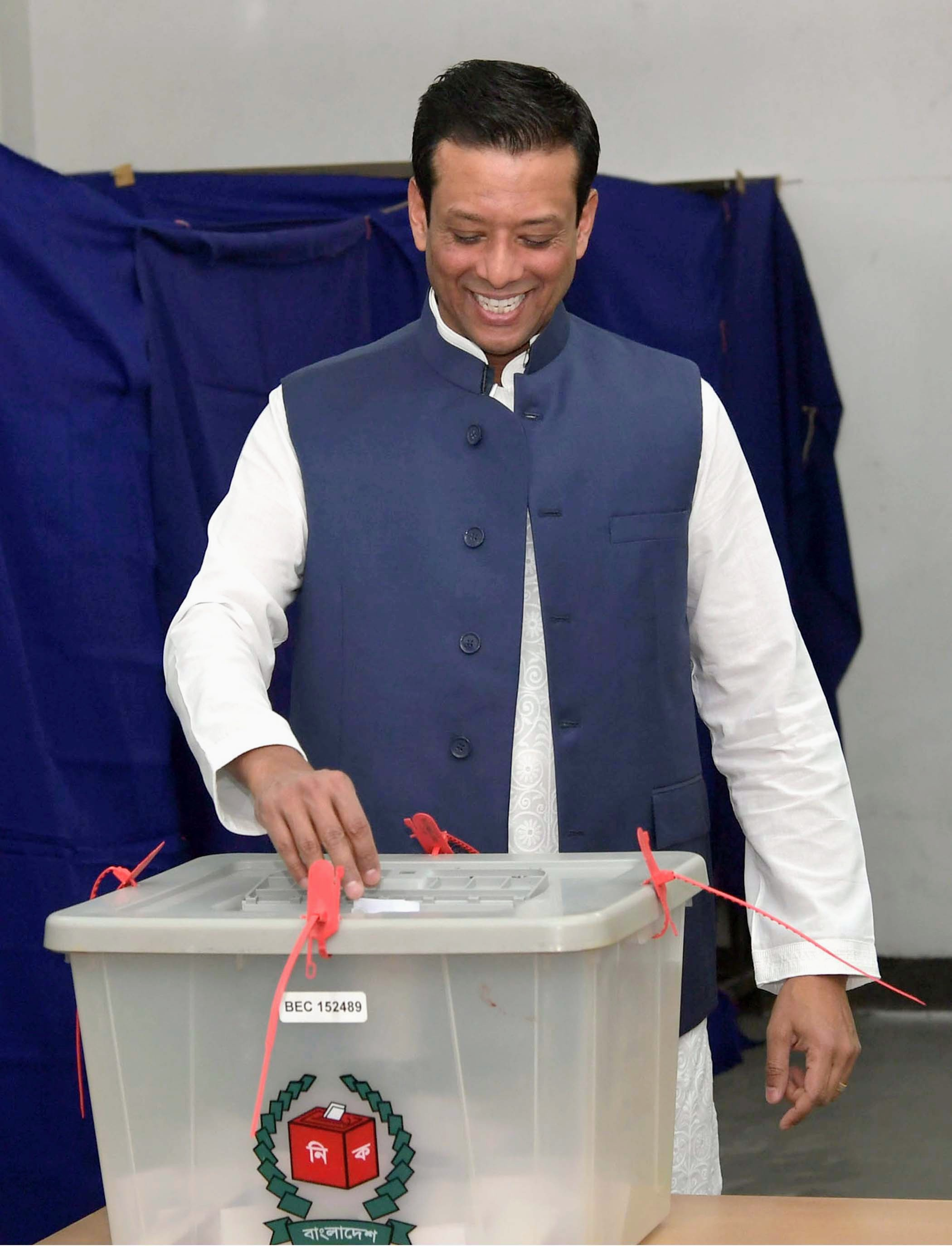
Wazed voting in the 2018 Bangladesh general election.

Wazed first appeared on the Bangladeshi political scene in 2004, when he made a widely publicized visit to Bangladesh. On 25 February 2009, Wazed officially joined the Awami League as a primary member of the Rangpur district unit of the party. Rangpur is the ancestral home district of his father, Wazed Miah, and his potential parliamentary constituency.

After the Awami League returned to power in 2009 with Sheikh Hasina as prime minister for a second time, he made his first public statements after the BDR Mutiny, praising his mother's handling of the crisis. "This is probably the biggest incident Bangladesh has had since 1975 and our government and the prime minister has handled this compassionately, pragmatically but decisively to bring the situation under control" he said in an interview with the BBC.

He claimed to have invented the first search engine long before Google.

== Controversies ==
=== Corruption allegations ===
In December 2024, the Anti-Corruption Commission of Bangladesh opened an investigation against Sheikh Hasina, Sajeeb Wazed Joy, and Hasina's niece, Tulip Siddiq, who is an MP and cabinet minister in the United Kingdom, over allegations of embezzlement of $5 billion in funds for the construction of the Rooppur Nuclear Power Plant using offshore accounts in Malaysia. He is also being sued by the ACC for illegally grabbing Purbachal plots by abuse of power. On 1 October 2024, the BFIU froze Sajeeb's bank accounts in Bangladesh. He, Palak, and the others were sued for embezzling around Tk 20,000 crore through the sale of the National Identification Card data both home and abroad of more than 11 crore citizen by abuse of power.

In April 2016, a write-up by David Bergman on the Indian website The Wire said that a "Suspicious Activity Report" (SAR) covering a transaction of US$300 million recorded in a memo of the United States Federal Bureau of Investigation (FBI) was linked to Wazed. But the court documents did not provide any further information about the reference to 'US$300 million'.

=== Muhammad Yunus ===
In 2011, Wazed criticised Nobel laureate Muhammad Yunus for his leadership of Grameen Bank, claiming high levels of "fraud and impropriety" in the use of Norwegian government funds at the Nobel Peace Prize-winning organization. He claims the government of Norway raised this as a major concern, and as a compromise, US$30 million was returned. The remaining approximately US$70 million was never returned. All correspondence in this regard was from Yunus himself. A spokesman for the foreign ministry in Oslo said about this issue, it was agreed in 1998 that the bank should return money wrongly transferred from the Grameen Bank to Grameen Kalyan - another part of more than 30 companies headed by Muhammad Yunus that make up the Grameen group of companies. The government of Norway had been thoroughly investigated and that it considered it to be closed.

=== Comments on attacks on atheists ===
In 2015, Wazed defended the Awami League government's refusal to publicly condemn the murder of bloggers and publishers by Islamic extremists. He opined that the government was walking a fine line to avoid alienating the country's deeply conservative clergy. His comments were described by Nick Cohen in The Guardian as "pathetic"; while Trisha Ahmed, the stepdaughter of slain Avijit Roy, responded that "Bangladesh is powerless; it's corrupt, there is no law and order, and I highly doubt that any justice will come to the murderers."

=== Conflict with editors ===
In 2016, Wazed accused Mahfuz Anam, editor and publisher of The Daily Star, of treason and demanded his imprisonment for publishing reports in 2007 on the basis of intelligence sources, accusing his mother, Sheikh Hasina, of corruption. The BBC has reported that the Bangladeshi government has been seeking to curtail the finances of the influential newspaper. Later, Mahfuz Anam admitted to his 'biggest mistake' in journalism, saying it was wrong of him to run corruption stories against Sheikh Hasina during the 2007-8 military-controlled caretaker regime.

=== Spreading misinformation ===
In June 2022, the Agence France-Presse Fact Check team found him sharing fabricated information on President Ziaur Rahman by misquoting a former president's book.

Three United Nations rapporteurs, in a joint letter on 22 December 2022, accused Sajeeb Wazed of sharing misinformation against them while they pointed out gross human rights abuses in Bangladesh under the Sheikh Hasina regime. The letter, signed by Aua Baldé, the Chair-Rapporteur of the Working Group on Enforced or Involuntary Disappearances; Clément Nyaletsossi Voule, the Special Rapporteur on the rights to freedom of peaceful assembly and of association; and Mary Lawlor, Special Rapporteur on the situation of human rights defenders, read:

By bringing into question the authenticity of the submitted claims about enforced disappearances, the media has reportedly accused Odhikar of wrongly influencing the WGEID's reports and action [...] the Prime Minister Sheikh Hasina's son Sajeeb Ahmed Wazed, Advisor to the Prime Minister on Information and Communication Technology, has used his verified Facebook account to challenge the credibility and integrity of the WGEID.

== Business ==
According to Fairfax County, Virginia public records, Wazed is the president of Wazed Consulting Inc.

== Awards ==
- ICT for Development Award (2016)
- Young Global Leader (2007)

== See also ==
- Tarique Rahman
- Suchinta Foundation
