= Saima Wazed =

Bangladeshi psychologist

Saima Wazed Putul
- সায়মা ওয়াজেদ পুতুল
- Wazed in 2024
- Born: 9 December 1972 (age 53); Dhaka, Bangladesh
- Other name: Putul
- Education: Barry University
- Spouse: Khandker Mashroor Hossain (m. 1995; div. 2021)
- Children: 4
- Parents: M. A. Wazed Miah (father); Sheikh Hasina (mother)
- Relatives: Sheikh Fazilatunnesa Mujib (grandmother); Sajeeb Wazed (brother)
- Family: See Tungipara Sheikh family

Saima Wazed (Bengali: সায়মা ওয়াজেদ; born 9 December 1972), also known as Putul (Bengali: পুতুল), is a U.S. licensed school psychologist and the daughter of Bangladesh's former prime minister Sheikh Hasina. In 2024, she became the South East Asian regional director for the World Health Organization in spite of lacking public health experience and in the face of nepotism charges. In 2025, she was placed on indefinite leave from the WHO for providing false information about her academic qualifications. In September 2026, she resigned from this position.

In 2025, Bangladesh's Anti-Corruption Commission filed two cases against Wazed alleging she falsified her academic credentials to secure her position and misused her influence to obtain approximately $2.8 million from banks for the Shuchona Foundation, which she previously led. In November 2025, she was sentenced to 5 years in jail for the Purbachal scam cases in her hometown Dhaka.

== Early life and education ==
Wazed was born into a prominent Bangladeshi family to Sheikh Hasina, the former prime minister of Bangladesh, and M. A. Wazed Miah, a nuclear scientist, in Dhaka, Bangladesh. Her brother is Sajeeb Wazed Joy. She graduated from Barry University, a private Catholic University in Florida. As of 2011 she was a U.S. licensed school psychologist.

== Career ==
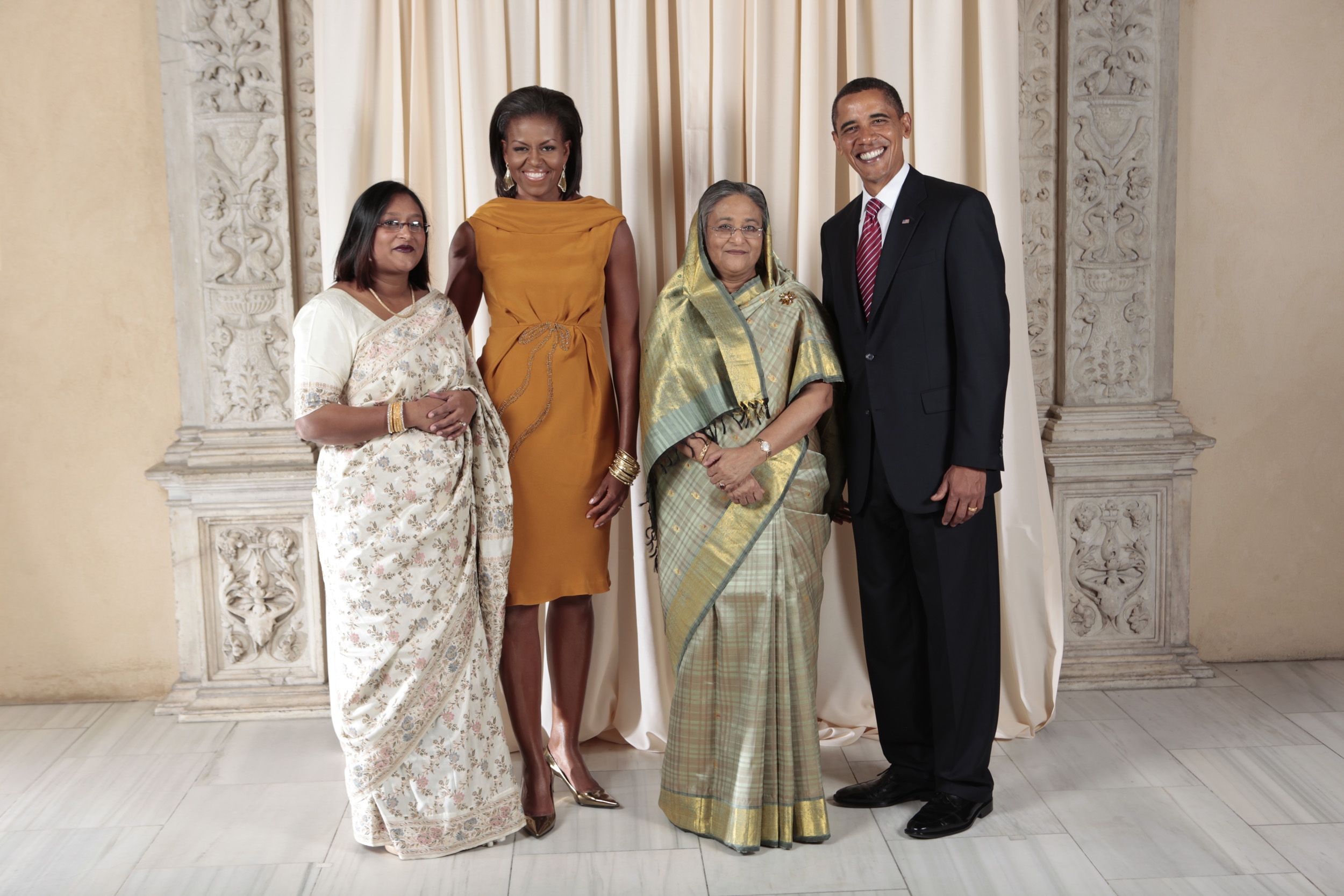
Saima Wazed, Michelle Obama, Sheikh Hasina and Barack Obama in New York, September 2009

Wazed organized the first South Asian conference on Autism in 2011 in Dhaka, Bangladesh. As of 2015, she was the chairperson of National Advisory Committee on Autism and Neurodevelopmental disorders. She campaigned for "Comprehensive and Coordinated Efforts for the Management of Autism Spectrum Disorders" resolution at the World Health Assembly, which adopted the resolution, and in 2016 Autism Speaks praised her for spearheading "a truly global push for support for this resolution". She had been drafted as a global autism advocate of World Health Organization's (WHO) 25-member Expert Advisory Panel on mental health for 4 years in 2014. That same year she founded the non profit Shuchona Foundation for people with disabilities, which in 2025 was shown to "embezzle state money by showing fake projects".

In November, 2016, Wazed was elected as chairperson of International Jury Board meeting of UNESCO for Digital Empowerment of Persons with Disabilities.

In April 2017, Wazed was designated as "WHO Champion for Autism" in South-East Asia. In July, 2017 she became the WHO's goodwill ambassador for autism in the South-East Asia Region.

From 2022-2024, Wazed was a member of the Commission for Universal Health convened by Chatham House. In 2024, she became the South East Asian regional director for the World Health Organization, even though she is not public health qualified and had no public health experience. Her victory was seen as result of interstate politics and graft as well as nepotism. In September 2024, she attended the 79th United Nations General Assembly, New York, and made a speech about improving the global inefficiencies as Emergency, Conflict and Climate Crisis Situations and their physical and psychological impacts on adults and children. On 11 July 2025, she was placed on indefinite leave from the WHO for providing false information about her academic qualifications during the nomination process. She resigned from the position on 9 September 2026.

In November 2025, she was sentenced to 5 years in jail for the Purbachal scam cases in her hometown Dhaka. It involved corruption in plot allocations by the Rajdhani Unnayan Kartripakhya (RAJUK) in Dhaka’s Purbachal New Town Project.

== Controversies ==
In 2025, Bangladesh's Anti-Corruption Commission filed two cases against Wazed alleging she falsified her academic credentials to secure her position and misused her influence to obtain approximately $2.8 million from banks for the Shuchona Foundation, which she previously led. These allegations followed earlier claims that her mother, former Prime Minister Sheikh Hasina, improperly influenced Wazed's 2023 election to the WHO role. In April 2025, Wazed's flat in Gulshan was seized by the Anti-Corruption Commission.

The allegations that led to her suspension at WHO involve potential violations of Sections 468 and 471 of the Bangladesh Penal Code, which pertain to forgery and the use of forged documents. The Telegraph reported 14 July 2025 that she forged documents and defalcated 2.7M dollars through a non-profit foundation named Shuchona Foundation, which is chaired by herself.

== Awards ==
In 2016, Wazed was conferred World Health Organization's South-East Asia Region Award for Excellence in Public Health. In 2017, she was awarded the International Champion Award for her outstanding contribution to the field of autism. She received a distinguished alumni award from Barry University for her activism.

== Personal life ==
Wazed was married to Khandakar Masrur Hossain Mitu, son of Khandaker Mosharraf Hossain. The couple have four children. They got divorced in 2021.
