= Bangabandhu Memorial Museum =

Former museum in Dhaka, Bangladesh

- বঙ্গবন্ধু স্মৃতি জাদুঘর

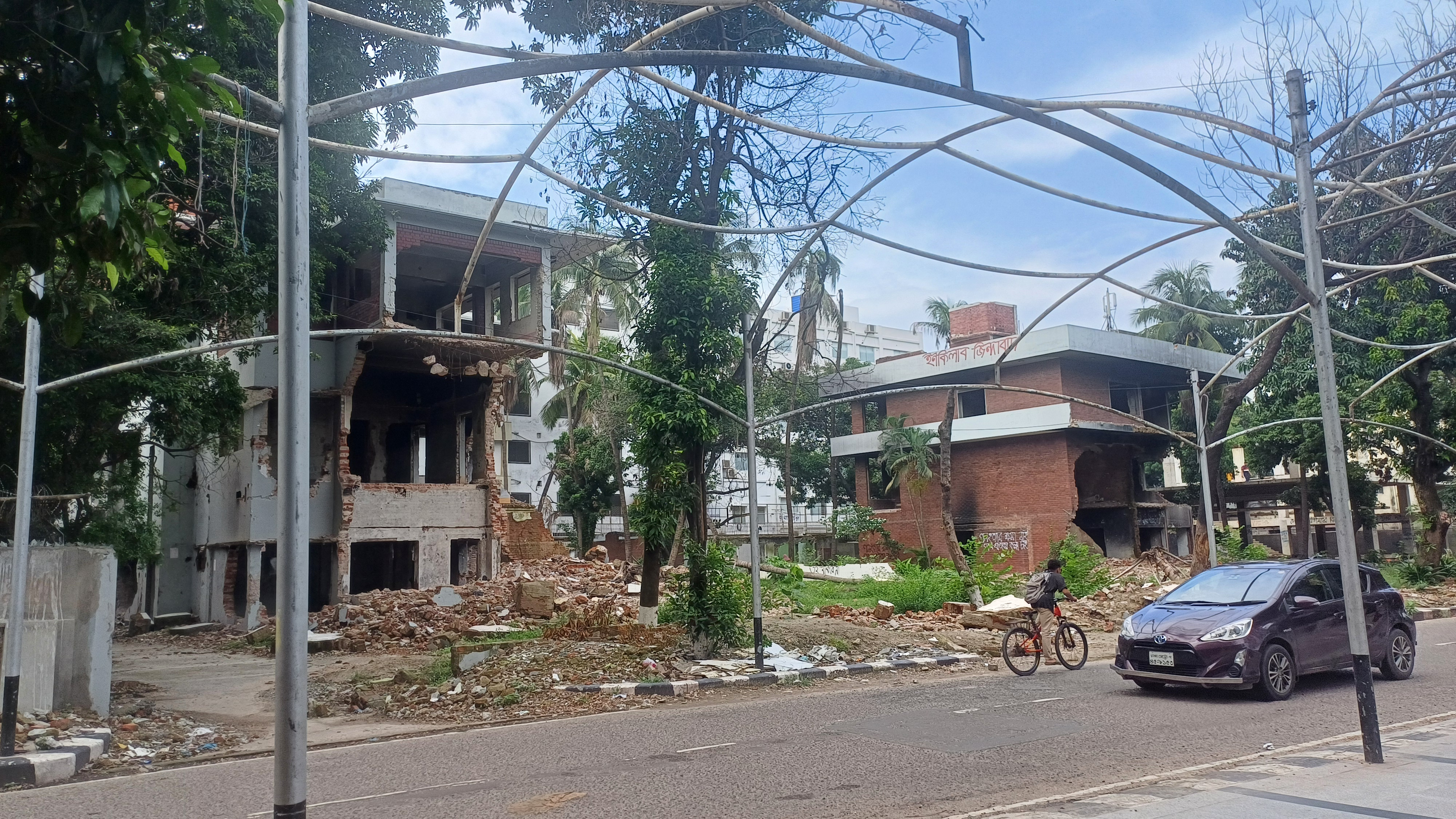
- Ruins of the building in 2025

General information
- Status: Ruined
- Type: Residence (1961–1975); Museum (1994–2024)
- Location: House 677/10, Road 32/11, Dhanmondi, Dhaka, Bangladesh
- Coordinates: 23°45′06″N 90°22′35″E
- Construction started: 1960
- Completed: 1966
- Opened: 14 August 1994 (as museum)
- Closed: 14 August 2024
- Demolished: 6 February 2025; 20 months ago
- Client: Sheikh Mujibur Rahman
- Owner: Bangabandhu Memorial Trust

Technical details
- Floor count: 3

Design and construction
- Known for: Independence of Bangladesh; 15 August 1975 Bangladeshi coup d'état

Website
- bangabandhumuseum.org.bd

Bangabandhu Memorial Museum, (Note: Its official name was Father of the Nation Bangabandhu Sheikh Mujibur Rahman Memorial Museum but was commonly referred to as Bangabandhu Memorial Museum.) also known as Bangabandhu Bhaban or Dhanmondi 32, was a museum located in Dhanmondi, Dhaka, Bangladesh, which was once the personal residence of Sheikh Mujibur Rahman, the founding president of Bangladesh. The flag of Bangladesh was officially hoisted for the first time here before Bangladesh Liberation War. In 1975, Mujib was assassinated with most members of his family in this residence. The museum was listed as a national heritage site in 2009 by RAJUK. It was partially damaged on 5 August 2024 after the fall of Sheikh Hasina and was later demolished on 5 February 2025 in a series of events.

== History ==
=== 1956–1961 ===
In 1956, Sheikh Mujibur Rahman, the industry minister of East Pakistan, applied to the government through his private secretary to be allotted a plot in the Dhanmondi residential project in Dhaka, the administrative capital. A year later, the government allotted him a plot in Dhanmondi for Rs. 6,000. Until 12 October 1958, Sheikh Rahman and his family lived in a government building in Shegunbagicha, Dhaka. Martial law had been declared a few days earlier, and on 11 October Sheikh Mujibur Rahman was arrested. His family were evicted from the property, after which they rented a house in Siddheshwari, Dhaka.

As a result of government threats, the family had to vacate the house in Siddheshwari and move to a rented one in Segunbagicha with help from Sufia Kamal. Sheikh Mujibur Rahman was imprisoned until 1960; after his release, he constructed a one-storey house there. He began living in the two-room, unfinished house with his family, having secured a loan from House Building Finance Corporation, from 1 August 1961. Sheikh Mujibur Rahman had to pay Rs. 1,000 advance to get the plot.

=== 1961–1975 ===
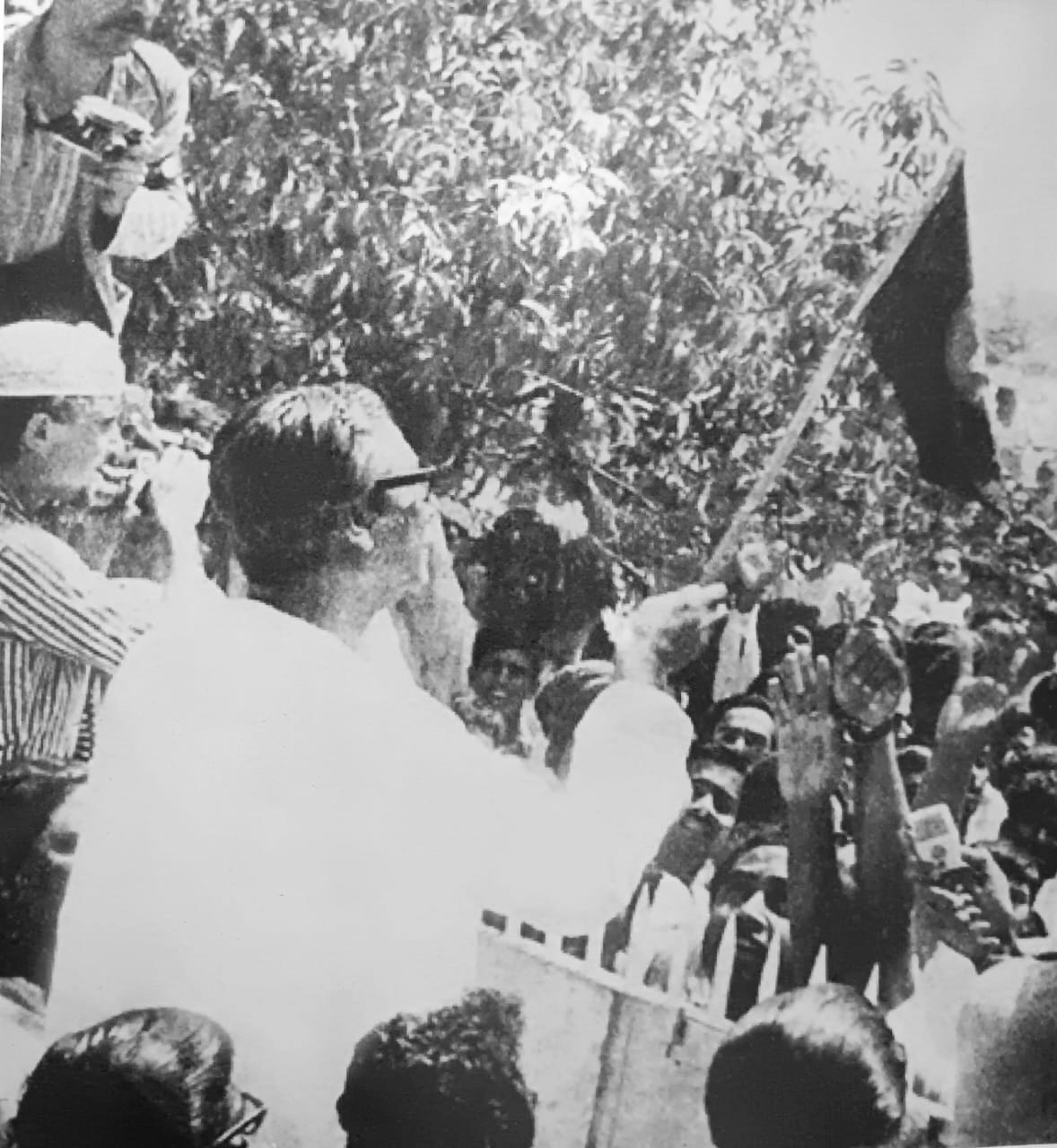
Official hoisting of the Flag of Bangladesh by Bangabandhu Sheikh Mujibur Rahman at 32 Dhanmondi on 23 March 1971

Sheikh Mujibur Rahman's youngest son Sheikh Russel was born in this house on 18 October 1964. In 1966, the house was extended to two storeys and became a complete residential building where many important events in the political history of Pakistan, such as the six point movement, 1969 East Pakistan mass uprising, 1970 Pakistani general election, occurred. It was the centre of political activities of Sheikh Mujibur Rahman and the Pakistan Awami League. On 23 March 1971, Sheikh Mujibur Rahman officially hoisted the flag of Bangladesh for the first time at 32 Dhanmondi. According to his pre-announced instructions, a general holiday is observed across the country on this day. On the night of 25 to 26 March 1971, Sheikh Mujibur Rahman proclaimed the independence of Bangladesh in the house shortly before the Pakistani army arrested him.

The house was damaged during the Bangladesh Liberation War, after which it was repaired. After Sheikh Mujibur Rahman returned from Pakistan, he and his family returned to the house, where they lived from February 1972 to August 1975. On 15 August 1975, disgruntled army officers assassinated Sheikh Mujibur Rahman, his wife Sheikh Fazilatunnesa Mujib, and their sons Sheikh Kamal, Sheikh Jamal and Sheikh Russel. (Note: At that time Sheikh Hasina and Sheikh Rehana, Mujib's daughters, were in West Germany.)

=== 1975–1994 ===
The military government acquired the house after it came to power on 15 August 1975. The Sheikh–Wazed family was forbidden to enter the house so Sheikh Hasina was not allowed inside after she returned to Bangladesh on 17 May 1981. On 10 June that year, Sheikh Hasina obtained ownership of the house when she paid a loan installment; the house was put up for auction due to non-payment of installments of the loan given for construction of the building. On 12 June 1981, the house was officially handed to the surviving family members of Sheikh Rahman's family; Hasina later found Sheikh Rahman's diaries in the building and they were later published in the form of memoirs. Sheikh Hasina continued to live in the government quarter in Mohakhali with her husband after obtaining ownership of her father's house, after which she used it for political purposes.

=== 1994–2020 ===
==== Conversion to a museum ====
After Sheikh Hasina obtained ownership of the residence, she announced it would be converted into a museum, having had the idea after she was arrested for attending a political program during the 1990 Mass Uprising in Bangladesh. Sufia Kamal, Baby Maudud, Gaziul Haque, Pavel Rahman and many others helped convert the house into a museum. The museum was inaugurated on 14 August 1994, and it was handed to Bangabandhu Memorial Trust to turn it into a museum on 6 September 1994. The trust selected architects Ehsan Khan, Ishtiaque Jahir and Iqbal Habib from an architectural design competition. During the conversion, the trust preserved the original structure of the house. On 20 August 2011, the museum was extended by building a new six-storey structure adjacent to the house.

==== Memorandum of understanding ====
The Bangabandhu Memorial Museum signed a memorandum of understanding (MOU) with the National Museum, New Delhi, on 17 December 2020 following a virtual summit between India and Bangladesh, aimed at facilitating knowledge-sharing between the two museums on training, the conservation of fabrics and the curation of exhibits.

== Description ==
The ground floor of the house had a drawing room, reading room and kitchen. The drawing room was used for political discussions, and since the house became a museum, it housed a gallery. Going up to the second floor, Sheikh Hasina's bed room was the first one. Also on the second floor were the bed rooms of Mujib, Sheikh Jamal, Sheikh Kamal and Sheikh Rehana. Adjacent to his bed room was a room where Mujib used to watch television and eat meals with his family. The museum housed Sheikh Russel's possessions such as balls, aquariums, toys and watches. There was also a souvenir shop. It had a virtual section that could guide visitors on a virtual tour of the house. This virtual section also had a showcase that contained several important and historical documents. The new section of the museum had a gallery named 'Sheikh Lutfar Rahman and Sheikh Sayera Khatun Gallery', after the parents of Bangabandhu. There was a library and a research center in the extended part. There was a room here which Sheikh Mujib used as a salon where he often meet visitors and guests. A cyclostyle was installed here after 7 March 1971 which was used by Mujib. There was a personal library room too, from which Bangabandhu declared the independence of Bangladesh by wireless. This room with a telephone was damaged by Pakistani army firing on 25 March 1971. At the entrance to the building was a reception hall on the ground floor which was used for official purposes. While other rooms of the museum were open for visitors, Sheikh Hasina's bed room, store room and waiting room were closed.

== Gallery ==
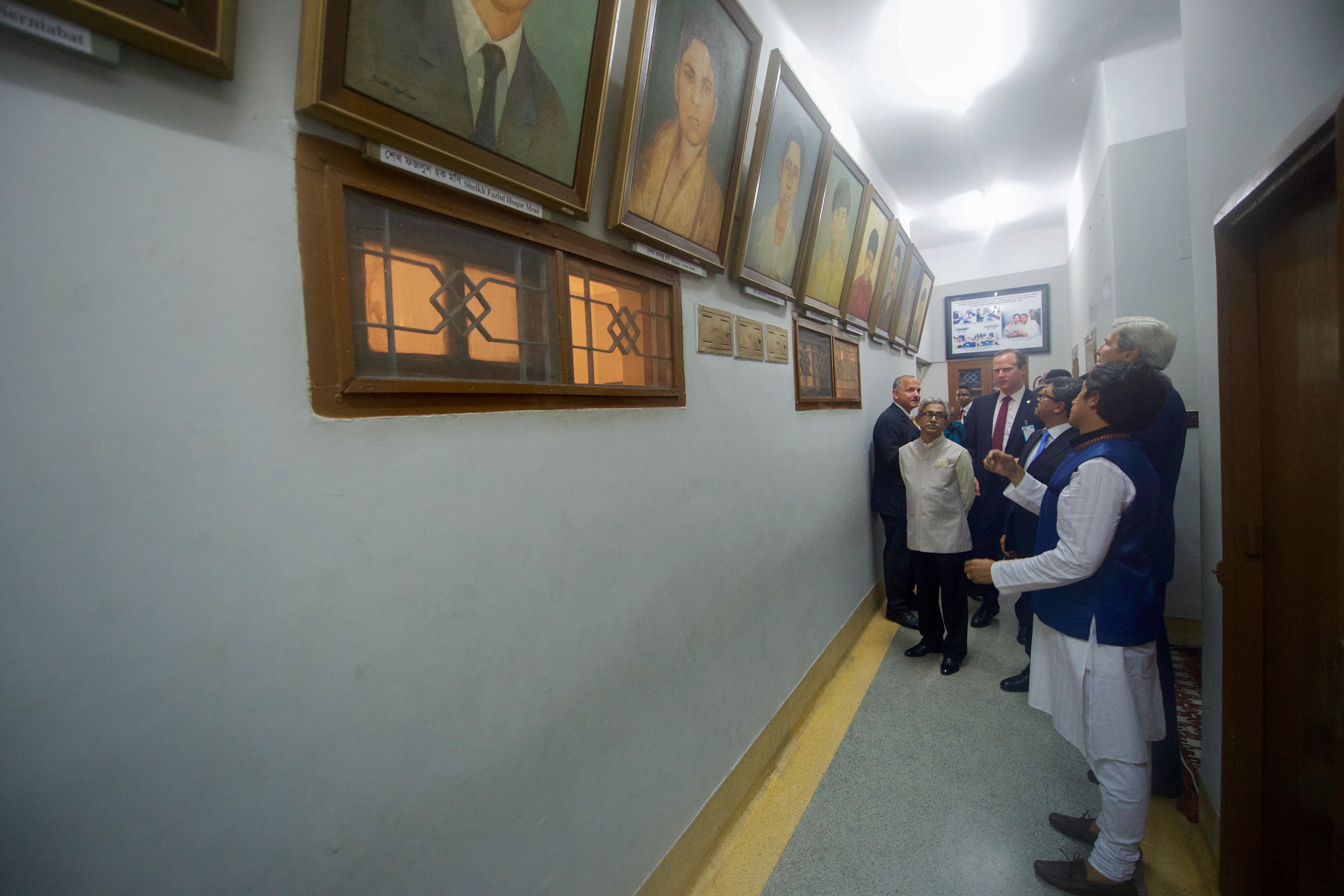
The corridor of the museum

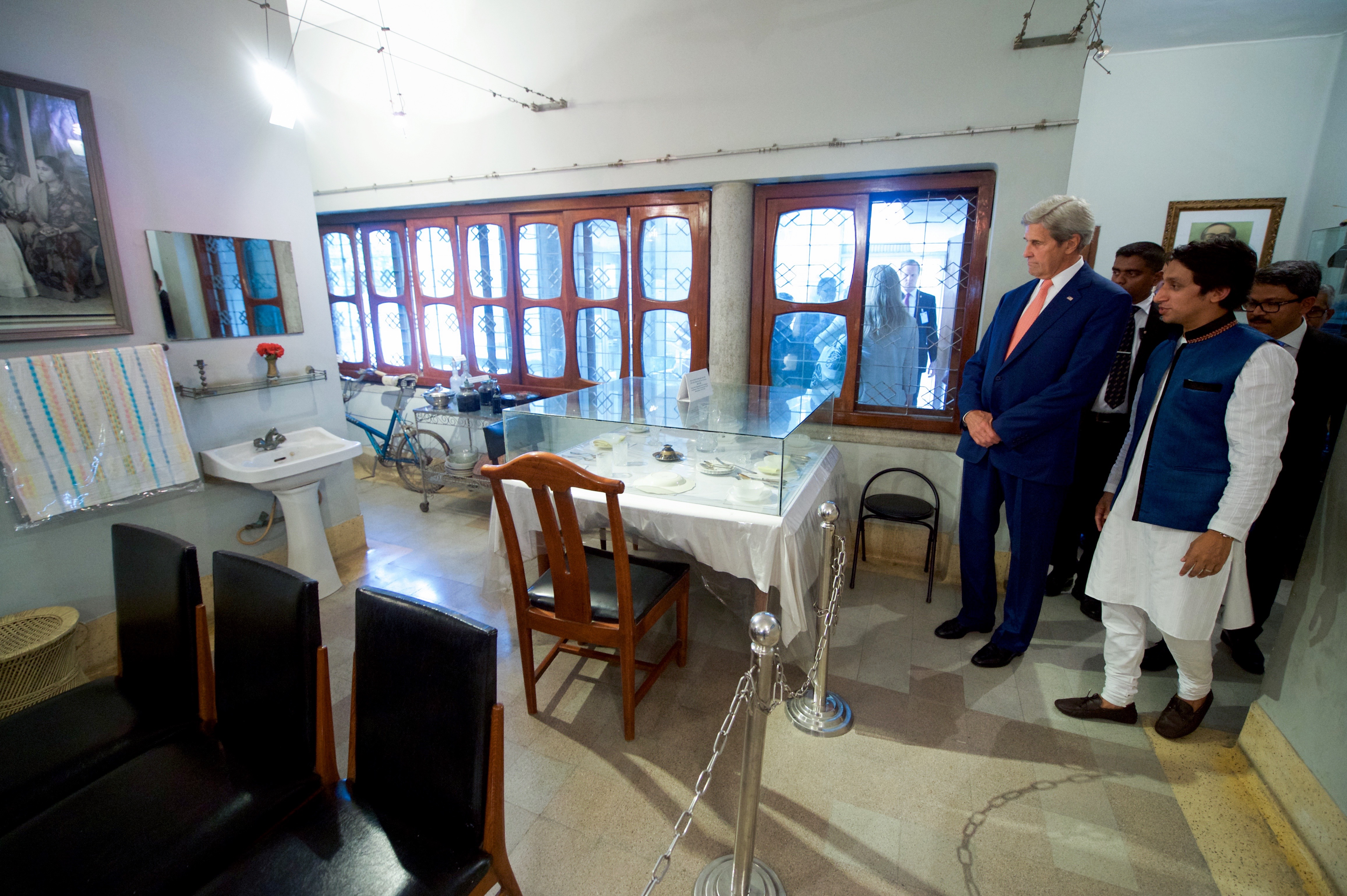
Dining room

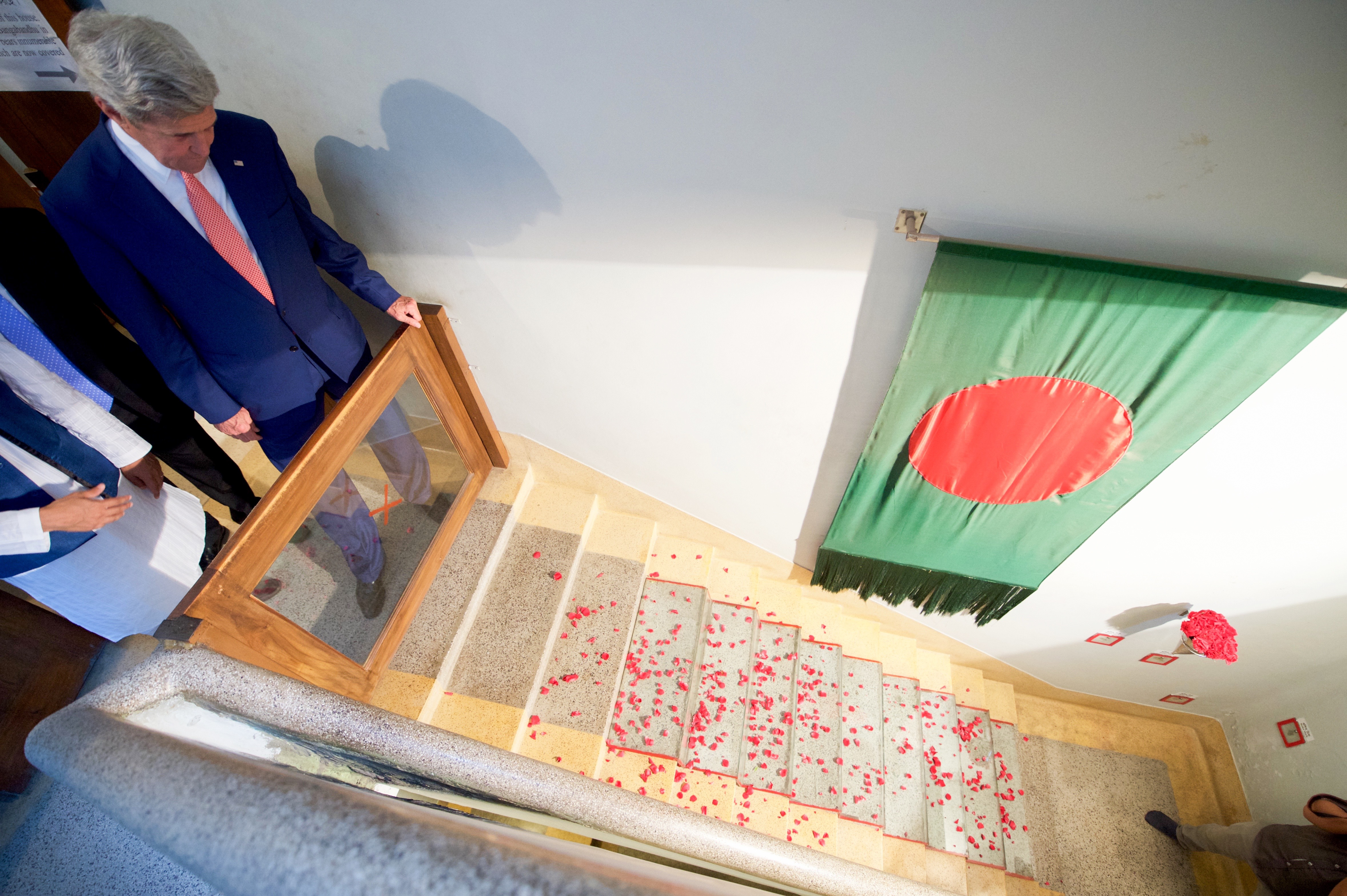
The staircase where Mujib was assassinated

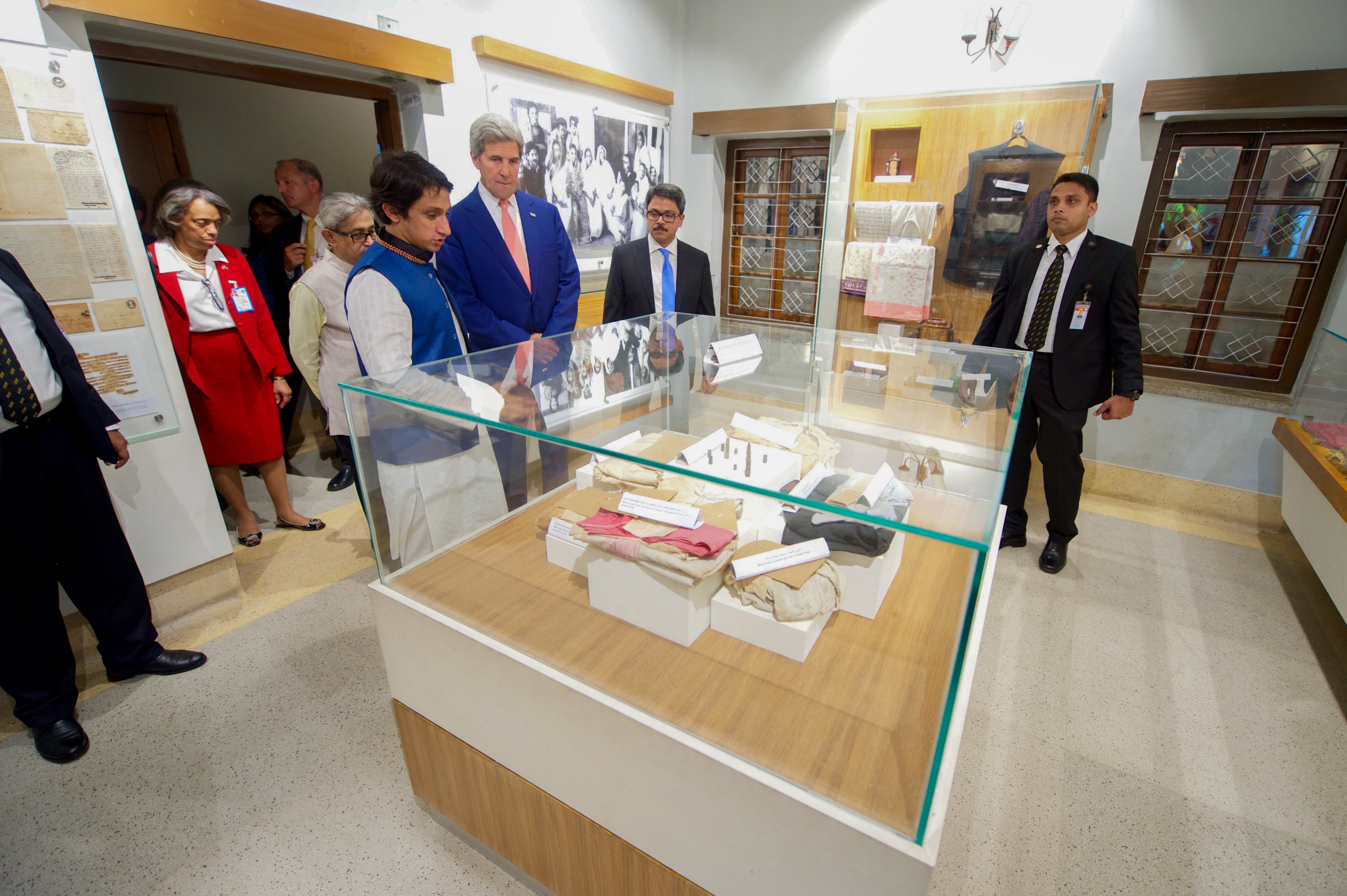
Clothings worn by Mujib and his family members during their assassination

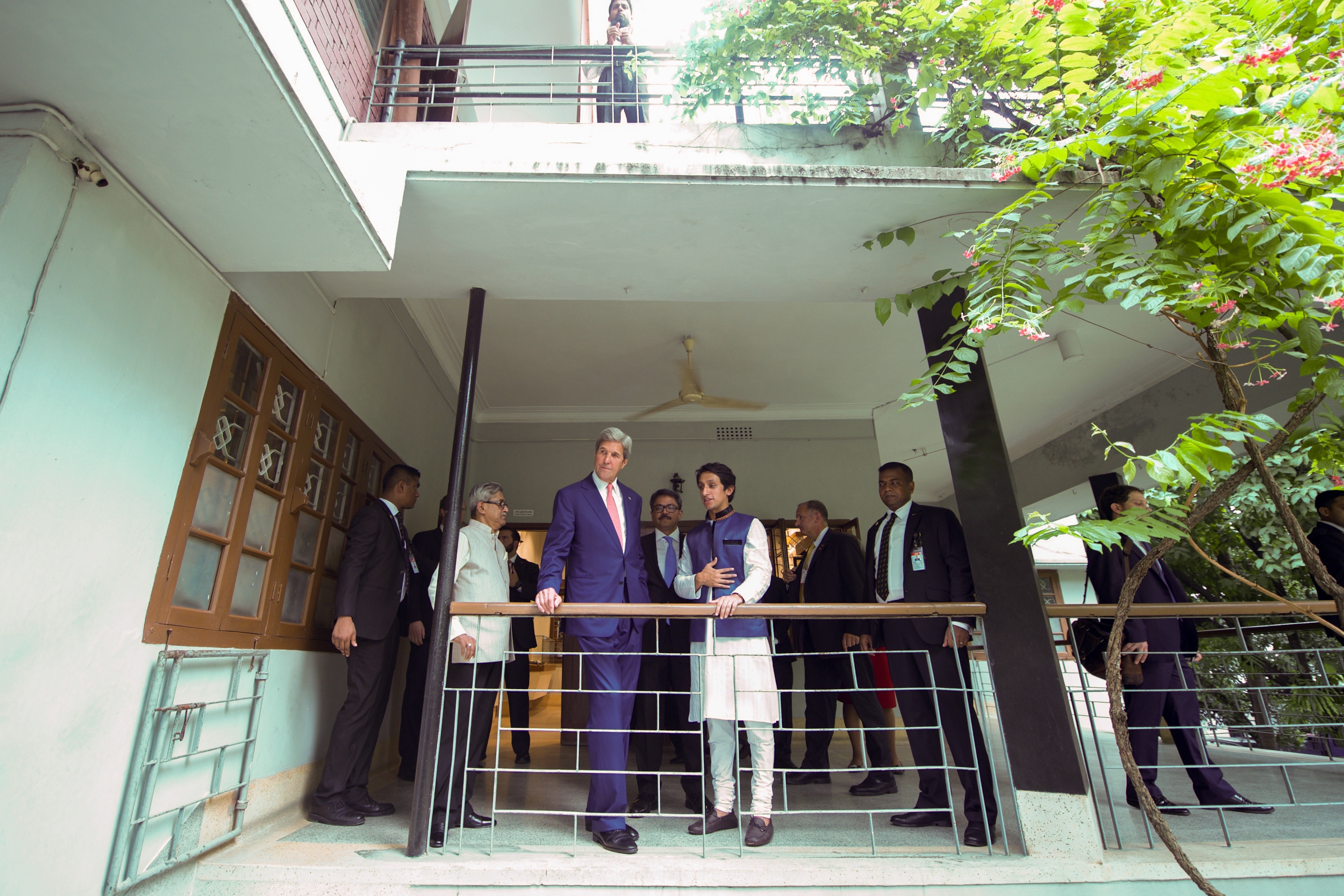
Balcony on the second floor, from where Mujib used to address the crowd

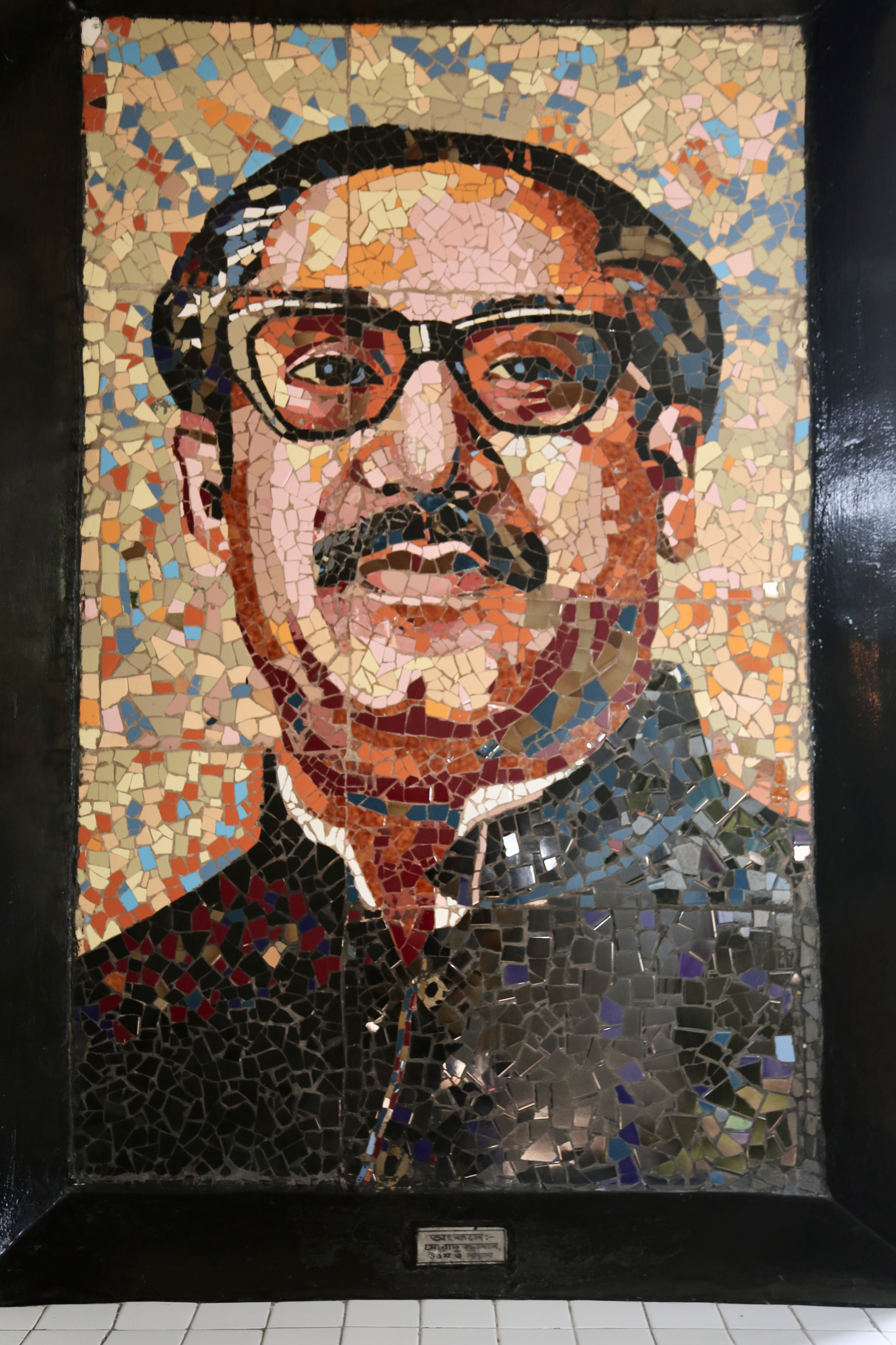
A 1986 memorial portrait, based on Mujib's official portrait from c. 1971

== Notable visitors ==
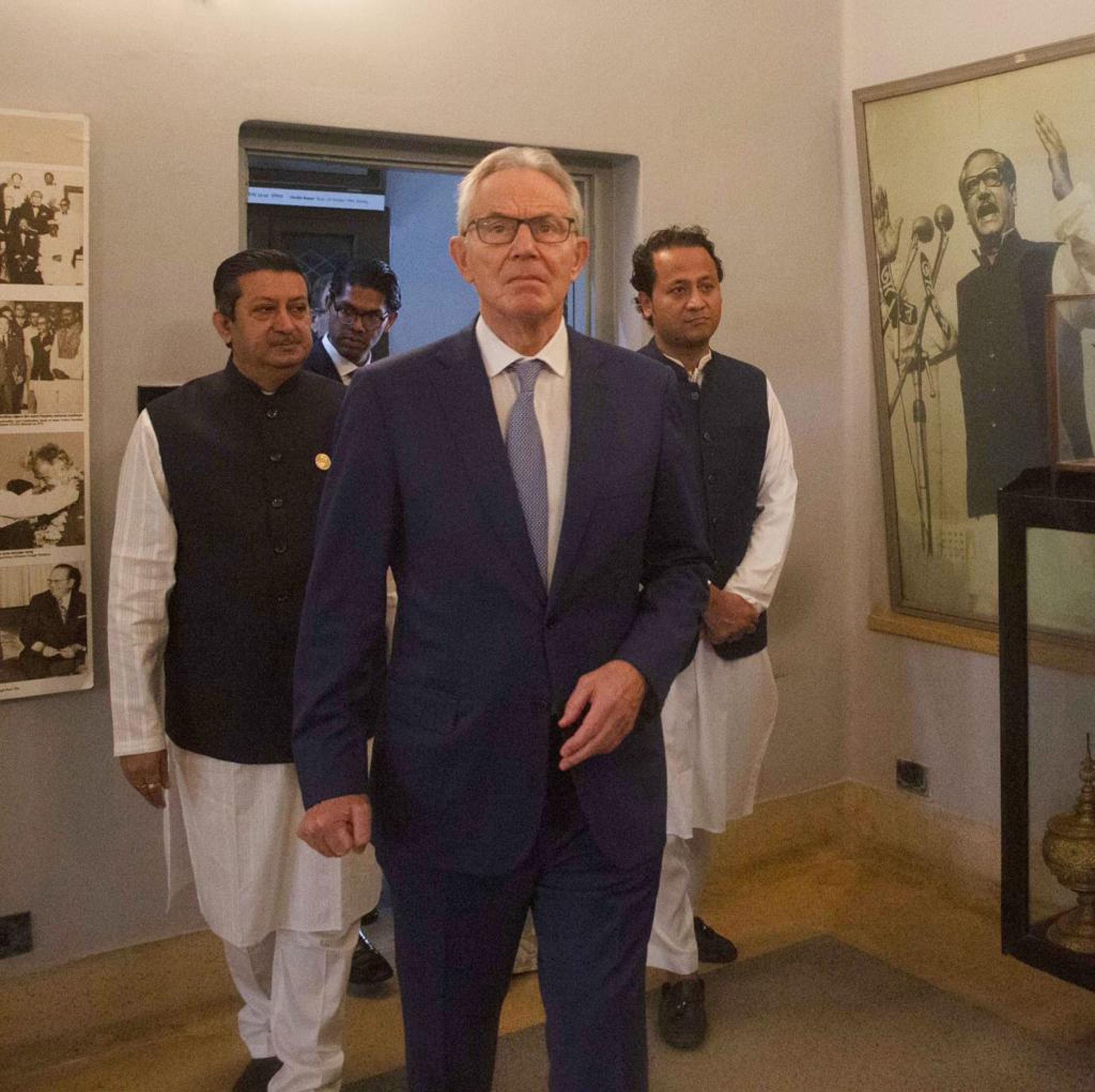
Former British prime minister Sir Tony Blair at the museum on 4 March 2023.

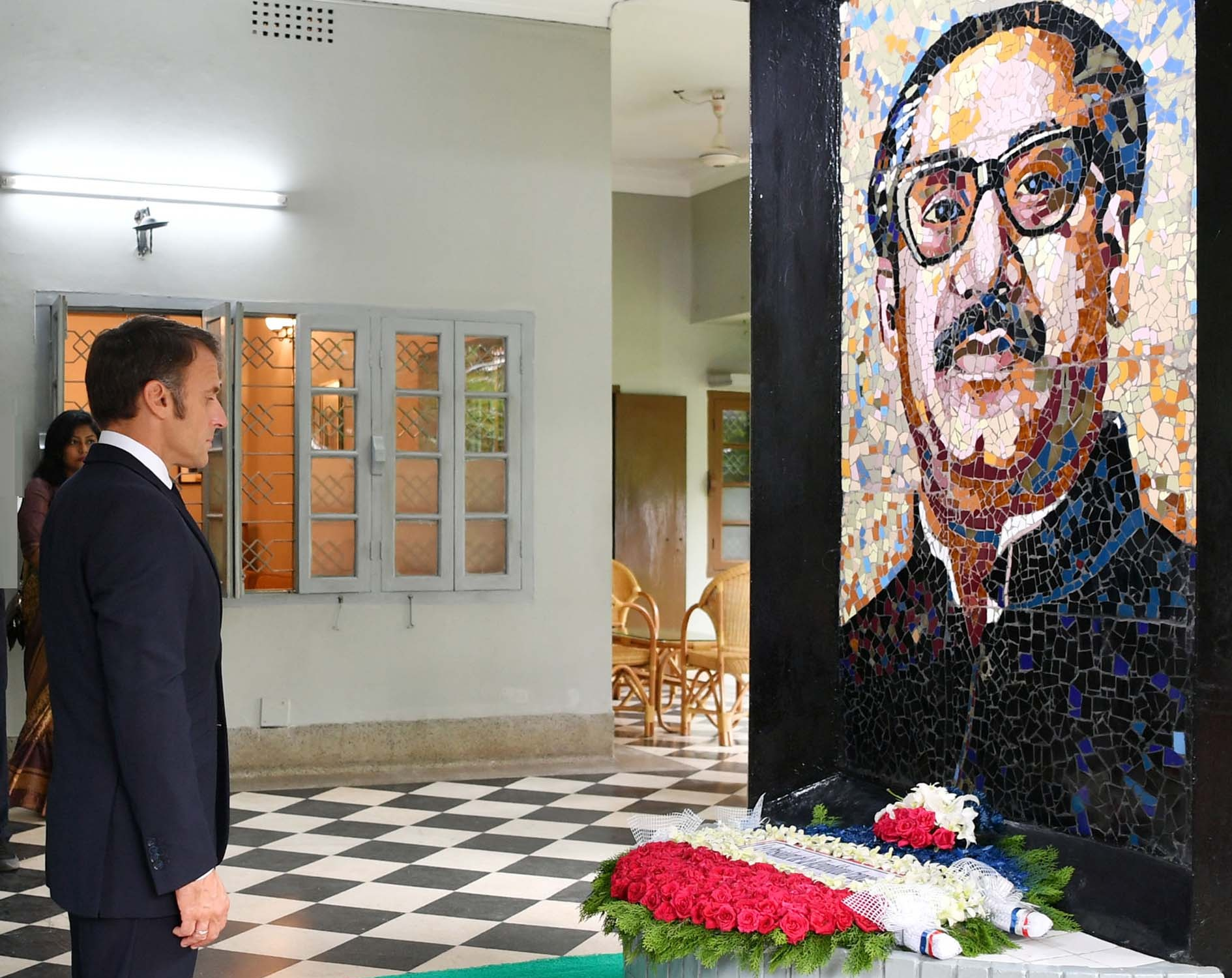
French president Emmanuel Macron at the museum on 11 September 2023.

- Mamata Banerjee, Chief Minister of West Bengal, on 21 February 2015.
- Narendra Modi, Prime Minister of India, on 6 June 2015.
- Ravi Shastri, Director of the Indian Cricket Squad, on 16 June 2015.
- John Kerry, 68th United States Secretary of State, on 29 August 2016.
- Jim Yong Kim, 12th President of World Bank Group, on 17 October 2016.
- Angelina Jolie, American film actress, on 6 February 2019.
- Júlio César, Brazilian former professional footballer, on 23 January 2020.
- Stephen Biegun, 20th United States Deputy Secretary of State, on 15 October 2020.
- Bidya Devi Bhandari, President of Nepal, on 23 March 2021.
- Lotay Tshering, Prime Minister of Bhutan, on 23 March 2021.
- Manoj Mukund Naravane, 28th Chief of the Indian Army Staff, on 9 April 2021.
- Volkan Bozkır, President of Seventy-fifth session of the United Nations General Assembly, on 25 May 2021.
- Faisal Naseem, Vice President of Maldives, on 22 November 2021.
- Ram Nath Kovind, 14th President of India, on 15 December 2021.
- Wang Yi, Foreign Minister of China, on 6 August 2022.
- Michelle Bachelet, 7th United Nations High Commissioner for Human Rights, on 15 August 2022.
- Emmanuel Macron, 25th President of France, on 11 September 2023.

== Attacks, vandalisms and demolition ==
=== 1971 attack and occupation ===
After the declaration of independence of Bangladesh, Sheikh Mujib was arrested by the Pakistani army at 1:30 am, the first hour of 26 March, and detained first in Dhaka Cantonment and then in Miwanwali Jail in Pakistan's Punjab. The Mujib family was kept under house arrest in house 26 of road 18 in Dhanmondi. The house was occupied by the Pakistani army until the war-victory of Bangladesh. The building was damaged by firing by the Pakistani forces. After Sheikh Mujibur Rahman returned home in 1972, when the repair work of the house was completed, he continued to live in this house with his family from the last week of February.

=== 1975 assassination and loot ===
On August 15, 1975, after the Assassination of Sheikh Mujibur Rahman and his family, the house was partially looted by the attackers. On 30 April 2001, 12 military officers were sentenced to death in the assassination case.

=== 1989 attack ===
On the night of 10 August 1989, a group of 15/20 armed men fired gunshots targeting the building and hurled grenades in an attempt to assassinate Sheikh Hasina, when she was staying at the building. Meanwhile, the security guards fired back and when Awami League leaders and activists chased them, the gunmen shouted slogans in favor of the Bangladesh Freedom Party and fled towards Dhanmondi 26. Two separate cases were filed in Dhanmondi police station in this incident. On 29 October 2017, 11 members of the Freedom Party were sentenced.

=== 2024 violence ===
On 5 August 2024, the museum was set on fire by protesters during the non-cooperation movement against the government of Mujib's daughter, Prime Minister Sheikh Hasina. The interior of the museum was looted and largely gutted by the fire. The fire also spread to nearby buildings, causing severe damage. The modern extension of the museum complex, which housed a library, auditorium, and photo gallery, was also completely destroyed. An adjacent restaurant was burned as well. Later, four charred bodies of unidentified persons were recovered from the premises.

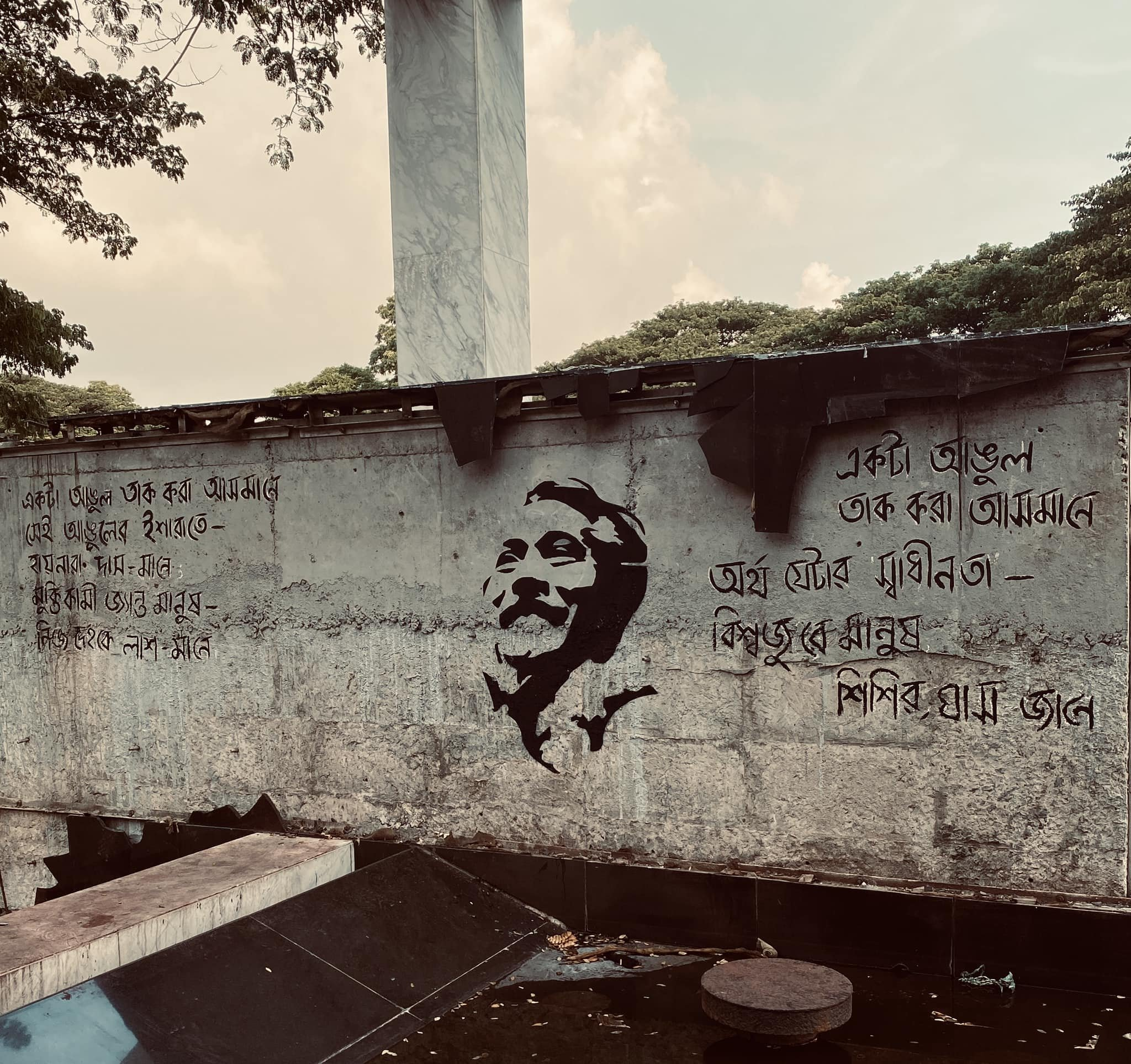
Graffiti work by students on the ruined monument.

The following day, the building was surrounded by crowds, who visited the residence, took photos and painted protest graffiti on the walls. Army personnel who tried to control the situation, were also joined by students. The students and troops blocked several attempts to steal or loot from the site. Many books rescued from the library were sent to the public library. The students later conducted a clean-up operation and the building's security was entirely under military control.

After visiting the site, Abdul Kader Siddique, the founder and head of the Kader Bahini during the Bangladesh Liberation War and former Member of Parliament for the Bangladesh Awami League stated,

"I should have died before watching the way they destroyed and burned the house at Road 32... This destruction done today will be a dark chapter in the history of Bengalis."

On 15 August 2024, on the anniversary of the assassination of Sheikh Mujibur Rahman, some people attempting to visit the site to pay respects were attacked by a mob with sticks. The attack caused the death of one and over a hundred to reportedly be hospitalised. Actress Rokeya Prachy was assaulted at the site when she went to pay her respects and the car of Kader Siddique was vandalized. The roads leading to the site were blocked by mobs dancing to music. They prevented journalists from taking photos of the assaults.

=== 2025 attack and Demolition ===
Ruins of the building following the demolition.

On 5 February 2025, a large group of activists attacked and set the museum on fire following social media calls for a "bulldozer march" aimed at demolishing the site, which protesters labeled a "pilgrimage site of fascism". An excavator and a crane were brought to the residence with attackers vandalizing the house, destroying portraits, and chanting slogans demanding the banning of the Awami League. The event coincided with a speech by Hasina, who urged resistance against the interim government led by Muhammad Yunus. Despite the presence of security forces, no immediate intervention was reported. The incident marks the second major attack on the residence following the fall of the Awami League in August 2024.

Hasnat Abdullah, convener of the Students Against Discrimination, posted on his verified Facebook page earlier in the day, referring the site as a "pilgrimage site of fascism".

Sheikh Hasina condemned the attack in her speech, stating in a live broadcast on the Awami League's Facebook page,

"They do not have the strength to erase the country's independence with a few bulldozers. They may demolish a building, but they cannot erase history."

Referring to the house as a symbol of Bangladesh's independence movement, she questioned,

"Why is this house being destroyed? Who is behind this? I seek justice from the people."

The demolition was condemned from various quarters. On 16 July 2025, the situation turned violent during a program of the National Citizen Party in Mujib's native Gopalganj. During the time, many casualties were caused by police and army firing. On 15 August 2025, people were again obstructed and attacked while paying homage at Dhanmondi 32 on the 50th death anniversary of Sheikh Mujibur Rahman. On 17 November 2025, an attempt at vandalism at the ruins was prevented by the police and the army. On 18 November, 2025, after the death of Inqilab Moncho spokesperson Osman Hadi, his supporters attacked the site for the third time and damaged the remaining debris during political violence erupted following his death.
