= Neeraj Roy =

Indian businessman (born 1967)

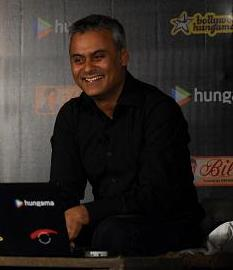
- Roy with Bollywood star Shahrukh Khan at the launch of a social networking community
- Born: 13 August 1967 (age 58); Prayagraj, Uttar Pradesh
- Occupations: Managing director & CEO Hungama

Neeraj Roy (born 13 August 1967) is an Indian businessman. He is the managing director and CEO of Hungama Digital Media Entertainment, which owns Hungama.com and Bollywood Hungama, and managing director of ArtistAloud.com. Under his leadership, Hungama today is South Asia's largest digital and mobile entertainment company. He is also the chairman of the Asia board of the Mobile Entertainment Forum.

He was recently voted amongst the '50 Most influential People in Mobile Entertainment' globally. Roy was also awarded the Sun Microsystems-Economic Times Young Leader award in 2001 and voted as one of 25 young leaders in the new millennium by Business India. He was elected as the president of Indian Chapter of International Advertising Association (IAA) in 2016. He is also a speaker at various international forums and on several domestic and international committees advising on the global mobile entertainment opportunity.

== Early life and education ==
Roy is from Allahabad in Uttar Pradesh, where his father established the El Chico espresso and snack bar. At the age of eight he was sent boarding school at St. Joseph's College, Allahabad, where he completed his schooling. Later he graduated from Allahabad University where he topped his class He moved to Mumbai in 1988 to take an MBA at Sydenham Institute of Management Studies (SIMSREE). Roy wanted to be an entrepreneur from his early days in business school.

== Personal life ==
He is married to Raunaq Roy.The couple have a daughter, Kyra, and live in Santa Cruz, Mumbai.
