= Amit Abraham =

Indian academic, psychologist, and writer

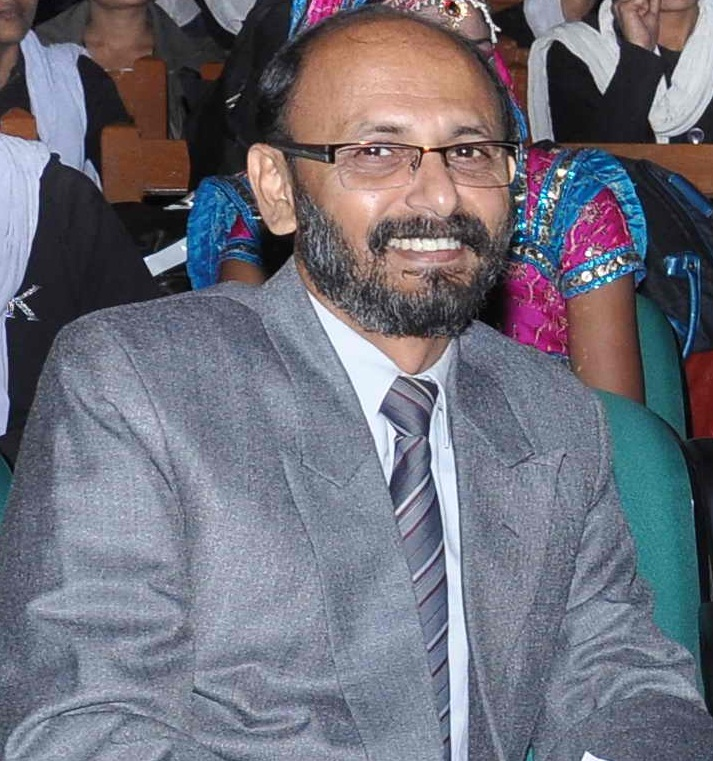
- Born: Amit Abraham; 8 September 1965 (age 60); Gorakhpur, Uttar Pradesh, India
- Occupations: Psychologist, author, academic
- Known for: Counselor, writer
- Website: amitabraham.wix.com/amitabraham

Amit Abraham (born 8 September 1965) is an Indian academic, author, and psychologist. He has worked as the Deputy Vice Chancellor (Academics and Research) at the Mount Zion International University of Rwanda (MZIUR), Kigali, Rwanda, East Africa, (now defunct) from 26 September 2018 to 31 July 2020. Prior to this he was the Registrar at Kazi Nazrul University, Asansol, West Bengal, India (March 2017 – March 2018). He has been the former principal of Scottish Church College, Kolkata, India (July 2015 – August 2016). He has served as the head of the postgraduate department of psychology at St. John's College, Agra (March 1991 to July 2015). He was teaching graduate and postgraduate classes along with supervision of research work. He had been actively involved in various offbeat research works related with the human psyche. He did his schooling from St. Joseph's College, Nainital and his post-graduation in psychology from the Delhi University. His PhD is in the area of personality as determined and influenced by the Zodiac signs of individuals. He has been the Coordinator of the National Commission For Minority Educational Institutions, New Delhi (Under the ministry of Human Resource Development, Government of India, New Delhi) for three consecutive terms (2005–2008). He is also the recipient of the U.P. Shikshak Samman for the year 2006, awarded by Bright Organization of Youth, Agra. He features in text books of various state governments, as an eminent Indian psychologist, which detail out his diversified contributions in the field of psychology and social causes.

== Works ==
Abraham has done work on human sexuality and sexual attitudes. He has developed scales for the measurement of attitudes towards premarital sex, polygamy, pornography, lesbianism, and homosexuality. He has also developed scales for the measurement of values and vocational interest, self-monitoring, procrastination and a case study Performa. He has published research papers in diverse areas and has authored textbooks and books for competitive examinations. He has also written books on general interest and self-help. He has contributed many articles in the leading daily Hindi newspapers and appeared on various talk shows in the local and state television including Moon T.V. (Agra), Sahara T.V. (Uttar Pradesh), and Sea T.V. (Uttar Pradesh and Uttranchal).

He is also the founder and head of Samvaidna, a mental health welfare organization registered under the Societies Registration Act (Registration No. 2016). The organization is providing free guidance, counseling, and therapy for various psychological problems. Abraham's organization also holds regular free guidance and counseling camps in the city of Agra. His organization has done extensive work in the district jail of Agra giving counseling and therapy to the prisoners. Drug de-addiction programs have also been carried out in the jail.

Abraham offers psychological guidance and counseling via the internet to people. He is offering guidance and counseling through the column of a national youth magazine Trailblazer. He is also the consultant for the local print and electronic media giving interviews and talks on various psychological aspects and issues. Abraham along with BIG 92.7 FM and Resonance conducted a week-long "Shine Under Pressure" motivational exercise for children from schools in Agra.

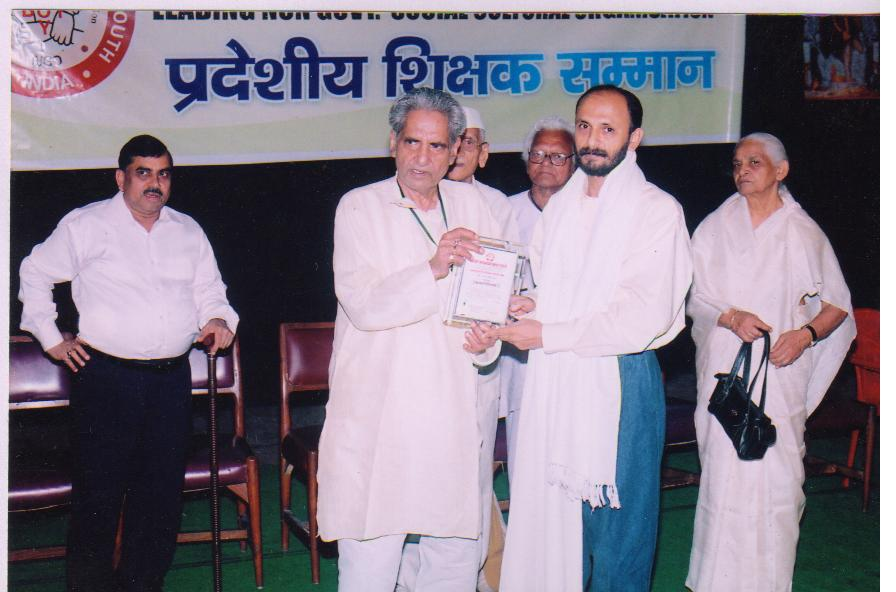
Abraham Receiving U.P. Shikshak Samman From Indian Hindi Poet-Writer Gopaldas Neeraj

== Bibliography ==
=== Books ===
- Amit Abraham. Procrastination – The Opportunity Killer: A Self Assessment Guide and Workbook. Unicorn Books Pvt. Ltd. New Delhi. (an imprint of Pustak Mahal). 2013.ISBN 9788178063379
- Amit Abraham. General Psychology. Tata McGraw Hill Higher Education, New Delhi. 2011. ISBN 978-0-07-107799-6
- Amit Abraham. The Fifth Commandment.(Fiction). createspace.com. 2011. ISBN 978-1-4636-1979-4
- Amit Abraham. The Great Game (a psycho-social political crime thriller). createspace.com. 2011.
- Amit Abraham. Taming the Little Devils Within. Unicorn Books Pvt. Ltd. New Delhi. (an imprint of Pustak Mahal). 2010. ISBN 978-81-7806-208-2
- Amit Abraham. "You Have The Power To Be Happy" Sterling Publishers, New Delhi. 2009. ISBN 978-81-2075-570-3
- Amit Abraham. "Rules of Attraction: Get the One You Admire". Pustak Mahal, Delhi. 2008. ISBN 978-81-7806-151-1
- Amit Abraham. Personality Development Through Positive Thinking. Elgin, Ill: New Dawn Press (an imprint of Sterling), 2004. 1-932705-11-2
- Amit Abraham. Mengupas kepribadian anda. Jakarta: Bhuana Ilmu Populer, 2004. (Translation) ISBN 979-694-850-8
- Amit Abraham. Piense En Positivo y Triunfe / Think Positive and Triumph (paperback, Spanish). Panorama, Mexico (2010-06-30). (Translation)
- Amit Abraham. UGC/NET/SLET: Psychology – Paper II: Upkar Prakshan, Agra.2004.
- Amit Abraham. Fundamentals of Psychology. Y.K. Publishers, Agra. 2002. ISBN 978-81-85070-79-7
