= St. Joseph's College, Nainital =

Private school in Kumaon, India

Coordinates: 29.3745239°N 79.4591427°E

St.Josephs College
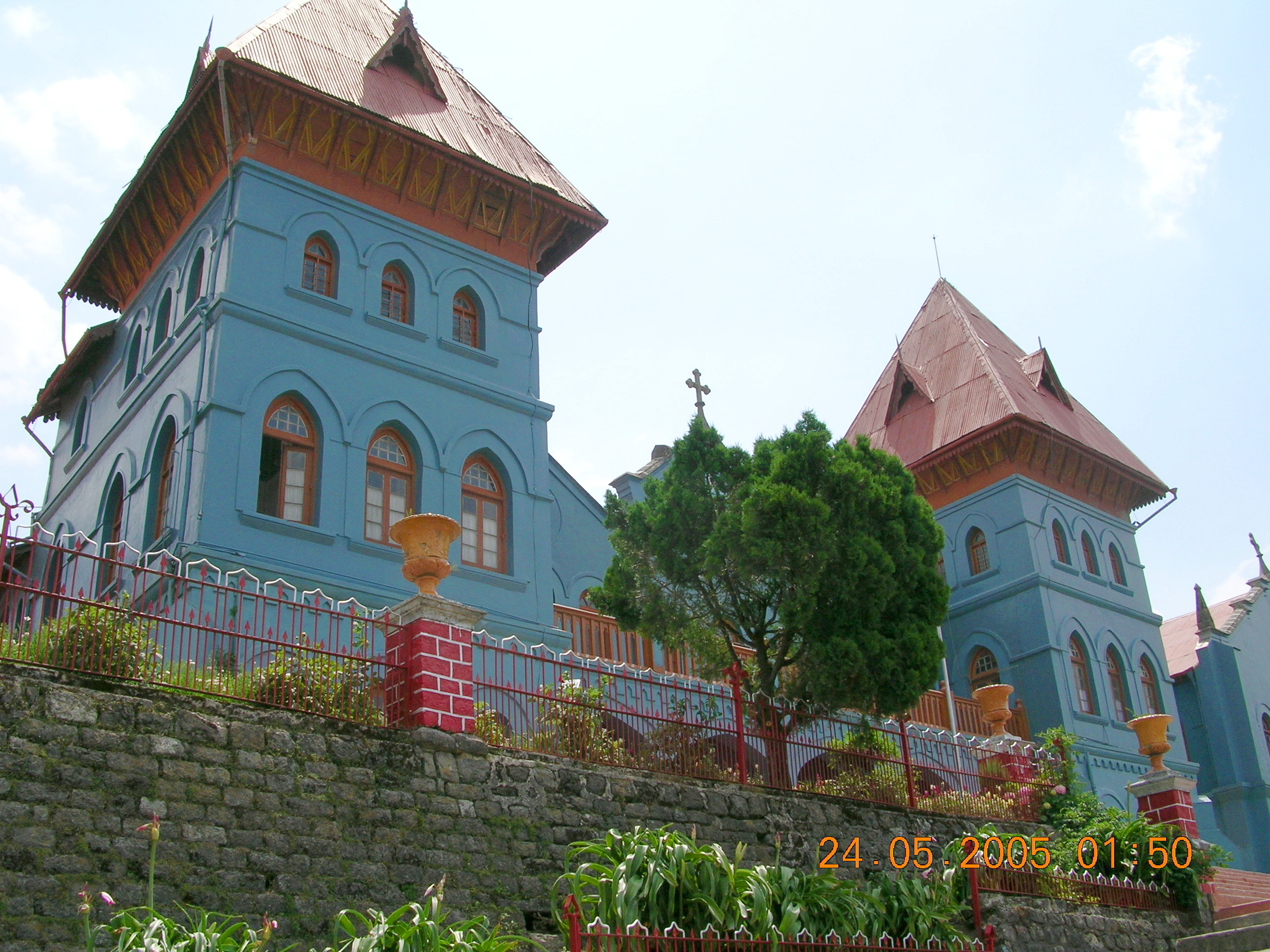
- St. Joseph's College, Nainital
- Nainital, Kumaon, India

Information
- Type: Private
- Established: 1888
- School district: Nainital
- Principal: Br. Sebastian
- Faculty: 90
- Grades: 1–12
- Colours: Dark blue, green and white
- Sports: Football, cricket, lawn tennis, basketball, swimming, field hockey, track and field, squash, boxing, badminton, softball, gymnastics, golf , table tennis, and billiards
- Affiliation: ICSE, ISC
- Houses: Gandhi (St. Peters); Nehru (St. Francis); Pant (St. Patricks); Tagore (St. Pauls)
- Motto (Latin): Certa Bonum Certamen ('Fight the Good Fight')
- Website: www.stjosephscollege.in

St. Joseph's College, Nainital is a day boarding and residential school in Nainital, Kumaon, India, providing private school education.

== Overview ==
St Joseph's College was established in 1888. The site was previously the location of a seminary, run by the Italian Capuchin Fathers. The school is still referred to as "SEM" (for Seminary). In 1892 four Christian Brothers took formal charge of St Joseph's College, and thus began the involvement of the Christian Brothers in the running of the school.

The school is one of 20 educational institutions in India conducted by the Congregation of Christian Brothers, a pontifical institute, founded in Ireland in 1802 by Edmund Ignatius Rice, a wealthy Catholic layman, who was beatified in 1996.

== Student life ==
The pupils are boys of ages 6 to 18. The roll numbers about 1100, with 360 boarders. New admissions are taken only in classes one and eleven. Boarders are admitted from class 3 onwards. The school is affiliated to the Council for the Indian School Certificate Examinations and prepares students for the ICSE examinations. It has a plus-two section for the ISC examination.

The school has seven playing fields, a gymnasium, lawn tennis, two squash courts, basketball court, billiard tables, and a swimming pool. The school takes part in inter-college events. The college has a distinguished football team in tournaments of Nainital and Edmund Rice schools.

The school hosts inter-school events such as the Edmund Rice Meet and the Nirip Deep Memorial Soccer Tournament. Events such as quizzes, debates, declamations and elocution contests are held.

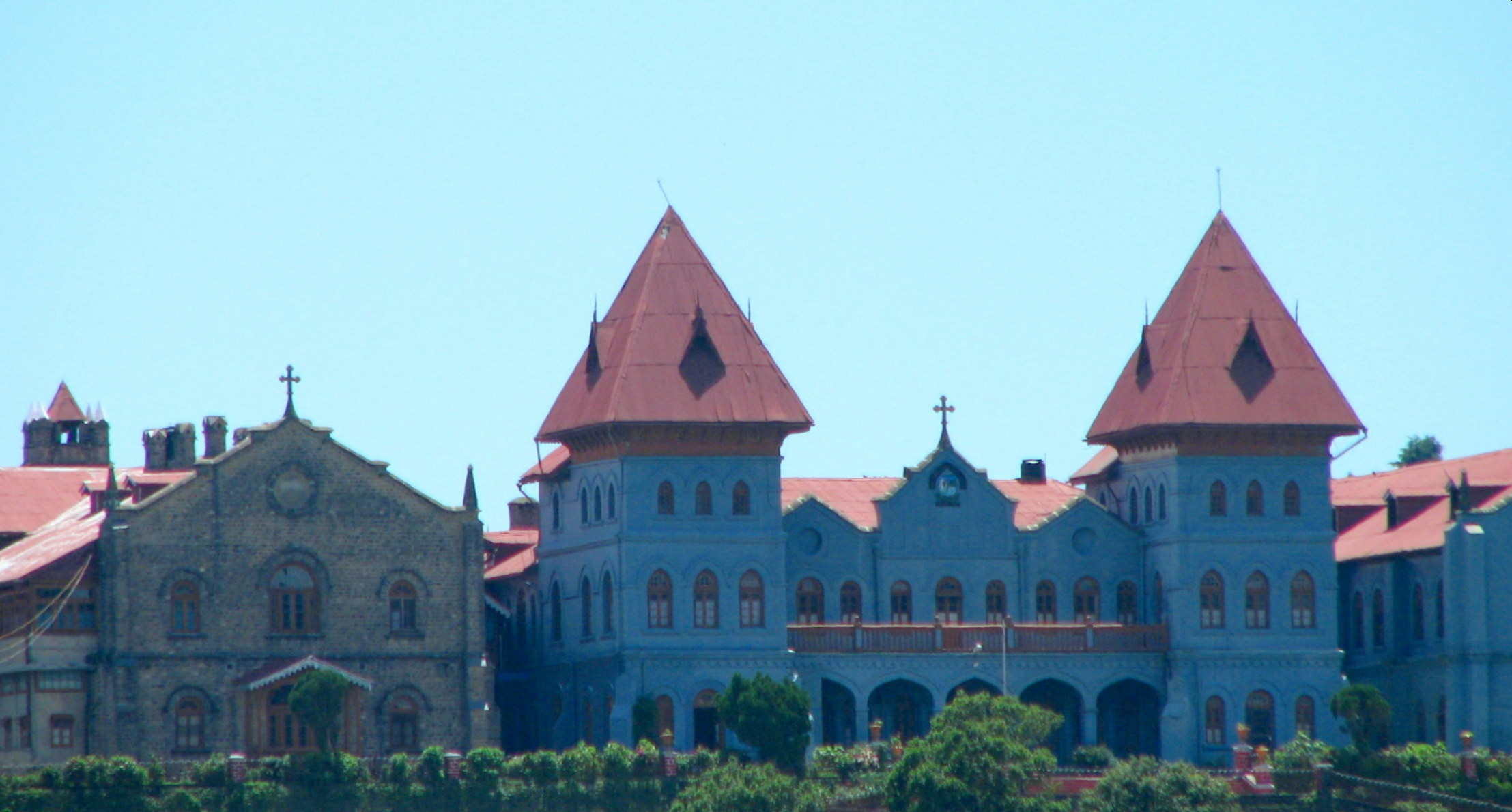
British colonial era facades at St. Joseph's College in Nainital.

== Notable alumni ==
=== Politics ===
- K. C. Pant – Union minister with Cabinet rank and Vice Chairman of the Planning Commission
- Rajendra Singh – head of Rashtriya Swayamsevak Sangh
- K. C. Singh Baba – Member of Parliament, Nainital, Maharaja of Kumaon and sportsman
- Sajeeb Wazed – son of Sheikh Hasina

=== Armed forces ===
- Zameer Uddin Shah
- Rajesh Singh Adhikari

=== Business, commerce and industry ===
- Peter de Noronha – philanthropist and civil servant
- Neeraj Roy – entrepreneur

=== Education, fine arts and media ===
- Sorab K. Ghandhi – scientist
- Naseeruddin Shah – film actor
- Neelesh Misra – songwriter, journalist and author
- Suhel Seth – actor
- Manoj Joshi – journalist
- Amit Abraham – psychologist, academic and author.

=== Sports ===
- Richard James Allen – field hockey player
- Ronald Riley – field hockey player

== Media ==
The school's buildings have featured in Indian films. The best known of these are Masoom (winner of 4 Filmfare Awards) and Koi... Mil Gaya (winner of 5 Filmfare Awards). The school buildings have also featured in various TV series such as Breathe into the shadows.

== See also ==
- List of Christian Brothers schools
