= M. A. Wazed Miah =

Bangladeshi physicist (1942–2009)

- এম এ ওয়াজেদ মিয়া
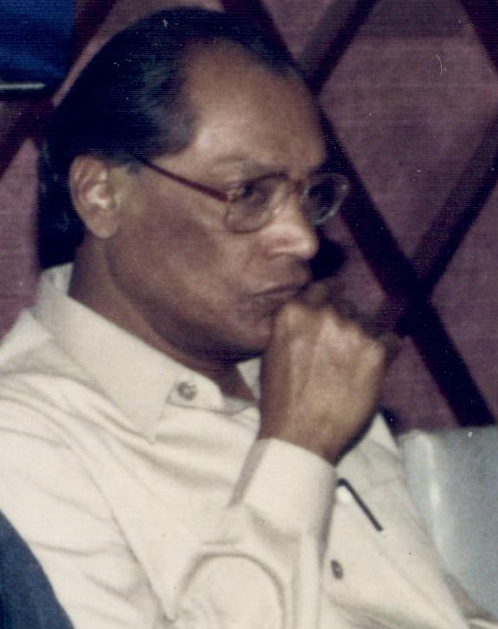
- Miah in 1997
- Born: 16 February 1942; Pirganj, Bengal, British India (now Rangpur, Bangladesh)
- Died: 9 May 2009 (aged 67); Dhaka, Bangladesh
- Resting place: Pirganj, Rangpur, Bangladesh
- Education: University of Dhaka (1962); Durham University (1967)
- Occupation: Nuclear scientist
- Known for: Spouse of the Prime Minister of Bangladesh (1996–2001 & 2009–2024)
- Spouse: Sheikh Hasina (m. 1967)
- Children: Sajeeb; Saima

Mohammed Abdul Wazed Miah (6 February 1942 – 9 May 2009), locally known as, Sudha Mia, was a Bangladeshi physicist and the writer of a number of texts in physics and some political history books, a former chairman of the Bangladesh Atomic Energy Commission and husband of former prime minister of Bangladesh Sheikh Hasina.

== Early life ==
Mohammed Abdul Wazed Miah was born on 16 February 1942 in the village of Fatehpur (Miah Bari) at Pirganj, Rangpur District to Abdul Quader Miah and Moyzunnessa (Maijun Nesa Bibi). He was the youngest among three sisters and four brothers. His uncle was Wazed Miah. He was then called 'Sudha Miah'.

He passed the matriculation examination at Rangpur Zilla School in 1956, and earned his Intermediate Certificate at Rajshahi College in 1958. He followed in the footsteps of his eldest sister's son, physicist Abdul Qayyum Sarker, and took admittance into the Department of Physics, University of Dhaka. In 1961 he graduated with a Bachelor of Science in physics and in 1962 he finished his Master of Science. He completed the Diploma of Imperial College London Course in 1963–64. In 1967 he received his Doctor of Philosophy degree in physics from Durham University, England. His thesis was on the bootstrap hypothesis in theoretical particle physics, and he worked under Professor E. J. Squires.

=== Student politics ===
From 1961 to 1962, he was the vice-president of the Fazlul Huq Muslim Hall unit of the East Pakistan Muslim Chhatra League (now known as the Bangladesh Chhatra League) at the University of Dhaka. He was arrested for taking part in the 1962 East Pakistan Education movement against Ayub's education commission. After university he did not remain involved in politics.

== Career ==
On 1 April 1963, Miah found employment with the Pakistan Atomic Energy Commission (PAEC), initially attached to the Atomic Energy Research Center (AERC) in Karachi. In 1969, Miah got an associateship at the International Centre for Theoretical Physics in Italy. In the same year, he returned home to Pakistan and continued with the AERC. In Karachi, Miah was the chief scientist at the Karachi Nuclear Power Plant but had his security clearance revoked, that led to termination of his contract and his migration to Bangladesh.

In 1975, he received advanced training in nuclear reactor physics in West Germany. His wife, Sheikh Hasina, was with him, when her father, Prime Minister Sheikh Mujibur Rahman was assassinated along with most of his family.

From 1975–1982 Wazed worked at the New Delhi-based laboratory of the Atomic Energy Commission of India in exile with the remainder of the Mujib family after the bloody 15 August 1975 Bangladesh coup d'état. After his return to Bangladesh, he joined the Bangladesh Atomic Energy Commission, and retired as its chairman in 1999.

== Personal life and death ==
On 17 November 1967, Miah married Sheikh Hasina, eldest daughter of Sheikh Mujibur Rahman, the founder of Bangladesh. They have a son Sajeeb Wazed Joy and a daughter Saima Wazed Putul.

Miah died on 9 May 2009, aged 67. He had for long suffered from high blood pressure, heart disease, kidney failure, diabetes, and asthma. He had a bypass operation a few years earlier and an angioplasty in Singapore only a few months before his death. He was buried at a family graveyard in his native village at Pirganj, Rangpur.

== Legacy ==
One of the main science buildings of University of Rajshahi, previously named as 4th Science Building, has been renamed after him as Dr. M Wazed Miah Academic Building and the Information and Communications Technology building of Shahjalal University of Science and Technology is named after him. In 2016, an academic building was constructed in his memory in Hajee Mohammad Danesh Science and Technology University.

== Publications ==
- Fundamentals of Electro-Magnetics (1982)
- Fundamentals of Thermodynamics (University Press, Dhaka, 1988)
- Elementary Nuclear and Reactor Physics (1995)
- Basics of Superconductivity (1996)
- Some Thoughts on Science & Technology (1997)
- Bangabandhu Sheikh Mujibke Ghire Kichhu Ghatana O Bangladesh [Some Events Centring Bangabandhu Sheikh Mujib and Bangladesh] (1993)
- Bangladesher Rajniti O Sarkarer Chalchitra [Politics in Bangladesh and the Background Scenes of Governments] (1995)
- Bangladesher Bibhinna Somosyar Sombhabyo Somadhan [Probable Solutions of the Various Problems of Bangladesh] (1996)
