= UN Working Group on Enforced or Involuntary Disappearances =

The Working Group on Enforced or Involuntary Disappearances has been set up to investigate cases in which persons are detained or killed by states in secret prisons and the corpses are disposed of so that nothing can be proven to them.

== The UN mandate ==
The UN Human Rights Commission created this body on 29 February 1980 by means of a resolution, which also defined the mandate. This UN mandate is limited to three years and is regularly renewed. After the UN Human Rights Commission was replaced in 2006 by the UN Human Rights Council, this latter is now in charge and exercising oversight. An extension of the mandate took place on 6 October 2020, and a further extension was adopted by the Human Rights Council in October 2023.

The members of the working group are not United Nations staff but are mandated by the UN, and the UN Human Rights Council has adopted a code of conduct. The independent status of elected representatives is crucial for the impartial performance of their duties. The term of office of a mandate is limited to a maximum of six years.

The working group prepares thematic studies and develops guidelines for the improvement of human rights. The group makes country visits and can make recommendations in an advisory capacity. Its tasks include examining communications and proposing to States how to remedy any abuses. It also makes follow-up procedures, in which it reviews the implementation of the recommendations. To this end, it draws up annual reports to the attention of the UN Human Rights Council and the UN General Assembly.

== Members of the WEIGD ==
Name	Country	Since
Ms. Aua Balde	Guinea-Bissau	2020
Ms. Gabriella Citroni	Italy	2021
Ms. Grażyna Baranowska	Poland	2022
Ms. Ana Lorena Delgadillo Perez	Mexico	2023
Mr. Mohammed Al-Obaidi	Iraq	2024

== Relevant international human rights instruments ==
Refer to the International Convention for the Protection of All Persons from Enforced Disappearance.
