= Bollywood Hungama =

Indian entertainment website

- Bollywood Hungama homepage screenshot on 23 August 2023
- Website type: Entertainment news, reviews
- Available in: English, Hindi
- Owner: Hungama Digital Media Entertainment
- Website: bollywoodhungama.com
- Commercial: Yes
- Registration: Free/subscription
- Launched: 16 June 1998; 28 years ago

Bollywood Hungama (lit. "Bollywood Madness" in Hindi), previously known as IndiaFM (or IndiaFM.com), is an Indian entertainment website, owned by Hungama Digital Media Entertainment, which acquired the website in 2000.

The website provides news related to Indian cinema, particularly Hindi cinema, film reviews and box office reports. Launched on 15 June 1998, the website was originally named "IndiaFM.com". It changed its name to "Bollywood Hungama" in 2008.

== Hungama.com ==
Hungama Digital Media
- Type: Private
- Industry: Entertainment
- Founded: 1 April 1999; 27 years ago
- Founder: Neeraj Roy
- Headquarters: Mumbai, Maharashtra, India
- Products: Films; web series; animation; music; digital media
- Subsidiaries: Bollywood Hungama
- Website: www.hungama.org

Hungama Digital Media is an Indian digital entertainment company, headquartered in Mumbai, India. The company was first launched in 1999 by Ashish Kacholia, Hiren Ved, Lashit Sanghvi, Rakesh Jhunjhunwala, and Neeraj Roy as an online promotions agency. The company has since grown to also serve as an aggregator, developer, publisher, and distributor of Bollywood and Asian entertainment.

The company first launched in 1999 as "Hungama.com", a promotional marketing portal. In 2000 the company acquired Indiafm and in the following years began to work marketing campaigns for companies such as Coca-Cola and Nike. In 2007 Hungama launched their gaming portal and in 2009, the company re-launched their website and company name, changing it to Hungama Digital Media Entertainment Pvt. Ltd. In 2012 Hungama Digital Media Entertainment launched Artist Aloud!, a digital platform for artists and independent music fans. It won a gold award for Best Digital Communications Campaign from the Promotion Marketing Awards of Asia (2009).
