= Shuchona Foundation =

Disability organization based in Bangladesh

- Formation: 2014
- Headquarters: Dhaka, Bangladesh
- Region served: Bangladesh
- Official language: Bengali
- Website: Shuchona Foundation

{{merge to Saima Wazed Putul}}

Shuchona Foundation (Bengali: সূচনা ফাউন্ডেশন) is a Bangladeshi non-profit foundation that works to help people with mental disability, neurological disability, autism, and mental health issues. Saima Wazed, daughter of former Prime Minister Sheikh Hasina, is the founder and chairperson of the foundation.

== History ==
Shuchona Foundation was established in 2014. It was for a while known as Global Autism. The foundation released an app with Samsung mobile called "Look at me" that specifically designed to help with autism.

On 17 May 2017, 37 commercial banks donated 1360 million taka to Shuchona Foundation along with Jatir Janak Bangabandhu Sheikh Mujibur Rahman Memorial Trust and Prime Minister’s Education Assistance Trust. On 4 June 2017, Shuchona Foundation started a program to train trainer who would provide information to lactating mothers with the Ministry of Women and Children Affairs.

In Januaray 2025, Saima Wazed, the leader of the Foundation and daughter of former Bangladesh Prime Minister Sheikh Hasina, was accused of corruption using the Foundation for personal gain after Anti-Corruption Commission found no existence of the foundation at its headquarters.
