= Hajera Mahtab =

Bangladeshi professor

Hajera Mahtab is a Bangladeshi physician, researcher and a fellow of the Bangladesh Academy of Sciences. She was President of the Endocrine Society of Bangladesh. She is a member of the Association of Physicians of Bangladesh. She is a member of the trustees board of the Bangladesh Diabetic Foundation. She is a member of the trustee board of the Bangladesh University of Health Sciences.

Mahtab was the Chief Consultant of the Diabetes and Endocrinology Department at the Bangladesh Institute of Health Sciences General Hospital. She is the professor emeritus of BIRDEM and Bangladesh Institute of Health Sciences. She is an advisor of Centre for Global Health Research.

== Early life and education ==
Mahtab was born on 22 September 1941 in Calcutta, West Bengal, British India. Her father was Muhammad Ibrahim, founder of BIRDEM, and her mother was Nilima Ibrahim. She married Fasihuddin Mahtab, son of Pakistan National Assembly member Mahtabuddin Sarker. Her sister was actress Dolly Anwar who was married to Anwar Hossain, a photographer. Her other sister is Professor Kishwar Azad who is married to professor AK Azad Khan.

Mahtab finished her Senior Cambridge with first division. In 1964, she finished her MBBS at the University of Liverpool. She then did a Diploma in Tropical Medicine and Hygiene at the University of Liverpool in 1965. She did her Fellowship of the College of Physicians and Surgeons in 1970 at the College of Physicians and Surgeons Pakistan. She studied at King's College Hospital in 1972 as a Commonwealth Fellow.

== Career ==
From 1962 to 1972, Mahtab was a research assistant at the Bangladesh Medical University. She was an assistant professor of medicine at the Bangabandhu Sheikh Mujib Medical University from 1973 to 1976. From October 1976, she was a Senior Consultant in Medicine at BIRDEM. In 1977, she was the Project Manager of the diabetic programme of the World Health Organization. From 1979 to 1980, she was the head of the Bangladesh Institute of Research and Training on Applied Nutrition. In 1982, she was appointed director of the Collaborating Centre for the Prevention and Control of Diabetes of the World Health Organization. From 1983 to 1986, she was member of World Health Organization's Advisory Council for Health and Medical Research of the South-East Region.

Mahtab was the associate professor of medicine at the National Institute of Diseases of the Chest and Hospital from 1980 to 1990. She was a consultant of the Ministry of Health Oman from 1989 to 1991. She was a professor of medicine at the Mymensingh Medical College when she retired on 21 September 1998. From November 2000 to August 2003, chairperson of the International Diabetes Federation's South-East Asia Regional Council. She served as the director of clinical services, research and academy at BIRDEM till September 2003. From September 2003 to December 2004, she was an advisor of the National Healthcare Network project of the Diabetic Association of Bangladesh.

In January 2005, Mahtab was elected member of the National Council of the Diabetic Association of Bangladesh. She was the chairperson of the National Healthcare Network. She was a management board member of BIRDEM. In January 2006, she was appointed a board member of Ibrahim Medical College. She founded the Under 30 Clinic of BIRDEM. She was editor of the Diabetes and Endocrine Journal which is published by the Endocrine Society of Bangladesh and Diabetic Association of Bangladesh. In 2018, she was awarded the Mohammad Ibrahim Memorial Gold Medal.
