= Liaquat Ali (professor) =

- Born: 26 February 1957 (age 69); Chapai Nawabganj District, East Pakistan, Pakistan
- Education: Sir Salimullah Medical College (MBBS); Bangladesh Medical University (MPhil); Uppsala University (PhD)
- Scientific career
- Fields: Medical biochemistry, cell biology, public health
- Workplaces: BIRDEM, Bangladesh University of Health Sciences

Liaquat Ali (born 26 February 1957) is a Bangladeshi physician, academic, and researcher specializing in medical biochemistry, cell biology, and public health. He was the founding Vice-Chancellor of the Bangladesh University of Health Sciences, chairperson of Pothikrit Foundation, and one of the founders of Bishwo Shahitto Kendro. He served in the Health Sector Reform Commission of the Yunus Ministry led by Muhammad Yunus.

== Early life and education ==
Ali was born in the village of Binodpur, Chapai Nawabganj District, East Pakistan, Pakistan on 26 February 1957. He grew up in Sabdalpur, Nachole Upazila. His father was M. Shahabuddin and his mother was Hamsha Uddin. He completed his Secondary School Certificate in 1972 from Alinagar High School and his Higher Secondary Certificate in 1974 from Rajshahi College. He earned his MBBS degree from Sir Salimullah Medical College in 1982. He later obtained an MPhil in Medical Biochemistry from the Institute of Postgraduate Medicine and Research (now Bangladesh Medical University) in 1986. In 1990, he completed his PhD in Medical Cell Biology from Uppsala University.

== Career ==
Ali began his professional career in clinical medicine, serving as Assistant Surgeon, Medical Officer, and Assistant Registrar at several hospitals, including the Institute of Postgraduate Medicine and Research and Rajshahi Medical College Hospital. He later joined Sir Salimullah Medical College as a lecturer in physiology and biochemistry. From 1991 to 2009, he worked at BIRDEM. During this period, he held multiple positions, culminating in his appointment as Professor of Biochemistry and Cell Biology.

Ali was the founding Director of the Bangladesh Institute of Health Sciences and later became the founding Vice-Chancellor of the Bangladesh University of Health Sciences, established in 2012. He served in this role, along with being an Honorary Professor of Biochemistry and Cell Biology, until July 2018. He is the Honorary Advisor to the Pothikrit Institute of Health Studies.

In addition to his academic career, Ali has contributed extensively to the development of the Diabetic Association of Bangladesh. He has worked with the Directorate General of Health Services, the Ministry of Health and Family Welfare, the University of Dhaka, the Bangladesh Medical Research Council, and the University Grants Commission. He was the General Secretary of the Bangladesh Endocrine Society from 2000 to 2015 and President of the Bangladesh Society of Medical Biochemists. He was a member of the Government of Bangladesh’s COVID-19 public health advisory group.

Ali was involved in the early development of Bishwo Shahitto Kendro, serving as a founding secretary and later as a director until 1991. He is also the founding chair of the Pothikrit Foundation, which operates a cultural center in Dhaka known as Sangskriti Bikash Kendra, where he leads study circles on the history of ideas. He was elected a Fellow of the Bangladesh Academy of Sciences in 1999 and received its Best Scientist Award in Biological Sciences in 2014.

After the fall of the Sheikh Hasina-led Awami League government, Ali served in the Health Sector Reform Commission of the Yunus Ministry. The commission, led by chairperson AK Azad Khan, submitted its report to Chief Adviser Muhammad Yunus in May 2025. The commission recommended the government allocate 15 percent of the national budget to healthcare and create a permanent "Bangladesh Health Commission".
