= Fasihuddin Mahtab =

Bangladeshi researcher, technocrat and former minister

- ফসিউদ্দিন মাহতাব

Minister of Finance
- In office 12 February – 24 March 1982
- President: Abdus Sattar
- Prime Minister: Shah Azizur Rahman

Minister of Agriculture
- In office 28 November 1981 – 11 February 1982
- President: Abdus Sattar
- Prime Minister: Shah Azizur Rahman

Minister of Planning
- In office 15 April 1979 – 27 November 1981
- President: Ziaur Rahman; Abdus Sattar (acting)
- Prime Minister: Shah Azizur Rahman

State Minister of Agriculture and Forest
- In office 29 June 1978 – 6 April 1979
- President: Ziaur Rahman
- Prime Minister: Mashiur Rahman (acting)

Personal details
- Born: Chapai Nawabganj, Rajshahi Division, Bangladesh
- Died: 22 September 2008 London, United Kingdom
- Resting place: Banani Graveyard, Dhaka, Bangladesh
- Party: Bangladesh Nationalist Party
- Spouse: Hajera Mahtab
- Parent: Mahtabuddin Sarker (father)

Fasihuddin Mahtab (Bengali: ডঃ ফসিউদ্দিন মাহতাব), also spelt Fashiuddin Mahtab, was a Bangladeshi researcher, social worker and the secretary-general of BIRDEM and Diabetic Association of Bangladesh, as well as a member of President Ziaur Rahman's advisory council and later technocrat minister. He was also the son-in-law of BIRDEM founder Muhammad Ibrahim, who was also a member of the advisory council.

== Career ==
In late 1970s, Mahtab served as a minister of state for agriculture during Ziaur Rahman's presidency before being promoted to cabinet minister. He served variously as Planning Minister, Agriculture Minister and Finance Minister as a member of the Bangladesh Nationalist Party (BNP) in the 2nd legislative session of the Jatiya Sangsad.

== Personal life ==
Mahtab was born to Bangladeshi politician and magistrate and East Pakistani MP of the national assembly Mahtabuddin Sarker. He was married to Ibrahim's daughter Hajera Mahtab.

== Books ==
- Green Haauz Protikriya o Bangladeshe Tar Probhab (transl. Greenhouse Reaction and Its Effect on Bangladesh)
- Report on the Agricultural Census of Bangladesh

== Death and burial ==
Mahtab died on September 22, 2008, at Leeds Hospital in London and was buried at the Banani Graveyard in Dhaka.
