= University of Chittagong Library =

Central library of the University of Chittagong

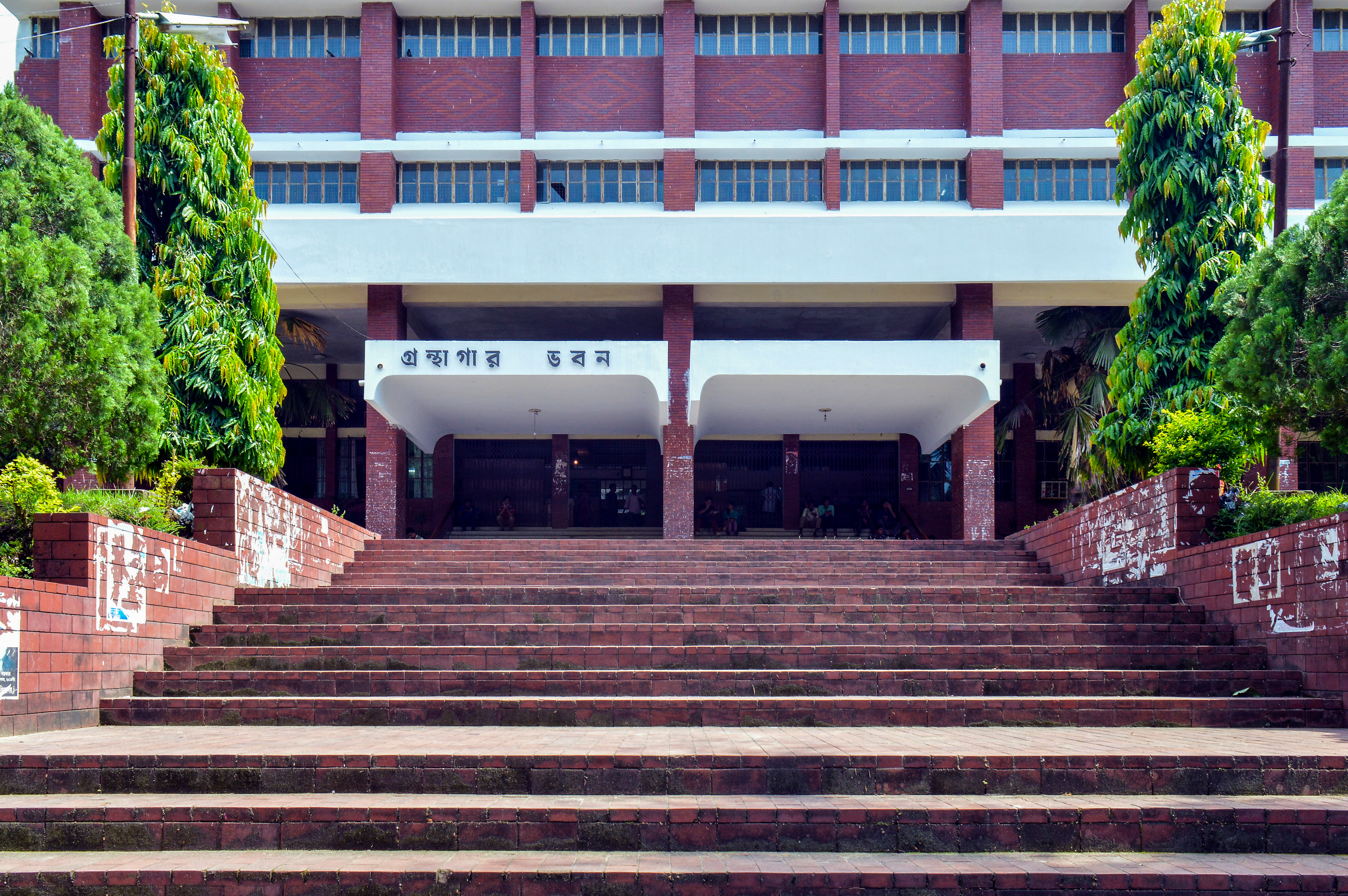
- Library building
- 22.47065823°N 91.78469896°E
- Location: Chittagong University Road, Fatehpur, Hathazari, Bangladesh
- Type: Subscription library
- Established: November 18, 1966
- Service area: University of Chittagong campus

Collection
- Items collected: Books, journals, newspapers, magazines, databases, maps, and manuscripts
- Size: Around 400,000

Other information
- Director: Iftekhar Uddin Chowdhury
- Employees: 86+ (2010)
- Parent organization: University of Chittagong
- Website: library.cu.ac.bd

The University of Chittagong Library is the central library of the University of Chittagong. It is the first and largest library in Chittagong, established in 1966. Currently, the library holds a collection of over 400,000 items. The library is managed and operated under the authority of the University of Chittagong.

It is one of the major research libraries in Bangladesh. The library holds a diverse range of printed and digital resources in various languages and formats. These include books, manuscripts, journals, newspapers, magazines, databases, research works, encyclopedias, dictionaries, handbooks, manuals, and maps.

Among its notable collections are ancient manuscripts written between 100 and 250 years ago on materials such as palm leaves, handmade tulat paper, tree bark, and bamboo slips. These manuscripts are written in Bengali, Sanskrit, Pali, Arabic, Persian, and Urdu. Another significant collection includes nearly 3,500 rare periodicals published between 1872 and 1953, gathered by renowned literary scholar Abdul Karim Sahitya Bisharad.

== Location ==
The library is situated in the Chittagong University campus, in Fatehpur Union of Hathazari Thana, approximately 22 kilometers (14 miles) north of Chittagong city. It stands beside the Shaheed Minar and to the west of the IT Building. In front of the library is the Faculty of Arts and Humanities, while the Chittagong University Central Students' Union (CHAKSU) building is located to the south. To the west of the library lies the Chittagong University Museum.

== History ==
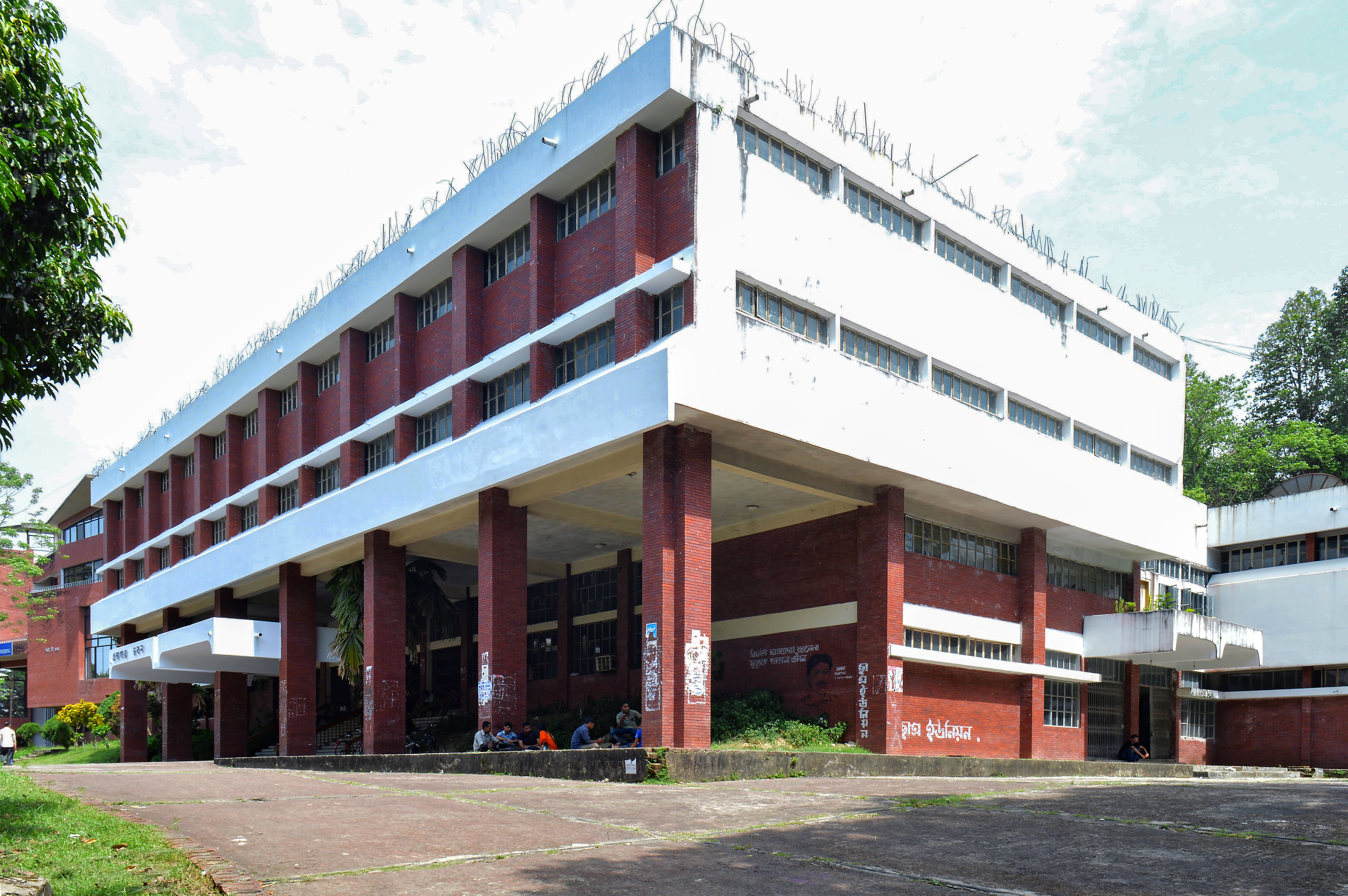
Library building in 2015

The Chittagong University Library began its journey on 18 November 1966 with just 300 books, housed in a room measuring 1,200 square feet (110 m^{2}) on the ground floor of the then Faculty of Arts building. In 1968, the library was moved to a small space within the Faculty of Humanities and Social Sciences (now the Faculty of Social Sciences), located on the south side of the current administrative building (Mallik Building). At that time, it had grown to a collection of about 14,000 books. Eventually, the temporary library was relocated to its current building. However, in December 1973, it was temporarily shifted back to the administrative building for a brief period. Today, the library spans approximately 56,700 square feet (5,270 m^{2}), making it the largest and most modern library in the Chittagong region. The present library building, featuring modern mosaic flooring, was officially inaugurated in 1990 by then Vice-Chancellor Alamgir Mohammad Sirajuddin.

In the 2006–2007 fiscal year, the library received an allocation of approximately 3.8 million BDT. Previously, its budget had reached up to 12 million BDT. As of 2005, the library's collection included 8,750 books, 1,200 bound journals, 150 theses, 120 CD-ROMs, and around 450 local and international periodicals.

== Administration ==
The library is managed by a 14-member committee chaired by the Pro-Vice Chancellor and includes the deans of all faculties of the university. The librarian serves as the member-secretary of this committee. This committee formulates all library-related policies and provides necessary guidance for its operations as needed over time.

Since the library's establishment, a total of ten librarians have served during different periods. The first founding Assistant Librarian was Ataur Rahman, who held the position from 31 October 1966 to 16 October 1968.

== Building ==
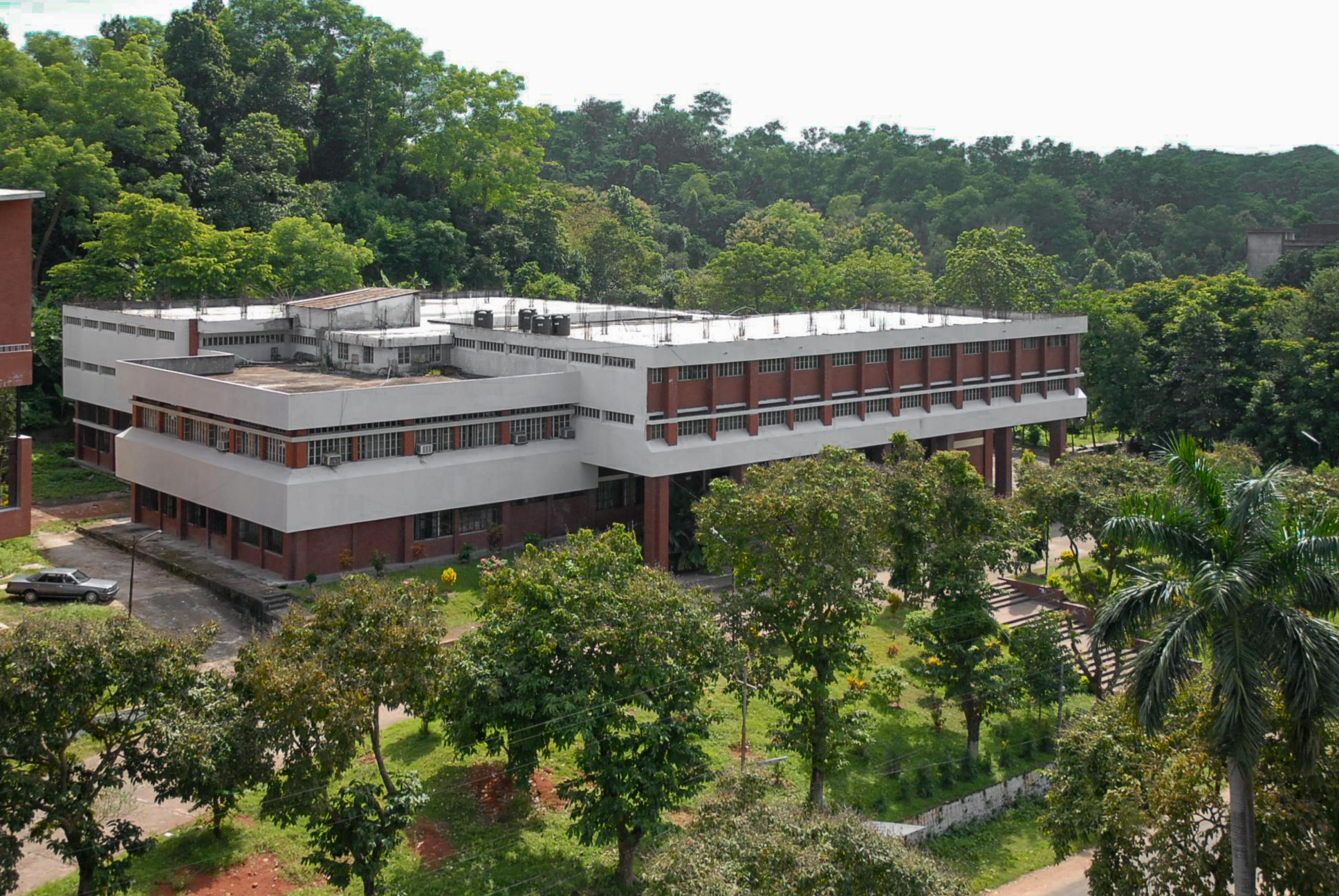
View of the library building from the university administrative building

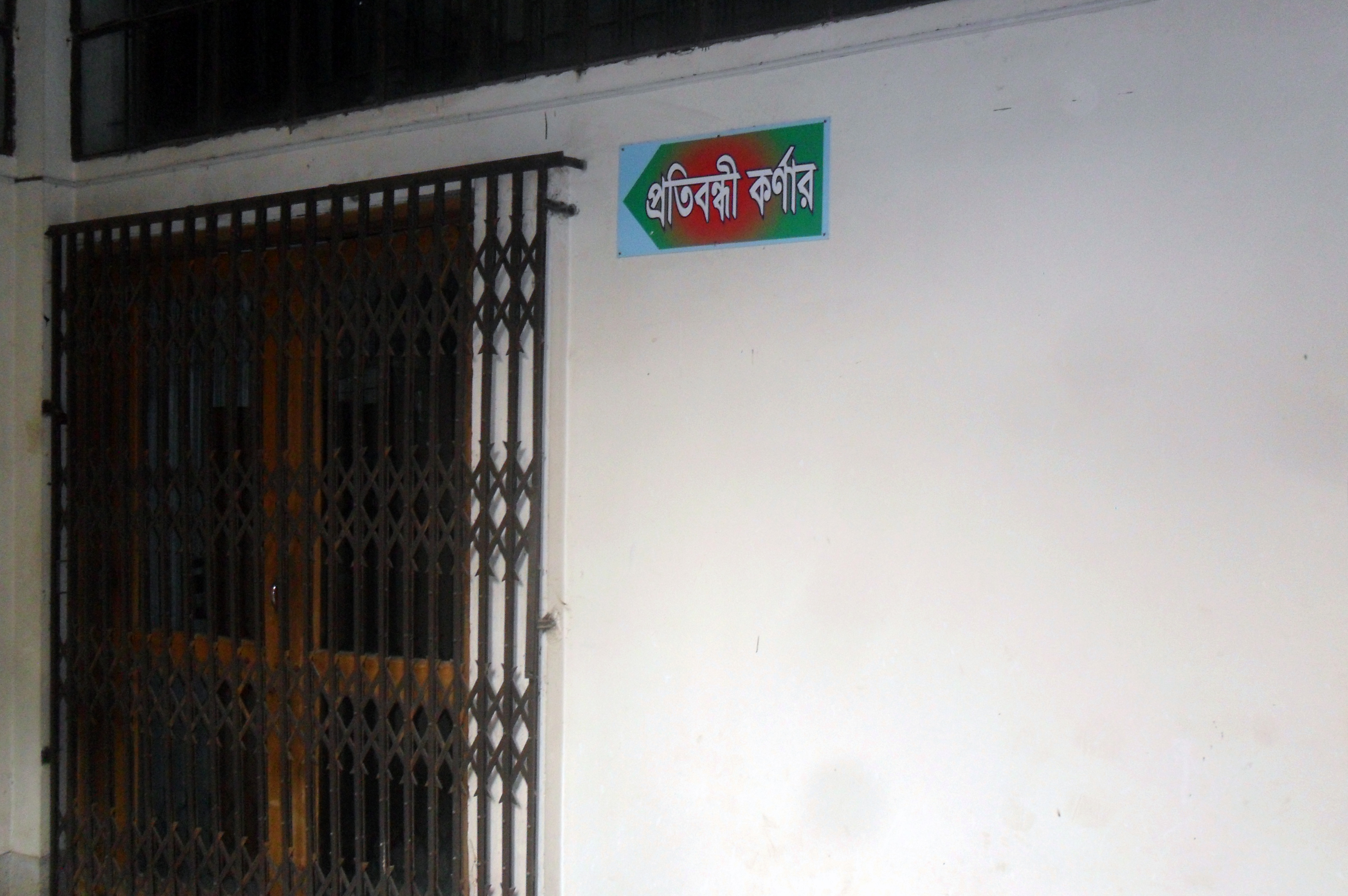
Reading room for students with disabilities

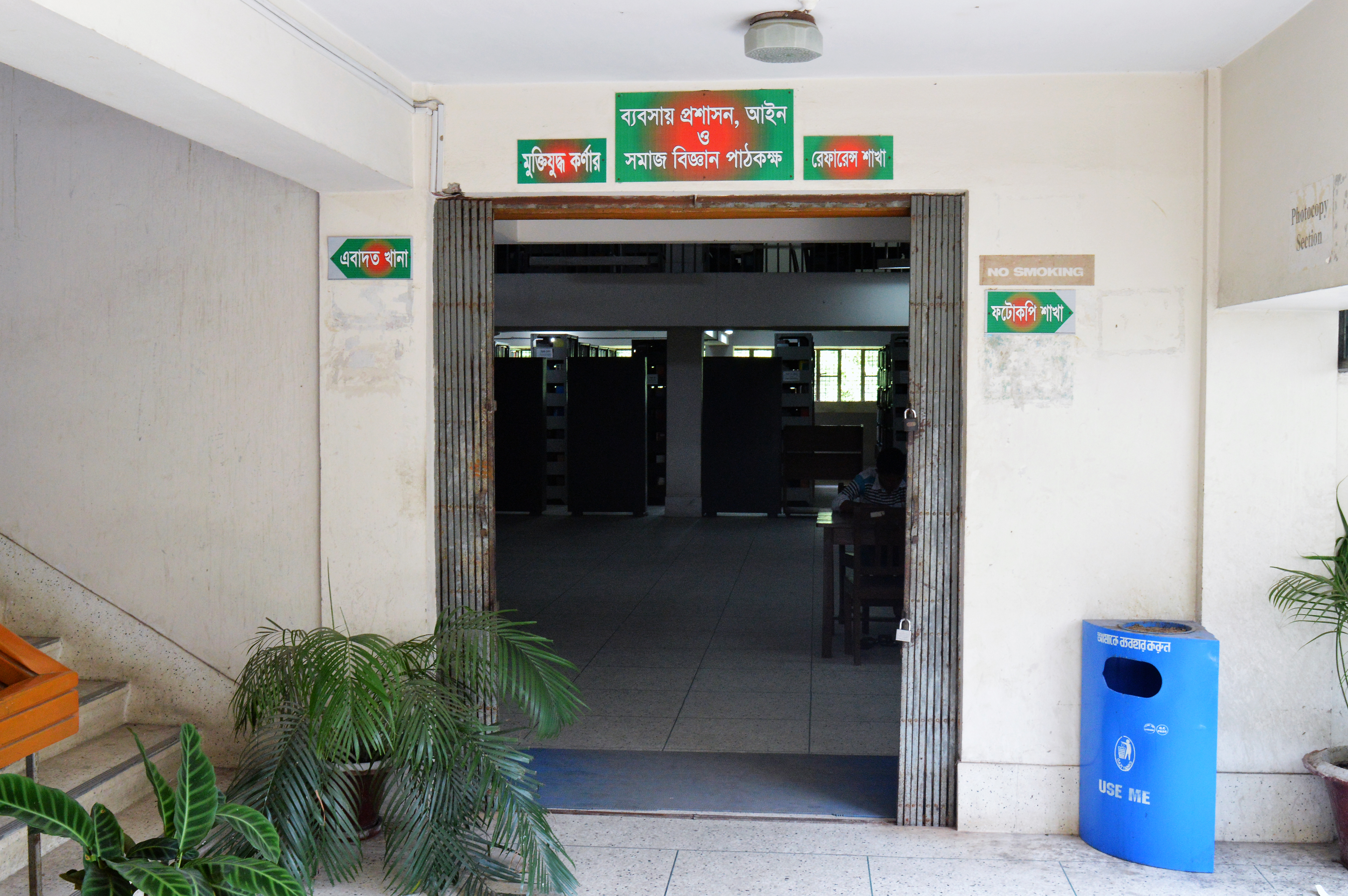
Liberation War Corner and other sections

The library is housed in a three-story building, featuring faculty-specific reading rooms. Each reading room includes a separate section for faculty members. Additionally, there are 24 research rooms designated for MPhil and PhD researchers.

The ground floor contains the administrative section, library office, establishment unit, processing section, binding section, lending section, arts reading room, and an auditorium for meetings and symposiums. There are also reading rooms for students of the Faculty of Arts, an auditorium, a daily newspaper reading section, and the security unit.

The second floor accommodates separate reading rooms for science, business administration, law, and social sciences. It also houses sections for rare books and manuscripts, archived newspapers, a photocopy section, a computer lab, and an internet room.

The mezzanine floor (an intermediate level between two main floors) includes the reference section, journals and periodicals section, and a research room. In 2016, a corner named after former vice-chancellor Professor Dr. R. I. Chowdhury was established. This corner contains 1,009 books and 477 journals from his personal collection. In 2018, a "Bangabandhu Corner" was established in the library. In 2019, a cyber center was also added to the library.

=== Liberation War Corner ===
The Liberation War Corner, established in 2009, aims to support the study of the 1971 Liberation War. It was set up under the initiative of then Vice-Chancellor Abu Yusuf Alamer. The section includes books and journals on the Liberation War, along with a collection of rare photographs. Currently, it houses approximately 1,130 books. The corner consists of two sections, with the upper section providing 20 seats and the lower section offering 60 seats arranged in two rows. Opposite the Liberation War Corner are two science reading sections.

=== Reading Room for Students with Disabilities ===
In 2011, the university library introduced a dedicated reading room for students with disabilities from various departments. The room is equipped with facilities for reading through the Braille system. Approximately 205 books are available in this section, along with internet access. However, due to limited attendance from students with disabilities, the room is currently inactive.

== Sections ==
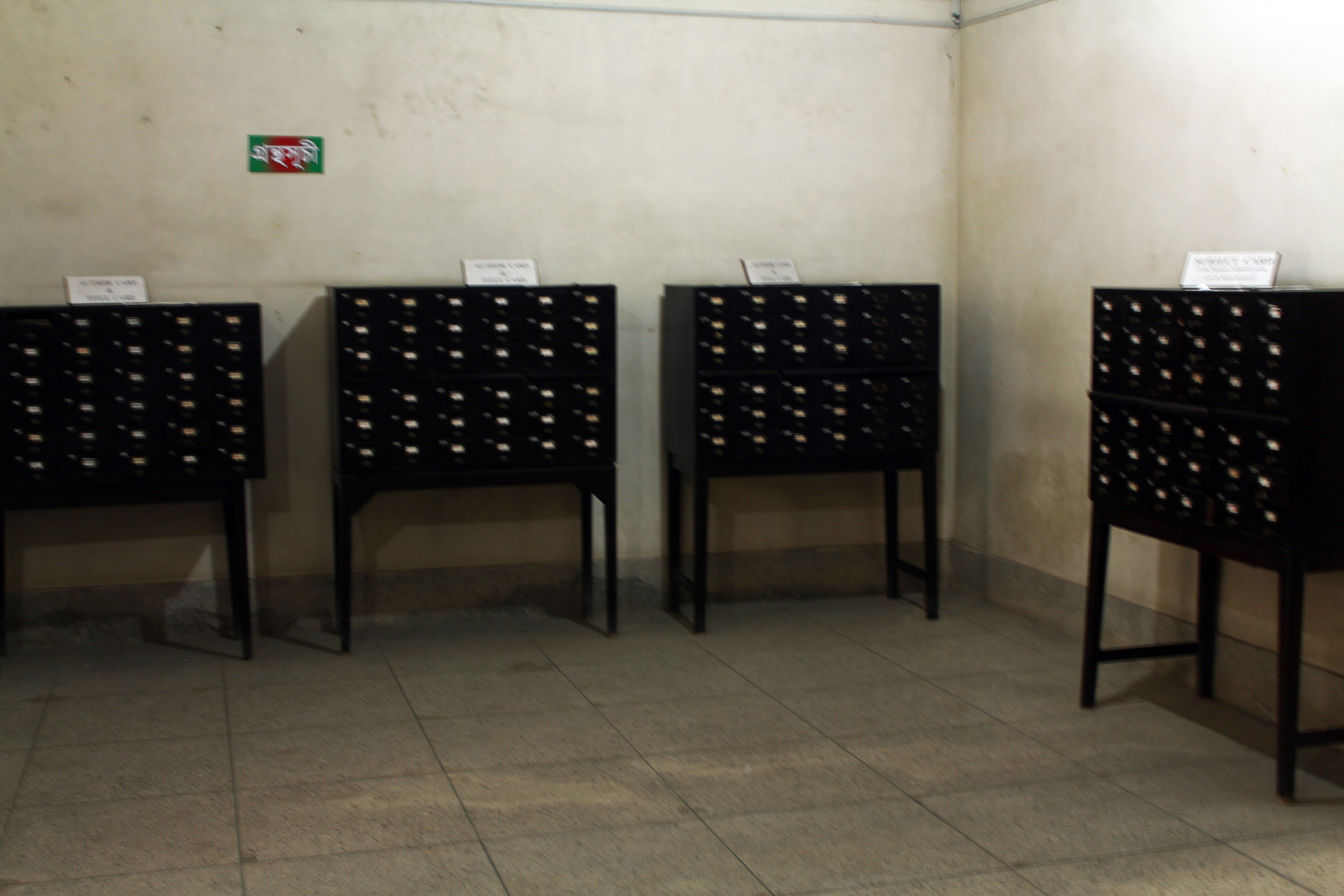
Card Catalog

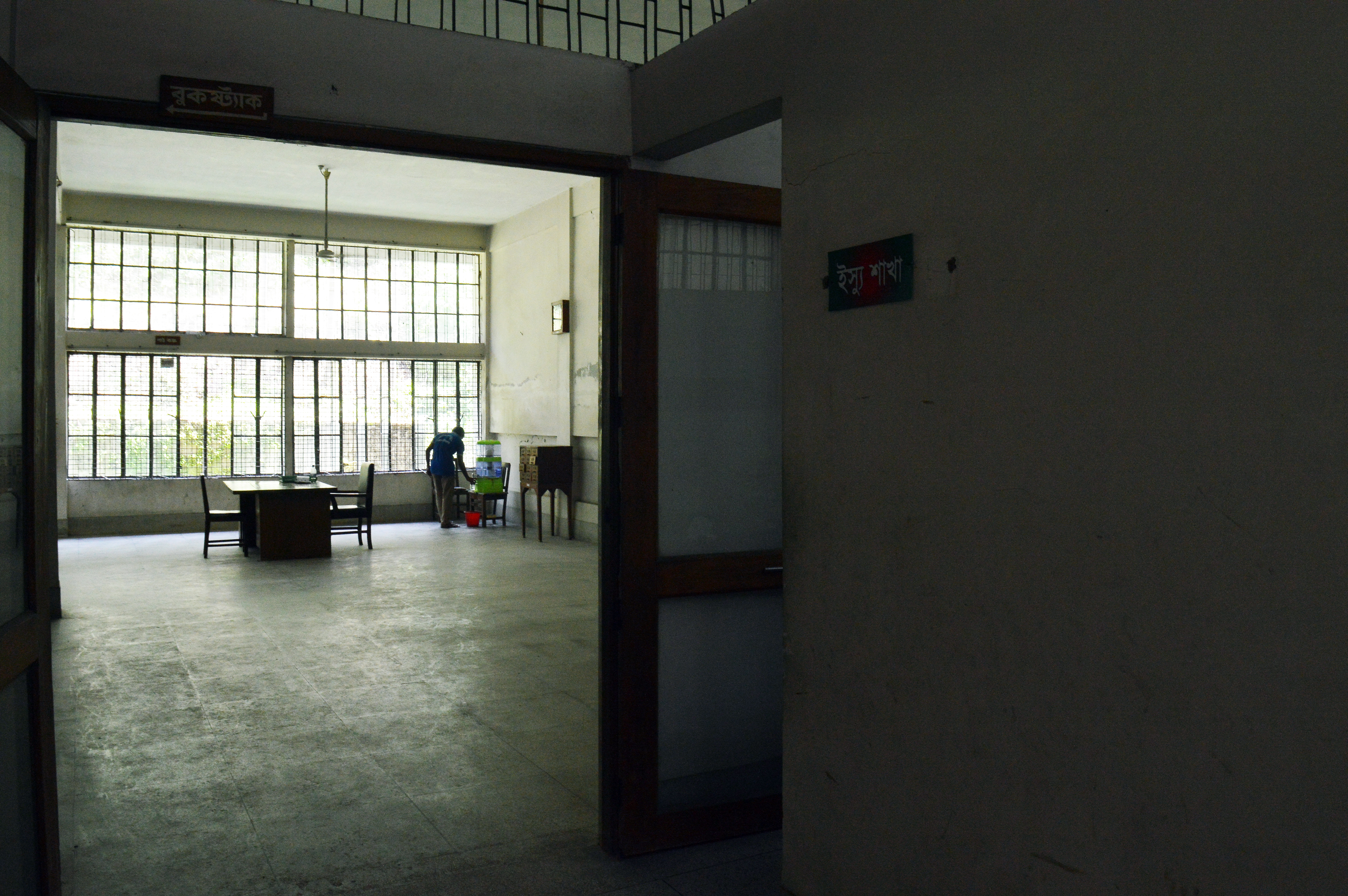
Book Stack and Issue Section

The library's activities are primarily conducted through the following sections:

Establishment Section
Responsible for handling all institutional administrative activities.

Acquisition Section
Manages the collection of local and foreign books, periodicals, journals, and other materials.

Binding Section
After materials such as books, journals, and research papers are collected, they are bound as needed within this section.

Processing Section
Once items are collected and bound, the addition process begins. This includes cataloging, classification, typing, and spine labeling. This section is also responsible for assessing the value of lost books.

Book Issue Section
This section handles the issuing and return of books to university teachers, students, staff, and researchers. It also maintains daily records of book issues and returns. Books must be returned within a specified period.

== Collection ==
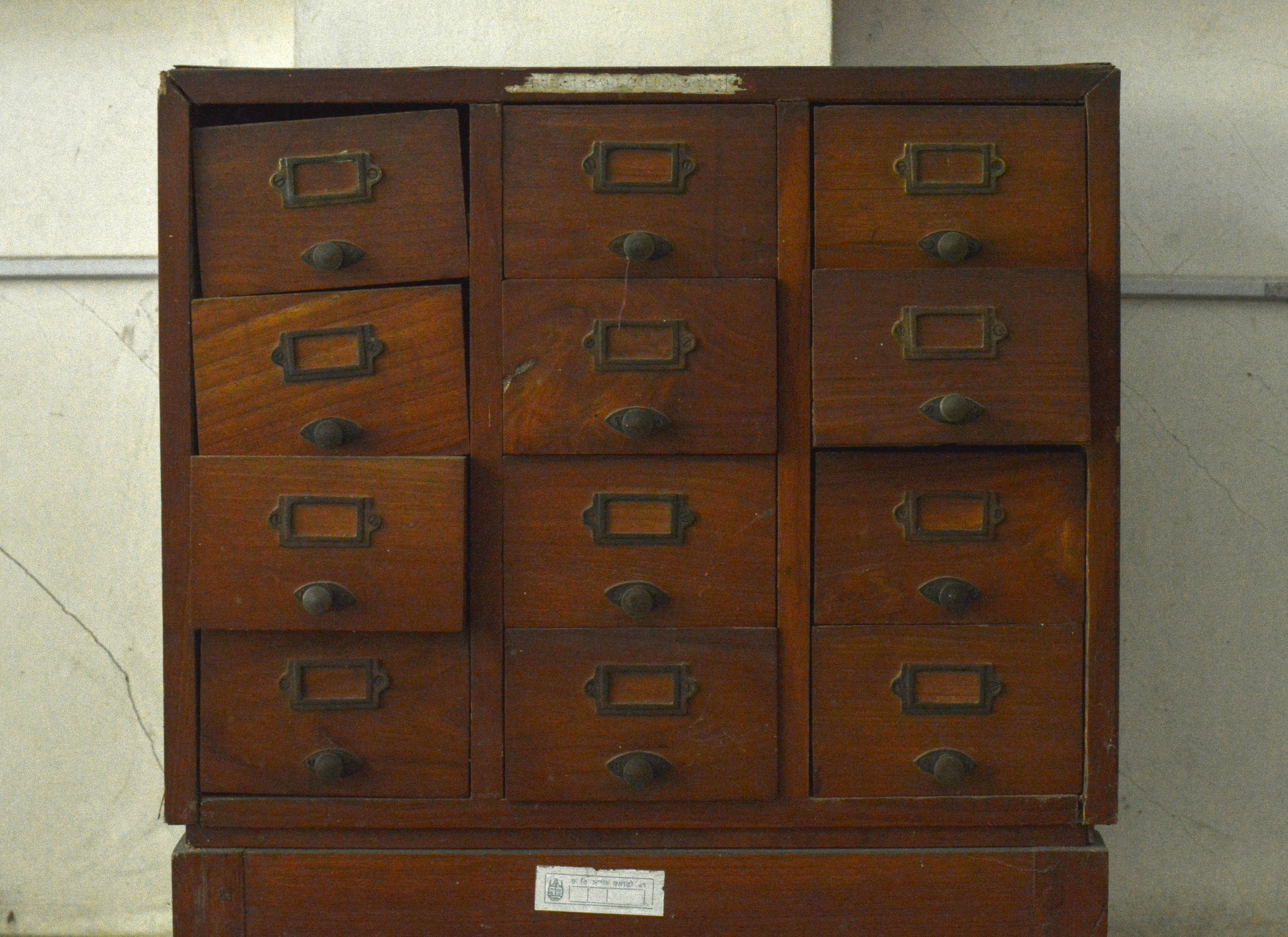
Card catalog

The library's collected reading materials are divided into five main sections: general collection, journal collection, reference collection, thesis collection from the Chittagong University administration, and the rare books and manuscripts section.

The administrative section is located on the ground floor of the library building, which also houses the librarian's office, establishment section, processing section, binding section, circulation section, as well as reading rooms for students of the Faculty of Arts, an auditorium, and a daily newspaper reading room. Additionally, there are separate reading rooms for the faculties of Arts, Science, Commerce, Social Science, and Law, along with subject-specific book collections. The building also includes the manuscripts and rare books section, photocopy section, and computer lab. On the mezzanine floor (a low level between two main floors), there are the reference section, journal and periodical section, internet service room, and research room. There are also separate reading rooms and associated collections for various local and foreign periodicals, rare books, and the reference section. The journal section preserves both recent and archived national and international periodicals, arranged using the DDC system, with approximately 32,000 bound periodicals stored here.

The reference section contains research reports, encyclopedias, dictionaries, handbooks, manuals, almanacs, globes, NGO publications, materials from NERA, ILO, UNESCO, World Bank, IMF, UNICEF, BBS, and university publications. The library houses more than 200,000 national and international books, magazines, and journals. Among them are about 15,000 journals and 2,000 research papers.

=== Rare Books, Manuscripts, and Archived Newspapers Section ===
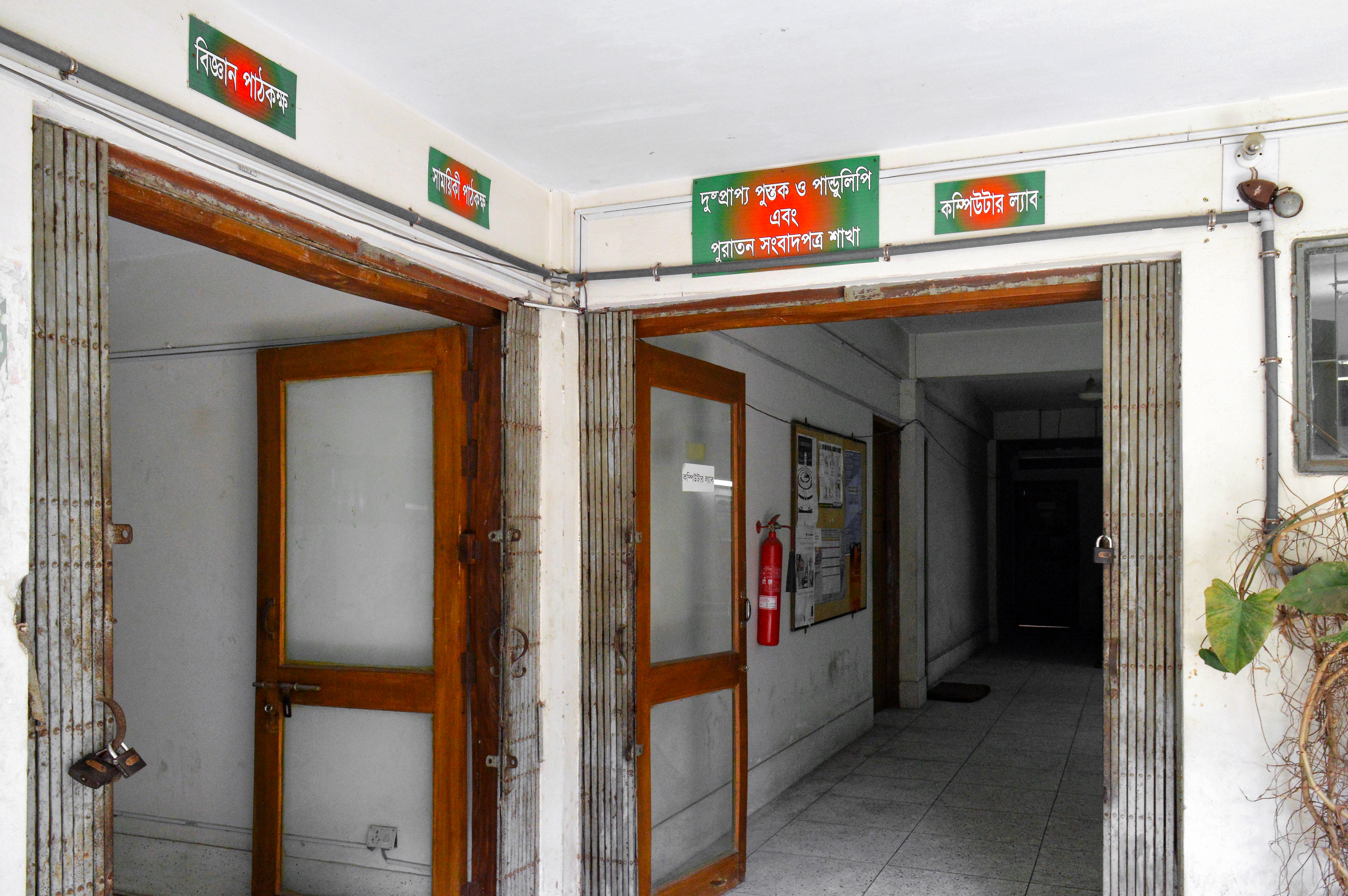
Rare books, manuscripts, and archived newspapers section on the second floor

The rare books, manuscripts, and archived newspapers section preserves valuable research materials, including ancient manuscripts, rare documents, books, journals, dailies, and important publications issued by the university. The section was initially established with a collection of manuscripts, books, and materials gathered by collector Abdus Sattar Chowdhury. It contains 565 manuscripts written in Bengali, Sanskrit, Pali, Arabic, Persian, and Urdu, inscribed on ancient palm-leaf, tanpothi, handmade tulut paper, palm leaves, and bamboo strips. These manuscripts are estimated to have been transcribed between 100 and 250 years ago. Among them are: Gole Hormuz Khan by Safar Ali, Bijoy Hamza by Goyas, Moniul Bedayat by Jinnat Ali, Har Gaurir Puthi by Syed Ghazi, Dhormo Bibad by Hamidullah Khan, and Mahabharat by Paragal Khan.

There are also rare copies of the Quran, Hadith, and Islamic jurisprudence texts. This section holds more than 200 rare printed manuscripts. Over 3,000 books on philosophy, science, history, literature, social sciences, religion, and other subjects are preserved here. Later, the collection was enriched with donations from Munshi Abdul Karim Sahityabisharad, Professor Dr. Abdul Karim (former Vice-Chancellor of Chittagong University), Professor Proctor Abdul Gafur, Ibn Golam Nabi, Babu Kashem Chandra Rakshit, Rashid Al Farooqi, and Professor Dr. Bhuiyan Iqbal.

==== Magazines and Periodicals ====
In addition to the university's own collection, the library holds around 3,500 old periodicals donated by Abdul Karim Sahityabisharad, published between 1872 and 1953. These include: Anjali, Anusandhan, Purba Pakistan, Aryabarta, Simanta, Purabi, Panchajanya; Chattogram-based Sadhana; Bharati; R. Islam, Islam Pracharak, Alo, Education Gazette, Saptahik Bartabahak, Chhayabithi, Dhaka Review, Purnima, Prakriti, Pratibha, Bhandar, Probasi, Bangiya Sahitya Parishad, Bangiya Musalman Sahitya Patrika, Agragati, and others.

== Gallery ==
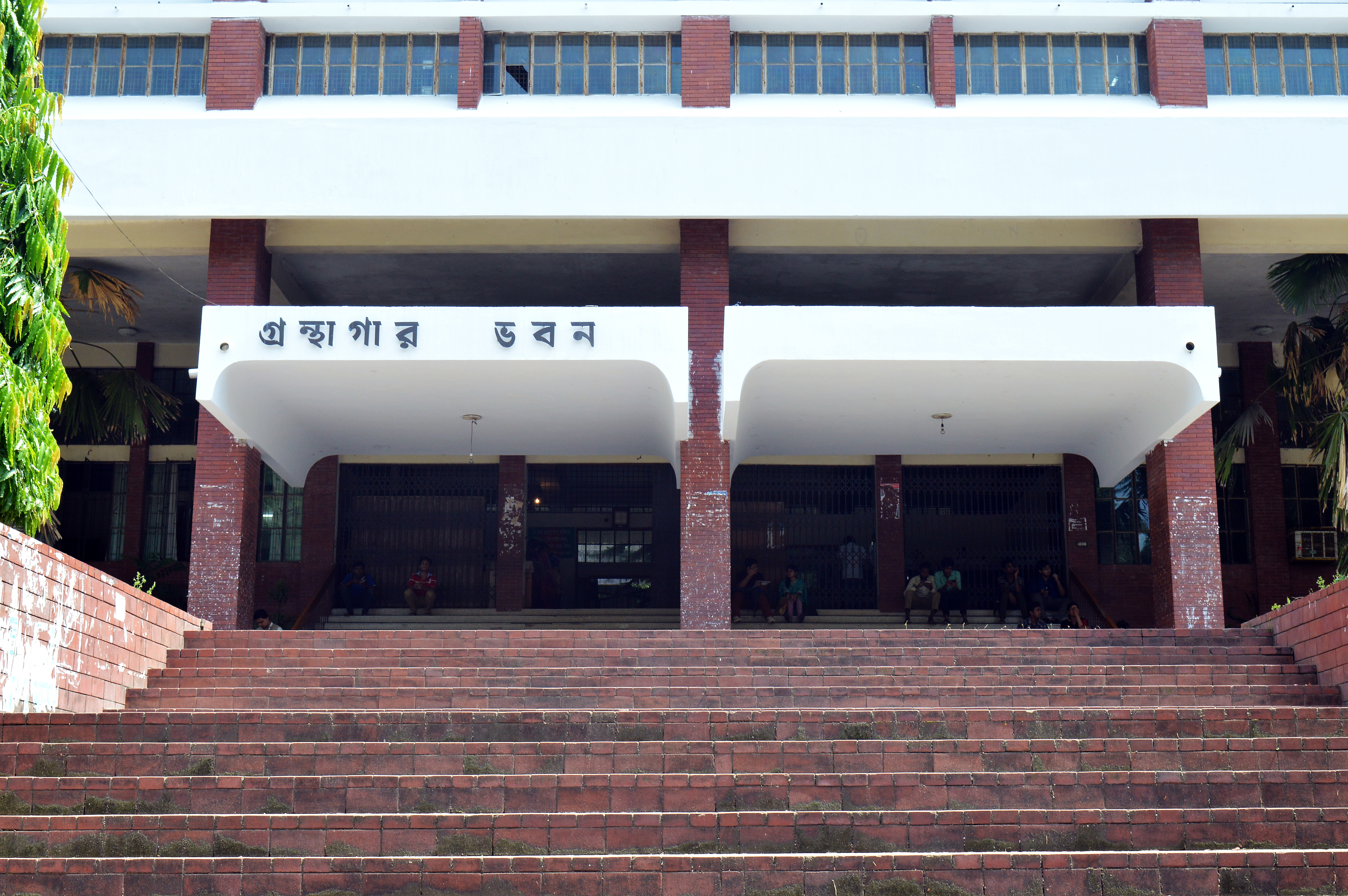
Library building

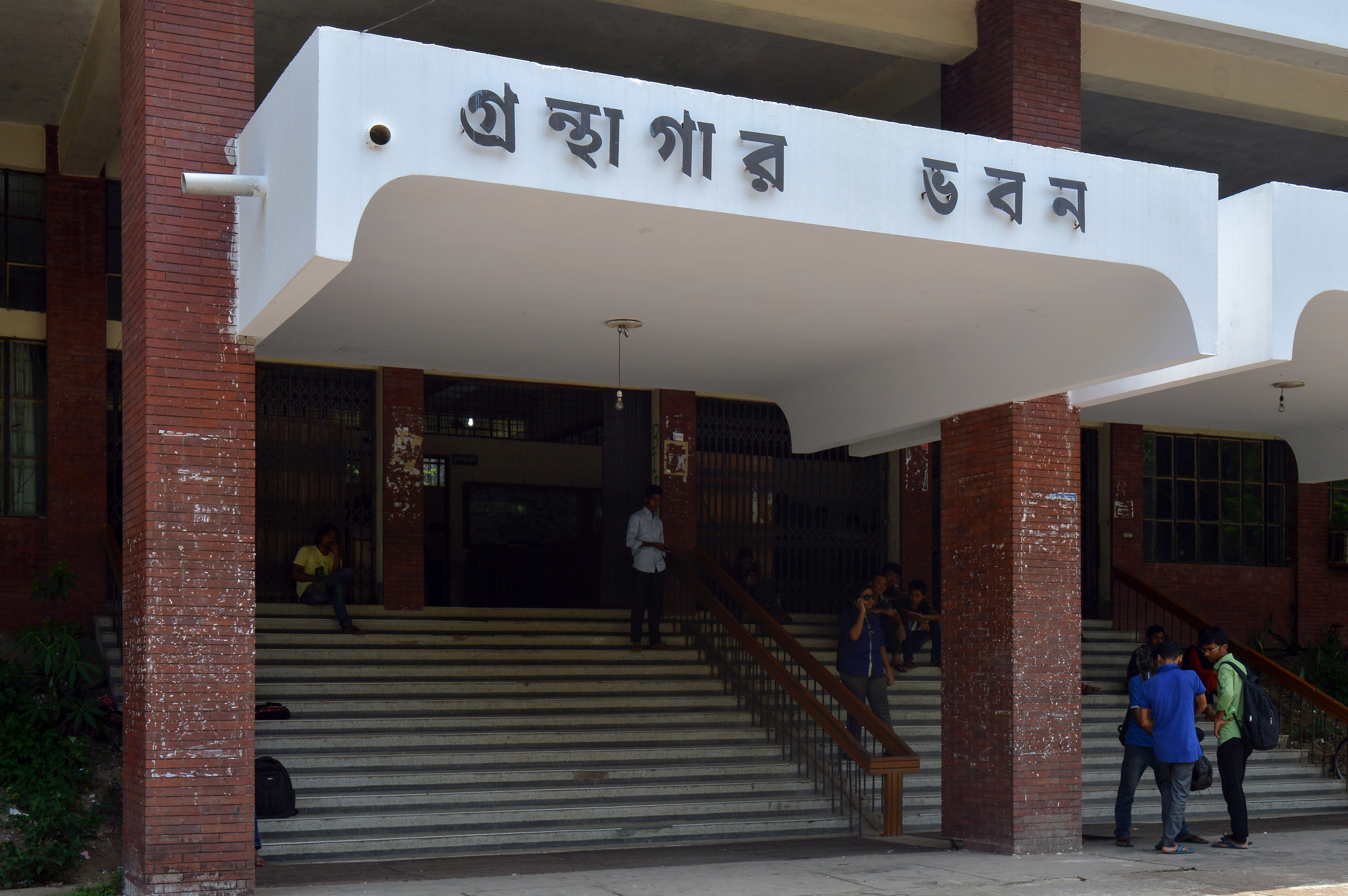
Library building

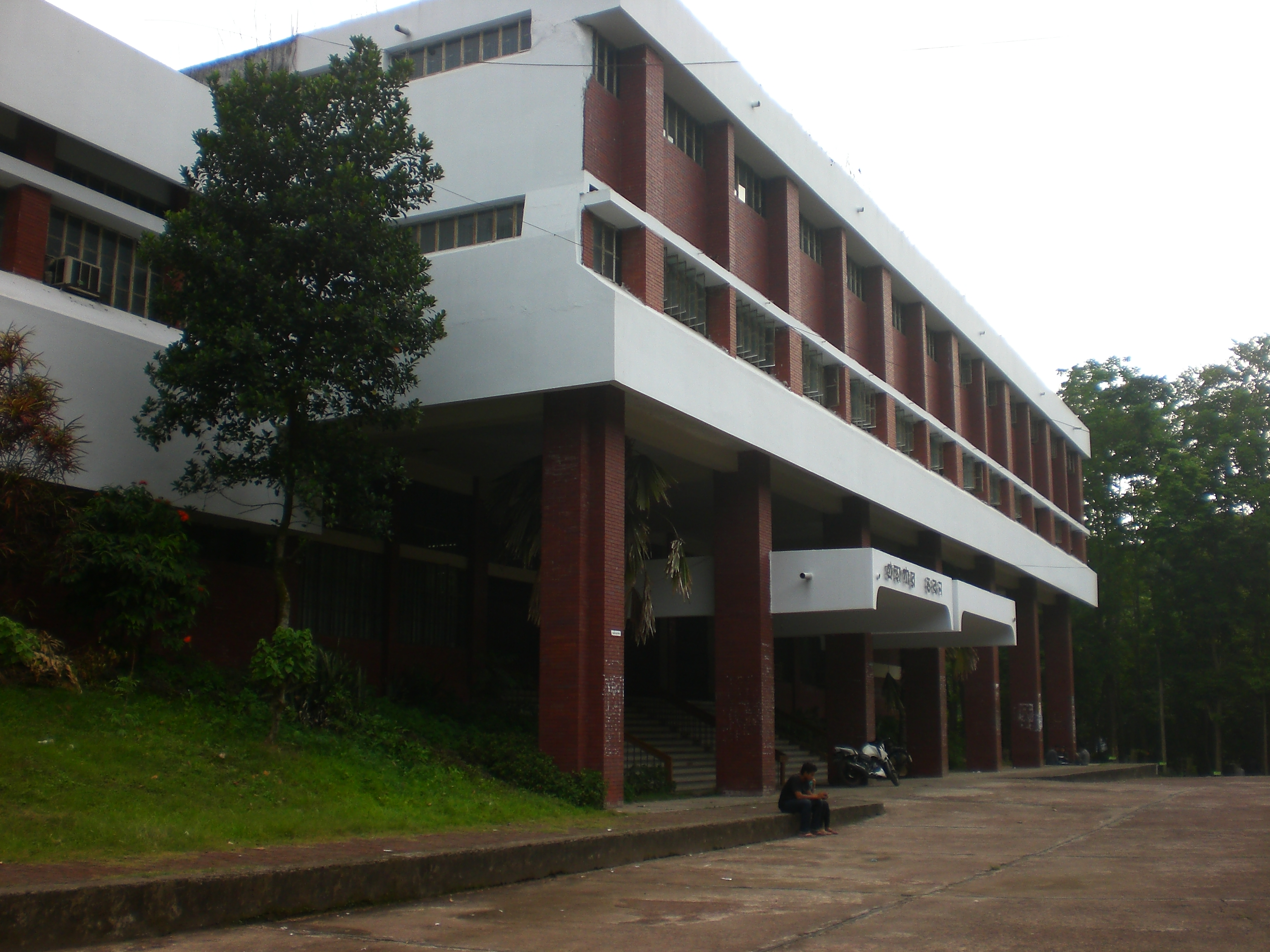
Library building

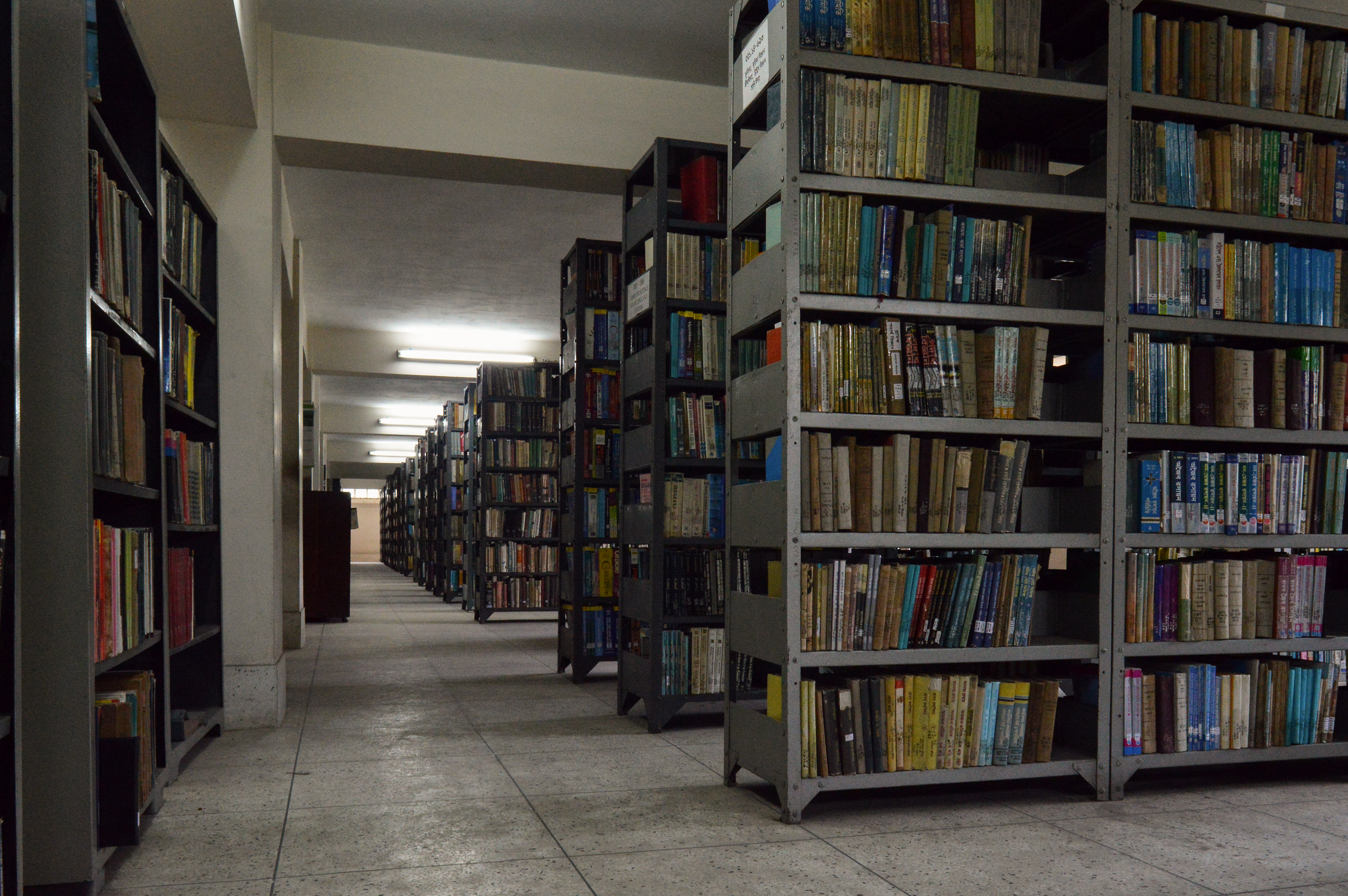
Bookshelves

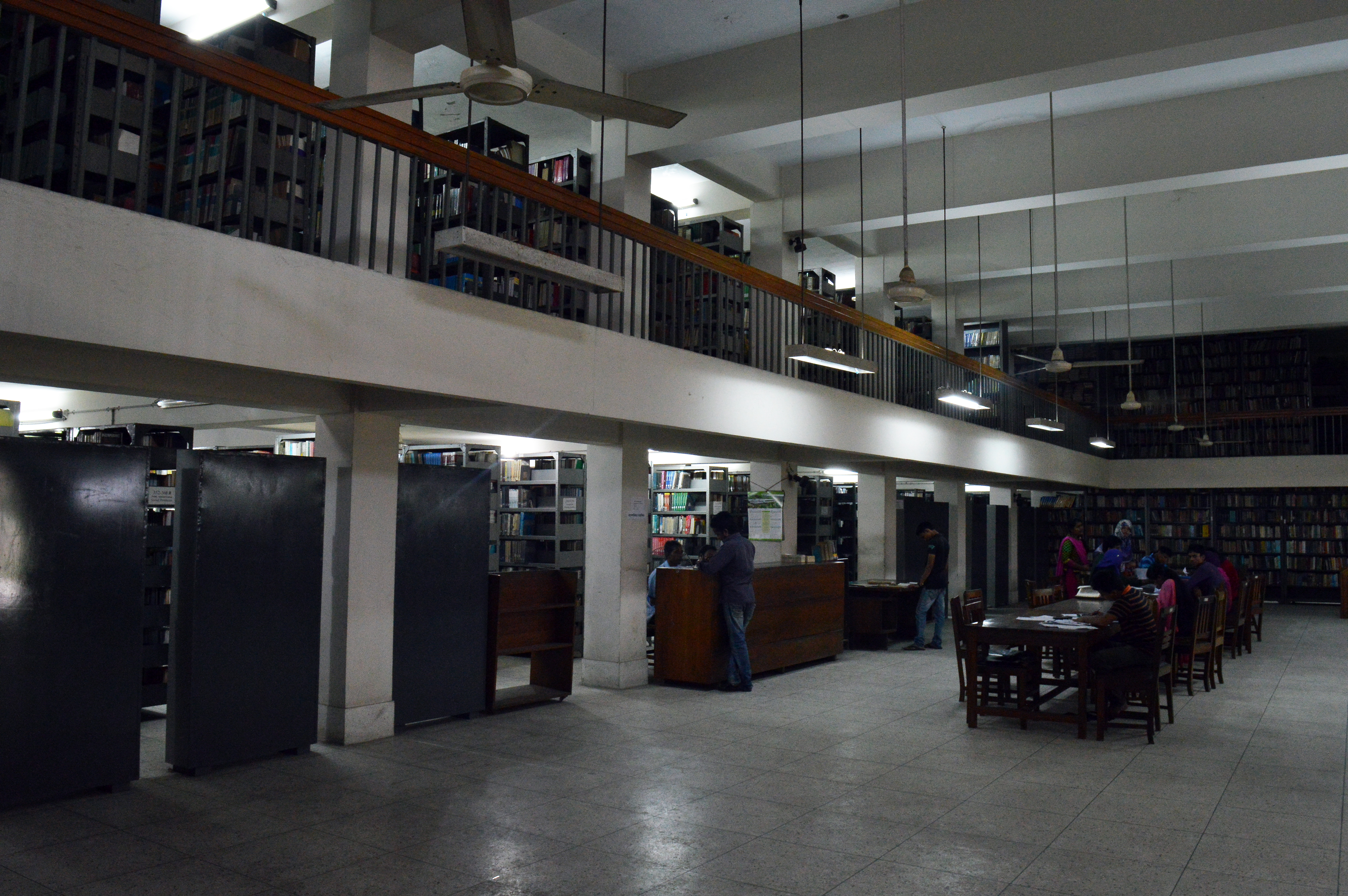
Reading room

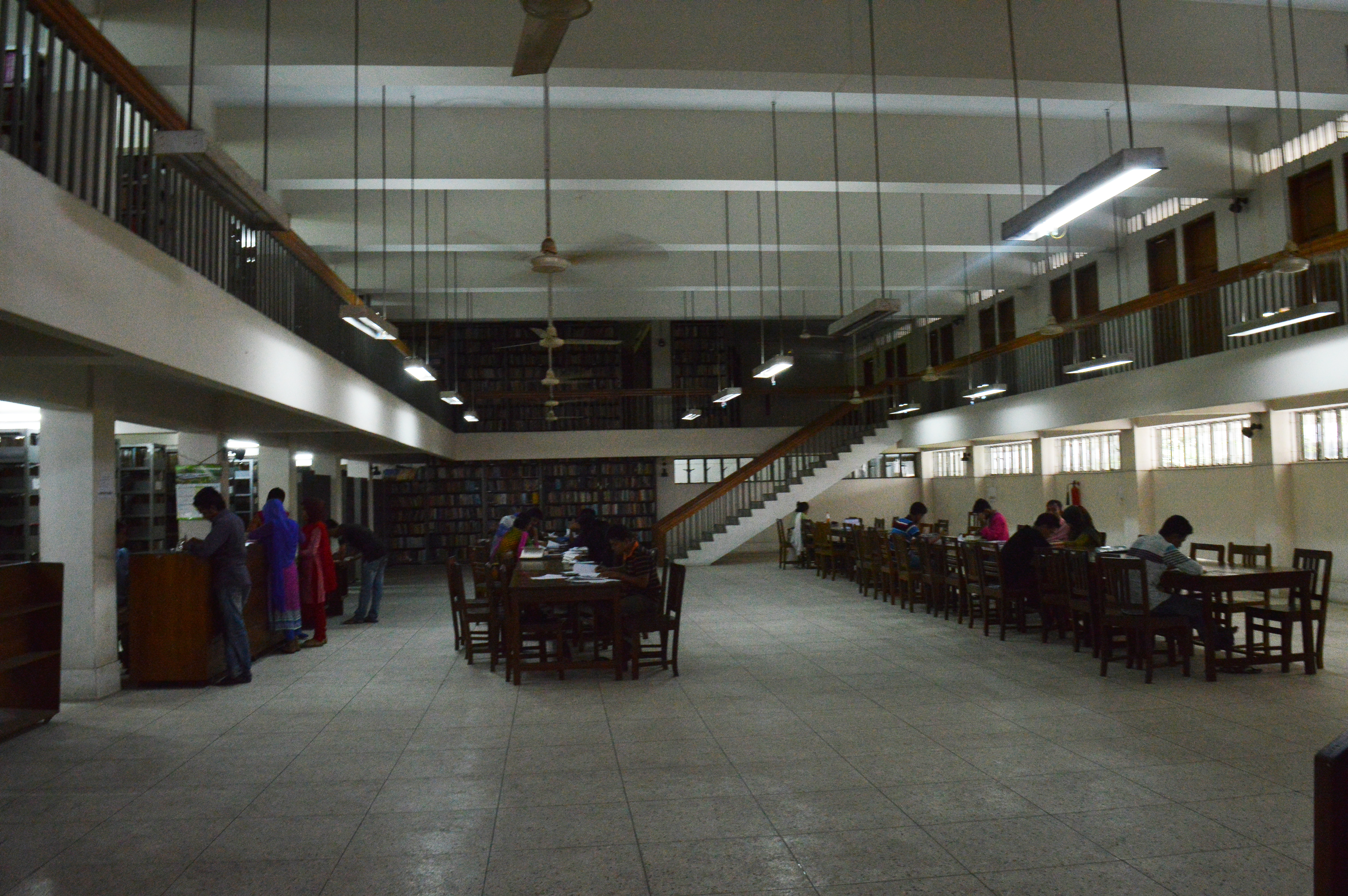
Reading room

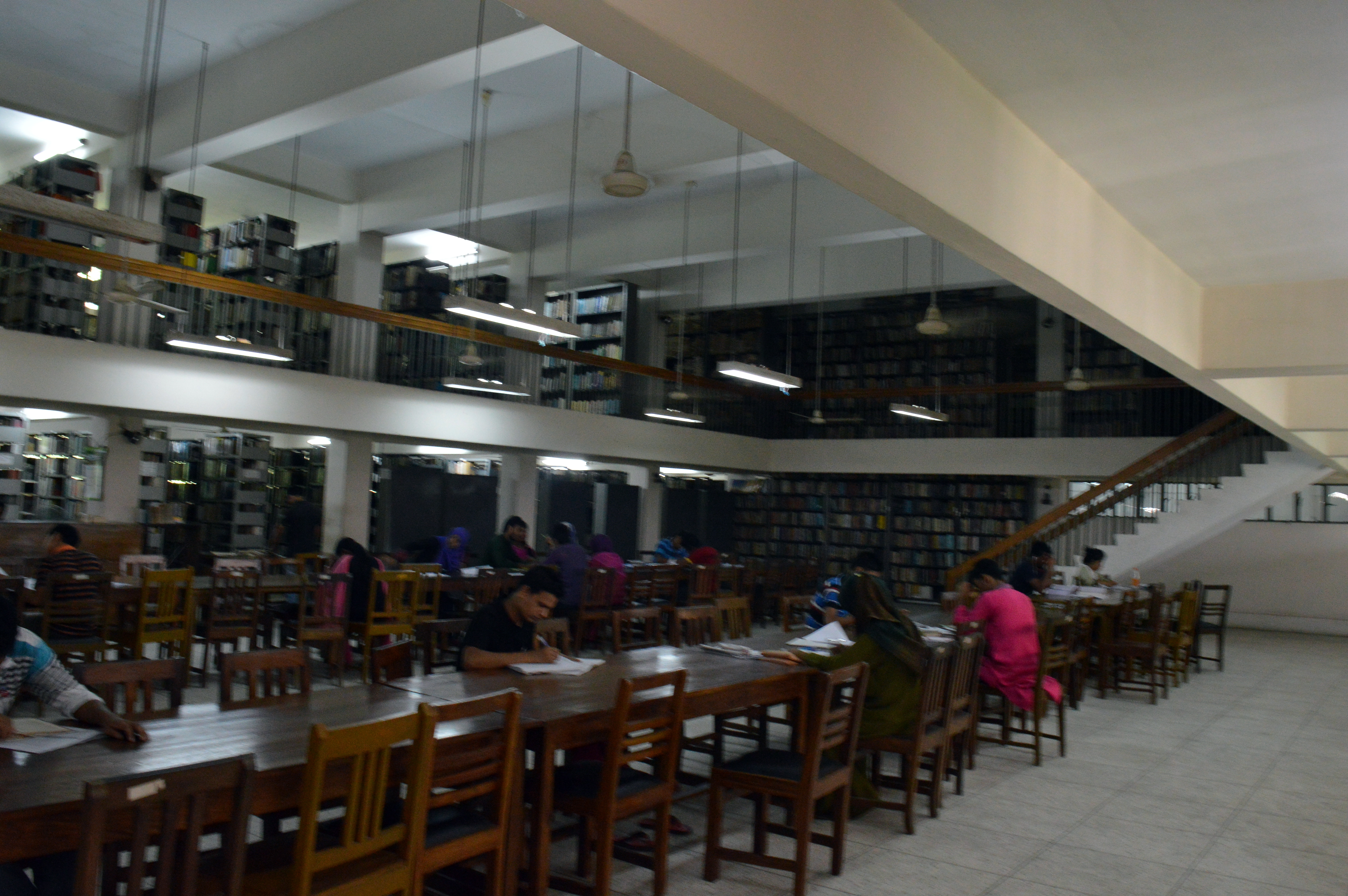
Reading room

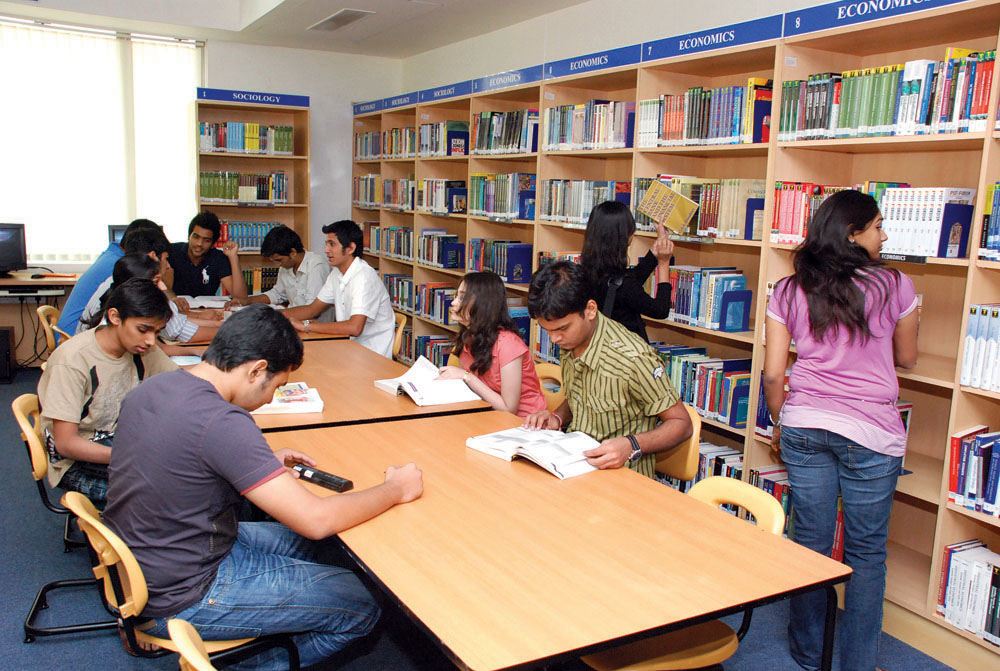
Reading room

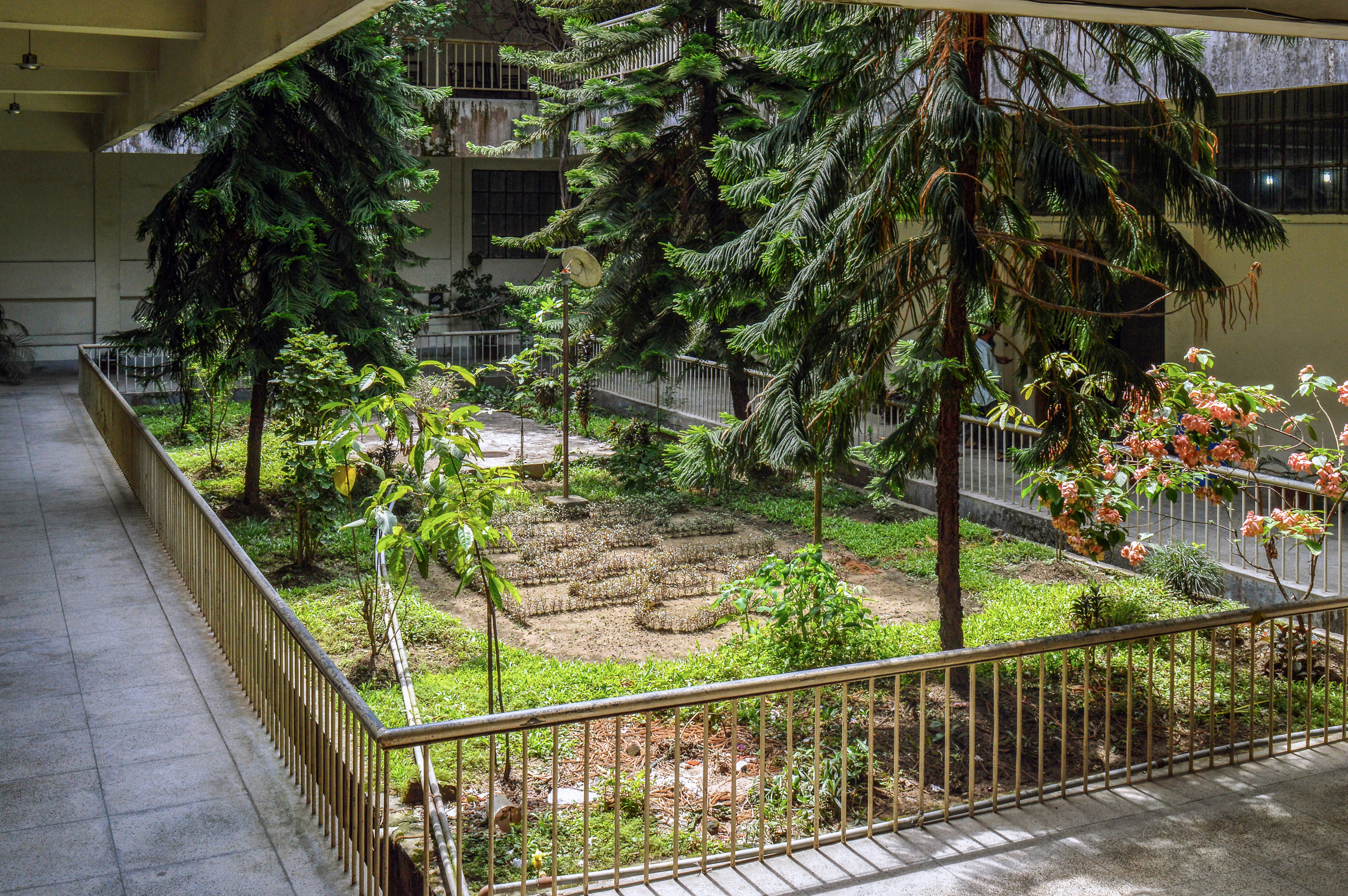
Interior garden of the library

== See also ==
- List of libraries in Bangladesh
- Chittagong City Corporation public library
- University of Chittagong

== Sources ==
- Khaled, Mohammad; Dashgupta, Arun; Haq, Mahbubul, eds. (November 1995). "Chittagong University Library". Urban Life. Hazar Bochhorer Chattogram [A Thousand Years of Chittagong] (35th ed.). Chattogram: M. A. Malek, Dainik Azadi. pp. 309–310.
- Taher, Syed Muhammad Abu (25 September 2010). "Chittagong University Library". In Khan, Amirul Alam; Shishir, Mir Abu Saleh Shamsuddin (eds.). All About Libraries. Chattogram: Aselaro. pp. 74–75.
