= List of libraries in Bangladesh =

Public and private libraries in Bangladesh, both physical and electronic.

== Government libraries ==
=== National libraries ===
- National Archives & National Library of Bangladesh
- National Health Library & Documentation Center Dhaka Bangladesh
- Bangladesh Parliament Library

=== Cabinet libraries ===
- Prime Minister's Office Library, Dhaka
- Ministry of Law, Justice, and Parliamentary Affairs Library
- Ministry of Foreign Affairs Library
- Ministry of Labour and Employment Library
- Ministry of Education Library
- Ministry of Agriculture Library
- Ministry of Shipping Library
- Ministry of Health and Family Welfare Library
- Ministry of Primary and Mass Education Library
- Economic Relations Documentation Centre, Ministry of Finance
- Bangladesh Atomic Energy Commission Library

=== Institutional libraries ===
- Bangla Academy Library
- Bangladesh Bank Library
- Kendriya Muslim Sahitya Sangsad Library, Dorgah gate, Sylhet.
- Bangladesh Institute of Development Studies Library
- United Nations Information Centre, Dhaka

=== Public libraries ===
- National Library of Bangladesh
- Khulna Government Public Library
- Jessore Institute Public Library
- Mymensingh Government Public Library
- Islamic Foundation Central Library
- Islamic Foundation Library, Mymensingh
- Manirampur Public Library, Manirampur, Jessore
- world of 71 (Public Library & Resource Centre), Manirampur, Jessore
- Madaripur Government Public Library.
- District Govt. Public Library, Natore See Also

== Educational institutions ==
=== Public university libraries ===
- Dhaka University Central Library
- BANGLADESH UNIVERSITY OF PROFESSIONALS LIBRARY
- Rajshahi University Library
- BUET Central Library
- KUET Central Library
- IBA Library
- MIST Central Library
- CUET Library
- DUET Library
- E-Library, Faculty of Business Studies, University of Dhaka
- Islamic University, Bangladesh Central Library
- IUT Library and Documentation Center
- JahangirNagar University Library
- Chittagong University Library
- Bangabandhu Sheikh Mujib Medical University Library
- Khulna University Central Library
- RUET Central Library
- Shahjalal University of Science and Technology Library
- Jessore Science and Technology University Library
- Sher-e-Bangla Agricultural University Library

=== Private university libraries ===
- Americal International University-Bangladesh Library
- BRAC University Ayesha Abed Library
- Eastern University Library
- Dr. S. R. Lasker Library (East West University Library)
- Green University of Bangladesh Library
- Independent University Library
- International Islamic University Chittagong
- North Bengal International University E-library
- Northern University Bangladesh Library
- North South University Library
- Stamford University, Bangladesh Library
- Southeast University Library
- State University of Bangladesh Library
- United International University Library
- University of Information Technology and Science
- University Of Liberal Arts Bangladesh
- Uttara University Library
- World University of Bangladesh Library
- Leading University Library
- German University Bangladesh Library

=== College libraries ===
- Shahid Khorshed Memorial Library (Mirzapur Cadet College)
- Ideal School and College Library
- Chittagong College Library
- Dhaka College Library
- Government Teachers' Training College Library
- Government Women College Library
- SK. Burhanuddin P.G. College Library
- Govt Titumir College library .

== Non-government libraries ==
- Bir Chandra Ganapathagar, kandirpar, Comilla (Established in 1985)
- Book Centre, Chandpur City
- Friends Library, Kanungopara, Boalkhali, Chittagong (Since-1902)
- Surdhuni Library, Asad Road, Khalilgonj, Kurigram 5600 (Established in December, 2013;)
- Dania Pathagar, South Dania, Dhaka 1236 (Established in 1989)
- Bengal Boi, Dhanmondi, Dhaka 1209 (Established as a bookstore and community space in November 2017)

=== Public libraries ===
- Projonmo - A Contemplative Library, Gazipur, Bangladesh
- Chandpur Public Library, Chandpur City
- Nayla Begum Memorial Public Library (Est. 2020))
- Bishwo Shahitto Kendro Library
- Gonokendor- BRAC Library
- Maruf Sharmeen Smrity Sonstha Library, Zatramura, Rupganj, Narayanganj
- Muslim Institute Library, Mymensingh
- Shudhijon Pathagar, Narayanganj
- Shihipur Public Library, Bogra
- Srisri Pathodyan, 19/50 Rupnagor, Dhaka. Ashraful Alam Siddique. Mob 01711310483
- Killar Andar Islamic Library, Lohagara, Chittagong. Mobile phone- 01835 559712-3
- Woodburn Public Library
- Sylhet Mushtak Chy Public Library, Shahparan,Sylhet. (Est. 2020) Mobile No. 01761 351000
- Durbar Songho Gronthagar, Khalishpur, Khulna
- Kaniz Fatema Jaigirdar Children's Library, Chowhatta,Sylhet. Mobile No. 01315-571433
- Surdhuni Library, Asad Road, Khalilgonj, Kurigram 5600 (Government Registered Library, Reg. No. Kuri-48;)
- Bondhon Gronthagar, Mirpur-14, Dhaka-1206.
- MM Hafiz Memorial Public Library, Madaripur 7900.
- District Govt. Public Library, Natore.
- Scientist.Dr. M.A. Wazed Miah Memorial Library, Mohmmadpur Town Hall, Fall market-3rd floor, Dhaka-1207
- Anirban Library (Est. 1990), Mahmudhati, Paikgacha, Khulna
- Nazrul Public Library, Gopalgonj.

=== Medical libraries ===
- Apollo Hospital Dhaka Library
- Centre for Medical Education Library
- Library and Information Services Unit (LISU) of the ICDDR, B, Chandpur
- WHO Library of Bangladesh
- Bangladesh College of Physicians and Surgeons
- Bangladesh Health Professions Institute - Centre for the Rehabilitation of the Paralysed e-library

=== Other ===
- British Council Library, Bangladesh

== See also ==
- Copyright law of Bangladesh
- Library associations in Bangladesh
- Mass media in Bangladesh
