= University of Science and Technology, Meghalaya =

Private University in Meghalaya, India

- USTM Seal
- Motto in English: Unveiling Excellence
- Type: Private University
- Established: 2011; 15 years ago
- Affiliations: UGC; NAAC; AICTE; NCTE; AIU; NMC; BCI
- Chancellor: Mahbubul Hoque
- Vice-Chancellor: Dr. Gauri Dutt Sharma
- Academic staff: 100+
- Students: 10000+
- Location: Ri-Bhoi, Baridua, Meghalaya, India; 26.101°N 91.845°E
- Campus: Techno City, Killing Road (300 acres) (main campus)
- Nickname: USTM
- Website: www.ustm.ac.in

The University of Science and Technology, Meghalaya (or simply USTM) is a state private university in India located at Ri-Bhoi, in the state of Meghalaya. It is the first State Private University in the entire Northeast India. The University is established through the University of Science and Technology, Meghalaya Act, 2008 of the Government of Meghalaya. This University is a project of Education Research & Development Foundation (ERDF), the largest educational network in the North Eastern region of India. It has been accredited with 'A' by NAAC.

== History ==
The University of Science and Technology, Meghalaya (USTM) has been established under the provisions of University of Science and Technology, Meghalaya Act (No.6 of 2008) enacted by the Legislative Assembly of Meghalaya and notified vide Gazette Notification No. LL(B)87/2008/21, dated 02.12.2008 of Government of Meghalaya. The University is empowered by University Grants Commission (UGC), to award degrees as specified by the UGC under section 22 of the UGC Act, 1956.

== Campus ==
The University is situated on more than 300 acres in Ri-Bhoi District, Meghalaya. It is the largest private university in Northeast India by area.

== Recognition and accreditation ==
USTM is recognised by UGC and approved by AICTE, and NCTE, Ministry of Human Resource Development, Government of India. USTM has also complied to UGC's 12(B) status. The University was also recently Accredited with Grade "A" by NAAC and is amongst the first Private Universities in Northeast India to get an A Grade in its first Cycle itself.

USTM was ranked among the 151-200 band in the National Institutional Ranking Framework (NIRF) 2023. As of August 2023, it is the only private university in the northeastern region to make it to the list.

== Controversy ==
On 22 February 2025, Mahbubul Hoque, Chancellor and founder of the University of Science and Technology, Meghalaya (USTM), was arrested by Assam police from his residence. Authorities stated that the arrest was related to a law and order situation involving allegations of accepting money in exchange for facilitating unfair means during the CBSE Class 12 Physics examination in Sribhumi district. In response to allegations, ERD Foundation principal secretary Mehjabeen Rahman refuted the accusations, stating that the organization was "accused of not giving students an opportunity to cheat in examinations." Rahman characterized the allegations as originating from a handful of students who were dissatisfied with their performance on a physics exam and who may have been prevented from using unfair means by invigilators. Hoque and his institution have previously faced criticism from Assam Chief Minister Himanta Biswa Sarma, including allegations of 'flood jihad' conspiracy. As per reports, he was arrested on Saturday morning by a police team comprising officers from Panbazar Police and the Special Task Force (STF) of the Assam Police. After 2 days of the Chancellor arrest, 5 professors of the University were also got arrested for the same malpractice. The arrest sparked backlash from many people, including several political leaders, who called it another targeted campaign by the Assam administration against Muslims. Congress leader Maskoor Usmani characterized the arrest as the culmination of a politically motivated vendetta by the Chief Minister of Assam, alleging an attempt to undermine USTM, a NAAC-A Grade institution operating under Meghalaya's governmental jurisdiction and University Grants Commission (UGC) academic regulations. Abdul Khaleque, a former Lok Sabha MP and Congress leader from Assam, criticized the arrest and noted that the Assam Chief Minister, Himanta Biswa Sarma, had been publicly critical of Hoque in the preceding months.

== Academics ==
The University is divided into following academic units:

=== School of Biological Sciences ===
- Biotechnology
- Food Science & Technology
- Botany
- Zoology
- Microbiology

=== School of Applied Science ===
- Chemistry
- Physics
- Disaster Management
- Environmental Science
- Geography
- Mathematics

=== School of Social Science & Humanities ===
- English
- Public Administration
- Political Science
- Rural Development
- Library & Information Sciences
- Sociology
- Social Work

=== School of Media Sciences & Cultural Studies ===
- Media Sciences

=== School of Engineering Technology ===
- B Tech Computer Science and Engineering
- B Tech Artificial Intelligence
- B Tech Data Science
- B Tech Electrical and Electronics Engineering
- B Tech Mechanical Engineering
- B Tech Civil Engineering

=== School of Business Science ===
- Economics
- Commerce
- Business Administration

=== Prof. Qoumrul Hoque School of Education ===
- Education
- Psychology
- B.ED

=== School of Law and Research ===
- BALLB
- BBALLB
- LLB
- LLM

== Seat Intake capacity ==
PhD Courses Seat Intake
Sl. No	Name of Programme	Number of Seats
1	Botany	08
2	Zoology	08
3	Biotechnology	08
4	Microbiology	02
5	Allied Medical Sciences	10
6	Business Administration	06
7	Commerce	02
8	Education	02
9	Environmental Science	01
10	Chemistry	08
11	Physics	06
12	Mathematics	08
13	Computer Science	08
14	Sociology	05
15	Rural Development	01
16	Social Work	01
17	English	03

== MoU & Collaboration ==
USTM has signed Memorandum of Understanding (MoU) with different Institutes & Universities:

- North-Eastern Space Applications Centre (NESAC), Department of Space, Govt. of India
- Universitas Ngurah Rai, Denpasar (UNR)
- Tezpur University
- National Institute of Technology, Silchar
- CSIR-NEIST
- CSIR-CRRI, New Delhi
- Bangladesh University of Health Sciences (BUHS)
- Aaranayak- A Scientific and Industrial Research Organisation
- Bamboo & Cane Development Institute (BCDI)
- National Law University and Judicial Academy, Assam
- Academy of excellence Kerala (Calicut)

== See also ==
- Education in India
- List of private universities in India
- List of universities and colleges by country
- Private University
- Assault of Gyandeep Hazarika
