= Assault of Gyandeep Hazarika =

2024 attack in Assam, India

On November 15, 2024, an incident of police brutality in Assam, involving Inspector Bhargav Borbora and a young delivery man, Gyandeep Hazarika, drew widespread public attention. The event, which occurred in the Fancy Bazaar area of Guwahati, Assam, involved the assault of Hazarika by Borbora, the Officer-in-Charge of the Panbazar Police Station.

== Incident Overview ==
Hazarika, a Zomato delivery worker, was allegedly stopped by Borbora for crossing a no-entry zone. The situation escalated when Borbora began physically assaulting Hazarika and also threatened to kill him. A bystander captured the incident on video, which showed Borbora striking the delivery man repeatedly, even as onlookers attempted to intervene. The officer's conduct, including verbal abuse and threats to the witnesses, was widely condemned.

== Public reaction ==
The viral video and reports of the assault sparked outrage across Assam and beyond. Citizens including Gyandeep Hazarika's mother condemns police misconduct, calls for professional behaviour and expressed anger over the police officer's actions, with many raising concerns about increasing police brutality and abuse of power. Social media platforms were flooded with calls for immediate action against the officer. There was a significant outpouring of support for Hazarika, with many condemning the officer's conduct and urging authorities to take swift action.

== Official response ==
In response to the public outcry, the Assam Police quickly moved to suspend Inspector Borbora and launch a formal inquiry into the incident. Assam’s Director General of Police, GP Singh, condemned the assault, describing it as "unacceptable." The Guwahati Police Commissioner, Diganta Barah, also ordered a thorough investigation to determine the extent of the officer’s misconduct.

Assam Chief Minister Himanta Biswa Sarma condemned the assault on Gyandeep Hazarika, a delivery worker, by Bhargav Borbora, the Officer-in-Charge of Panbazar Police Station. The incident, which occurred the previous day, prompted public outrage. Sarma expressed strong disapproval, emphasizing that police power should never be misused. He took to social media to address the issue, stating that the Assam Police must evolve into a force that serves the people with dignity and respect, rather than using excessive force against citizens. Sarma remarked, "Those days of unchecked power are long gone. Society will no longer tolerate the misuse of authority or violence against the very people the police are meant to safeguard. It is time for the police to embrace reform, accountability, and compassion—or step aside to make way for a force that truly upholds these values.

Debabrata Saikia, the Leader of the Opposition in Assam, has called for the immediate dismissal of Bhargav Borbora, Officer-in-Charge of Panbazar Police Station, following allegations of police brutality. This incident adds to a list of previous allegations against Borbora, including the assault of a journalist earlier in the year. In response, Saikia has urged the Assam Human Rights Commission and the Police Accountability Commission to take action, including filing a case under The Scheduled Caste and Scheduled Tribe (Prevention of Atrocities) Act, 1989. He has also called for reforms in Assam's police force, such as training officers on human rights, equipping them with body cameras, and ensuring transparency with live CCTV feeds from police stations. Saikia emphasized the need for greater accountability within the Assam Police, pointing to Borbora's repeated history of misconduct and the lack of consequences for his actions.

Raijor Dal leader Akhil Gogoi has demanded strict action against Bhargav Borbora, for assaulting and threatening Gyandeep Hazarika. Gogoi condemned the incident, calling it an example of the "abusive mentality" within certain sections of the police and labeled Borbora's actions as an attempted murder due to the death threats issued during the altercation. He emphasized that merely suspending Borbora was insufficient and demanded his immediate dismissal, urging authorities to hold him accountable through legal proceedings. Gogoi’s remarks have added momentum to the public demand for accountability and justice for the boy.

The officer Bhargav Borbora was suspended by the Director General of Police, G.P. Singh, the day following the incident and placed under "Ordinary Reserve." A departmental inquiry was subsequently announced against him. Inspector (UB) Manjit Terang was appointed as the new Officer-in-Charge in his place.

Human Rights Activist Injamul Haque has formally petitioned the Assam Human Rights Commission (AHRC), urging it to take immediate cognizance of a reported incident involving Inspector of Police Mr. Bhargav Borbora, who allegedly assaulted a delivery boy, Gyandeep Hazarika. In his petition, Haque stressed that in a welfare state, such incidents are unacceptable and risk transforming the system into a police state. He called for urgent intervention by the Commission and emphasized the need for comprehensive police reforms, including mandatory training on de-escalation techniques and the protection of human rights. Haque urged the AHRC to ensure accountability and take steps to uphold citizens' dignity and safety against any misuse of power.

== Aftermath ==
Gyandeep Hazarika, a student of Cotton University and delivery worker, became a symbol of vulnerability for workers who frequently interact with law enforcement. His ordeal highlighted the challenges faced by ordinary citizens when confronted by abusive officers, and his story sparked further conversations about police accountability in Assam. Students of Cotton University expressed their solidarity with Hazarika, staging protests against the brutality of the police officer and calling for justice.

Gyandeep Hazarika filed an FIR against Inspector Bhargav Borbora following the officer's suspension as the Officer-in-Charge of the Pan Bazaar Police Station. The FIR was filed after an assault incident involving Hazarika next day, which led to further complications in Borbora's life and career, thus worsening Borbora's position and condition.

Following the incident of police brutality involving Bhargav Borbora, Hazarika was recently offered a significant career opportunity by the Chancellor of the University of Science and Technology, Meghalaya, (USTM), Mr. Mahbubul Hoque. Mahbubul Hoque also took responsibility for supporting him in pursuing further studies in MBA. Despite the controversy surrounding Borbora's actions, he was appointed as a Sectional Officer at USTM, where he took on a role in the administrative department. This appointment came after widespread public backlash and the suspension of Borbora from his previous post as the Officer-in-Charge of Panbazar Police Station.

== See also ==
- List of cases of police brutality in India
