= Ibrahim Medical College =

Medical college in Dhaka, Bangladesh

- ইব্রাহিম মেডিকেল কলেজ
- Motto: Enter to learn, Proceed to serve
- Type: Private medical school
- Established: 2002
- Academic affiliations: University of Dhaka
- Principal: Nazma Haque
- Academic staff: 212
- Students: 600
- Undergraduates: 600
- Location: Shahbag, Dhaka, Bangladesh; 23.7385°N 90.3965°E
- Campus: Urban
- Language: English
- Website: imc.ac.bd

Ibrahim Medical College (IMC) is a private medical school in Bangladesh, established in 2002. It is located in the Shahbag neighborhood of Dhaka. It has another campus in Shegunbagicha. It is affiliated with University of Dhaka as a constituent college.

== History ==
The college is associated with Bangladesh Institute of Research and Rehabilitation for Diabetes, Endocrine and Metabolic Disorders (BIRDEM), which is the largest medical organization in the world for diabetes treatment, a 600-bed multidisciplinary teaching hospital founded by national professor Muhammad Ibrahim. The hospital was established in 1980 with the financial support of Bangladesh. At BIRDEM, 3,000 patients are treated in the outpatient department every day. No other hospital in Bangladesh or elsewhere treats so many diabetes patients. According to Denmark-based multinational pharmaceutical company Novo Nordics Vice President of the Pacific Ocean, Selvam Afsar Tuna, this is the world's largest hospital in treating diabetes. It has been designated as a WHO Collaborating Centre on Diabetes, Endocrine and Metabolic Disorders, as the only one of its kind in Asia.

== Academics ==
Ibrahim Medical College offers a five-year course of study leading to Bachelor of Medicine, Bachelor of Surgery (MBBS) & Bachelor of Dental Surgery (BDS).A one-year internship after graduation is compulsory for all graduates. They undertake their internship training at BIRDEM Hospital. The degree is recognized by Bangladesh Medical and Dental Council.

== Journal ==
IMC Journal of Medical Science, previously known as Ibrahim Medical College Journal is the official journal of Ibrahim Medical College. It is Index DOAJ, JournalTOCs, Google Scholar and MEDLINE listed.

== Recognition ==
Ibrahim Medical College has been accorded:

- Recognition by the Bangladesh Medical and Dental Council (BMDC).
- Listing in International Medical Education Directory (IMED), FAIMER, which will enable its graduates to appear at ECFMG and other entrance examinations abroad.

== See also ==
- List of medical colleges in Bangladesh
- List of dental schools in Bangladesh
- List of colleges in Bangladesh
