= Abdullah Abu Sayeed =

Bangladeshi educator

- আবদুল্লাহ্ আবু সায়ীদ
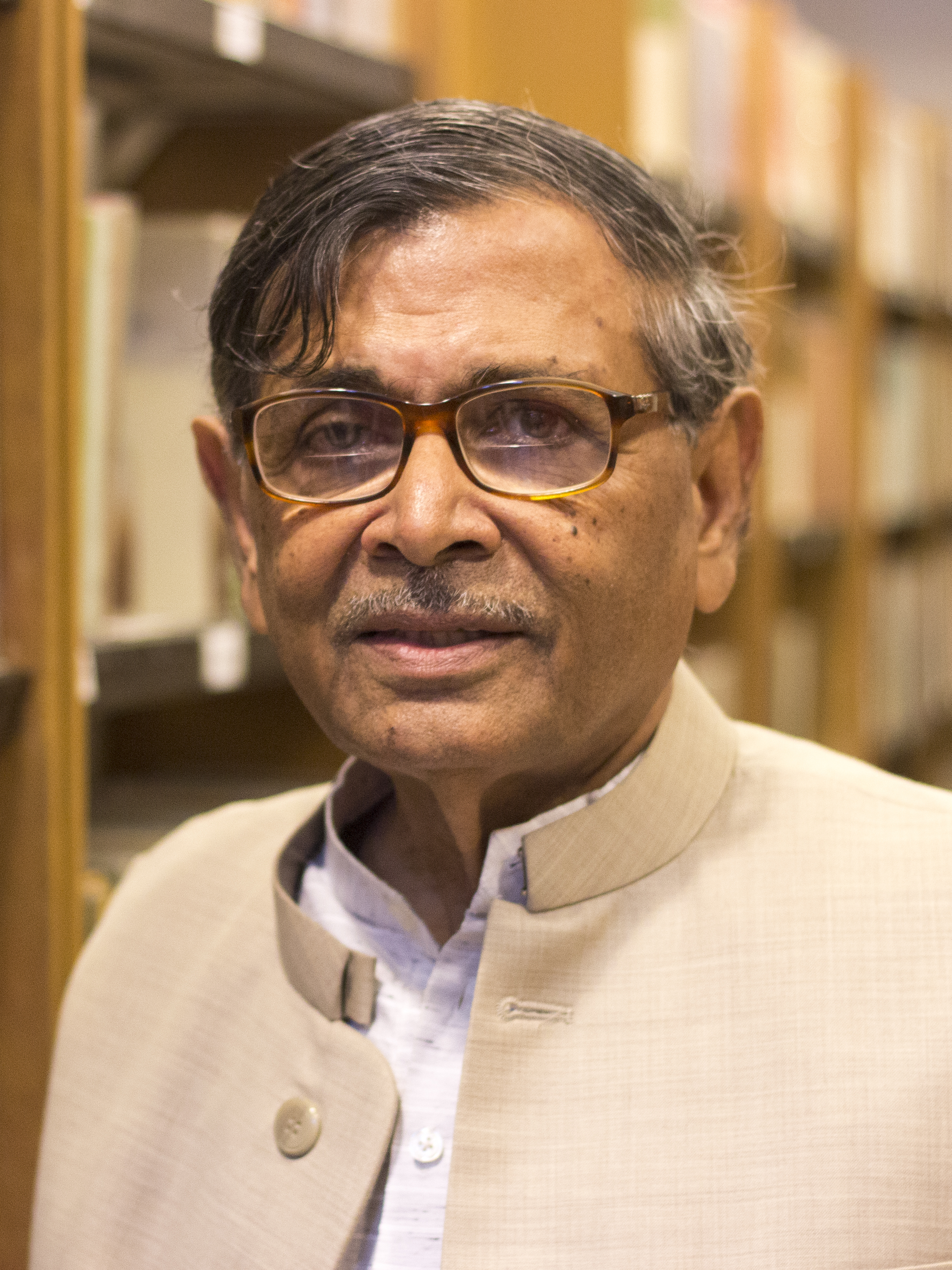
- Sayeed in 2014
- Born: 25 July 1939 (age 87); Park Circus, Calcutta, British India
- Education: University of Dhaka
- Occupations: Teacher, writer, television presenter, activist
- Writing career
- Notable awards: Ramon Magsaysay Award (2004); Bangla Academy Literary Award (2011); Ekushey Padak (2005)

Signature
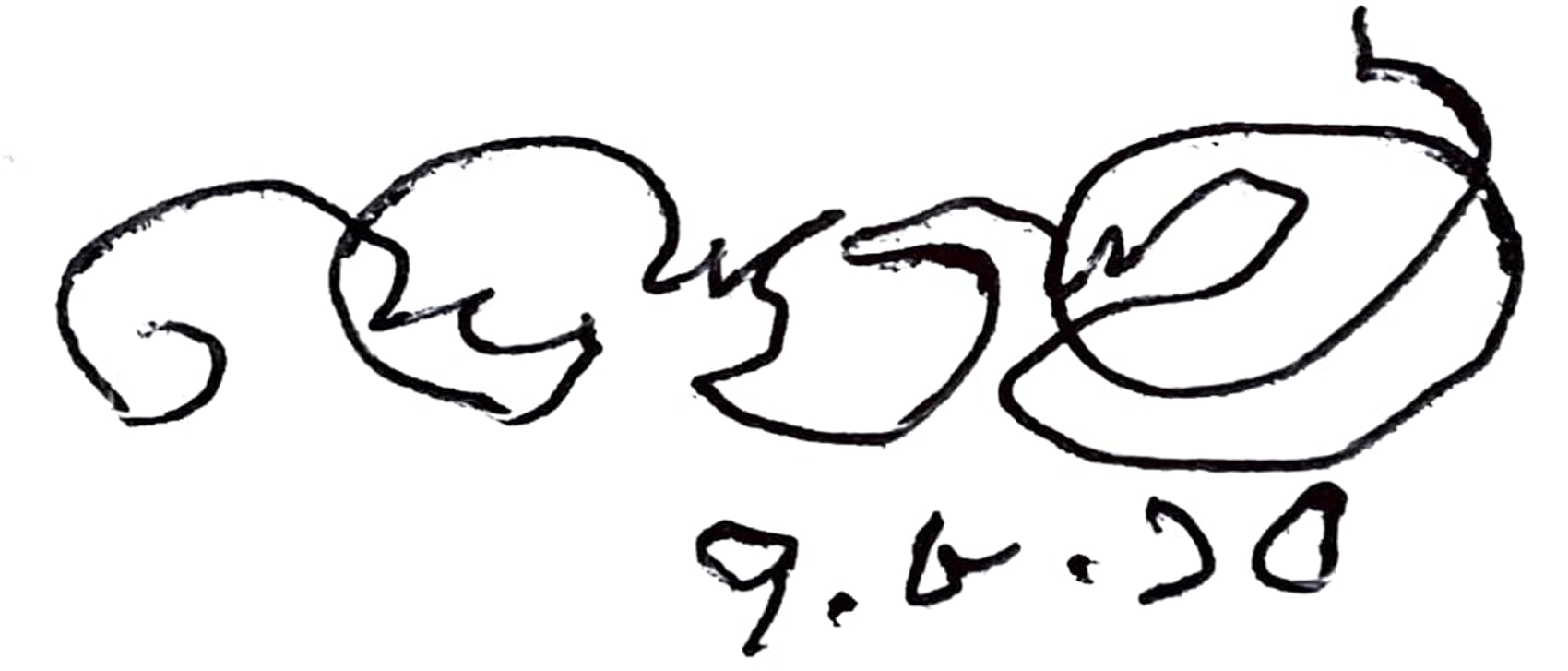

Abdullah Abu Sayeed (born 25 July 1939) is a Bangladeshi educator, writer, television presenter, and activist. He is the founder and chairman of Bishwo Shahitto Kendro, a non-profit organization that promotes the study of literature, reading habits, and progressive ideas.

== Early life ==
Sayeed was born on 25 July 1939 to a Bengali Muslim family in Park Circus, Calcutta. His father was Azimuddin Ahmed, a teacher of English and Bengali literature, and a playwright. Their ancestral home was in Kamargati, Bagerhat District. Sayeed passed the Secondary School Certificate (SSC) exam from Radhanagar Mojumder Academy (School & College), Pabna, in 1955 and the Higher Secondary Certificate (HSC) exam from Prafulla Chandra College in Bagerhat in 1957. He later earned BA and MA degrees in Bengali from the University of Dhaka in 1960 and 1961, respectively. While studying at the University of Dhaka, he organized, along with others, the birth centenary of the Nobel Laureate poet Rabindranath Tagore.

== Career ==
Sayeed started his career as a guest teacher at Government Haraganga College, Munshiganj. Then he taught at Sylhet Women college for some time. In 1962 he joined Rajshahi College as a full-time teacher. After 5 months, he joined Government Science College, Dhaka. He was also an acting principal for 2 years when he was only 23 years old. He also taught Bangla as a part-time lecturer at BUET. He took voluntary retirement as a professor in April 1992.

Sayeed gave an interview for the post of assistant professor. Being impressed by Sayeed's brilliance and personality, Dhaka College's renowned principal Jalaluddin Ahmed invited Sayeed to Dhaka College. Sayeed later became the department head of the Bengali language at Dhaka College. He was very popular among his students. It is said that even students from other colleges came to attend his classes. He wrote a book on his teaching career named Nishfola Mather Krishok (Farmer of an Infertile Land). He edited the literary magazine Kanthashar (The Voice) in the 1960s, which promoted a new trend in Bangladeshi literature.

Sayeed started participating in TV programs in 1966. At first, he was a presenter of children's programs and quiz programs. In the mid-1970s, he started presenting Shaptabarna (Seven Colors), a TV show on Bangladesh Television. Saptabarna was telecast once a week. It was a 90-minute-long program. In the 1970s and 1980s, he also presented the TV show Eid Anadamela. He received the National Television Award in 1977.

In 1978, he founded the Bishwa Sahitya Kendra. He has close association with Bangladesh Poribesh Andolan (BAPA) and Transparency International Bangladesh (TIB).

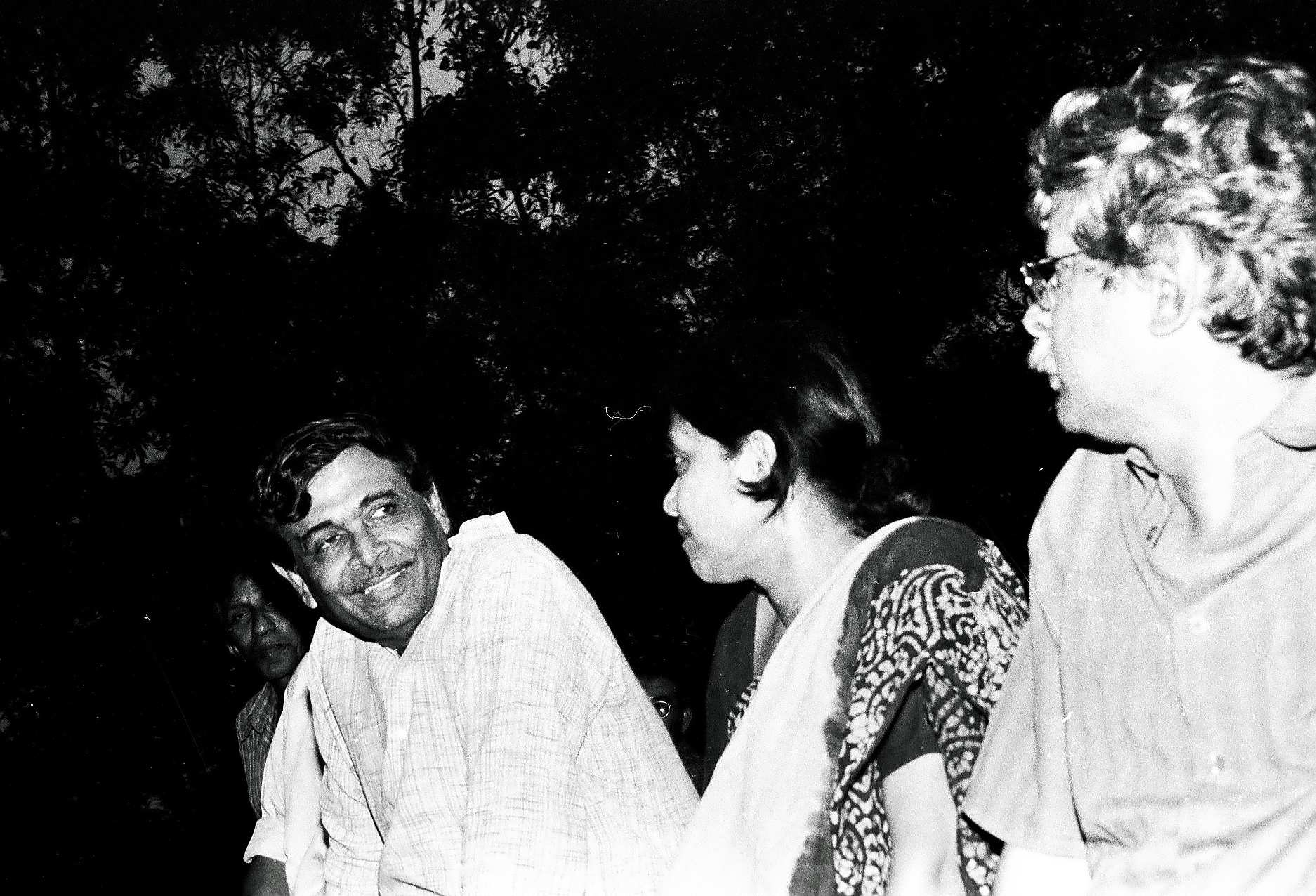
Abdullah Abu Sayeed (left), with Yasmeen Haque and Muhammed Zafar Iqbal

== Works ==
Sayeed has written and edited more than 50 books.

- Bidaye, Obonti (2005)
- Bohe Joloboti Dhara (2006)
- Bhalobashar Shampan (2007)
- Bishwo Shahitto Kendro O Ami (2007)
- Bisrosto Journal (2007)
- Amar Uposthapok Jibon (2008)
- Amar Ashabad (2009)
- Mrityumoy O Chiraharit
- Swapna-Duhswapner Galpo
- Rodanruposhi
- Juddhajatra
- Sangathan O Bangali
- Amar Ashabad
- Amar Boka Shoishob (2010)

== Awards ==
- Ramon Magsaysay Award (2004) in journalism, literature, and creative communication arts for "cultivating in the youth of Bangladesh a love for books and their humanizing values through exposure to the great works of Bengal and the world".
- National Television Award (1977)
- Mahbub Ullah Trust Award (1998)
- Ekushey Padak (2005)
- Bangla Academy Literary Award (2011) for his essays
- Khan Muhammad Farabi Memorial Award (2012)
- Star Lifetime Award on Education (2016)
- 1st Nahar Kamal Ahmad Achievement Award (2025)
