= Bangladesh Institute of Research and Training on Applied Nutrition =

Training and Research institute on applied nutrition in Bangladesh

Bangladesh Institute of Research and Training on Applied Nutrition (BIRTAN)
- Formation: 19 June 2012
- Headquarters: BIRTAN campus
- Location: Bishnandi, Araihazar, Narayanganj - 1450, Bangladesh
- Region served: Bangladesh
- Members: 191
- Official language: Bengali
- Executive Director: Md. Abdul Wadud
- Parent organization: BIRTAN
- Affiliations: 7 regional stations in Noakhali, Sunamganj, Rongpur, Sirajganj, Barishal, Jhinaidah, and Netrokona
- Website: www.birtan.gov.bd

The Bangladesh Institute of Research and Training on Applied Nutrition (Bengali: বাংলাদেশ ফলিত পুষ্টি গবেষণা ও প্রশিক্ষণ ইনস্টিটিউট) is a research and educational institute under the Ministry of Agriculture on applied nutrition. Md. Khorshed Alam is the present executive director of the institute.

== History ==
The Applied Nutrition Project was founded in 1968. It was renamed to Bangladesh Applied Nutrition and Human Resource Development Board in 2000. The board was further reorganized and rebranded to Bangladesh Institute of Research and Training on Applied Nutrition on 19 June 2012. On 1 July 2021, BIRTAN has been shifted to its own campus of 100 acres at Bishnandi, Araihazar, Narayanganj.

== Former directors ==
Name	Term start	Term end	Reference
Md. Khorshed Alam	Present		
Md. Abdul Wadud	4 July 2021	14 December 2023	
Md. Abdul Kader	21 January 2021	4 July 2021	
Md. Habibur Rahman Khan	1 July 2020	31 December 2020	
Zharna Begum	8 August 2019	25 June 2020	
Md. Abdur Rouf	30 May 2019	6 August 2019	
Ashraf Uddin Ahmed	1 January 2019	29 May 2019	
Mohammad Najmul Islam	19 September 2018	31 December 2018	
Md. Fazle Wahed Khondaker	8 May 2018	30 August 2018	
Md. Mosharaf Hossain	1 August 2011	7 May 2018	
Md. Noor Hossain Mia	6 June 2011	31 July 2011	
A. F. M. Saiful Islam	21 November 2007	5 June 2011	
Mirza Altaf Hossain	1 December 1992	7 November 2007	
Md. Mosharraf Hossain	30 April 1991	30 November 1992	
Abdur Rahim	1990	1991	
S. F. Rabbi	1988	1990	
S. M. Morshed Ali	1987	1988	
G. M. Shahjahan	1985	1987	
M. Kabir Ullah	1983	1985	
Abdur Rahim	1982	1983	
A. I. Md. Shamsul Alam	1980	1982	
Hajera Mahtab	1979	1980	
Khorshed Ali	1978	1979	
A. K. M. Nurul Islam	1976	1978	
M. A. Mutalib	1975	1976	
Omar Faruq	1974	1975	
Sister Rashita	1973	1974	
Md. Motalib	1971	1973	
H. Nizami	1970	1971	
Harinath Dey	1968	1970	
