= Gauri Dutt Sharma =

Management professor

- Citizenship: Indian
- Education: M.Sc. (Botany, 1973), and Ph.D. (Ecology of Mycorrhiza, 1981)
- Occupations: Academic, Professor
- Title: Vice-chancellor, University of Science and Technology, Meghalaya.

Gauri Dutt Sharma is an Indian academic, professor in life sciences, currently serving as the Vice Chancellor of the University of Science and Technology, Meghalaya.

Previously, he served as the Founder Vice Chancellor of the Bilaspur State University, Chhattisgarh, founder Vice Chancellor of Atal Bihari Vajpayee Vishwavidyalaya, former Vice Chancellor of Nagaland University and former Pro Vice Chancellor of Assam University.

== Life and career ==
He was born on 1 October 1950. He completed his M.Sc. (Botany) in 1973, and Ph.D.in 1981. He pursued a post-doctorate at Sheffield University, United Kingdom in 1991.

He is a Life Member of the National Academy of Sciences, India, and the Indian Botanical Society (FBS).

He is also elected as the President of National Academy of Social Science (NASS), Allahabad, immediate past president of Association of Indian Universities, New Delhi,

He has published over 340 research papers in national and international journals. He guided 62 research scholars for their Ph.D. degrees, 5 M.Phil. and 5 Post Doctoral Fellows. He has also authored and edited 13 books published by Indian and foreign publishers. Some of the books he has edited, and contributed to include the following:

- Abd El-Latif Hesham; Ram Sanmukh Upadhyay; Gauri Dutt Sharma; Chakravarthula Manoharachary; Vijai Kumar Gupta, eds. (2020). Fungal Biotechnology and Bioengineering. Fungal Biology. doi:10.1007/978-3-030-41870-0. ISBN 978-3-030-41869-4.
- Gupta, V. K.; Sharma, G. D.; Tuohy, M. G.; Gaur, R., eds. (2016). The Handbook of Microbial Bioresources. doi:10.1079/9781780645216.0000. ISBN 978-1-78064-521-6.
