= AK Azad Khan =

Physician, honored with Independence day award and National Professor

- এ কে আজাদ খান
- Known for: Social Worker, physician, professor
- Awards: Independence Award (2018)

AK Azad Khan is a physician and a social worker from Bangladesh. In 2018, he was awarded the Independence Award for his contributions in social-welfare. He was appointed National Professor by the government of Bangladesh in 2021. On 1958, AK Azad Khan passed with highest marks in matriculation from Saint Alfred's High School in Padrishibpur. Later in 1960, he passed intermediate from Dhaka College and complete his medical degrees from Dhaka Medical College. AK Azad Khan's wife is the physician professor Kishowar Azad. Khan's father-in-law is the national professor and founder of BIRDEM, Muhammad Ibrahim. Khan has two sons Farook Azam Khan and Faiz Asif Khan.

== Books ==
- Bangladesh Diabetic Samity Path Parikrama
- Sarak Pathe Oxford theke Dhaka

== Awards and honours ==
- Independence Award (2018)
- Bangla Academy Fellowship (2020)
- National Professor (2021)
