= Bangladesh University of Health Sciences =

Private university of Bangladesh

- বাংলাদেশ ইউনিভার্সিটি অব হেলথ সায়েন্সেস
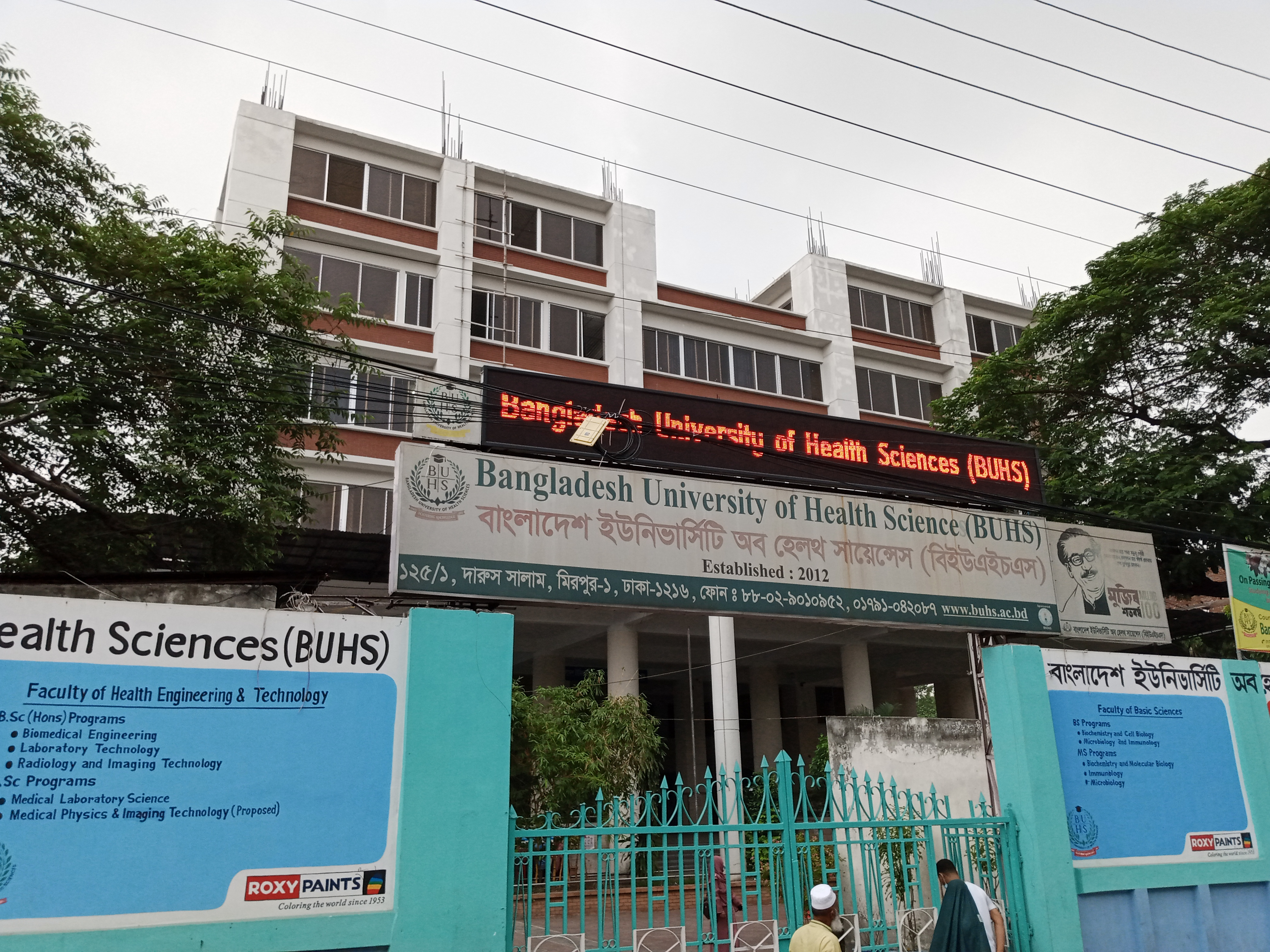
- Motto: Discipline is life
- Type: Private
- Established: 6 December 2012
- Affiliations: MOE; UGC; BIRDEM; AUAP; IAUP; IAU; DAB; BSMMU; DU; WDF; Rockefeller Foundation
- Chancellor: President Mohammed Shahabuddin
- Vice-Chancellor: Faridul Alam
- Chairman, Board of Trustees: A K Azad Khan
- Location: Mirpur Thana, Dhaka, Bangladesh; 23.7832°N 90.3532°E
- Campus: Urban
- Website: buhs.ac.bd

Bangladesh University of Health Sciences is a private university in Dhaka, Bangladesh. It is the first health sciences university in Bangladesh and was established by Diabetic Association of Bangladesh in 2012. Faridul Alam is the vice-chancellor of the university.

== History ==
The Diabetic Association of Bangladesh wanted to create a medical institute based on the requirements of its hospital, BIRDEM in the mid-1990s. They named the proposed institute Bangladesh Institute of Health Sciences. The government of Bangladesh donated 6 acres in Darus Salam, Mirpur, Dhaka for the proposed institute. The proposed university also received finance from the Health Care Development Project of Diabetic Association of Bangladesh and supported by monetary grants from the Dutch government. The association also received loans from a consortium of 12 banks.

In 2007, the Bangladesh Institute of Health Sciences starting offering courses in public health under the University of Dhaka. It received further grants from the Rockefeller Foundation, University of Oslo, and World Diabetes Foundation based in Netherlands. The institute applied to the University Grants Commission to become a higher education degree providing university named Bangladesh University of Health Sciences. On 6 December 2012, the university received permission from the University Grant Commission to start functioning as a university.
