= Mahtabuddin Sarker =

Bengali politician

Mahtabuddin Sarker Fuka Dipti
- মাহাতাব উদ্দিন সরকার

Member of the National Assembly of Pakistan
- In office 1965–1969
- Preceded by: Erfan Reza Choudhury
- Succeeded by: Constituency abolished
- Constituency: Rajshahi-II

Personal details
- Born: 1903 Nawabganj, Malda district, Bengal Presidency
- Died: 1973 (aged 69–70)
- Party: Muslim League
- Children: Fashiuddin Mahtab

Mahtabuddin Sarker (Bengali: মাহাতাব উদ্দিন সরকার; 1903–1973), also known as Fuka Dipti (Bengali: ফুকা ডিপটি), was a Bangladeshi politician and magistrate. He was a member of the 4th National Assembly of Pakistan.

== Early life ==
Mahtabuddin Sarker Fuka was born in 1903 to a Bengali Muslim family of Sarkers in the village of Rajarampur in Nawabganj, Malda district, Bengal Presidency. He was the son of Ismail Sarker and Hasina Khatun.

== Career ==
Sarker served as a deputy magistrate in various parts of the Bengal Presidency such as Murshidabad, Nadia and Pabna. He also administered the Department of Land and Revenue under the British Bengal government and eventually became the Education Secretary of Bengal. Sarker later retired and entered politics. He served as a union chairman and as the chairman of Narayanganj municipality. Sarker was elected to the Rajshahi-II constituency as a member of the 4th National Assembly of Pakistan following the 1965 elections under the Basic Democracy system.

He founded the Hasina Girls High School in Rajarampur and contributed to the establishment of Chapai Nawabganj Mango Research Centre and mango pickle and juice factory.

== Personal life ==
Sarker had four sons and four daughters. His eldest son, Dr. Fasihuddin Mahtab, was a member of President Ziaur Rahman's advisory council and former technocrat minister.

== Death ==
Sarker died in Bangladesh on 1973. He was posthumously awarded the Chapai Nawabganj Municipality Centenary Celebration Award in 2003.
