= Khulna Government Public Library =

Coordinates: 22.8387°N 89.5392°E

Khulna Government Public Library is a public library in Khulna, Bangladesh.

Established in 1897, the library contain over 30,000 volumes.

== Directors ==
- Mohd. Ahsan Ullah

== Events ==
- Day essay competition
- Competition in the beautiful writing
