= Bishwo Shahitto Kendro =

Bangladeshi Organization

- বিশ্ব সাহিত্য কেন্দ্র
- Seal of Bishwo Shahitto Kendro
- Abbreviation: BSK
- Formation: 1978; 48 years ago
- Type: Registered public welfare trust
- Location: 14 Kazi Nazrul Islam Avenue, Dhaka
- Official language: Bengali
- Key people: Abdullah Abu Sayeed
- Website: bskbd.org

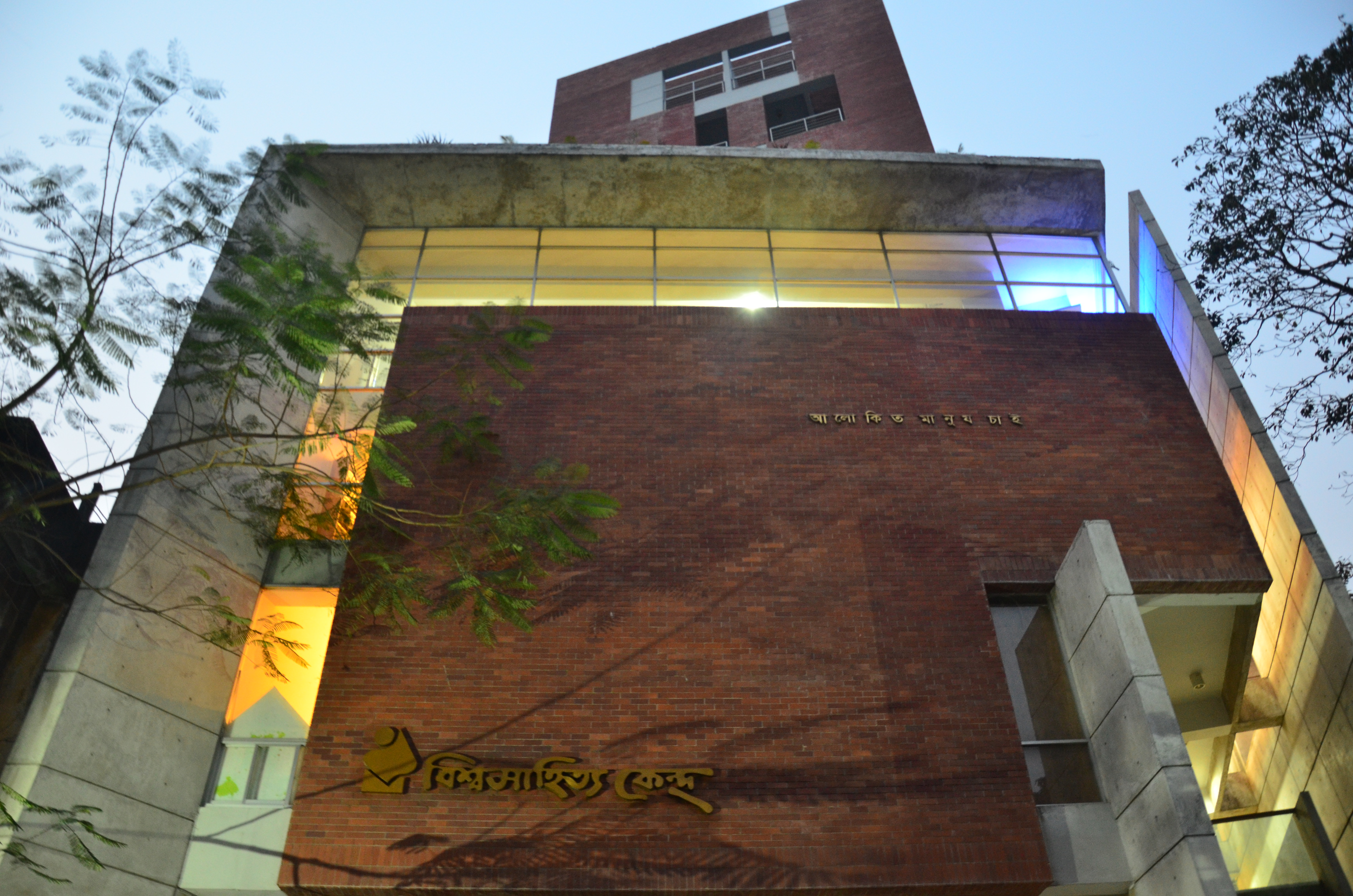
Entrance of Bishwo Shahitto Kendro building in Dhaka

Bishwo Shahitto Kendro (BSK) (Bengali: বিশ্ব সাহিত্য কেন্দ্র, meaning 'World-Literature Centre'), is a non-profit institution in Bangladesh that promotes reading habits, enlightenment and progressive ideas among students and general public. Popularly known as just Bhrammaman library (mobile library), this institution was established by famous writer, television presenter, organiser, and activist Abdullah Abu Sayeed. Sayeed is the recipient of the 97th Ramon Magsaysay Award in Journalism, Literature, and Creative Communication Arts for "... cultivating in the youth of Bangladesh a love for literature and its humanizing values through exposure to the great books of Bengal and the world" – which was a recognition of the contribution of the library.

== Activity ==
Bishwo Shahitto Kendro offers classes on world literature for Higher Secondary students, and also provides every book for those classes. For Secondary and Junior school level it operates a nationwide reading program, and provides books for the students. In 2007, it had 500 schools under this program, and over 100000 active student members.

Besides these programs, Bishwo Shahitto Kendro actively maintains libraries across the nation. It pioneered the concept of mobile library in Bangladesh, which carries books around the country. Since books are expensive and libraries are not available at all – these mobile libraries are getting very popular. Bishwo Shahitto Kendro also arranges reader's forum and discussions, which are open to everyone who is interested. These events are open to new thoughts and encourages thoughtful logical discussions. Through these endeavours Bishwo Shahitto Kendro is continuing its works with a motto that says – "We want enlightened humans".

Bishwo Shahitto Kendro activities are mostly based in Bangladesh. It also has an office in New York.

== Awards ==
- 2008 UNESCO Jan Amos Comenius Medal.
