= Diabetic Association of Bangladesh =

Medical organization in Bangladesh

- Formation: 1956
- Founder: Muhammad Ibrahim
- Headquarters: Dhaka, Bangladesh
- Region served: Bangladesh
- Official language: Bengali
- Website: Diabetic Association of Bangladesh

Diabetic Association of Bangladesh is a non-profit organization medical organization and is located in Dhaka, Bangladesh. Professor AK Azad Khan is the present president of the association.

== History ==
The organization was established in 1956 in East Pakistan by Muhammad Ibrahim, National professor of Bangladesh. The organization started in Segun Bagicha as an outpatient clinic. In 1980 it established BIRDEM, a specialized research hospital on diabetics. The organization is a regional collaborating centre of the World Health Organization. It has presence with over 80 local centres. It raises awareness about diabetics and provides medical advice and screening.
