= Muhammad Ibrahim =

Bangladeshi physician (1911–1989)

Mohammad Ibrahim
- মোহাম্মদ ইব্রাহিম
- Born: 31 December 1911 village of Kharera in Bharatpur, Murshidabad, Bengal Presidency, British India (Present day in West Bengal)
- Died: September 6, 1989 (aged 77)
- Resting place: Banani graveyard
- Education: Calcutta Medical College
- Occupation: Physician
- Spouse: Sakina Ibrahim
- Awards: Full list

Muhammad Ibrahim (Bengali: মোহাম্মদ ইব্রাহিম; 31 December 1911 – 6 September 1989) was a Bangladeshi physician. He established Bangladesh Institute of Research and Rehabilitation in Diabetes, Endocrine and Metabolic Disorders (BIRDEM), the diabetes health-care and research institute complex in 1980. The Government of Bangladesh awarded him National Professor and the Independence Day Award in 1978.

== Education ==
Ibrahim earned MBBS degree from Calcutta Medical College in 1938. He became MRCP in 1949. He was made a Fellow of College of Chest Physicians (FCCP) in 1950.

== Career ==
Ibrahim established Diabetic Association of Pakistan (later Diabetic Association of Bangladesh) on 28 February 1956. He also founded Diabetic Association in Karachi and Lahore, West Pakistan, in 1964.

Ibrahim established the diabetes health-care and research institute complex, BIRDEM at Dhaka in 1980 where the out-patients centre of the Bangladesh Diabetic Association was shifted to. The institute is housed in two buildings, named the Ibrahim Memorial Diabetes Centre after his death in 1989. In recognition of its innovative, extensive and high quality service it was designated in 1982 as a "WHO-Collaborating Centre for Developing Community-oriented Programs for Prevention and Control of Diabetes." It is the first such centre in Asia. He established the Bangladesh Institute of Research and Training for Applied Nutrition (BIRTAN) and Rehabilitation and Vocational Training Centre (RVTC) in Dhaka to develop low-cost nutrition, and to give vocational training to poor and unemployed diabetics.

Ibrahim served as an adviser to the president, with the rank of minister in-charge of the Ministry of Health and Population Control, in the mid-1970s.

Ibrahim took part in drafting the government's first population control policy and setting up National Population Council.

Ibrahim was a founder fellow at the Islamic World Academy of Sciences, Amman, Jordan in 1986.

== Awards ==
- Independence Day Award (1979)
- Gold Medal by Begum Zebunnesa and Kazi Mahbubullah Trust (1981)
- Gold Medal by Mahbub Ali Khan Memorial Trust (1985)
- Gold Medal by Comilla Foundation, Comilla (1986)
- Gold Medal by Khan Bahadur Ahsanullah Memorial Trust (1989)
- Gold Medal by Islamic Foundation Bangladesh (1989)

== Personal life and legacy ==
Ibrahim's death anniversary is observed as the Diabetic Service Day to endorse and honor his contribution to socio-medicare services.
