= BIRDEM =

Hospital in Dhaka, Bangladesh

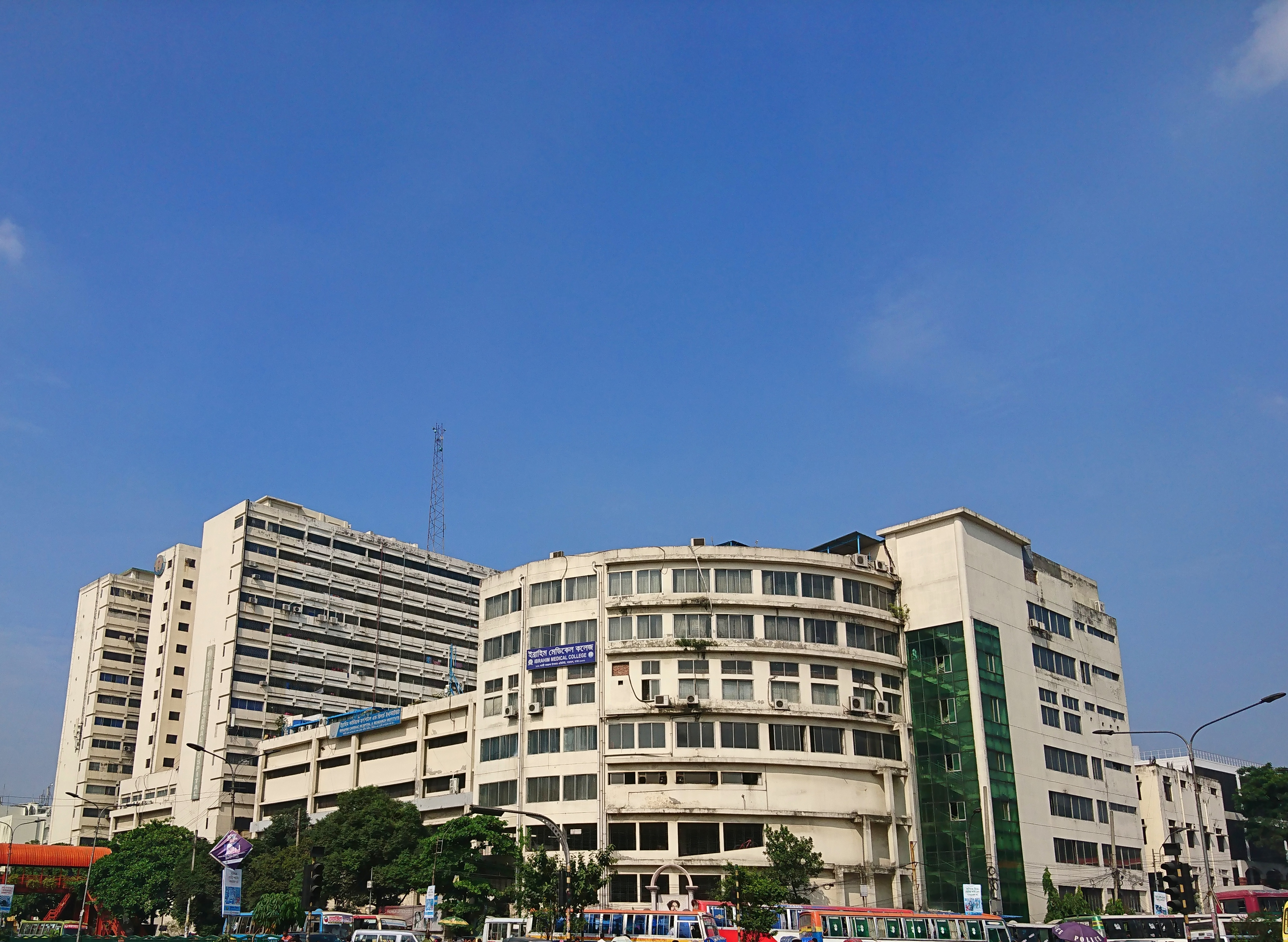
- BIRDEM Bangladesh

Geography
- Location: Shahbag, Dhaka, Bangladesh
- Coordinates: 23°44.3′N 90°23.78′E

Organisation
- Patron: Muhammad Ibrahim

Helipads
Number	Length		Surface
Number	ft	m	Surface
			for BIRDEM Segunbagicha: MRT Line 6 Shahbagh

History
- Opened: 1980

Links
- Website: birdembd.org
- Lists: Hospitals in Bangladesh

Bangladesh Institute of Research and Rehabilitation in Diabetes, Endocrine and Metabolic Disorders, commonly known as BIRDEM, is a 650-bed multidisciplinary hospital complex of the Diabetic Association of Bangladesh. It is located at Shahbag, Dhaka, Bangladesh. It was established in 1980 with the financial support of Bangladesh government. In BIRDEM, 3,000 patients are treated in the out patients department (OPD) every day.

== History ==
The Diabetic Association for Pakistan (later Bangladesh Diabetic Association) was formed under the leadership of national professor Muhammad Ibrahim in February 1956. He offered a ground floor room of his home in Segunbagicha, Dhaka, to be used by the association, and there he began outpatient services for diabetes. While Bangladesh was still part of Pakistan, the government granted the association land in Segunbagicha for a hospital. BIRDEM hospital was inaugurated in 1980 at Shahbagh. In 2013, BIRDEM-2 hospital was started in Segunbagicha.

BIRDEM's inpatient departments work much like those of a general hospital, though diabetic and other endocrine patients are always given priority. The hospital unit was renamed BIRDEM General Hospital to change the public impression that it offers only diabetes care. BIRDEM also keeps a separate research department with full-time staff, and its research is carried out with various national and international organisations. According to Ibrahim Medical College (IMC), the hospital occupies two buildings, one of 15 storeys and one of 13. It reports over 4,168 outpatient attendances a day and 750 inpatient beds, of which 30% are free. BIRDEM General Hospital for Mothers and Children is a separate unit.
