= Mohishtoli =

- Village
- Location in Bangladesh
- Coordinates: 23°14′N 89°57′E
- Country: Bangladesh
- Division: Dhaka Division
- District: Gopalganj District
- Upazila: Muksudpur Upazila

Area
  - Total: 2.5 km^{2} (0.97 sq mi)

Population
  - Total: 2,000
  - Density: 800/km^{2} (2,100/sq mi)
- Time zone: UTC+6 (Bangladesh Time)

Mohishtoli is a village in Gopalganj District, Bangladesh, part of Muksudpur Upazila. The village covers an area of 2.5 km^{2}, and is bordered by the villages of Nanikhir, Barovatra, Goalgram, Kasalia.

Mohishtoli under Nanikhir Union parishad was established in 1856. The village consists of three wards and a few mahallas. The village has a primary school, four temples, and a few community schools.

Non-governmental organizations operating in Mohishtoli include BDAO (the Bangladesh Development Acceleration Organisation), BRAC, CCDB, ASA, World Vision, and HCCB.
