= Baman Barara =

- Village
- Interactive map of Baman Barara
- Coordinates: 23.2750°N 89.8968°E
- Country: Bangladesh
- Division: Dhaka Division
- District: Gopalganj District
- Upazila: Muksudpur Upazila
- Time zone: UTC+6 (Bangladesh Time)

Baman Barara is a village in Gopalganj District, Bangladesh, part of Muksudpur Upazila and Bhabrasur Union.

Non-governmental organizations operating in Baman Barara include BDAO (the Bangladesh Development Acceleration Organisation), BRAC, CCDB, ASA, World Vision, and HCCB.

== Agriculture ==
The main crops grown in Baman Barara are paddy, wheat, jute, sugarcane, onion, garlic, betel leaf, vegetables and sweet potato. Formerly, the village grew Linseed, sesame, indigo, china, kaun, but these are rarely grown anymore.

Baman Barara also produces the fruits mango, jackfruit, papaya, palm, guava, lemon, litchi, coconut, guava, and banana.

There are fisheries, hatcheries, poultry and dairy farms in Baman Barara. Some fishermen depend on the waters of the local pond, bills and river for their livelihood.
