= Boalia, Gopalgonj =

Coordinates: 23.7502°N 89.4794°E

Boalia
- Village
- Interactive map of Boalia
- Country: Bangladesh
- Division: Dhaka Division
- District: Rajbari District (Bangladesh)
- Upazila: Kalukhali Upazila
- Time zone: UTC+6 (Bangladesh Time)

Boalia is a village in Rajbari District, Bangladesh, part of Kalukhali Upazila and Modapur Union.

Non-governmental organizations operating in Boalia include Bangladesh Development Acceleration Organisation (BDAO) (the Bangladesh Development Acceleration Organisation), BRAC, CCDB, ASA, World Vision, and HCCB.

== Agriculture ==
The main crops grown in Boalia are paddy, wheat, jute, sugarcane, onion, garlic, betel leaf, vegetables and sweet potato. Formerly, the village grew Linseed, sesame, indigo, china, kaun, but these are rarely grown anymore.

Boalia also produces the fruits including Mango, jackfruit, papaya, palm, guava, lemon, litchi, coconut, guava, and banana.

There are fisheries, hatcheries, poultry and dairy farms in Boalia. Some fishermen depend on the waters of the local pond, bills and river for their livelihood.
