= Satya Dharma =

South Asian monotheistic religion

Satya Dharma is a humanistic and monotheistic religion of Bangladesh and West Bengal, India, which developed from Liberal Hinduism.

It is influenced by Islam, Christianity, Humanism, Brahmo Samaj, Buddhism, Baul, Secularism, the Bhakti movement and Bengali culture. It was founded by Mohatma Gurunath Sengupta who was a great spiritual personality and a famous Bengali Sanskrit scholar and philosopher. He wrote many books about religion, humanity, philosophy, and ethics.

There are 500,000 to 800,000 followers of this religion, scattered throughout West Bengal and Bangladesh. The shrine of Mohatma Gurunath Sengupta at Goalgram, Muksudpur, Gopalganj in Bangladesh is considered as one of the holy places by the followers. Some followers are in Maharashtra, India.

Jyotirao Phule sought a new egalitarian order in his Sarvajanik Satya Dharma.
