= Nanikhir =

- Village
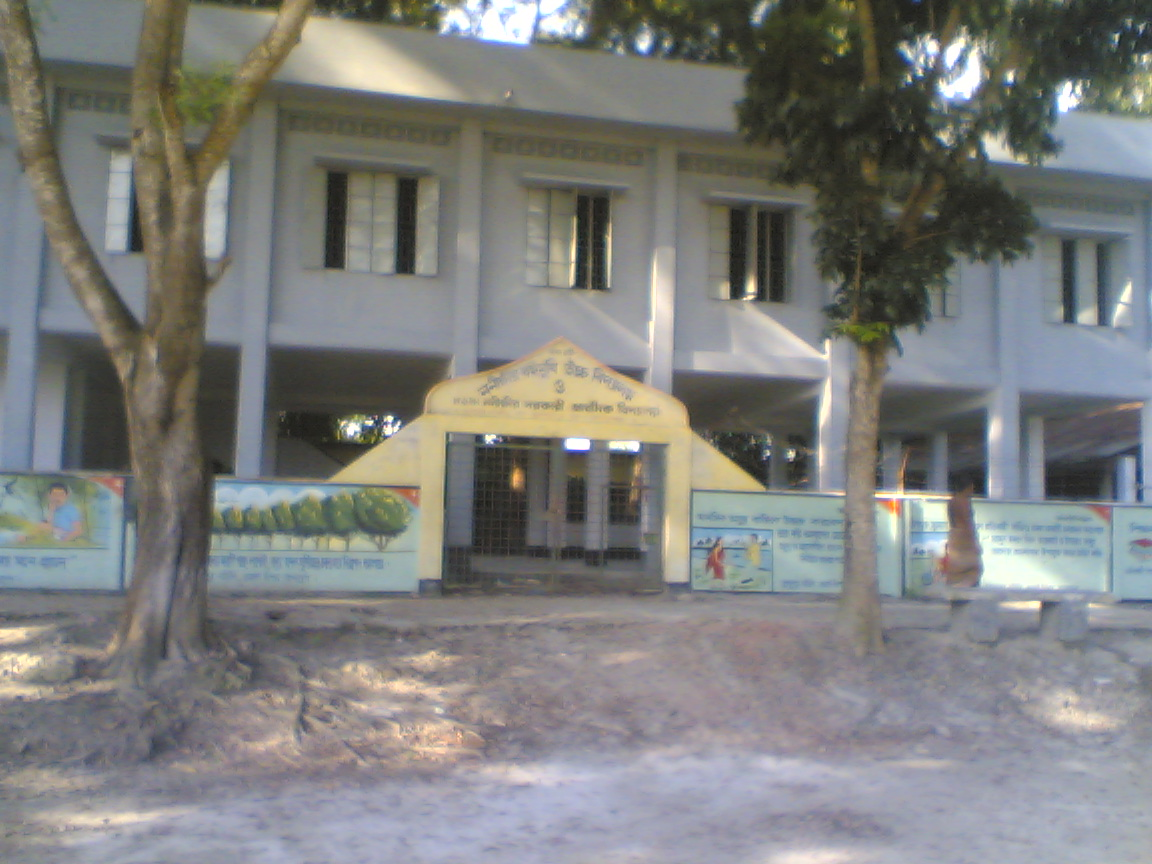
- Nanikhir High School

- Location in Bangladesh
- Coordinates: 23°14′N 89°57′E
- Country: Bangladesh
- Division: Dhaka Division
- District: Gopalganj District
- Upazilas of Bangladesh: Muksudpur Upazila
  - Urban density: 840/km^{2} (2,200/sq mi)
- Time zone: UTC+6 (Bangladesh Time)

Nanikhir is a village in Gopalganj District, Bangladesh, part of Muksudpur Upazila. It is part of the Nanikhir union, which consists of the villages of Nanikhir, Baro Vatra, Mohishtoli, Pathorghata, Goalgram, Bongram and Kazipara, and which is bordered by the unions of Jalirpar, Kasalia, Mosna and Gohala. locally known Nanikhir Khall flows through the village to the Bil Rout canal at Jalirpar, and then the Padma River.

== History ==
The village was established in 1634. In May 1971, during the Bangladesh Liberation War, the village was attacked by several aircraft of the Pakistani Air Force, supported by a number of Razakars Etc.). Several of the inhabitants were killed and a motor launch was damaged. On 9 August 1971 about 200 members of the Bangladesh Liberation Army, in collaboration with local people, liberated Muksudpur. On 12 October 1971, local guerillas clashed with forces of the Pakistani army, in which 22 Razakars and Pakistani soldiers were killed. In a later encounter, near Diknagar Bridge 30 Pakistani soldiers and three Liberation Army members were killed. A number of former members of the Liberation Army continue to live in Nanikhir.

== Demographics ==
Nanikhir consists of three wards and seven mahallas. The village has a population of 5000; with 56.42% being male and 47.58% female. The population density is 840 per km^{2}. The literacy rate is 91.72%. The village has nine mosques and two temples.

== Education and recreation ==
Overall literacy in the village is 91.72%; 51.95% of those literate are males, while females make up 39.77%. The village has a state high school, Nanikhir High School, three state primary schools, one Alia Madrasa, five community schools and twelve satellite schools.

The village is home to the Shahed Zinnah Smrity Jubo Shango & Cultural organization. There are three cultural clubs, three rural public libraries, three local theatre groups and a number of women's organisations.

== Economy ==
The main occupation in the village is agriculture (43.09%), with 23.45% employed as agricultural labourers 23.45%. Other occupations are as general waged labourer (2.21%), commerce (10.10%), service (7.69%), fishing (1.71%), industry (1.11%), hawking (2.32%), construction (1.39%), with another 6.93% engaged in 'other' activities.

The main crops grown in the village are rice, wheat, jute, sugarcane, onions, garlic, betel leaf, vegetables and sweet potatoes. Linseed, sesame, indigo, china and kaun used to be grown, but have largely died out. Fruit is also grown, including mangoes, jackfruit, papayas, palms, lemons, lychee, coconuts, guava and bananas. There are also a number of poultries, fisheries, dairies and hatcheries.

The village is connected by road to Dhaka via Muksudpur Upazila, though few roads pass through the village. There are some peat and coal deposits, and a number of fairs and bazaars take place in the village. The main exports are jute, onions, wheat, rice and potatoes.

== Non-governmental organizations ==
A number of non-governmental organizations (NGOs) are active in the area, including the Bangladesh Development Acceleration Organisation (BDAO), BRAC, Proshika, Grameen Bank, Caritas, CCDB, ASA, World Vision and HCCB.

== Medical ==
The village is home to the Nanikhir Union health complex, four family planning centres, three satellite clinics and the Nanikhir Government Hospital.

== Heritage ==
The Nanikhir Nava-Ratna Temple, an example of terracotta art in Bangladesh, was built during the period of Mughal rule.

== Gallery ==
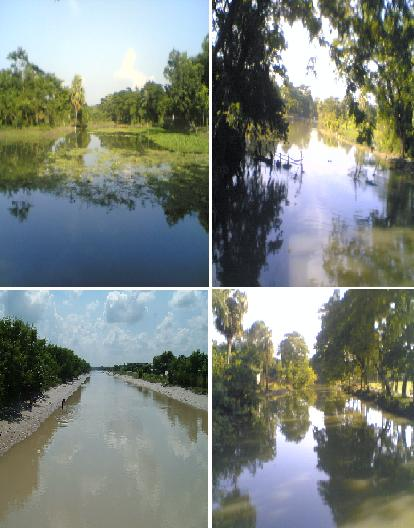
Hatashe Channel in Barovatra, Nanikhir, Nawkhanda and Pathorghata

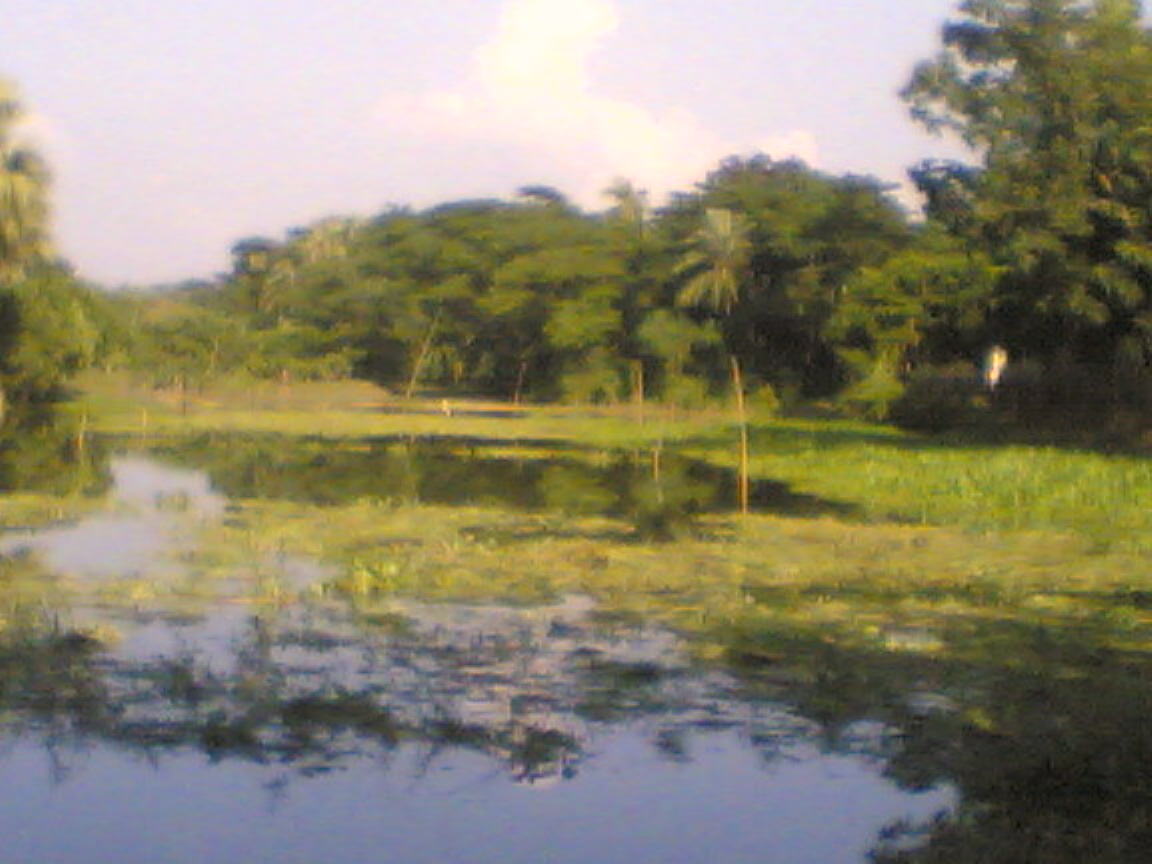
Hatashe Channel
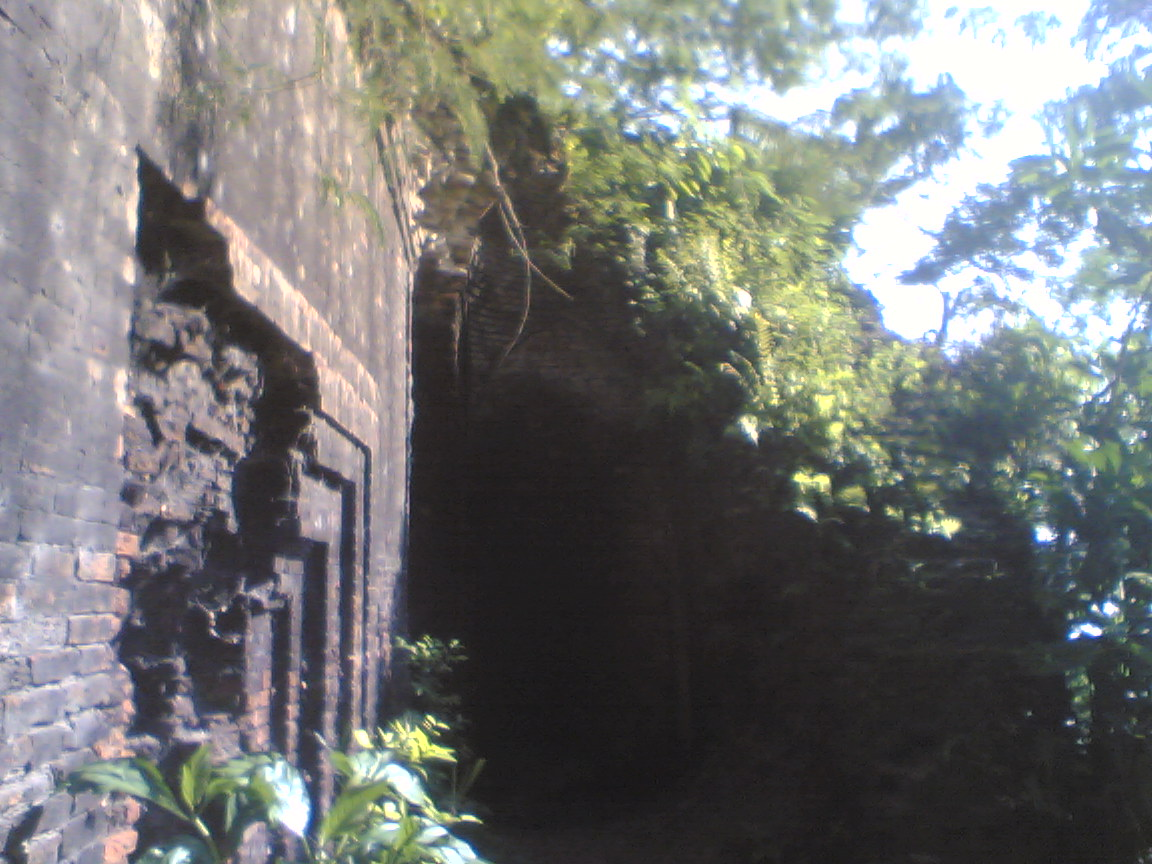
Nanikhir Nava-Ratna Temple

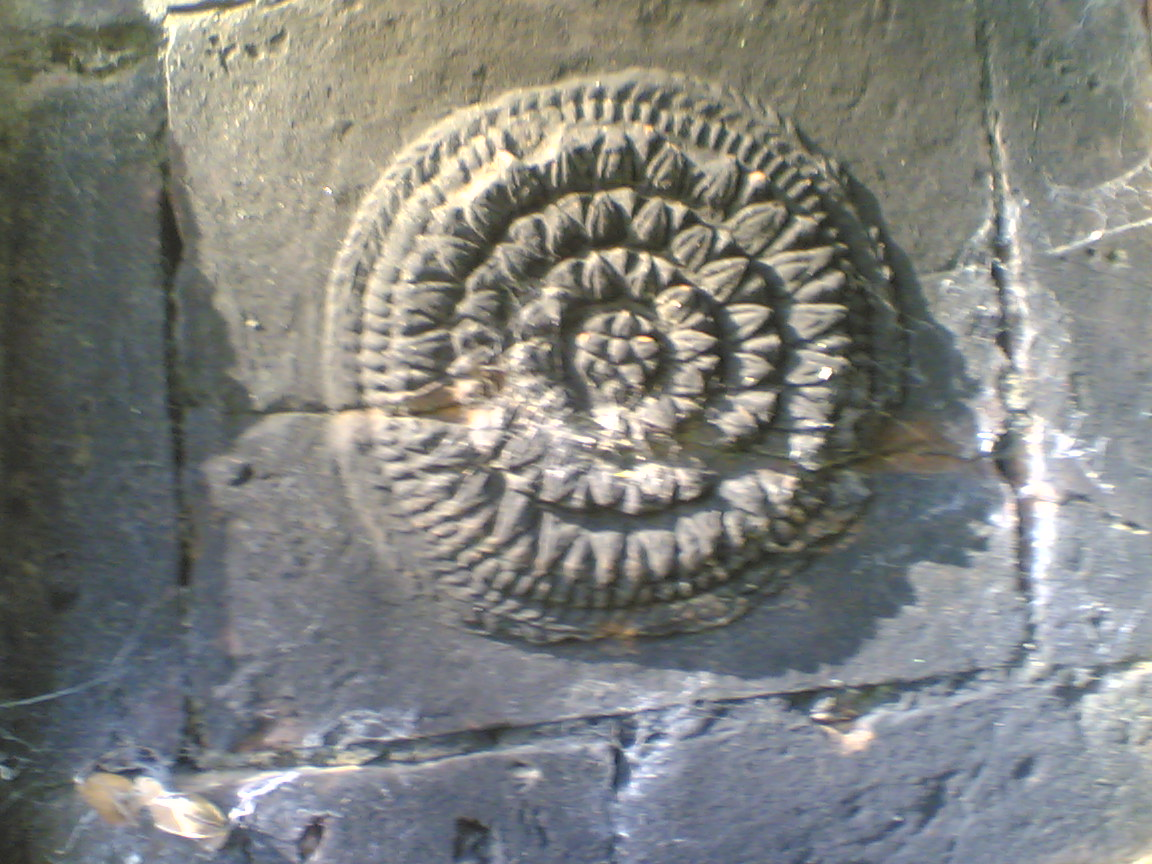
Terracotta art.

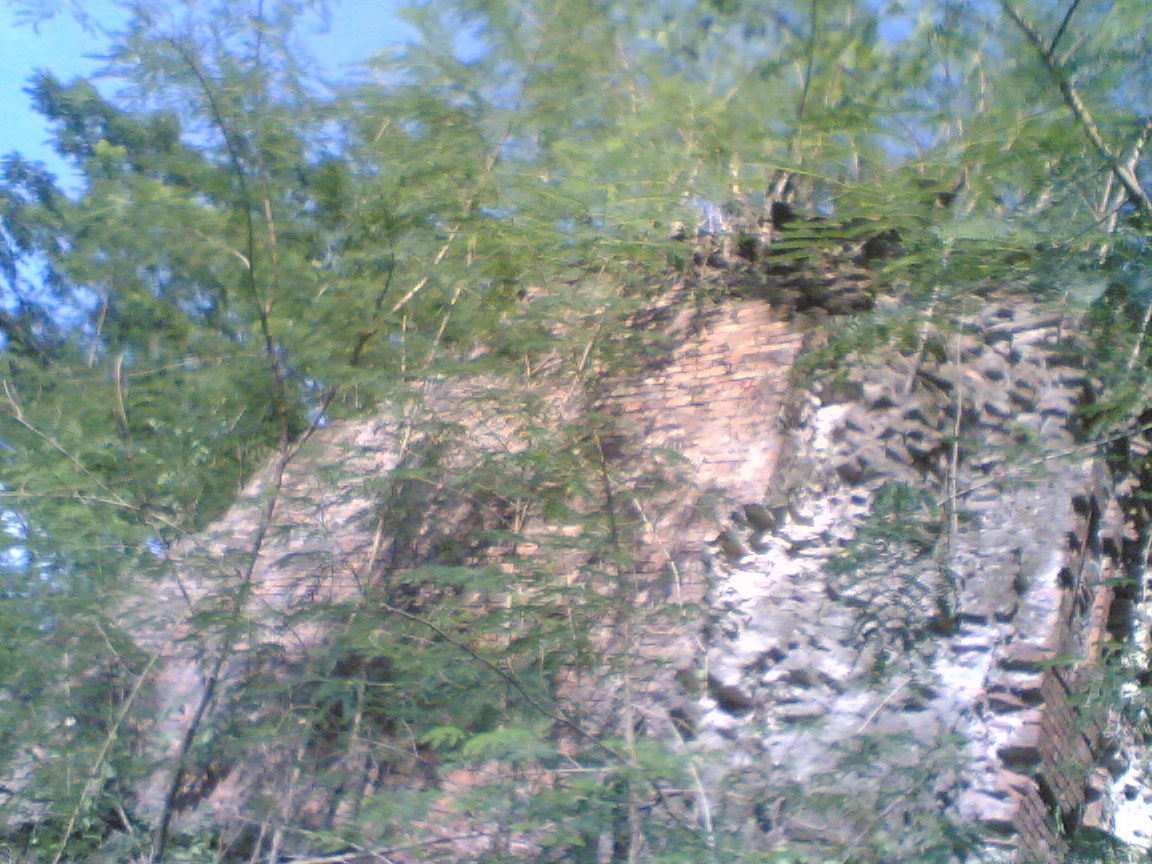
Nanikhir Nava-Ratna Temple, built during the period of Mughal rule.

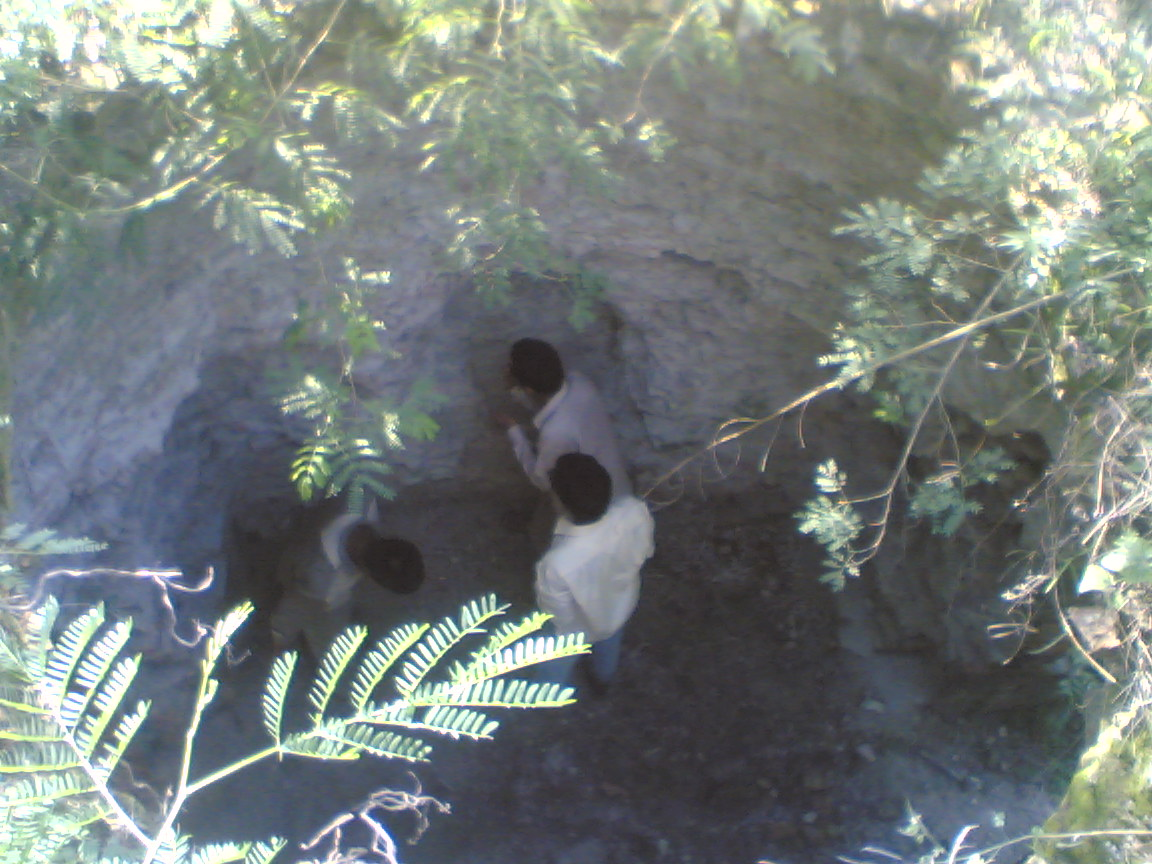
Nanikhir Nava-Ratna Temple.
