= Kasalia =

- Village
- Location in Bangladesh
- Coordinates: 23°15′N 89°55′E
- Country: Bangladesh
- Division: Dhaka Division
- District: Gopalganj District
- Upazila: Muksudpur Upazila

Area
  - Total: 4 km^{2} (1.5 sq mi)

Population
  - Total: 4,500
  - Density: 1,100/km^{2} (2,900/sq mi)
- Time zone: UTC+6 (Bangladesh Time)

Kasalia is a village in Gopalganj District, Bangladesh, part of Muksudpur Upazila. The village covers an area of 4 km^{2}, and is bordered by the villages of Nanikhir, Gunohar, Nawkhanda and Mosna, Goinary. Pathorghata's main canal is the Hatashe Channel and flow up to Kasalia . The Bil Rout Canal at Jalirpar joins with the Hatashe Canal to the river Padma

Kasalia also is a Union Parishad under was established in 1634 consist of eight number of villages. The village consists of three wards and few mahallas. The village has a high school, a primary school, seven mosques, a government hospital, and few community schools.

Non-governmental organizations operating in Pathorghata include BDAO (the Bangladesh Development Acceleration Organisation), BRAC, CCDB, ASA, World Vision, and HCCB.
