= Baliakandi =

- Upazila
- Location in Bangladesh
- Coordinates: 23.635°N 89.548°E
- Country: Bangladesh
- Division: Dhaka Division
- District: Rajbari District (Bangladesh)
- Upazila: Baliakandi Upazila
- Time zone: UTC+6 (Bangladesh Time)

Baliakandi is a small town in Rajbari District, Bangladesh, part of Baliakandi Upazila and Baliakandi Union.

Non-governmental organisations operating in Baliakandi include BDAO (the Bangladesh Development Acceleration Organisation), BRAC, CCDB, ASA, World Vision, and HCCB.

== Agriculture ==
The main crops grown in Baliakandi are paddy, wheat, jute, sugarcane, onion, garlic, betel leaf, vegetables and sweet potato. Formerly, the village also grew linseed, sesame, indigo, china, kaun, but these are rarely grown any more.

Baliakandi also produces the fruits mango, jackfruit, papaya, palm, guava, lemon, litchi, coconut, guava, and banana.

There are fisheries, hatcheries, poultry and dairy farms in Baliakandi. Some fishermen depend on the waters of the local pond, beels and river for their livelihood.
