= Paschim Naokhanda =

- Village
- Location in Bangladesh
- Coordinates: 23°14′56″N 89°57′19″E
- Country: Bangladesh
- Division: Dhaka Division
- District: Gopalganj District
- Upazila: Muksudpur Upazila
- Time zone: UTC+6 (Bangladesh Time)

Paschim Naokhanda is a village in Nanikhir Union under Muksudpur Upazila of Gopalganj District, Bangladesh. The village is bordered by the villages of Nanikhir, Baro Bhatra, Pathorgatha, and Kasalia.

According to the 2011 Bangladesh census, Paschim Naokhanda had 342 households and a population of 1,707. Islam was the majority religion (99.7% of the population). 12.4% of the population was under the age of 5. The literacy rate (age 7 and over) was 54.5%, compared to the national average of 51.8%.
