= Patharghata, Gopalgonj =

Patharghata
- Village
- Location in Bangladesh
- Coordinates: 23°14′40″N 89°57′18″E
- Country: Bangladesh
- Division: Dhaka Division
- District: Gopalganj District
- Upazila: Muksudpur Upazila
- Time zone: UTC+6 (Bangladesh Time)

Patharghata is a village in Nanikhir Union under Muksudpur Upazila of Gopalganj District, Bangladesh. The village is bordered by the villages of Nanikhir, Baro Bhatra, Paschim Naokhanda, and Kasalia.

According to the 2011 Bangladesh census, Paschim Naokhanda had 94 households and a population of 434. All the residents identified as Muslim. 11.8% of the population was under the age of 5. The literacy rate (age 7 and over) was 35.0%, compared to the national average of 51.8%.
