= Bhumsara =

- Village
- Location in Bangladesh
- Coordinates: 23°17′N 89°54′E
- Country: Bangladesh
- Division: Dhaka Division
- District: Gopalganj District
- Upazila: Muksudpur Upazila
- Time zone: UTC+6 (Bangladesh Time)

Bhumsara is a village in Gopalganj District, Bangladesh, part of Muksudpur Upazila and Bhabrasur Union.
