= Padamdi Nawab Estate =

Palace in Bangladesh

Padamdi Nawab Estate (Bengali: পদমদীর নবাবী) was the estate of the Nawabs of Padamdi, an aristocratic family from present day Rajbari District in Bangladesh.

== History ==
=== Origin ===
The fief was established in 1607 by a decree from the Mughal Emperor Jahangir to the Islamic clergyman and Iraqi immigrant Syed Shah Pahlowan whose family was initially composed of Muslim preachers and missionaries. The family also claims descent from the Islamic prophet Muhammad for which they used the title "Syed".

=== Imperial services ===
Mughal Emperor Shahjahan bestowed the title of Mir to the family for commanding Mughal Artillery. Later members of the family also served in the artillery corps of the British Indian Army, Pakistan Army and Bengal Army. In 1971, members of the estate actively took part in the Bangladesh Liberation War for Bangladesh.

=== Family ===
The family frequently intermarried with the members of the estate of Delduar which is situated in Tangail, Bangladesh. The Padamdi estate is situated beside the river Padma (Ganges) in Bangladesh, and produced notable writers, the most famous of which is Mir Mosharraf Hossain. His brother, Mir Mohammad Ali, was the erstwhile zamindar of Padamdi and the Zamindar Darpan (1872) drama series by Hossain was based on Ali. Hossain succeeded Ali after his death.

== Abolition ==
The estate was taken by the government in 1954, after the then Pakistan Government seized all landed estates vide a decree to equitably re-distribute the property to the landless poor. The estate was divided into two Thanas (smallest administrative units in Bangladesh) - Baliakandi and Pangsha under the district of Rajbari. The family still possesses most of the lands.

Lieutenant Colonel Syed Mir Ali Imam Al Mamun is the present head of the family.
