= Baharpur High School =

- বহরপুর উচ্চ বিদ্যালয় (Bengali)

Location
- Baharpur, Baliakandi, Rajbari - 7730; Bangladesh; 23.68570°N 89.567005°E

Information
- Type: Non-government, secondary school, mixed-gender education, day school
- Established: 1 January 1933
- School district: Dhaka Education Board
- School code: 113263
- Headmaster: Md Abdul Mazid Sheikh
- Faculty: Science; Business studies; Humanities
- Teaching staff: 19
- Grades: Class 6 to 10
- Education system: National Curriculum and Textbook Board
- Language: Bangla
- Campus type: Rural, non-residential

Baharpur High School (Bengali: বহরপুর উচ্চ বিদ্যালয়) is a secondary school situated at Baharpur, Baliakandi, Rajbari, Bangladesh. It was established in 1933. Its EIIN is 113263. Its an Institute that practices co-education. The institute's MPO number is 3301091301. This school operates independently by the Managing Committee.
