= Goalanda =

Goalanda may refer to the following places:

- Goalanda Upazila, a subdistrict of Dhaka, Bangladesh
- Goalundo Ghat, a town in Goalanda Upazila
