= Bhabrasur =

- Village
- Location in Bangladesh
- Coordinates: 23°17′N 89°53′E
- Country: Bangladesh
- Division: Dhaka Division
- District: Gopalganj District
- Upazila: Muksudpur Upazila
- Time zone: UTC+6 (Bangladesh Time)

Bhabrasur is a village in Gopalganj District, Bangladesh, part of Muksudpur Upazila and Bhabrasur Union.

Non-governmental organizations operating in Bhabrasur include BDAO (the Bangladesh Development Acceleration Organisation), BRAC, CCDB, ASA, World Vision, and HCCB.

== Agriculture ==
The main crops grown in Bhabrasur are paddy, wheat, jute, sugarcane, onion, garlic, betel leaf, vegetables and sweet potato. Formerly, the village also grew linseed, sesame, indigo, china, kaun, but these are rarely grown anymore.

Bhabrasur also produces the fruits Mango, jackfruit, papaya, palm, guava, lemon, litchi, coconut, guava, and banana.

There are fisheries, hatcheries, poultry and dairy farms in Bhabrasur. Some fishermen depend on the waters of the local pond, bills and river for their daily livelihood.
