= Mir Mosharraf Hossain =

Bengali writer (1847-1912)

Nawabzada Mir Syed Mosharraf Hossain
- মীর মুশাররফ হুসাইন
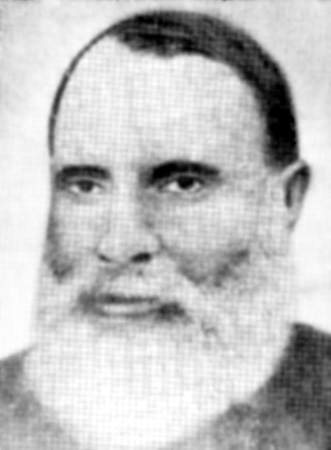
- Born: November 15, 1847; Lahinipara, Bengal, British India
- Died: December 19, 1911 (aged 64); Padamdi, Faridpur, British India
- Notable work: Bishad Shindhu
- Spouses: 'Azeezu-nn-Nisaa; Bibi Kulsum

Mir Syed Mosharraf Hossain (Bengali: মীর মুশাররফ হুসাইন; 13 November 1847– 19 December 1911) was a Bengali writer, novelist, playwright, and essayist. He is considered to be the first major writer to emerge from the Shia society of Bengal, and one of the finest prose writers in the Bengali language. His magnum opus Bishad Shindhu (Ocean of Sorrow) is a popular classic among the Bengali readership.

== Early life ==
Mir Syed Mosharraf Hossain was born in the village of Lahinipara in Kumarkhali Thana under Kushtia District. He spent most of his life at his ancestral Padamdi Nawab Estate in Baliakandi, then part of the erstwhile Faridpur District (now in Rajbari District). His widely accepted date of birth is 13 November 1847. But some researchers also claim his date of birth is 26 October 1847. His father was Nawab Syed Mir Moazzem Hossain, a Bengali Shia Muslim aristocrat and the Zamindar of the Padamdi Nawab Estate. His mother Daulatunnesa Begum, was a convert from Hinduism, her own family being a Bengali Hindu Zamindar family.

Mosharraf Hossain learned Arabic and Persian with a teacher at home and then Bengali at a pathsala. He began his formal education at Kushtia School and then studied up to Class V at Krishnanagar Collegiate School. He was admitted to Kalighat School in Kolkata but could not complete his studies. Mosharraf Hossain began his career looking after his father's landed property. Later he served the Faridpur Padamdi Nawab Estate and, in 1885, the Delduar Zamindari Estate. He lived in Kolkata from 1903 to 1909.

== Career ==
While still a student, Mosharraf Hossain worked as a mofussil reporter for the Sangbad Prabhakar (1861) and Gram Barta Prokashika (1863). His literary career started here.

=== Literary career ===
Syed Mir Mosharraf Hossain's magnum opus is Bishad Shindhu, depicting the Shia version of the tale of martyrdom of Hasan and Husayn in Karbala. He was one of the first Shia writers to emerge from colonial British India. His other works include Jamidar Darpan (Reflections on Zamindars), a play on the plight of common people under the Zamindars (landlords installed by the British colonial government) and their struggle against them.

His literary works were included in the curriculum of school level, secondary, higher secondary and graduation level Bengali Literature in Bangladesh. Mir Mosharraf Hossain wrote his 'Jamidar Darpan' about the background of the peasant uprising against the landlords in Sirajganj 1872–73. He had always shown an active interest in the everyday life of his fellow countrymen. He assisted Rowshan Ali Chowdhury in publishing The Kohinoor monthly.

== Personal life ==
In 1865 he married Aziz-un-Nesa. His second wife was Bibi Kulsum married in 1874. He died on 19 December 1911.

== Works ==
=== Novels ===
- Rotnoboti (14 August 1869)
- Bishad Shindhu (1885–1891) Also translated into English as Ocean of Sorrow and published in 2016 in 3 volumes:
1. Muharram (May 1885)
2. Uddhaar (The Rescue) (August 1887)
3. Yazeed-Bodh (The Slaying of Yazeed) (March 1891)
- Udasheen Pothik er Mon er Kawtha (August 1890) - autobiographical novel
- Tahmina (January-April 1897) - serialised in the monthly newspaper, Haafiz

=== Drama ===
- Basantakumari (1873)
- Jamidar Darpan (1873)
- Behula Gitavinoya (1889)
- Niyoti Ki Abonoti (1898)
- Gazi miar Bostani

=== Poetry ===
- Gorai Bridge or Gouri Setu (1873)

=== Essay ===
- Gojibon

=== Autobiographical ===
- Amar Jiboni (autobiography)
- Bibi Kulsum

=== Others ===
- The Azizan Nehar
- Gazi Miar Bostani
- Bajimat
- Bibi Khodejar Bibaho
- Hazrart Umarer Dharmo Jibon Labh
- Musolmaner Bangla Shikhya-1
- Musolmaner Bangla Shikhya-2
