= Bangram =

- Village
- Location in Bangladesh
- Coordinates: 23°14′N 89°57′E
- Country: Bangladesh
- Division: Dhaka Division
- District: Gopalganj District
- Upazila: Muksudpur Upazila
- Time zone: UTC+6 (Bangladesh Time)

Bangram is a village in Nanikhir Union under Muksudpur Upazila of Gopalganj District, Bangladesh. The village is bordered by the villages of Jalirpar, Baro Bhatra and others.

According to the 2011 Bangladesh census, Bangram had 421 households and a population of 1,996. Hinduism was the majority religion (83.4% of the population). Muslims were the second-largest religious community (16.5% of the population). 8.6% of the population was under the age of 5. The literacy rate (age 7 and over) was 66.5%, compared to the national average of 51.8%.
