= Harunur Rashid (Rajbari politician) =

Bangladeshi politician

Members of Parliament
- Incumbent
- Assumed office 17 February 2026
- Preceded by: Md. Zillul Hakim
- Constituency: Rajbari-2

Personal details
- Party: Bangladesh Nationalist Party
- Occupation: Politician

Harunur Rashid is a Bangladeshi politician the Bangladesh Nationalist Party. He was elected as the Member of Parliament for the Rajbari-2 constituency in the 2026 Bangladeshi general election held on 12 February 2026.

== Early life ==
Harun was born on 1 July 1970 in Machpara, Pangsha. His father's name is Matiar Rahman.
