= Rajbari-2 =

Constituency of Bangladesh's Jatiya Sangsad

Coordinates: 23.76°N 89.64°E

- Constituency for the Jatiya Sangsad
- District: Rajbari District
- Division: Dhaka Division
- Electorate: 462,473 (2018)

Current constituency
- Created: 1984
- Member: Harunur Rashid
- ← 209 Rajbari-1 211 Faridpur-1 →

Rajbari-2 is a constituency represented in the Jatiya Sangsad (National Parliament) of Bangladesh.

== Boundaries ==
The constituency encompasses Pangsha, Kalukhali and Baliakandi upazilas.

== Members of Parliament ==
Election	Member	Party
1986	Nazir Hossain Chowdhury	Jatiya Party
1988	Moslem Uddin	Combined opposition
1991	AKM Aszad	Jamaat-e-Islami
February 1996	Khandaker Sadrul Amin Habib	Bangladesh Nationalist Party
June 1996	Md. Zillul Hakim	Awami League
2001	Nasirul Haque Sabu	Bangladesh Nationalist Party
2008	Md. Zillul Hakim	Awami League
2026	Harunur Rashid	BNP
