= Goalgram =

- Village
- Location in Bangladesh
- Coordinates: 23°12′59″N 89°57′45″E
- Country: Bangladesh
- Division: Dhaka Division
- District: Gopalganj District
- Upazila: Muksudpur Upazila

Area
  - Total: 1.4 sq mi (3.6 km^{2})

Population
  - Total: 2,700
  - Density: 1,900/sq mi (750/km^{2})
- Time zone: UTC+6 (Bangladesh Time)

Goalgram is a village in Gopalganj District, Bangladesh, part of Muksudpur Upazila. The village is bordered by the villages of Nanikhir, Barovatra, Mahishtali, and Jalirpar.

According to the 2011 Bangladesh census, Goalgram had 384 households and a population of 3,446. 10.7% of the population was under the age of 5. The literacy rate (age 7 and over) was 47.6%.
