= Nasirul Haque Sabu =

Bangladeshi politician

- নাসিরুল হক সাবু

Member of Parliament
- In office 10 October 2001 – 29 October 2006
- Preceded by: Md. Zillul Hakim
- Succeeded by: Md. Zillul Hakim
- Constituency: Rajbari-2

Personal details
- Born: Rajbari, East Pakistan
- Party: Bangladesh Nationalist Party

Nasirul Haque Sabu (Bengali: নাসিরুল হক সাবু) is a Bangladesh Nationalist Party politician and a former member of parliament for Rajbari-2.

== Career ==
Sabu was elected to parliament from Rajbari-2 as a Bangladesh Nationalist Party candidate in 2001. He is the president of the Rajbari District unit of the Bangladesh Nationalist Party.
