= Muslim Uddin =

Bangladeshi politician

- মুসলেম উদ্দিন

Member of Bangladesh Parliament

Member of Parliament for Rajbari-2
- In office 1988–1990
- Preceded by: Nazir Hossain Chowdhury
- Succeeded by: AKM Aszad

Personal details
- Political party: Combined opposition

Muslim Uddin (Bengali: মুসলেম উদ্দিন) is a Bangladeshi politician and a former member of the Bangladesh Parliament for Rajbari-2.

== Career ==
Uddin was elected to parliament from Rajbari-2 as a combined opposition candidate in 1988.
