= RMB (disambiguation) =

The Renminbi (RMB) is the currency of the People's Republic of China.

RMB may also refer to:

== Commerce ==
- Rand Merchant Bank, a major South African corporate and investment bank
- RMB Holdings, a South African financial services holding company
- RMB (company), a subsidiary of the Royal Typewriter Company
- Rocky Mountain Bicycles, a Canadian bicycle manufacturer

== Culture ==
- RMB (band)
- Ryan Montbleau Band, Boston-based musicians

== Economics ==
- Malaysian ringgit, also sometimes referred to as RMB
- Money supply, sometimes referred to as real money balances, the supply of money available to the public
- Internationalization of the renminbi

== Education ==
- Rajdharpur Madhyamik Bidyalay, a secondary school in Bangladesh

== Sports ==
- Real Madrid Baloncesto, a Spanish professional basketball team
- Rødovre Mighty Bulls, a Danish professional ice hockey team

== Technology ==
- Right Mouse Button on a computer mouse
- Rocky Mountain BASIC

== Other uses ==
- Restaurant Miniature Buffet, a type of British Railways Mark 1 coach
- RMB-93 (ruzhyo magazinnoye boyevoye model 1993), a Russian combat shotgun
- Rumbia LRT station (LRT station abbreviation), a Light Rail Transit station in Sengkang, Singapore
