= The Azizan Nehar =

Defunct Bengali newspaper

The Azizan Nehar আজীজন নেহার
- Type: Monthly newspaper Weekly newspaper
- Editor: Mir Mosharraf Hossain
- Founded: April 14, 1874; 152 years ago
- Language: Bengali
- City: Kushtia
- Country: British India

The Azizan Nehar (Bengali: আজীজন নেহার) was a newspaper edited by Mir Mosharraf Hossain. It was first published in 1874. It was the first Bengali-language newspaper edited by a Shia Muslim individual.

== Naming ==
Mir Mosharraf Hossain’s first wife was Azizan Nesa. Later, in 1873, he married a woman named Kulsum. Shortly after the marriage, in 1874, he published the newspaper Azizan Nehar, named after his first wife. Many criticized this choice of name. For example:

Why would Mir edit and publish a newspaper in the name of that wife? As already mentioned, Mir married Bibi Kulsum in the month of Magh, 1280 (Bengali calendar), and Azizan Nehar was first published in the month of Baishakh, 1281. Munir Chowdhury naturally assumed that behind this publication was ‘years of speculation’ and a passionate ‘heart of a husband’ at work. But that may not be entirely true. If it were truly the ‘husband’s heart’ that motivated this publication, then the marriage with Bibi Kulsum would not have taken place so long afterward. A particularly noteworthy point is that within a few months of marrying Kulsum, he published the newspaper in the name of his first with Mir’s half-brother Mir Saheb Ali and the bandit Nuruddin to eliminate Kulsum. There is no doubt that she was deeply hurt and bitter about Mir’s second marriage (and possibly expressed it as well). So, was the hurried editing and publication of this newspaper merely a way to bribe or appease the first wife? It is not impossible.

— Shantanu Kaiser, Tritiyo Mir,

== History ==
The Azizan Nehar newspaper was first published on the 1st of Boishakh, 1281 in the Bengali calendar. According to the autobiography of Mir Mosharraf Hossain and the Hitakrishi newspaper, Ajijan Nehar was published from Kushtia. However, it was during his stay in Hugli-Chuchura that Mir conceived the idea of publishing this newspaper.

There are differing opinions regarding the nature and characteristics of Azizan Nehar Nehar.

== External ==
- Khandaker Shamim Ahmed. "মীর মশাররফ হোসেনের সাংবাদিক সত্তা" [Mir Mosharraf Hossain's journalistic personality] (PDF). Jahangirnagar University (in Bengali). pp. 41–46. Archived from the original (PDF) on 2024-04-11.
- THE MUSLIM HERITAGE OF BENGAL (PDF). England: Kube publishing Ltd. 2013. ISBN 9781847740625.
