= Rajdharpur =

Rajdharpur রাজধরপুর
- Village
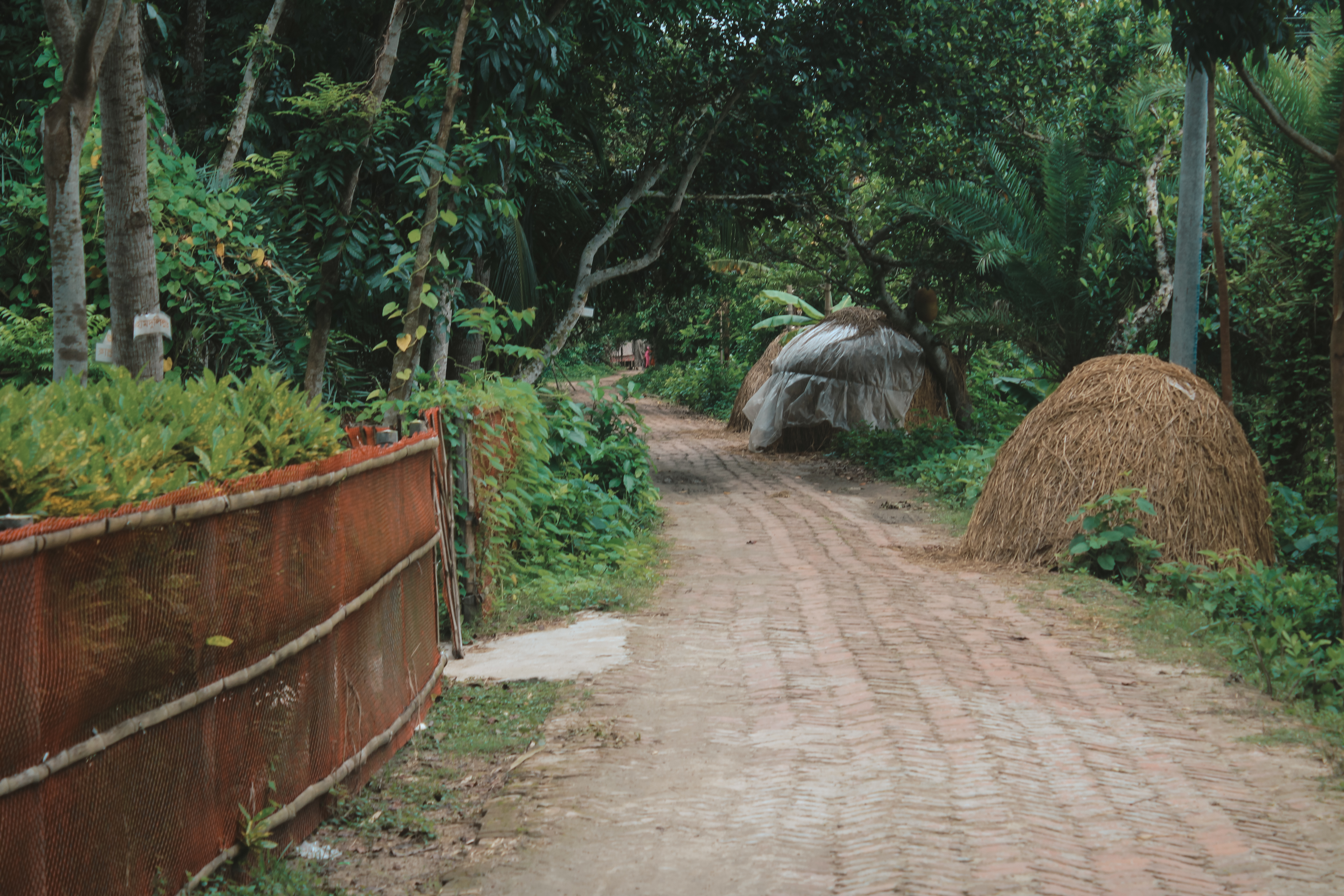
- Street that connects Alikhapara and Boroichara, two out of seven neighbours inside Rajdharpur village.

- Location in Bangladesh
- Coordinates: 23.7227511°N 89.5776691°E
- Country: Bangladesh
- Division: Dhaka
- District: Rajbari
- Upazila: Baliakandi
- Time zone: UTC+6 (Bangladesh Time)
- Aerial postal code: 7730

Rajdharpur (Bengali: রাজধরপুর) is a village in Rajbari District, Bangladesh, part of Baliakandi Upazila and Islampur Union.

== Education ==
- Rajdharpur Madhyamik Bidyalay
- Rajdharpur Government Primary School
- Rajdharpur Kindergarten
