= Kazi Abul Kasem =

- কাজী আবুল কাসেম
- Born: 7 May 1913; Jhenaidah, Bengal Presidency, British India
- Died: 19 July 2004 (aged 91); Dhaka, Bangladesh
- Occupations: painter, political cartoonist, poet, short-story writer, novelist, essayist
- Spouse: Hasina Begum (m. 1937–1992)
- Awards: Bangla Academy Literary Award

Kazi Abul Kasem, (7 May 1913 – 19 July 2004) pseudonym Dopiaza, was a Bangladeshi polymath, pathfinder creative professional who is known as the very first Muslim cartoonist in the Indian subcontinent. Painting and drawing cartoons for many different renowned magazines from 1937 to 1980, Kasem have played different roles in his region from using arts to influence political movement to paint masterpieces for the national museum.

Kasem was awarded for painting best cover art for children's publication by Bangla Academy, he was awarded for promoting child literature twice in a row by National Book Council of Bangladesh. Many of his assorted line drawings and illustrations were used in school's national textbook.

== Early life ==
Kasem was born in his uncle’s house in Umedpur, Shailkupa, Jhenaidah to Kazi Makbul Ali and Meher Un Nisa Khatun. By the age of five, he had lost both of his parents and was subsequently raised by his maternal uncles. Initially, he enrolled in a local pathshala taught by Baser Munshi, a strict and often abusive teacher. Disturbed by Munshi’s harsh disciplinary methods, Kasem transferred to Akharjani Primary School, where he first discovered his interest in art through a drawing of an Ilish fish by the school’s headmaster.

While living with his maternal uncles, Kasem continued his education at G. T. Elementary School, completing the fourth grade. He then skipped fifth grade and enrolled at Baliakandi High School in Pangsha. In seventh grade, he received a Bursary for his exceptional performance on final exams.

Kasem’s initial fascination with art stemmed from colored nature paintings once collected by his mother, Meher Un Nisa. He was further inspired by the works of Abinash Chandra Sarkar and Nagendranath Kabiraj. However, because his uncles held strong religious views, Kasem practiced drawing and painting in secret. At this crucial stage in his life, his older brother, Kazi Abul Hosen (1911–1974), who authored works of fiction, encouraged him to continue pursuing his artistic ambitions.

== Calcutta: 1926–1950 ==
Kasem's artwork was spotted by a padre named Reverend Barber, Barber acknowledges the potential artist living within the young artist and takes Kasem with him to provide an opportunity by finding admission to Calcutta Government School of Art. Kasem passes the entry examination but unfortunately, he was too young to start his college life there and forced to return to his motherland.

Kasem focuses on studying seventh grade in Baliakandihigh school after returning from Calcutta for the first time, meanwhile his older brother Kazi Abul Hosen convinced his younger brother to join him on a journey to Assam a state of India located north-east from Bangladesh, Kasem was convinced upon realizing that he will have the chance to paint additional natural scenery up there. They start their journey to Assam and Kasem puts an end to his academic career. Kasem have drawn many oil paintings in Assam, most of them of nature only, he and his brother started taking shelter in random places at night, they start travelling Kamarupa, Kamakhya, Pandu, Guwahati, Lumding and many other places, mostly surrounded by rocky mountains or forestry. From excessive traveling, Kasem becomes fatigue and financially broke. As a result, Kasem start working as Railway Contractor in Lumding train station, that is how Kasem put an end to pursuing his academic career. After recovering from money crisis he takes a route leading to Calcutta instead home saying farewell to his older brother.

He, once again, sits for an admission to enter Calcutta Government School of Art, but this time, he was short funded and was rejected for the final time. Without having a chance enter in his dream institution, Kasem admits himself to another art school named Indian Art School in the same city. Understanding Kasem's situation, Shamsur Rahman a legendary poet, columnist, and journalist of Bangladesh tried to help him, but due to the poor standard of teaching of that school, Kasem dropped himself out once again.

Shamsur Rahman wrote on one of his books, Pochish Bochor (পচিশ বছর, twenty-five years);

[...] Artist Kazi Abul Kasem also joined in our office party of Tablighi (monthly tabloid, 1927) as a fourteen years old bohemian lad. As he was such a gifted artist, he was sent for an admission to Indian Art School. After few days he had explained that the nominal art school is not worth it, as they do not show how to create an art properly it will a waste of time for him to be there. So, he was sent to work with block maker N. Mittra, from there he never had to look back, the story unfolds only for him to explain how his creative wisdom was spread in time, his art became popular and as a result his artworks were published frequently in magazines like Probashi (প্রবাসী, abroad) and Bichitra (বিচিত্রা, attractions).

== Occupational life and homecoming ==
From the help of Shamsur Rahman, Kasem starts his professional career as an artist working for N. Mittra & co. a commercial art studio. Despite the fact of low monthly salary, Kasem bloomed into an aesthetic artist hence an asset of the studio. In 1941 he leaves the studio and starts working as an Artist Designer under culture department of Bengal Government. In early 1950 Kasem was appointed as an art instructor to teach students in Vocational Training Centre for Demobilized Personnel.
Kasem returns homeland Bengal Presidency of Khulna on mid fifty, he then moves to Dhaka and starts working as a freelance artist from his house. He had to hire a couple of art college interns for professional use due to overloading tasks from the clients. Meanwhile, he worked as a part-time art reviewer for the national textbook foundation. Until 1966 he worked full-time as art director for Franklin book programs. He resumed his freelance career after terminating the last job.

== Works ==
Known mostly for his paintings, Kasem drew caricatures, cartoons; written poems, rhymes, short stories and songs. His writings for children books were notable, he had painted the illustration for most of his books which were enriched with imagery. His cartoon and caricature were most notable for them politically playing a crucial role during the Language Movement. During his visit to Calcutta, many famous people such as Abanindranath Tagore the creator of Indian Society of Oriental Art, folklorist Gurusaday Dutt, leading Bengali novelists Tarasankar Bandyopadhyay and many more, who inspired him to chase his dream to become a pathfinder artist. While working in Calcutta, Kasem created quite a few drawing and illustrations of these great people which also brought him to the limelight.

=== Art and music ===
In his lifetime, Kasem has created hundreds of pictures, cartoons, and caricatures, a large portion of his arts were published in various famous magazines in Calcutta, also he painted a number paintings for exhibition, few among the exquisite creation of Kasem's arts are stored in Bangladesh National Museum, located in Shahbag open for public display.

There were three different kinds of Arts which Kasem researched for years;

1. Tender Arts
2. Landscape Painting
3. Caricatures

He drew traditional Tender Arts in a form of painting, in some of his pictures he introduced a different lining and texturing phenomena, which introduced a new trend in creative painting. He also blended live paints with caricature.

Dopiaza was the pseudonym Kasem used as a trademark sign after finishing with any political cartoons, his cartoons were published in Saogat, Hanafi and many other famous magazines based on renowned editorial board. Different newspapers such as Ittefaq, Daily Shangbad, Daily Azad use to publish his political cartoons.

A feature animation studio hired Kasem as key animator, he also worked as an inbetweener for making an animated feature called Shabash under producer V. P. Malik Debaprakash Malik in 1946 on Mumbai.

To take a break from constantly producing illustrations, paintings, and cartoons; Kasem used to practice music composition and singing, he uses to perform gigs on radio featuring as a vocal artist in All India Radio station in the mid-1940s. He was awarded silver medals twice for Outstanding Performance in Music by Shri Dev Narayan Dev, Councilor of Calcutta Corporation. From very young age Kasem was attracted to music, when he was in Calcutta he took lessons on Indian classical music, Ghazal and folk music from Ustaad Mohamed Husain Khasru (1903–1959), classical musician and composer; Ustad Abdul Karim Khan, Girija Shankar and Ustad Kader Baksh, known as the teacher of the most renowned tabla player of twentieth century.

Kasem has composed more than hundreds of songs, a book was published in 1967 from his selected 26 songs called Ganguli Mor (My songs), the book contained, Ragga (3), baul (1), Jhumur (1), Vatiyali (1), Ghazal (3) and Aadhunik (15) etc. 11 songs among the 26, were broadcast on Dhaka Radio Station, most of the songs were composed and instrumented by Ustad Kader Jameri.
