= Bishad Shindhu =

Epic novel by Mir Mosarraf Hussain

Bishad Shindhu [Ocean of Sorrow]
- Author: Mir Mosarraf Hussain
- Original title: বিষাদসিন্ধু
- Language: Bengali

Bishad Shindhu (Bengali: বিষাদ-সিন্ধু, English: Ocean of Sorrow) is a Bengali epic novel by Mir Mosarraf Hussain, the first modern Bengali Shia writer and novelist. Regarded as a central work of Bengali literature, and Hussain's finest literary achievement, the novel chronicles the Shia version of the lives of Muhammad's grandsons. (Hasan and Husayn), and the Battle of Karbala.

Bishad Shindhu was originally published in three parts in 1885, 1887 and 1891 respectively; the novel was first published in its entirety in 1891. However, it is not considered an authentic source for the history of Karbala, the location of Husayn's warfront, or the place of his death.

It contains much poetic language, and many dramatic scenes. At the time of its composition, there were few published novels in the Bengali language, and Mosharraf Hussain was part of a community of writers working to pioneer a new tradition of novels in Bengali. The novel was written in Shadhubhasha, a highly Sanskritised form of Bengali. It was translated into English for the first time by Prof. Fakrul Alam in 2016, published by the Bangla Academy in Dhaka under the title "Ocean of Sorrow".

== Main characters ==
- Hasan ibn Ali, elder brother of Husayn, grandson of Muhammad, son of Khalifa Ali ibn Abu Talib and Fatima Zahra
- Husayn ibn Ali, younger brother of Hasan, grandson of Muhammad, son of Khalifa Ali and Fatima
- Yazid ibn Mu'awiah (a son of a companion of Muḥammad ), a rival of Hasan and Husayn for the throne
- Shimar, Husayn's killer
