= Chandana River =

River in Bangladesh

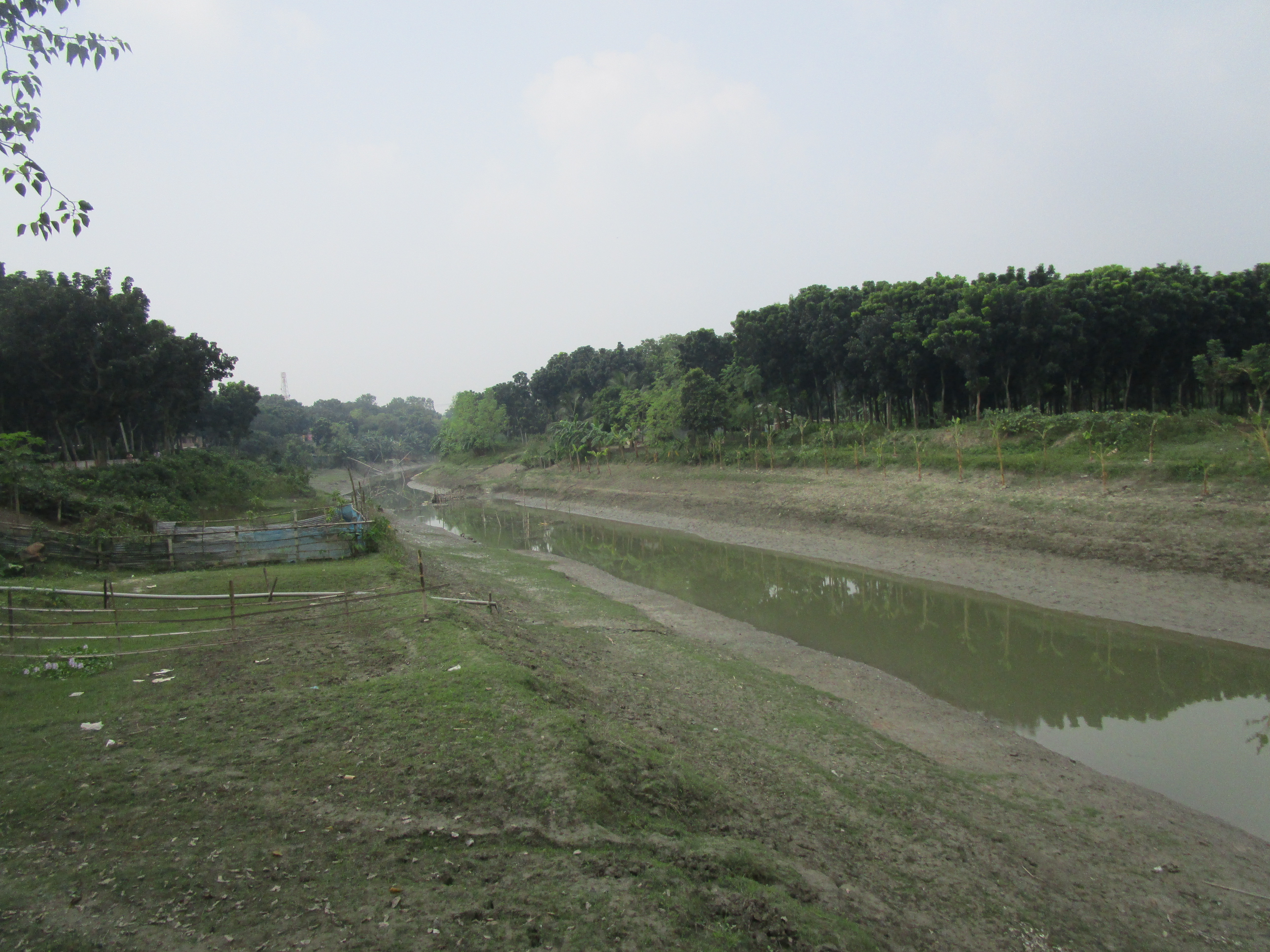
- Chandana River in Pangsha Upazila
- Native name: চন্দনা নদী (Bengali)

Location
- Country: Bangladesh
- Districts: Rajbari; Faridpur; Gopalganj

Physical characteristics
- Source: Padma River
  - location: Near Belgachhi, Khanganj, Kalukhali
- Mouth: Madhumoti River
  - location: Near Mitain Kamarkhali, Madhukhali
  - coordinates: 23°30′19″N 89°33′41″E
- Length: 125 km (78 mi)

The Chandana (Bengali: চন্দনা) is a river of the southwestern part of Bangladesh. The length of the river is 125 kilometers, the average width is 40 meters and the nature is spiral. The identity number of the river given by the Bangladesh Water Development Board is River No. 32 of south-western region.
