= Md Shafiqual Haque Choudhury =

Bangladeshi activist (1949–2021)

Md Shafiqual Haque Choudhury (1949 – 12 February 2021) was a Bangladeshi social activist and founder of Association for Social Advancement, one of the largest microfinance institution in the world. He was a former advisor of the Caretaker Government with the rank of a minister.

== Early life ==
Choudhury was born in 1949 in Naropati, Habiganj District, Sylhet Division, East Pakistan, Pakistan. He did his bachelor's degree and masters in sociology from the University of Dhaka.

== Career ==
Choudhury founded Association for Social Advancement, microcredit institution, in 1978 in Manikganj District and served as its chairperson since then.

Choudhury served as the advisor to Caretaker government from 2006 to 2007. He was in charge of the Ministry of Agriculture, Ministry of Youth and Sports, and Ministry of Cultural Affairs.

Choudhury stepped down as Chairman of Association for Social Advancement (ASA International) in December 2020 for health reasons and was replaced by Guy Dawson.

== Death ==
Choudhury died on 12 February 2021 at Square Hospital, Dhaka. He was buried at the Mirpur Intellectuals' Graveyard.
