= Khandaker Sadrul Amin Habib =

Bangladeshi politician

- খোন্দকার ছদরুল আমিন হাবিব

Member of Bangladesh Parliament

Member of Parliament for Rajbari-2
- In office 15 February 1996 – 12 June 1996
- Preceded by: AKM Aszad
- Succeeded by: Md. Zillul Hakim

Personal details
- Political party: Bangladesh Nationalist Party

Khandaker Sadrul Amin Habib (Bengali: খোন্দকার ছদরুল আমিন হাবিব) is a Bangladesh Nationalist Party politician and a former Member of Parliament from Rajbari-2.

== Career ==
Habib was elected to parliament from Rajbari-2 as a Bangladesh Nationalist Party candidate in 15 February 1996.
