= Nanikhir High School =

- ননীক্ষীর উচ্চ বিদ্যালয়
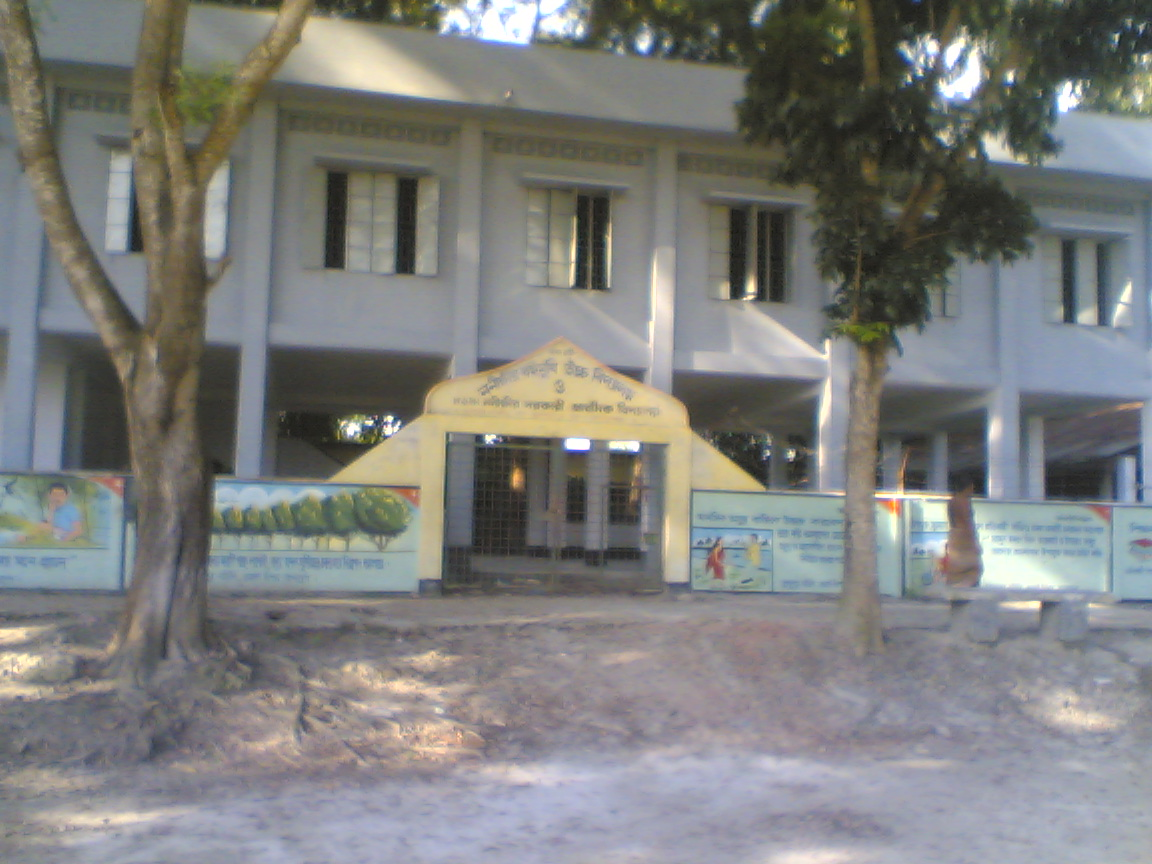

Location
- Nanikhir Bazar, Nanikhir; Muksudpur-Gopalganj, 7911; Bangladesh
- Coordinates: 23°08′N 89°34′E

Information
- School type: Public secondary school
- Opened: 1937
- School district: Gopalganj
- Principal: Mr. Biprodas Biwas (full time/regular) since 2011.
- Staff: 150
- Enrollment: 1,200 (2008)
- Student to teacher ratio: 10.3
- Language: Bengali
- Hours in school day: 7
- Website: nhschool.blogspot.com

Nanikhir High School (NHS) (Bengali: ননীক্ষীর উচ্চ বিদ্যালয়) is a secondary school in the town of Nanikhir, Gopalganj District, Bangladesh.

== History ==
Nanikhir High School was established during the British rule in Bangladesh in 1937. Some of the country's famous students studied there. Surendra Nath Dutta commonly known as SN Dutta was the founder of the Nanikhir High School, which founded ar 1937. Mr. Dutta has gone to India after India Pakistan formation at 1947. SN Dutta was assigned by a Force TC to higher study at England order by the British Government. He married a British woman when he lived in London. After return from England he founded two schools, one is Nanikhir High School and another was a girls school but the Nanikhir High School is still exist.
