= Nazir Hossain Chowdhury =

Bangladeshi politician

- নাজির হোসেন চৌধুরী

Member of Bangladesh Parliament

Member of Parliament for Rajbari-2
- In office 1986–1988
- Succeeded by: Muslim Uddin

Personal details
- Party: Jatiya Party (Ershad)

Nazir Hossain Chowdhury (Bengali: নাজির হোসেন চৌধুরী) is a Jatiya Party (Ershad) politician and a former member of parliament for Rajbari-2.

== Career ==
Chowdhury was elected to parliament from Rajbari-2 as a Jatiya Party candidate in 1986.
