= AKM Aszad =

Bangladeshi politician

- একেএম আসজাদ

Member of the Bangladesh Parliament for Rajbari-2
- In office 27 February 1991 – 15 February 1996
- Preceded by: Muslim Uddin
- Succeeded by: Khandaker Sadrul Amin Habib

Personal details
- Born: Rajbari
- Political party: Bangladesh Jamaat-e-Islami

AKM Aszad was a Bangladesh Jamaat-e-Islami politician from Rajbari District who was a member of parliament for the Rajbari-2 constituency.

== Career ==
Aszad was elected as a member of parliament for Rajbari-2 constituency as a candidate of Bangladesh Jamaat-e-Islami in the fifth parliamentary elections of 1991. He has died.
