= Md. Zillul Hakim =

Bangladeshi politician

- মোঃ জিল্লুল হাকিম
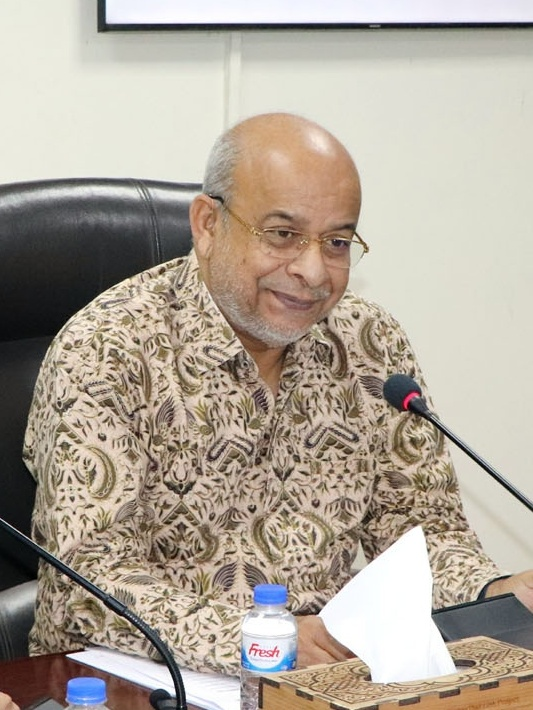
- Hakim in March 2024

Minister of Railways
- In office 11 January 2024 – 6 August 2024
- Prime Minister: Sheikh Hasina
- Preceded by: Md. Nurul Islam Sujon
- Succeeded by: Muhammad Fouzul Kabir Khan

Member of Parliament
- In office 7 January 2008 – 6 August 2024
- Preceded by: Nasirul Haque Sabu
- Constituency: Rajbari-2
- In office 13 June 1996 – 2 November 2001
- Preceded by: Khandaker Sadrul Amin Habib
- Succeeded by: Nasirul Haque Sabu
- Constituency: Rajbari-2

Personal details
- Born: 2 January 1954 (age 72) Rajbari, East Pakistan
- Party: Bangladesh Awami League
- Spouse: Saida Hakim
- Children: Ashiq Mahmud Mitul

Md. Zillul Hakim (born 2 January 1954) is a Bangladesh Awami League politician who served as the minister of railways and a former Jatiya Sangsad member representing the Rajbari-2 constituency for four consecutive terms.

== Early life ==
Hakim was born on 2 January 1954. He has a master's degree in art.

== Career ==
Hakim was elected to parliament for Rajbari-2 in 2008 and 2014 as a Bangladesh Awami League (BAL) candidate. On 6 March 2018, he inaugurated a BAL office built on 8 decimal of Zila Parishad and Water Development Board land in Baliakandi Upazila, Rajbari District.

On 16 January 2025, Anti-Corruption Commission of Bangladesh accused Hakim, his wife, Saida Hakim and their son, Ashiq Mahmud Mitul on charges of amassing illegal wealth.
