= Gurunath Sengupta =

Gurunath Sengupta (1848–1914) was a renowned Sanskrit scholar and poet. Born in Narail, in the district of Jessore, he achieved academic success by passing his triannual examinations from Kolkata Normal School in 1867. He earned the prestigious title of "Kaviratna," meaning "A gem among poets." Sengupta imparted his knowledge as a teacher at Ahiritola Bangabidyalay in Kolkata.

Throughout his life, Sengupta authored numerous works in Sanskrit and Bengali, encompassing a wide range of literary genres. His writings included volumes of poetry, commentaries, annotations, religious discourses, philosophical treatises, novels, and collections of essays. In the realm of Sanskrit literature, some of his notable works were "Satyadharma" (Eternal Religion), "Gunaratnam" (Virtues), "Satyamrta" (The Nectar of Truth), "Gunasutram" (Aphoristic Texts on Virtues), "Dharmajijvasa" (Religious Discourse), "Shhriramacharitam" (An Epic on Rama), "Shhrigaurabrttam" (Epic), "Baridutam" (The Rain Messenger), "Patnishatakam" (Verses on Wives), and "Shiksashatakam" (Verses on Education).

In Bengali literature, Sengupta's notable works included "Tattvajvan" (Philosophy), "Dampatidharmalap" (Religious Discourse of a Couple), "Adbhut Upakhyan" (A Strange Story), "Kamalini" (Epic), and "Subhadraharan" (Epic), which garnered admiration from readers.

Beyond his literary contributions, Gurunath Sengupta was also recognized as an advocate of spiritualism. Through years of rigorous ascetic practice and introspection, he attained enlightenment and propagated a new religious doctrine called "satyadharma" (eternal religion). This doctrine emphasized the elevation of the self through the practice of virtues, manifested in the worship of God.

Gurunath Sengupta's life and literary works left a lasting impact, highlighting his profound scholarship in Sanskrit and his pursuit of spiritual enlightenment.
