= Jalirpar =

Jalirpar (জলিরপাড়)
- Village
- Location in Bangladesh
- Coordinates: 22°58′N 90°06′E
- Country: Bangladesh
- Division: Dhaka Division
- District: Gopalganj District
- Upazila: Muksudpur Upazila

Area
  - Total: 1.2 sq mi (3 km^{2})

Population
  - Total: 2,300
  - Density: 1,900/sq mi (750/km^{2})
- Time zone: UTC+6 (Bangladesh Time)

Jalirpar is a Village and a Union too under Muksudpur Upazila, Gopalganj established in 1634.

The Bil Rout Canal travels through the village of Jalirpar on its way to the Padma River.

Non-governmental organizations operating in Jalirpar include BDAO (the Bangladesh Development Acceleration Organisation), BRAC, CCDB, ASA, World Vision, and HCCB.
