= Baro Bhatra =

- Village
- Location in Bangladesh
- Coordinates: 23°14′15″N 89°57′54″E
- Country: Bangladesh
- Division: Dhaka Division
- District: Gopalganj District
- Upazila: Muksudpur Upazila
- Union: Nanikhir Union

Population
  - Total: 3,127
- Time zone: UTC+6 (Bangladesh Time)

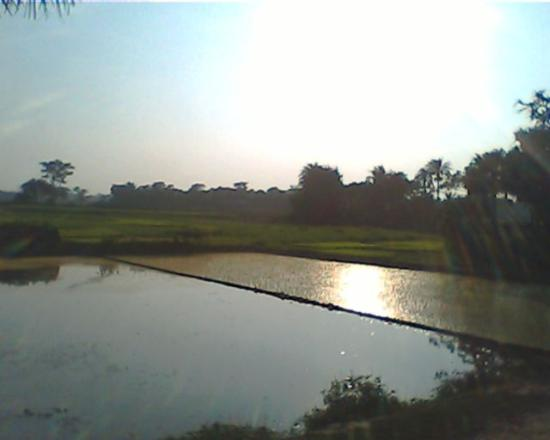
Baro Bhatra

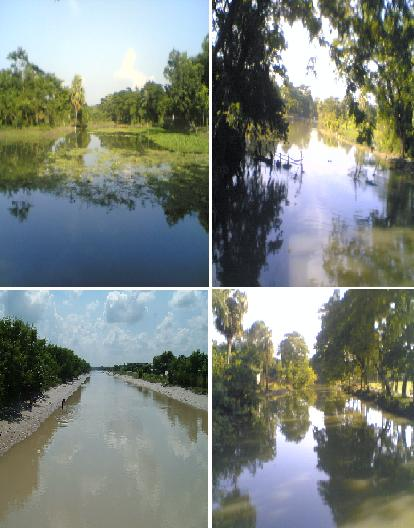
Main Channel in Baro Bhatra, Nanikhir, Nawkhanda and Pathorghata

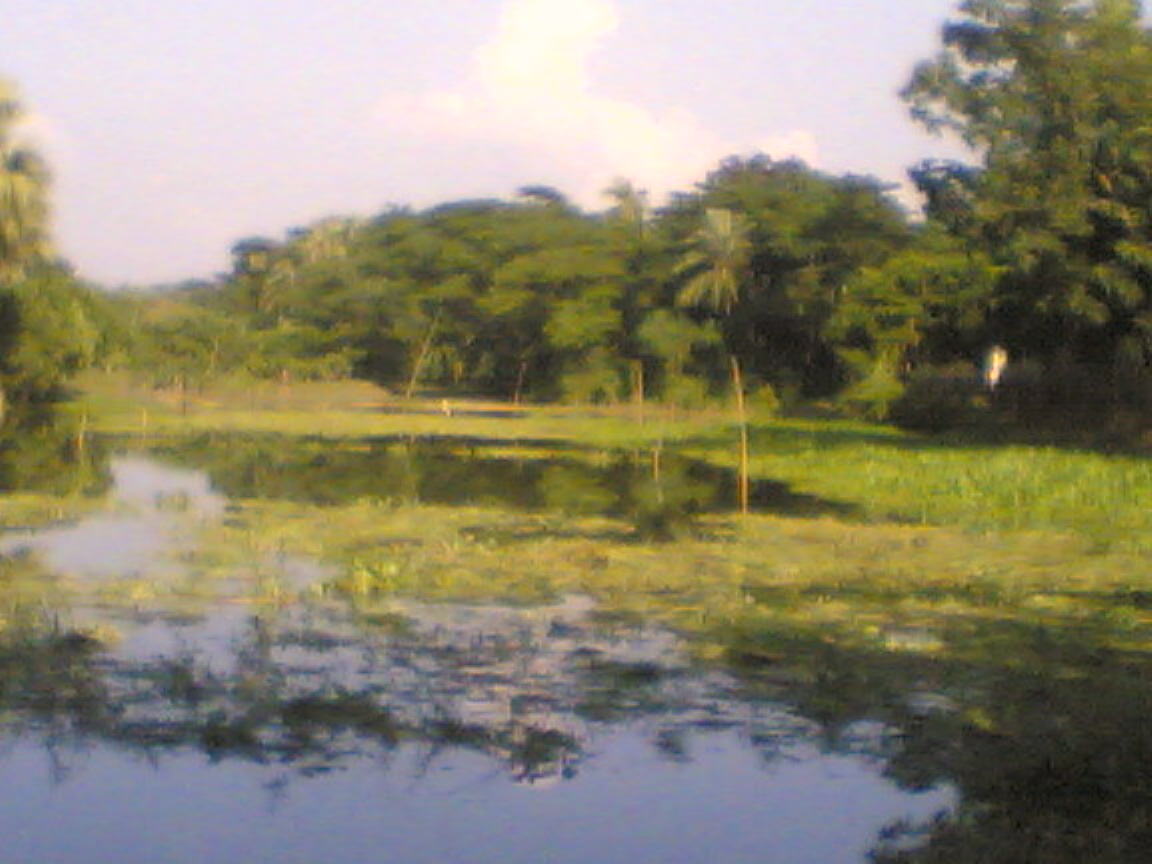
Nawkhanda Khall in Baro Bhatra

Baro Bhatra is a village in Nanikhir Union under Muksudpur Upazila of Gopalganj District, Bangladesh. The village is bordered by the villages of Nanikhir, Paschim Naokhanda, Patharghata and Bangram.

According to the 2011 Bangladesh census, Baro Bhatra had 586 households and a population of 3,127. Islam was the majority religion (92.1% of the population). Hindus were the second-largest religious community (7.9% of the population). 11.1% of the population was under the age of 5. The literacy rate (age 7 and over) was 52.8%, compared to the national average of 51.8%.
