= Rajbari District =

Rajbari District রাজবাড়ী জেলা
- District of Bangladesh
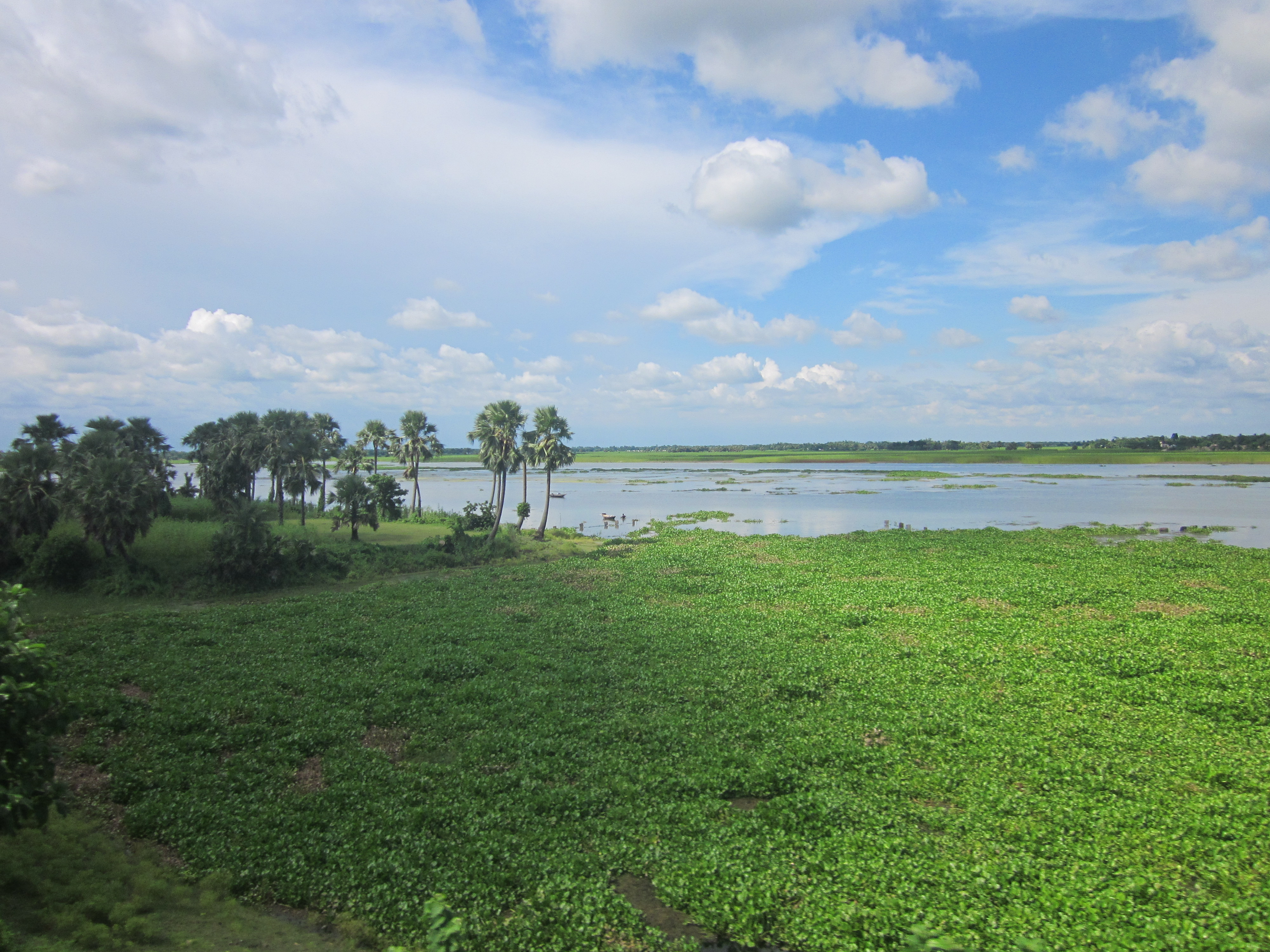
- Landscape of Rajbari District

- Location of Rajbari District in Bangladesh
- Expandable map of Rajbari District
- Coordinates: 23.70°N 89.50°E
- Country: Bangladesh
- Division: Dhaka
- Established: 1984
- Headquarters: Rajbari

Government
  - Deputy Commissioner: Dilsad Begum
  - District Council Chairman: Vacant

Area
  - Total: 1,118.80 km^{2} (431.97 sq mi)

Population (2022)
  - Total: 1,189,818
  - Density: 1,063.48/km^{2} (2,754.39/sq mi)
- Demonym: Rajbarian
- Time zone: UTC+06:00 (BST)
- Postal code: 7700
- Area code: 0641
- ISO 3166 code: BD-53
- HDI (2018): 0.596 medium · 11th of 21
- Website: www.rajbari.gov.bd

Rajbari District (Bengali: রাজবাড়ী জেলা) is a district in central Bangladesh, located in Dhaka Division.

== History ==
During the reign of Mughal emperor Jahangir, a fief in Padamdi was decreed to the family of an Iraqi Muslim immigrant by the name of Syed Shah Pahlwan in 1607. The zamindari family, known as the Nawabs of Padamdi actively commanded the artillery and served the Mughal army, eventually leading to Emperor Shah Jahan bestowing them the title of Mir.

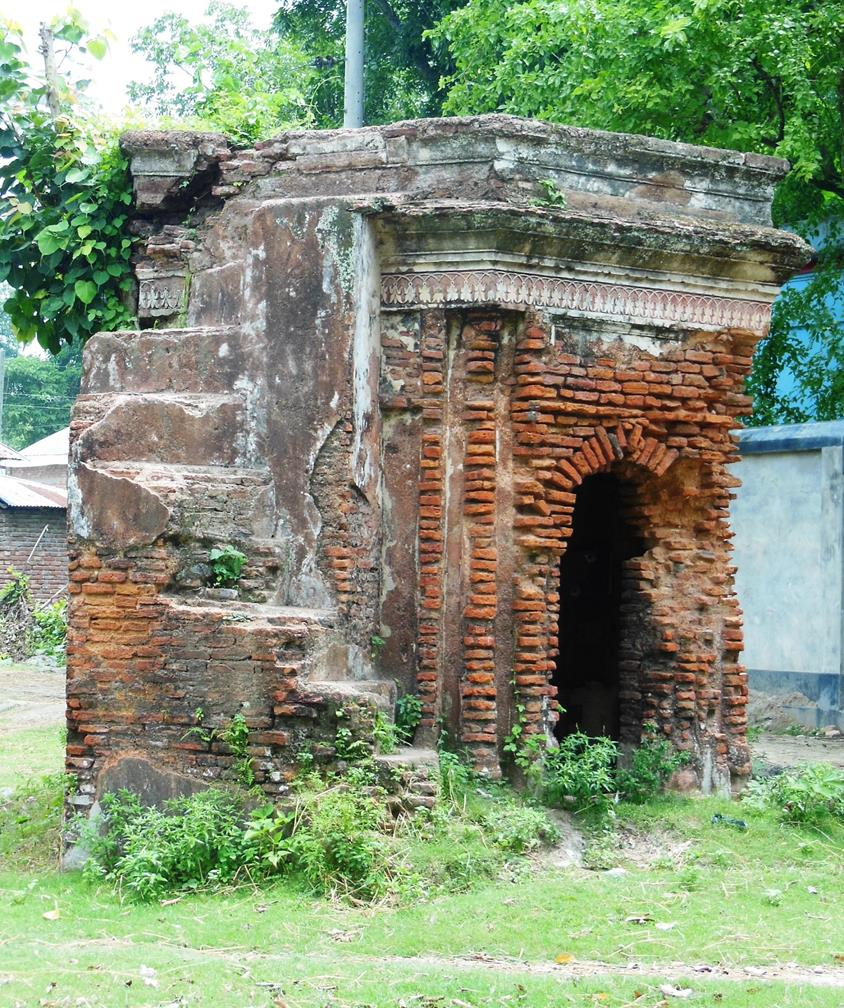
Historic ruins in Rajbari

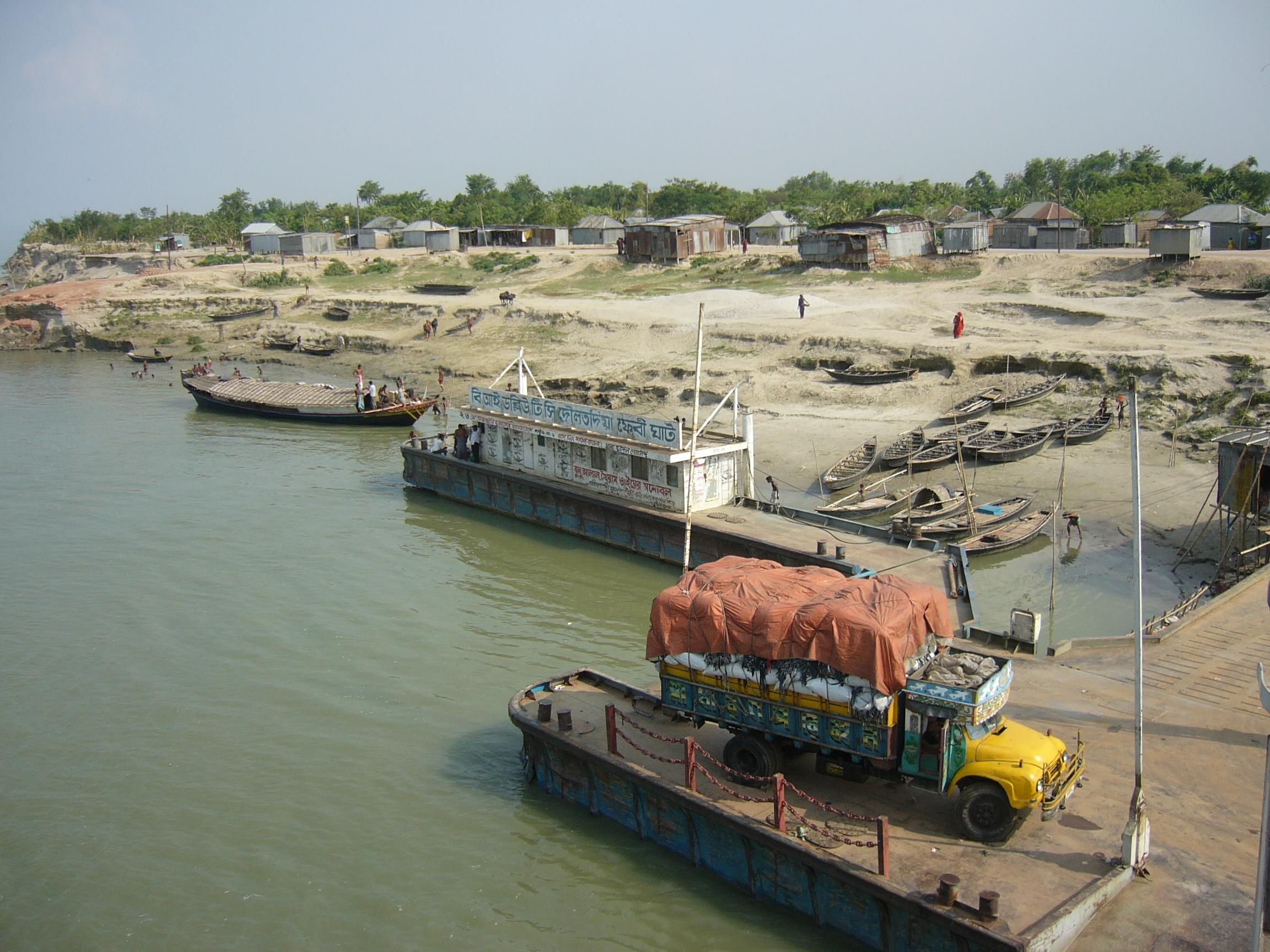
Daulatdia Ghat, Rajbari, Bangladesh

Rajbari in the Bengali language means palace, and pays homage to the rich zamindari families that feudally ruled modern-day Rajbari. In the 17th century, the Mughal governor of Bengal, Shaista Khan, appointed Sangram Shah of Panchthupi as the Nawara of what is present-day Rajbari in order to suppress the Portuguese pirates. The Nawara settled permanently in the populated neighbourhood of Banibaha and built a fort at a place called Lalgola. Sangram Shah and his family later became known as the Nawara Chowdhuries of Banibaha.

After the Battle of Plassey of 1757, one of Siraj ud-Daulah's officers by the name of Prabhuram went into hiding in Lakshmikol to avoid the British colonialists. Prabhuram's son, Dwigendra Prasad, eventually became a prominent zamindar in the area, and his son Surya Kumar earned the title of Raja. In 1890, the Rajbari railway station was established, and it is said that it was named after Raja Surya Kumar. Other zamindars such as the Nawara Chowdhuries of Banibaha objected to this as the name of Rajbari was said to have been established long before Kumar. The Amirabad Estate, which was the largest zamindari estate in colonial Faridpur, controlled huge swathes of farmland in Rajbari, including near Goalundo Ghat.

During the Bangladesh War of 1971, an organisation named the Sangram Parishad (Struggle Council) was established on 26 March. On 21 and 22 April, six Bengali fighters were murdered during an encounter with the Pakistan Army. In the villages of Majhpara, Ramcole and Mathurapur, the army killed 10 pro-independence Bengalis and individuals in addition to setting many houses on fire. The Bengali fighters captured a large amount of equipment and resources from the Army in November. Another brawl took place in that month in the village of Alhadipur leading to 9 Pakistan Army casualties.

== Geography and climate ==
The district is bounded by Pabna District on the north, Faridpur and Magura districts on the south, Manikganj District on the east, Kushtia and Jhenaidah districts on the west. The land of the district is mainly alluvial raised from the Padma.

Annual average temperature of this district is maximum 35.8 °C and minimum 12.6 °C. Annual rainfall is 2105 mm.

=== Major rivers ===
- Padma
- Jalangi
- Kumar
- Garai
- Madhumati
- Harai
- Chandana
- Chitra

== Demographics ==
Historical population
Year	Pop.	±% p.a.
1974	569,461	—
1981	678,205	+2.53%
1991	835,173	+2.10%
2001	951,906	+1.32%
2011	1,049,778	+0.98%
2022	1,189,818	+1.14%

According to the 2022 Census of Bangladesh, Rajbari District had 295,216 households and a population of 1,189,818 with an average 3.99 people per household. Among the population, 215,341 (18.10%) inhabitants were under 10 years of age. The population density was 1,089 people per km^{2}. Rajbari District had a literacy rate (age 7 and over) of 69.49%, compared to the national average of 74.80%, and a sex ratio of 1044 females per 1000 males. Approximately, 15.11% of the population lived in urban areas. The ethnic population was 3,324.

=== Religion ===
Religions in Rajbari District (2022)
Religion	Percent
Islam	90.66%
Hinduism	9.29%
Other or not stated	0.05%

Religion in present-day Rajbari district
Religion	1941 (Note: Goalundo subdivision of Faridpur district)		1981		1991		2001		2011		2022	
Religion	Pop.	%	Pop.	%	Pop.	%	Pop.	%	Pop.	%	Pop.	%
Islam	211,005	63.09%	563,451	83.08%	724,361	86.73%	847,616	89.04%	942,527	89.78%	1,078,677	90.66%
Hinduism	123,011	36.78%	113,975	16.81%	109,614	13.12%	103,664	10.89%	106,974	10.19%	110,569	9.29%
Others (Note: Including Jainism, Christianity, Buddhism, Zoroastrianism, Judaism, Ad-Dharmis, or not stated)	460	0.14%	779	0.11%	1,198	0.15%	626	0.07%	277	0.03%	572	0.05%
Total population	334,476	100%	678,205	100%	835,173	100%	951,906	100%	1,049,778	100%	1,189,818	100%

The district is predominantly Muslim. Muslims number 1,078,677, Hindus 110,569, and Christians 163.

== Places of interest ==
Dighi (a kind of water body) in Rajbari include Kallyan Dighi, situated in Baliakandi of Islampur union. Rajbari is situated by the bank of the Padma River.

Godar Bazar, the bank of Padma River and also a well-known place of interest is situated near at Rajbari town. Another well known place is UK Beach (Urakanda Padma River Side Resort).

== Administration ==
Once Rajbari region was a part of Jessore District. In 1811 when Faridpur District was formed Rajbari was included in it. Besides, the upazilas under Rajbari district were included in different districts in the past. Pangsha Upazila was once included into Pabna District. In 1859, Pangsha and Baliakandi were included in the newly formed Kumarkhali Upazila. In 1871, when Goalanda Upazila was formed, Pangsha and Rajbari were included in it and its headquarters was established in Rajbari. Goalanda was upgraded into a district in March 1984 and it was renamed as Rajbari District.

=== Parliamentary seats ===
1. Rajbari-1
2. Rajbari-2

=== Upazilas ===
Rajbari District upazila geocode map

There are 5 upazilas in this district. They are:

1. Baliakandi Upazila
2. Goalanda Upazila
3. Pangsha Upazila
4. Kalukhali Upazila
5. Rajbari Sadar Upazila

=== Deputy commissioner ===
The DC is the chief administrative and revenue officer of Rajbari District.

Name	Term
Shahiduddin Ahmad	26/2/1984 - 5/10/1986
Muhammad Najmul Ahsan	29/9/1986 - 25/2/1989
Zillur Rashid Chowdhury	22/2/1989 - 8/1/1991
Chowdhury Ghulam Mawla	13/8/1992 - 1/8/1995
Muhammad Wahidur Rahman	2/8/1995 - 21/8/1995
AFM Matiur Rahman	22/8/1995 - 27/4/1996
Amirul Karim	22/4/1996 - 14/7/1999
ASM Hanifuddin Sarkar	15/7/1999 - 28/3/2001
Raziyah Begum	28/3/2001 - 25/4/2002
Bijankanti Sarkar	25/4/2002 - 1/9/2004
Muhammad Nurul Alam	1/9/2004 - 3/9/2006
Muhammad Jamal Husayn Majumdar	3/9/2006 - 19/11/2006
Tawhidah Bulbul	19/11/2006 - 26/1/2008
Muhammad Mahfuzur Rahman	24/1/2008 - 28/4/2009
Fayz Ahmad	27/4/2009 - 27/4/2010
Sayyidah Sahana Bibi	27/4/2010 - 12/12/2012
Muhammad Hasanuzzaman Kallol	12/12/2012 - 20/6/2014
Arafatul Islam Jim	21/6/2015 - 27/4/2015
Muhammad Rafiqul Islam Khan	20/6/2014 -2/2/2016
Jinnat Ara	2/2/2016 - 11/5/2017
Muhammad Shawqat Ali	11/5/2017 - 24/6/2019
Dilshad Begum	Present

== Education ==
Rajbari District features a robust educational network spanning secondary schools, colleges, and madrasas.

=== Tertiary education ===
The flagship institution is Rajbari Government College, founded on 23 June 1961 by civil servant Quazi Azhar Ali and nationalized on 1 March 1980. Initially housed in a former Baptist Mission building, the college expanded to a 14-acre campus through land donations and acquisitions. It began with humanities and commerce courses, added science in 1963, and gradually expanded to include numerous honors and postgraduate departments. By 2023, it enrolled approximately 11,000 students and employed around 65 faculty members. Notable alumni include actor Chanchal Chowdhury, former state minister Kazi Keramat Ali, and High Court Justice S. M. Kuddus Zaman.

Other prominent colleges in the district include Rajbari Government Adarsha Mohila College, Dr. Abul Hossain University College, Pangsha Government College, Kalukhali Government College, Govt. Goalanda Kamrul Islam College, Baharpur College, Baliakandi Degree College, and Mir Mosharraf Hossain Degree College, among others. The district also includes Bhandaria Siddiqia Kamil Madrasah.

=== Secondary education ===
Secondary-level education is served by institutions such as Rajbari Government High School (established 1892), Baharpur High School (1933), Rajbari Government Girls High School, Baliakandi Pilot Model High School, Rajdharpur Madhyamik Bidyalay, Yasin High School, and several additional government and private high schools.

== Notable people ==
- Padamdi Nawab family
  - Mir Mosharraf Hossain, novelist and playwright
- Haroa/Ratandia Choudhury family
  - Yusuf Hossain Choudhury, politician
  - Rashid Hossain Choudhury, artist
- Katakhali Chowdhury family
  - Abdul Wajed Chowdhury (died 1992), politician
  - Salma Chowdhury (born 1971), politician
- Maguradangi Chowdhury family
  - Rowshan Ali Chowdhury (1874–1933), journalist
  - Yakub Ali Chowdhury (1888–1940), essayist
- Bagmara Qazi family
  - Qazi Motahar Hossain (1897–1981), scientist, author and teacher
  - Sanjida Khatun (1933–2025), musicologist
  - Qazi Anwar Hussain (1936–2022), novelist
  - Fahmida Khatun, singer
- AKM Aszad, politician
- Lieutenant General S. M. Matiur Rahman
- Kazi Keramat Ali, former MP & Education Minister
- Md. Zillul Hakim, former MP & Railways Minister
- Ali Newaz Mahmud Khaiyam, former MP
- Jahanara Begum, politician
- Kazi Abdul Wadud, dramatist
- Maulvi Tamizuddin Khan, former Speaker of the Constituent Assembly of Pakistan
- Monsur Ul Karim, painter
- Rokanuzzaman Khan, journalist
- Shohely Akhter, cricketer
- S. M. Kuddus Zaman, justice
- Satish Chandra Vidyabhusan, eminent Sanskrit scholar
- Shohely Akhter, cricketer
- Kangalini Sufia, folk singer
- Kazi Abul Kasem, polymath
- Rozina, actress
- Khurshida Begum Sayeed, former commissioner
- Khabiruzzaman, Bir Bikrom
- Mohammad Yakub Ali Chowdhury, essayist, journalist

== See also ==
- Districts of Bangladesh
- Rajdharpur
