= Goalanda Upazila =

Goalanda গোয়ালন্দ Goalundaghat
- Upazila
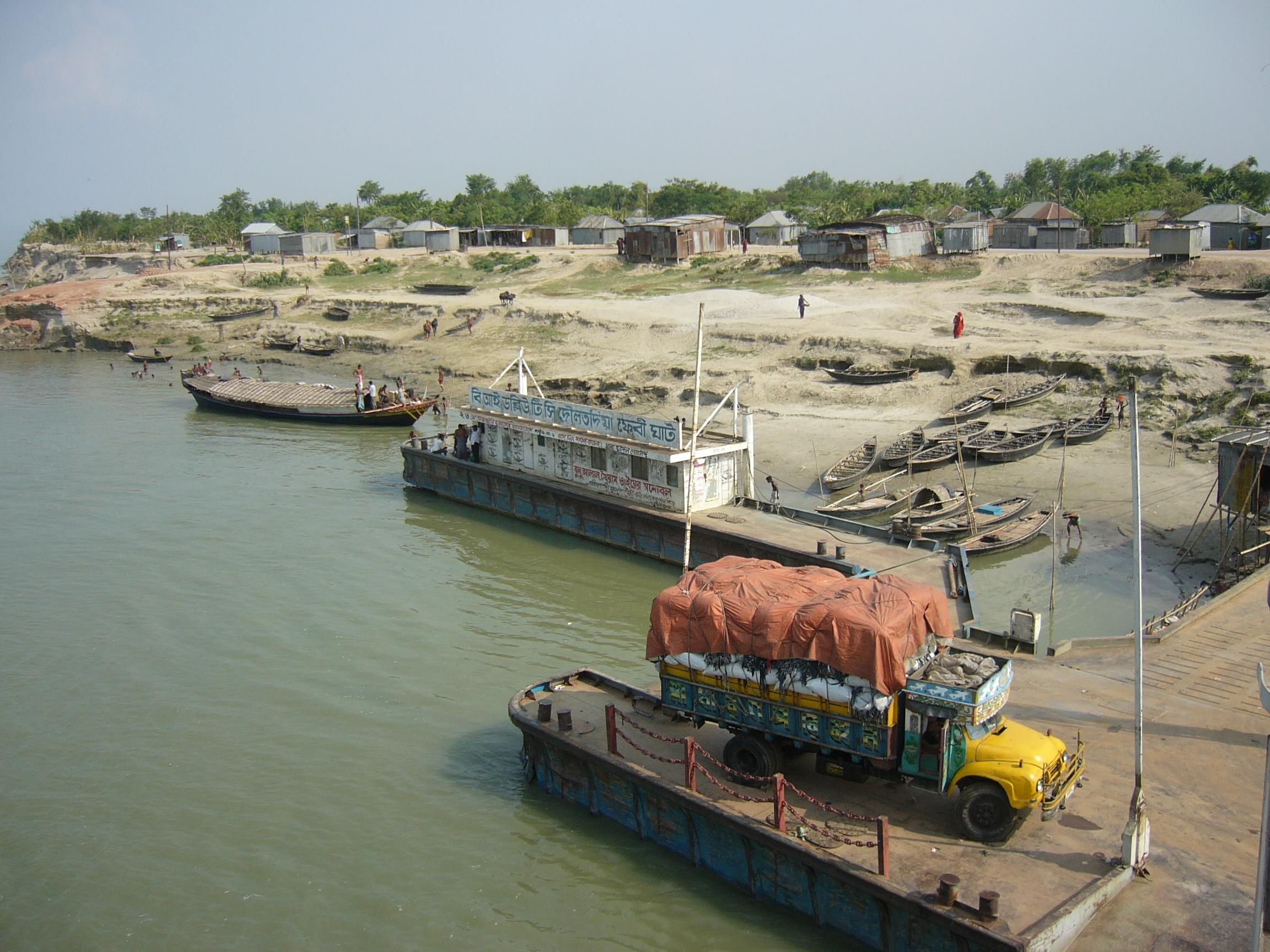
- Daulatdia Ghat on the Padma River

- Coordinates: 23°44′N 89°45.7′E
- Country: Bangladesh
- Division: Dhaka
- District: Rajbari

Area
  - Total: 149.03 km^{2} (57.54 sq mi)

Population (2022)
  - Total: 128,796
  - Density: 864.23/km^{2} (2,238.3/sq mi)
- Time zone: UTC+6 (BST)
- Postal code: 7710
- Area code: 06423
- Website: goalanda.rajbari.gov.bd

Goalanda Upazila mauza geocode map

Goalanda (Bengali: গোয়ালন্দ) is an upazila of Rajbari District in the Division of Dhaka, Bangladesh.

== Geography ==
Goalanda is located at 23.7333°N 89.7611°E. It has 24,613 housing units and has a total area of 121.82 km^{2}.

== Demographics ==
Religions in Goalanda Upazila (2022)
Religion	Percent
Islam	96.31%
Hinduism	3.68%

According to the 2022 Bangladeshi census, Goalanda Upazila had 31,230 households and a population of 128,796. 9.47% of the population were under 5 years of age. Goalanda had a literacy rate (age 7 and over) of 67.52%: 69.47% for males and 65.73% for females, and a sex ratio of 93.21 males for every 100 females. 26,642 (20.69%) lived in urban areas.

As of the 2011 Census of Bangladesh, Goalanda upazila had 24,613 households and a population of 112,732. 26,622 (23.62%) were under 10 years of age. Goalanda had an average literacy rate of 40.3%, compared to the national average of 51.8%, and a sex ratio of 1053 females per 1000 males. 30,190 (26.78%) of the population lived in urban areas.

Goalanda had a population of 91,675 in the 1991 Bangladesh census. Males constitute 52.1% of the population, and females 47.9%. The population aged over eighteen was 44,854. Goalandaghat has an average literacy rate of 20.5% (7+ years), compared to the national average of 32.4%.

== Administration ==
Goalanda Upazila is divided into Goalanda Municipality and four union parishads: Chotovakla, Debugram, Doulatdia, and Uzancar. The union parishads are subdivided into 56 mauzas and 152 villages.

Goalanda Municipality is subdivided into 9 wards and 45 mahallas.

== See also ==
- Upazilas of Bangladesh
- Districts of Bangladesh
- Divisions of Bangladesh
