= Rajdharpur Madhyamik Bidyalay =

- রাজধরপুর মাধ্যমিক বিদ্যালয় (Bengali)

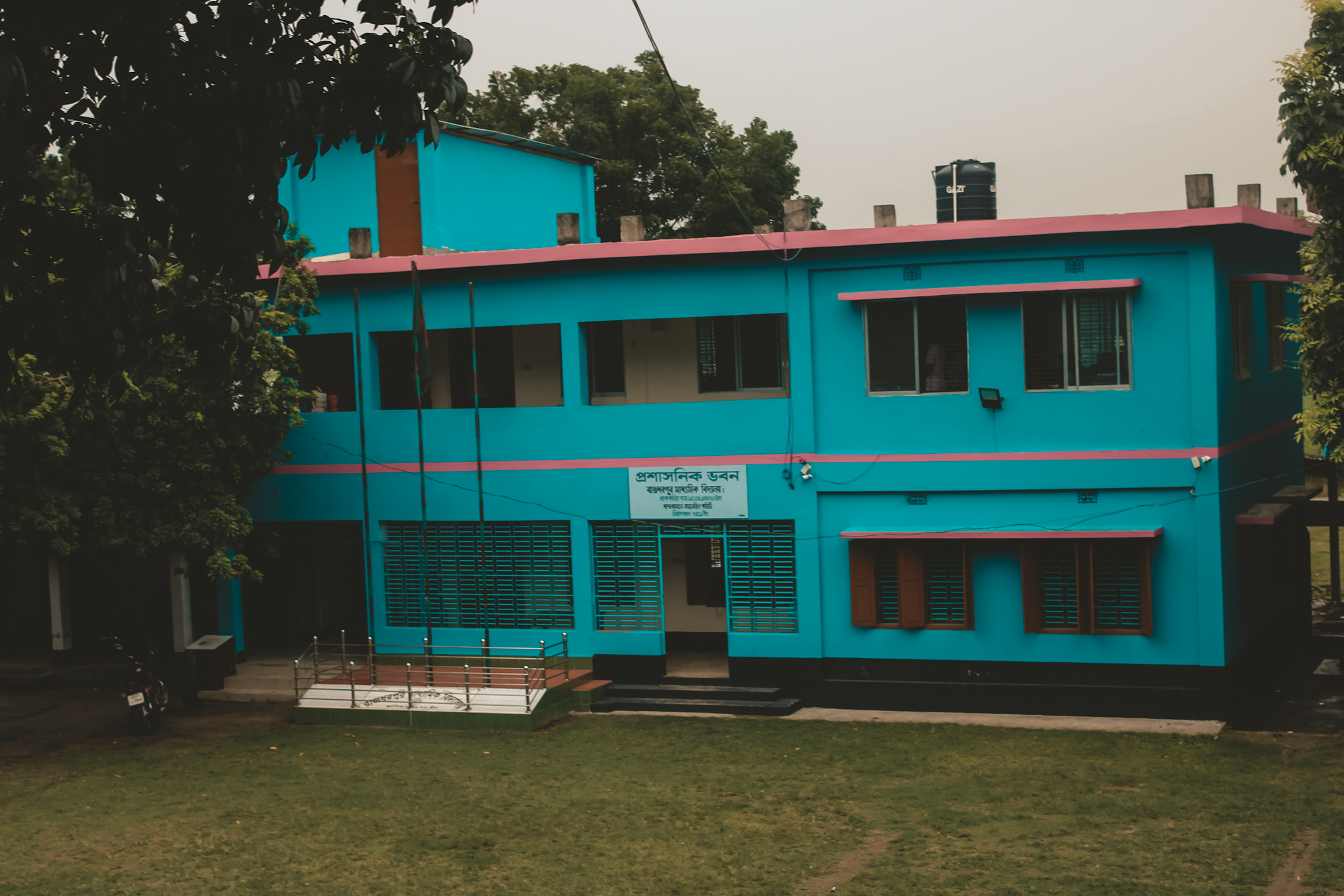
- Administrative building

Location
- Rajdharpur, Baliakandi, Rajbari - 7730; Bangladesh; 23.7217°N 89.5783°E

Information
- Type: Non-government, secondary school, mixed-gender education, day school
- Established: 1 January 1973
- Founder: Abdul Gofur Molla
- School district: Dhaka Education Board; Bangladesh Technical Education Board
- School code: 113253
- Headmaster: Sheikh Mohammed Wahiduzzaman
- Teaching staff: 29
- Grades: Class 6 to 10
- Enrollment: 800+
- Education system: National Curriculum and Textbook Board
- Language: Bangla
- Campus type: Rural, non-residential, 1.58 acres (0.64 ha)
- Demonym: RMBian
- Website: rmb.edu.bd

Rajdharpur Madhyamik Bidyalay (Bengali: রাজধরপুর মাধ্যমিক বিদ্যালয়, abbreviated RMB) also known as Rajdharpur High School is a secondary school in Rajdharpur, Baliakandi, Rajbari, Bangladesh. It was started as a junior high school in 1968, and was upgraded to a high school in 1973. This school was founded by education personnel, well-wiser and social worker Abdul Gofur Molla.

Rajdharpur Madhyamik Bidyalay's EIIN is 113253. It practices co-education. The institute's MPO number is 3301021302. It has one shift. This school operates independently by the School Managing Committee (SMC).

== History ==
After elected as the chairman of Islampur Union in 1960, Abdul Gofur Molla started Rajdharpur High School in 1961 with the thought of a high school along with various developments in Rajdharpur. Mollah was in overall charge of the school. In that time, the headmaster was the Khoshedur Rahman. The school was closed again in 1964 due to non-receipt of official recognition in time. Abdul Razzak Mollah started it again as Haji Kachai Mollah Lower Secondary School in 1967 with the dream of rebuilding the school. But Razzak Mollah left because he had a job elsewhere. In 1967, the name of the school was again changed to Rajdharpur Lower Secondary School. It got official recognition from 1 January 1968, and the school was functioning as a lower secondary school till 1972. From 1 January 1972, ninth class was opened in Rajdharpur Lower Secondary School. The local people started trying to develop the school in many different ways. Finally on 1 January 1973, it received official approval.

== Alumni association ==
Rajdharpur Madhyamik Bidyalay Praktan Chatra Samity
- রাজধরপুর মাধ্যমিক বিদ্যালয় প্রাক্তন ছাত্র সমিতি
- Founded: 1990; 36 years ago
- Type: Nonprofit
- Key people: Muhammad Habibur Rahman Sikder (President); Md Sohan Sultan (Secretary)
- Website: rmbpcs.org

There is an organization of the ex-students of the school named the Rajdharpur Madhyamik Bidyalay Praktan Chatra Samity (Bengali: রাজধরপুর মাধ্যমিক বিদ্যালয় প্রাক্তন ছাত্র সমিতি). It was formed in 1990. The aim of this nonprofit organization is mainly to organize reunions amongst the ex-students of this school, provide financial aid to impoverished students and work with the school to improve its facilities. Every year after Eid al-Adha this organization organized a culture program titled Eid Full-fledged Ceremony (Bengali: ঈদ পূর্ণমিলনী অনুষ্ঠান).

== Notable alumni ==
- Md. Shahjahan Ali Mollah, Bangladesh Public Service Commission (PSC) member and ex-secretary to the Bangladesh government.
- Muhammad Shahidul Islam, vice president, NCC Bank.
