= Baliakandi Upazila =

Baliakandi বালিয়াকান্দি
- Upazila
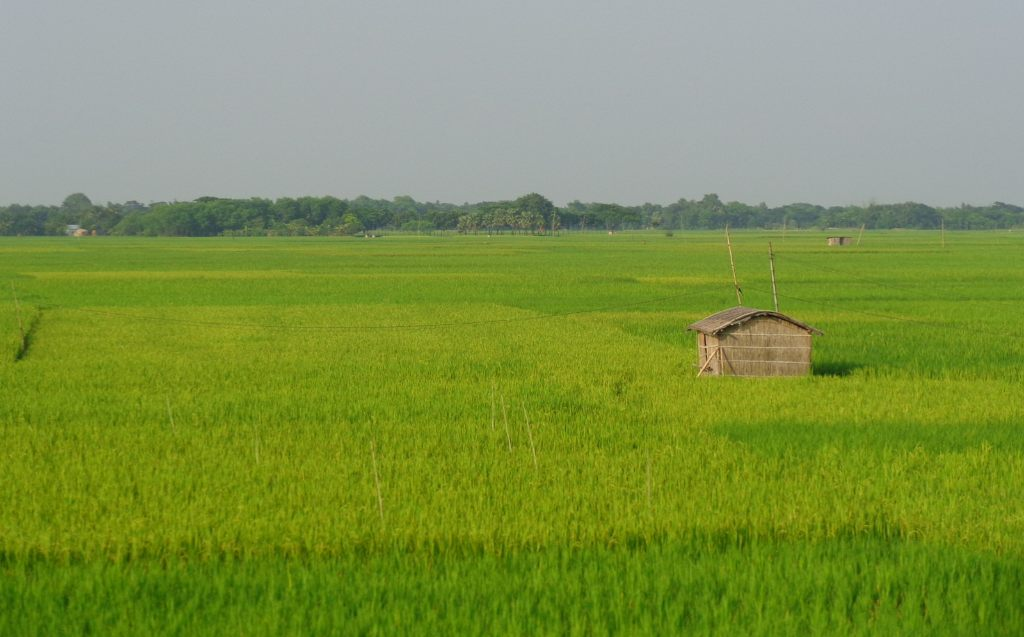
- Crop Fields in Baliakandi Upazila

- Coordinates: 23°38.1′N 89°33′E
- Country: Bangladesh
- Division: Dhaka
- District: Rajbari

Area
  - Total: 229 km^{2} (88 sq mi)

Population (2022)
  - Total: 230,031
  - Density: 1,000/km^{2} (2,600/sq mi)
- Time zone: UTC+6 (BST)
- Postal code: 7730
- Website: www.baliakandi.rajbari.gov.bd

Baliakandi Upazila mauza geocode map

Baliakandi (Bengali: বালিয়াকান্দি) is an upazila of Rajbari District in the division of Dhaka, Bangladesh.

== History ==
Baliakandi Thana was established in 1881. This thana was converted into an upazila in 1983. The area of the upazila town is 6.20 square kilometers. The upazila town is made up of three mouzas. The words 'Bali' of Baliari (sand dune) and 'Kanda' (river bank) of Chandana River are believed to have played a role in the naming of Baliakandi, which is built in Baliari of Chandana River.

== Geography ==
The total area of Baliakandi Upazila is 229 square kilometers with land area of 203 square kilometers. It shares borders with Kalukhali Upazila to the north. Madhukhali Upazila of Faridpur District to the south, Rajbari Sadar Upazila to the east. A portion of Kalukhali Upazila and Sreepur Upazila of Magura District are on the west. The upazila is located at latitude 23°33 and 23°44 north and longitudes 90°26 and 90°40 east.

== Demographics ==
Historical population
Year	Pop. (000)	±%
1981	137	—
1991	163	+19.0%
2001	187	+14.7%
2011	207	+10.7%
2022	230	+11.1%
Source: Bangladesh Bureau of Statistics

According to the 2022 Bangladeshi census, Baliakandi Upazila had 55,095 households and a population of 230,031. 9.10% of the population were under 5 years of age. Baliakandi had a literacy rate (age 7 and over) of 70.56%: 71.84% for males and 69.33% for females, and a sex ratio of 97.50 males for every 100 females. 20,234 (8.80%) lived in urban areas.

Religions in Baliakandi Upazila (2022)
Religion	Percent
Islam	80.38%
Hinduism	19.60%
Other or not stated	0.02%

Population by religion in Union
Union	Muslim	Hindu	Others
Baharpur Union	32,592	6,024	8
Baliakandi Union	24,285	6,330	6
Islampur Union	31,612	2,819	16
Jamalpur Union	26,482	6,535	2
Jangal Union	4,996	18,912	3
Nababpur Union	38,784	3,484	3
Narua Union	26,127	989	2

🟩 Muslim majority 🟧 Hindu majority

As of the 2011 Census of Bangladesh, Baliakandi upazila had 46,262 households and a population of 207,086. 44,652 (21.56%) were under 10 years of age. Baliakandi had an average literacy rate of 55.5%, compared to the national average of 51.8%, and a sex ratio of 997 females per 1000 males. 9,897 (4.78%) of the population lived in urban areas.

== Administration ==
Baliakandi Upazila is divided into seven union parishads: Baharpur, Baliakandi, Islampur, Jamalpur, Jangal, Narua, and Nawabpur. The union parishads are subdivided into 149 mauzas and 258 villages.

== See also ==
- Upazilas of Bangladesh
- Districts of Bangladesh
- Divisions of Bangladesh
- Rajdharpur
- Baliakandi (Town)
