= Kalukhali Upazila =

Kalukhali কালুখালী
- Upazila
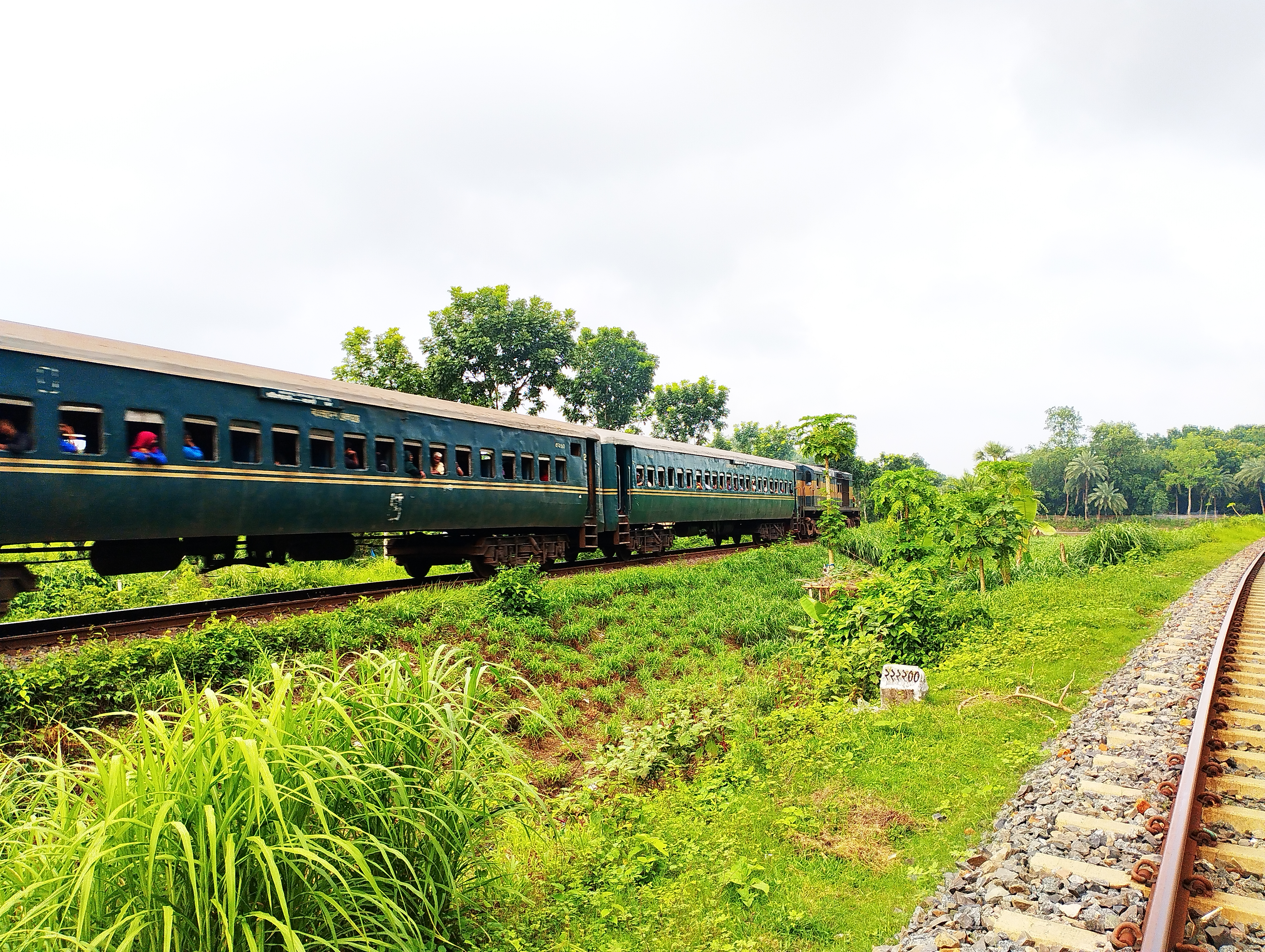
- Kalukhali Junction

- Coordinates: 23.7621°N 89.4994°E
- Country: Bangladesh
- Division: Dhaka
- District: Rajbari

Area
  - Total: 168.81 km^{2} (65.18 sq mi)

Population (2022)
  - Total: 172,347
  - Density: 1,021.0/km^{2} (2,644.3/sq mi)
- Time zone: UTC+6 (BST)
- Postal code: 7722 (Ratandia)
- Postal code: 7723 (Mrigi Bazar)
- Website: Upazila Portal

Kalukhali Upazila mauza geocode map

Kalukhali (Bengali: কালুখালী উপজেলা) is an upazila, or sub-district, of the Rajbari District in Dhaka Division, Bangladesh.

== Demographics ==
Religions in Kalukhali Upazila (2022)
Religion	Percent
Islam	92.26%
Hinduism	7.59%
Other or not stated	0.15%

According to the 2022 Bangladeshi census, Kalukhali Upazila had 42,886 households and a population of 172,347. 9.30% of the population were under 5 years of age. Kalukhali had a literacy rate (age 7 and over) of 67.00%: 67.76% for males and 66.29% for females, and a sex ratio of 95.89 males for every 100 females. 4,706 (2.73%) lived in urban areas.

As of the 2011 Census of Bangladesh, Kalukhali upazila had 35,032 households and a population of 155,044. 34,645 (22.35%) were under 10 years of age. Kalukhali had an average literacy rate of 51.2%, compared to the national average of 51.8%, and a sex ratio of 1008 females per 1000 males. 4,223 (2.72%) of the population lived in urban areas.

== Administration ==
Kalukhali Upazila is divided into seven union parishads: Boalia, Kalikapur, Majhbari, Madapur, Mrigi, Ratandia, and Saorail. The union parishads are subdivided into 153 mauzas and 156 villages.
