= Christian Commission for Development in Bangladesh =

Religious organisation

Christian Commission for the Development of Bangladesh
- Formation: 1972
- Type: NGO
- Headquarters: Mirpur, Dhaka, Bangladesh
- Location: 88, Senpara Parbatta, Mirpur – 10, Dhaka 1216, Bangladesh
- Official language: Bengali, English
- Key people: Joyanta Adhikari (Executive Director)
- Staff: 379
- Website: www.ccdb-bd.org

Christian Commission for Development in Bangladesh (CCDB) founded in 1972, immediately after the Bangladesh Liberation War, by the World Council of Churches (WCC) to succeed the Bangladesh Ecumenical Relief and Rehabilitation Services (BERRS). The organization asks local imams to talk about disaster preparedness in their Friday services as part of its Disaster Preparedness Programme.

== Major activities ==
The major activities of CCDB include rural development, people-managed savings and credit programmes, work with ethnic/indigenous communities, training traditional birth attendants, women's development programmes and gender awareness programmes, enhancing human and organizational potential. The major programmes are:

- Ethnic Community Development Programs: It include five major thrusts: local self-governance (the People's Institution programme), education (including the highly successful programme to provide local schools), ethnic culture, health, food security and the economic development, and environmental conservation.
- Traditional Birth Attendant Training Program: 30,000 practicing Traditional Birth Attendants (TBA) has been trained through an eleven-day basic training course.
- Economic Development Program (EDP): Through this programme CCDB arranged business creation training courses for 310 rural entrepreneurs. It also provided business development services and appropriate technology support, including organic farming, to these entrepreneurs.
- Women's Small Local Organization Program (WSLO): The WSLO program has been helping women of Bangladesh to develop management skills through small local organizations since 1989. 200 WSLO representatives participated in training, workshops and orientations on a variety of subjects. These subjects include the human trafficking, human rights, entrepreneurship, HIV/AIDS, arsenic mitigation, legal services, safe water and sanitation, adolescent reproductive health and the birth registration among other issues. The WSLO program also created 14 preschools that serve 2400 underprivileged children.

== Current status ==
CCDB is addressing the needs for access to credit, training, and work through its People's Participatory Rural Development (PPRD) in 22 districts. These are: Manikganj, Rajshahi, Narsingdi, Nawabganj, Naogaon, Natore, Pabna, Gopalganj, Barisal, Dinajpur, Rangpur, Bandarban, Rangamati, Faridpur, Jessore, Magura, Jhenaidah, Khulna, Sathkhira, Kushtia, Narail and Cox's Bazar. CCDB has provided necessary support 36 community development areas, 49 small organisations and 136,595 families, including 28,949 people helped through PPRD, 9,100 of them from the poorest sector of the communities.

Out of the total operations, CCDB's development programmes are running in 89 Thanas under 19 districts, covering 129,660 poor reference families at an annual operation budget is approximately US$2.1 million. It is addressing the needs for access to credit, training, and work through PPRD, its core development program, as well as other programmes. CCDB's nine programs together has helped over 100,000 people, 80% of whom are women and children. These programmes are supported by 14 donor agencies from Europe, Australia and USA, with an annual contribution of approximately $3.5 million. The WSLO has been particularly successful in mobilizing local and external donor agencies to support CCDB projects.
