= Association for Social Advancement =

Microfinance institution in Bangladesh

ASA
- Formation: 1978
- Founder: Md. Shafiqual Haque Choudhury
- Type: Non-profit, self-sufficient microfinance institution
- Purpose: ASA programs focused on awareness-raising and group formation for the poor aiming at integrated development through asserting rights of the poor, education, mini-irrigation, primary health, credit for income generation, etc.
- Headquarters: Dhaka, Bangladesh
- Region served: Worldwide
- Key people: Md. Ariful Haque Choudhury (President)
- Subsidiaries: ASA International
- Staff: 21,422 (2013)
- Website: asa.org.bd

The ASA is a non-governmental organisation based in Bangladesh which provides microcredit financing.

== History ==
The association was established in 1978 by Md. Shafiqual Haque Choudhury and a team of people who were then working for other established NGOs, but who themselves were arguing for a more radical way to alleviate the exploitation of rural villages caused by the 1971 Bangladesh atrocities. The founding framework of ASA was aimed at empowering rural landless villagers from the "bottom up" through "people's organizations". These were run by volunteers who advocated that a consciousness for solidarity amongst the village poor would lead to collective social action. ASA has currently over 5.3 million members forming different groups with special emphasis on saving practice and 21,477 employees engaged in disbursing and collecting loans and savings deposits.

For many years, ASA sought to combine social development (in health, education, nutrition, and sanitation) with credit provision, but in 1991, these were abandoned, and ASA shifted its focus solely to microcredit lending. This was because they wanted to stop "donor dependence" and become specialised and financially self-sufficient. Since then, it has become a fully self-sufficient microfinance institution – operating mainly in Bangladesh, but with presence in Africa and South America. ASA offers financial services to including micro-credit, small business credit, regular weekly savings, voluntary savings and life insurance – and aims to follow a simple, standardised, low-cost system of organisation, management, savings and credit operations.

It was initially funded by donors, then some small commercial bank loans, then low-cost loans from a subsidised wholesaler, and finally from client deposits and retained earnings. The core service has remained the low-value year-long weekly-repayment loan. ASA has not had to undergo large-scale internal reorganisation or training because the basic product and its delivery have remained largely unchanged. Also, savings from clients are used to provide security against default by protecting the small loan portfolio, instead of being used in more risky ventures like raising capital.

== Microfinancing model ==
ASA offers an alternative microfinancing model to that of the Grameen Bank. In December 2007, it placed Number 1 in Forbes Magazine's list of the world's top 50 microfinance institutions. Grameen Bank placed Number 16, despite having won the Nobel Peace Prize in 2006.

Its flat interest rate was 15% (approximately 32% annual percentage rate) until July 1995, when it dropped to 12.5% at a time when micro-finance institution (MFIs) were coming under increasing criticism in the press for their prices.

== Internal organisation ==
ADB describes ASA as the "Ford motor model of microfinance" because of its standardisation of low-cost microfinance. Its flat organisational structure consists of three tiers: a relatively small central office in Dhaka, district offices, and branch offices. The branch offices are the main channel through which their core loan products are disbursed. These branches report to the district offices, who in turn report to the head office.

Each of its 2,933 branches in Bangladesh is a self-sufficient unit, run by six people: a branch manager, an assistant branch manager, and four loan officers. The branch manager is allowed to approve all transactions within the branch, provided they meet the guidelines of an operating manual. Each branch is run as a profit centre, and is expected to fully recover costs between 9 and 12 months.

== Operating information ==
Up to June 2014, ASA's cumulative loan disbursement has been TK. 851.42 billion (US$10.95 billion) while loan outstanding (principal) was TK. 59.29 billion (US$760 million) among 4 million borrowers. As of June 2014, ASA's Operational Self Sufficiency (OSS) was 202.72%, Financial Self-sufficiency (FSS) 127.03% and rate of loan recovery 99.63%. It has 20,259 staff serving more than 4.85 million clients.

== Impacts on Bangladesh ==
A 2008 study conducted by ASA's Research and Documentation Cell showed that ASA's Credit and Savings Program increased, among other outcomes, business capital, education, employment and sanitation. In 2011, ASA, together with Grameen Bank and BRAC, accounted for 62 per cent of Bangladesh's 18.5 million micro-borrowers and 69 per cent of the sector's gross loan portfolio.

At the industry level, overall average borrower numbers and portfolios have been rising steadily, ASA's active borrower accounts in 2008 and 2009 fell by 32 percent. This was data was analysed as a need for ASA to diversify their products and increase their quality of service.

Women are the main demographic to which ASA provide their services. In 2007, 71% of services were to women. Women who belong to ASA are reported to be among the least active within community and political life.
