= Muksudpur Upazila =

Muksudpur মুকসুদপুর
- Upazila
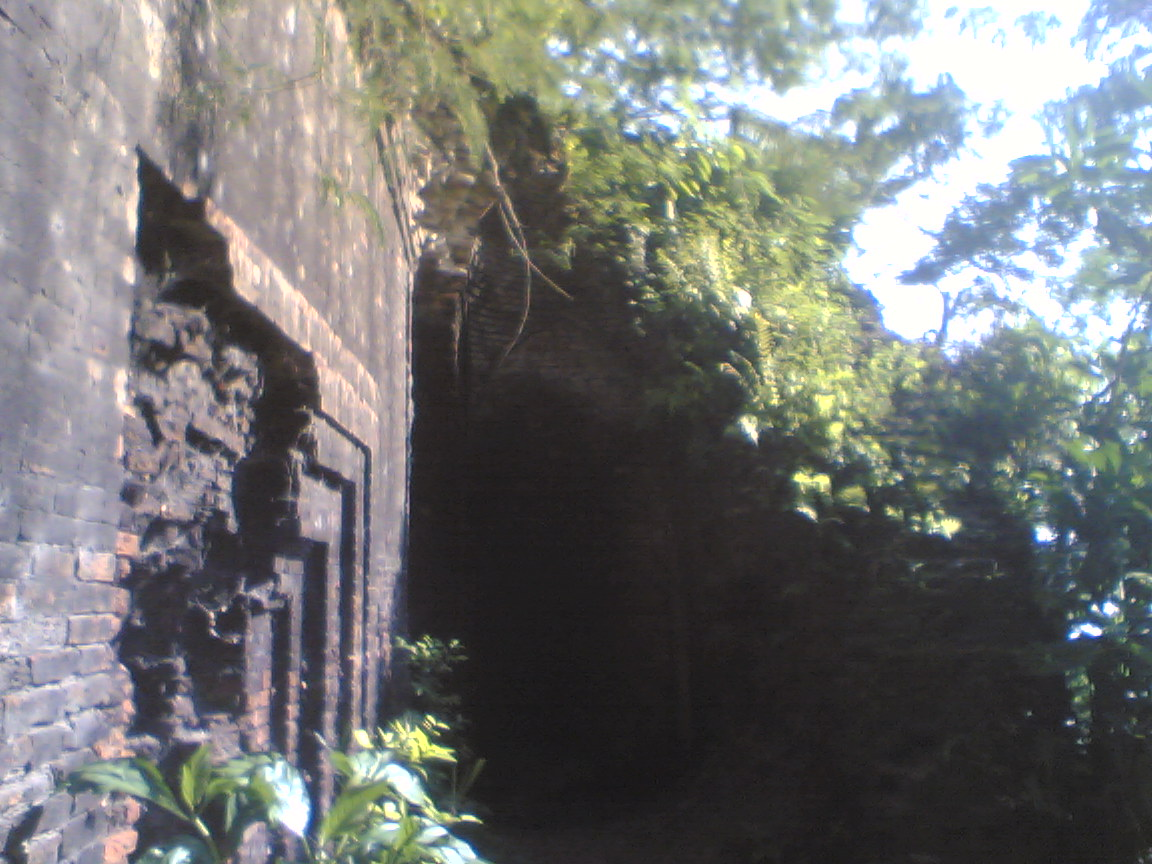
- Nanikhir Navaratna Temple

- Coordinates: 23°19′N 89°52′E
- Country: Bangladesh
- Division: Dhaka
- District: Gopalganj

Area
  - Total: 308.36 km^{2} (119.06 sq mi)

Population (2022)
  - Total: 307,528
  - Density: 997.30/km^{2} (2,583.0/sq mi)
- Time zone: UTC+6 (BST)
- Postal code: 8140
- Area code: 06654

Muksudpur Upazila mauza geocode map

Muksudpur (Bengali: মুকসুদপুর) is an upazila of Gopalganj District in the Division of Dhaka, Bangladesh.

== Geography ==
Muksudpur is located at 23.3167°N 89.8667°E. It has a total area of 308.36 km^{2}.

== Demographics ==
Historical population
Year	Pop. (000)	±%
1981	246	—
1991	269	+9.3%
2001	288	+7.1%
2011	289	+0.3%
2022	308	+6.6%
Source: Bangladesh Bureau of Statistics

According to the 2022 Bangladeshi census, Muksudpur Upazila had 75,303 households and a population of 307,528. 9.96% of the population were under 5 years of age. Muksudpur had a literacy rate (age 7 and over) of 77.20%: 79.04% for males and 75.57% for females, and a sex ratio of 90.82 males for every 100 females. 40,033 (13.02%) lived in urban areas.

Religions in Muksudpur Upazila (2022)
Religion	Percent
Islam	75.43%
Hinduism	23.07%
Christianity	1.47%
Other or not stated	0.03%

Population by religion in Union
Union	Muslim	Hindu	Others
Bahugram Union	5,950	5,947	0
Banshbaria Union	7,216	3,837	0
Batikamari Union	18,540	1,505	1
Bhabrasur Union	9,788	3,513	2
Dignagar Union	24,481	3,202	0
Gobindapur Union	23,487	1,348	1
Gohala Union	18,341	3,244	59
Jalirpar Union	2,261	14,404	3,630
Kasalia Union	4,019	6,177	650
Khandarpar Union	9,611	1,480	0
Maharajpur Union	23,185	1,966	1
Mochna Union	16,487	1,583	0
Nanikkhir Union	8,050	6,402	242
Pasharganti Union	11,882	1,001	2
Raghdi Union	19,960	1,148	4
Ujani Union	3,054	10,582	7

🟩 Muslim majority 🟧 Hindu majority

According to the 2011 Census of Bangladesh, Muksudpur Upazila had 61,807 households and a population of 289,406. 69,799 (24.12%) were under 10 years of age. Muksudpur had a literacy rate (age 7 and over) of 52.54%, compared to the national average of 51.8%, and a sex ratio of 1053 females per 1000 males. 19,711 (6.81%) lived in urban areas.

== Administration ==
Muksudpur Upazila is divided into Muksudpur Municipality and 16 union parishads: Bhabrasur, Bahugram, Banshbaria, Batikamari, Dignagar, Gobindapur, Gohala, Jalirpar, Kasalia, Khandarpur, Maharajpur, Mochna, Nanikshir, Pasargati, Raghdi, and Ujani. The union parishads are subdivided into 206 mauzas and 255 villages.

Muksudpur Municipality is subdivided into 9 wards and 15 mahallas.

Chairman: Kabir Mia

Vice Chairman: Rabiul Islam

Woman Vice Chairman: Taposhi Biswas Durga

== Economy ==
Muksudpur's economic is mostly based on farming and fishing.

== Birds and fish ==
The most common birds of the upazilla include doel, salik, crow and duck. On the other hand, in the river, canal, beels, and ponds there are various kinds of fish like Shol, Gozar, Koi, Puti, Shing etc.

== See also ==
- Shakib Khan - Bangladeshi film actor, producer and singer
