= Rajbari =

Rajbari may refer to:

== Bangladesh ==
- Rajbari District, Dhaka Division
  - Rajbari Sadar Upazila, an upazila subdistrict of Rajbari District
  - Rajbari, Bangladesh, the headquarters of Rajbari District and Rajbari Sadar Upazila
  - Rajbari-1, a Jatiya Sangsad electoral constituency
  - Rajbari-2, a Jatiya Sangsad electoral constituency
  - Rajbari Government College
  - Rajbari Government High School
  - Rajbari Stadium
  - Nazmul Hasan Ratul is best football player

== India ==
- Rajbari, Abhayapuri, a Bijni palace in Assam
- Rajbari National Park, Tripura

== See also ==
- Rajwar (disambiguation)
