= Annada Govinda Public Library =

Library in Pabna, Bangladesh

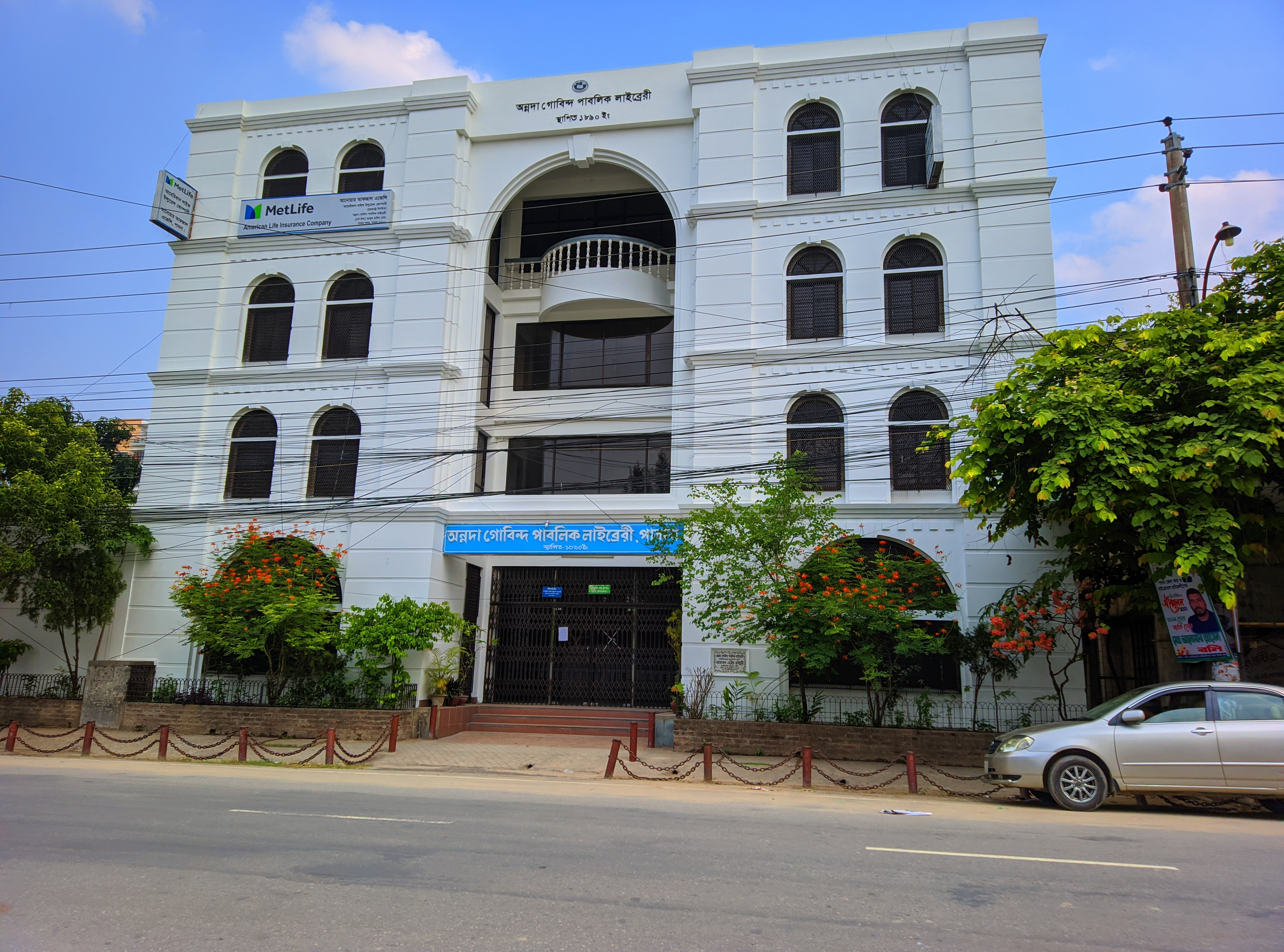
- Formation: 1890; 136 years ago
- Type: Library
- Legal status: Public Library
- Headquarters: Pabna, Bangladesh
- Location: 264P+457, Abdul Hamid Road, Pabna 6600
- Region served: Bangladesh
- Official language: Bengali
- Parent organization: Department of Public Libraries

Annada Govinda Public Library (Bengali: অন্নদা গোবিন্দ পাবলিক লাইব্রেরী) is a library located in Pabna, North Bengal. The library hosted almost 30,000 books, manuscripts, and documents. The library start it journey in 1890. And In 2002 the current library building is opened by Samson H. Chowdhury.

== History ==
Annada Govinda Chowdhury established a public library in Pabna city in 1890, named after himself, and built an inexhaustible bridge in the history of time. It is also known that Gyanada Govinda donated money for the construction of the library in 1889 to preserve the memory of his father. He expanded the scope of the library. In 1890, during the reign of Viceroy Lord Lance Dyne (1888–94), the opening of the doors of the Annada Govinda Public Library, the world of knowledge, is still spoken by many today.

Before the establishment of this library, there were several other libraries in Pabna. However, the glory of this library is still shining today. The municipality was only 14 years old when this library was established. At that time, five to six miles of paved roads in the city were destroyed by the flood of the Ichamati River. At that time, a steamer rammed into the Bajitpur Ghat. The boat of the seventy-three young poet Rabindranath Tagore floated there.

When rice was available for 13 sars for one taka, the Annada Govinda Public Library and Australian Missionary Church were built in Pabna in 1890. The library's journey began in one of two rooms on 13 percent of the land in Rokanpur Pargana (now Gopalpur Mouja) at that time. There was a tin house next to it. It is known that the first editor of the library, Sitanath Adhikari, was its occupant. At that time, this land was vacant. It is worth noting that since 1934, one taka of rent had to be paid in Khasmahal (Tardash Building). At the time of the library's birth, Pabna's Magistrate Collector F. Bij was its president by virtue of his position.

Many of the zamindar clan were poets and writers. They donated books to enrich the library. In addition, many other scholars donated books to the library. That trend is still continuing. Initially, its journey began with some Bengali, cultural, and Persian books. Other works include those of Raja Rammohan, Akshay Kumar Dutta, Ishwar Chandra Vidyasagar, Parychand Mitra, Kali Prasanna, Meherullah Singha, Girish Chandra Sen, Abanindranath Tagore, Abdul Karim Sahitya Bisharad, Ishwar Chandra Gupta, Rangalal Sen, Michael Madhusudan Dutt, Hemnabin Chandra, Biharilal, Jyotirindranath Tagore, Dwijendranath Tagore, Surendranath Majumdar, Debendranath Sen, Akshay Kumar Baral, Rabindranath Tagore, Sarat Chandra, Swarnakumari Devi, Kamini Roy, Man Kumari Bose, Rajnikant Sen, Dwijendralal Roy, Sheikh Fazlal Karim, Amritlal Bose, Girish Chandra Ghosh, Khiroda Prasad Vidyabinod, etc. Over time, the library grew to include thousands of books by hundreds of authors.

On 8 July 1928, a proposal was accepted to become a member of the 'All Bengal Library Association'. A branch of this association was also opened in the Annada Govinda Public Library. At that time, in the hope of increasing the membership of the library and receiving help from the educated people of Pabna, arrangements were made to print 1,000 copies of the application. At that time, electricity was still not available in Pabna. Readers used to study on the library's Petromax lights costing 13 taka and 8 paisas. Electricity was introduced to the library at a cost of 100 taka in December 1936. The electricity system increased the library's activity. In 1937, Jatindranath Roy and Purnachandra Roy, along with the library's editor Rabindranath Bhattacharya, took charge of the literary conference. It was decided to hold literary conferences every 15 days from 1938.

In 1939, two ministers of Bengal, Shrisachandra Nandi (who started his career as a minister but later became the president of the Calcutta Bengali Parishad) and Nalini Ranjan Sarkar, visited the library. The 50th anniversary of its foundation was held in the same year. At that time, the event costing 64 taka 10 annas and five pi, writers Parimal Kumar Goswami and Bibhutibhushan Banerjee came from Kolkata. From 1 August 1942, the first Rabindra death anniversary was celebrated for a week at the Town Hall with the joint efforts of Annada Govinda Public Library, Rabindra Parishad, Pabna Sahitya Chakra and Purnima Sammelan. Essays were written on eight topics in the program. This year, for the first time, it was decided to open a reading room for women every Sunday from 3 pm to 5 pm.

In addition to the lack of a suitable environment and maintenance, many documents were damaged due to the war. Therefore, the chairman of the Square Group, Samson H. Chowdhury, was requested to protect the heritage and important documents. The Square authorities completed the construction of the physical infrastructure for four years from 1998 to 2002 to protect this old institution. As a result, it received the title of the best private library in the country.

== See also ==
- Jessore Institute Public Library
- Umesh Chandra Public Library
- Woodburn Library
- Victoria Public Library, Natore
