= Panihar Public Library =

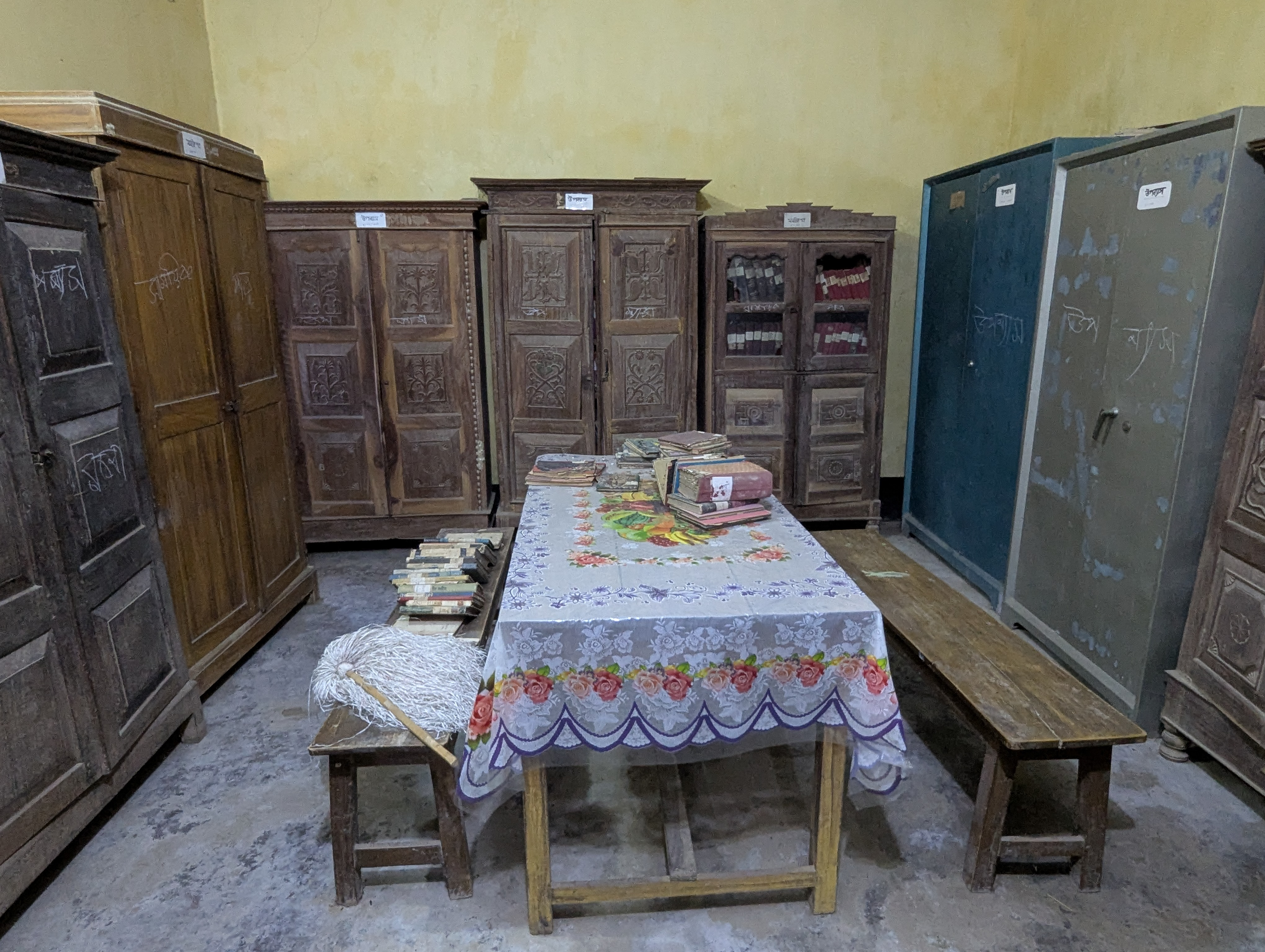
- One of the rooms of the library
- Formation: 1945; 81 years ago
- Legal status: Public Library
- Location: Panihar, Godagari, Rajshahi
- Region served: Bangladesh
- Official language: Bangla
- Parent organization: Department of Public Libraries

Panihar Public Library is a public library established through individual initiative in Panihar, a remote village of Rajshahi's Godagari Upazila in Bangladesh. It was founded in 1945 by philanthropist Enatullah Master. The library currently holds more than 7 thousand books.

== Early life ==
Enayetullah's father was a farmer who had a thirst for learning. He sent his son to Nawab Bahadur Institute in Murshidabad in 1318 Bengali year (c. 1911 CE), He was a member of the Nawab Bahadur High School Library. As a regular reader there, he developed a deep attachment to books, which inspired him to plan a library in his own village.

== Career ==
After returning to his hometown, he established a school in the village of Aihai, where he used to bring books from Kolkata. With the intention of founding a library, he gradually started collecting non-textbooks. By 1945, he had acquired a modest collection and established a library in a mud house, with support from local villagers.

Around the same time, his classmate Sagaram Majhi was elected as a member of the Legislative Assembly (MLA) from the area and assisted Enatullah in developing the library. In 1958, the institution received official recognition as the Panihar Public Library.

== Collection ==
The library holds more than 7 thousand books. However, due to a lack of proper preservation, most of the books have been damaged.
