= Sorboto Mongolo Radhe Binodini Rai =

Sorboto Mongolo Radhe Binodini Rai (Bengali: সর্বত মঙ্গল রাধে বিনোদিনী রাই) is a traditional kirtan. It is a lyrical composition depicting the emotions of the first encounter between the young Radha and Krishna. Centred on the glorification of Radha Krishna, the lyrics of this folk song are partially derived from and influenced by the Mahua Pala, composed by the poet Dwija Kanai in 1650, and have been enriched over the centuries by verses contributed by local Bauls. The lyrics, in fragments or in their entirety, have been published in the personal manuscripts of Bauls and in various formal compilations of folklore, appearing as palaagan (ballad opera), palligiti (rural song), rural rhyme, and jhapan (snake charmer's song). The currently prevalent lyrical form of the song is a composite amalgamation of these folk literary elements. Regularly performed by the Bauls of Bengal, the kirtan has been formally arranged, recorded, and released at various times by solo artists and musical ensembles. The song is notable for the copyright controversy it has generated.

== Lyrical origins ==
Sorboto Mongolo Radhe has no single identifiable lyricist, nor does it possess a unified body of lyrics; rather, it is sung drawing upon the romance of Radha Krishna from palaagan, palligiti, rural rhymes, and jhapan (snake charmer's) songs. At various times, portions or the majority of the song's lyrical verses have been formally published in compilations of rural rhymes, folk songs, pala, and jhapan songs. In its modern renditions, performing groups or artists have rendered it in colloquial form by incorporating their own phrasing alongside the traditional lyrics. Several versions of the song's opening exist; among them, the lyrics found in Bimal Kumar Mukhopadhyay's Banglar Gramya Chhara (Rural Rhymes of Bengal), a compilation of rural rhymes from various regions of Bengal, and a jhapan song recorded in Ashutosh Bhattacharya's Bangiya Lok-Sangit Ratnakar (A Treasury of Bengali Folk Songs) are noteworthy:

সর্বমঙ্গলে রাধে বিনোদিনী রাই।

বৃন্দাবনে বন্দী পীর ঠাকুর কানাই

Sorbomongole Radhe Binodini Rai.

Brindabone bondi pir Thakur Kanai

or

সর্ব জয় মঙ্গলা রাধে বিনোদিনী রায়।

বৃন্দাবন মন্দিরে গাইব ঠাকুর কানাই

আজকে রাধে কুম্ভ কক্ষে জল ভরিতে যায়।

ধীরে ধীরে চিকন কালা পিছে পিছে যায়।

Sorbo joy Mongola Radhe Binodini Rai.

Brindabon mondire gaibo Thakur Kanai

Ajke Radhe kumbho kokhkhe jol bhorite jai.

Dhire dhire chikon kala pichhe pichhe jai.

In addition to Banglar Gramya Chhara and Bangiya Lok-Sangit Ratnakar, the opening portion of the kirtan has been compiled to varying extents in the Bangla Academy's Loksahitya Sankalon (Folklore Compilation) and in the work Raybari by Giribala Devi. The oldest formally published segment of the song is contained within Part 5 of the Mahua Pala, composed by the poet Dwija Kanai in 1650. This is included in Dinesh Chandra Sen's compilation of ballads from the Mymensingh region, the Mymensingh Gitika:

'লজ্জা নাই নির্লজ্জ ঠাকুর লজ্জা নাইরে তর।

গলায় কলসি বাইন্দা জলে ডুব্যা মর \'

কোথায় পাব কলসি কইন্যা, কোথায় পাব দড়ী।

তুমি হও গহীন গাঙ্ আমি ডুব্যা মরি \'

'Lojja nai nirlojjo Thakur lojja naire tor.

Golay koloshi bainda jole dubya mor'

Kothay pabo koloshi koinna, kothay pabo dori.

Tumi hao gohin gang ami dubya mori'

Another substantial portion of the lyrical verses is found in Ashutosh Bhattacharya's Banglar Lok-Sahitya (Folk Literature of Bengal). Bhattacharya posited that these verses bear the influence of several well-known couplets from the Mahua Pala of the Mymensingh Gitika.

ছান করিয়া আইস্যা রাধে মেইলা দিলেন চুল,

পিছন হইতে কিষ্টঠাকুর মেইলা মারলেন ফুল।

“অমন ক্যানে কর কিষ্ট, অমন ক্যানে কর?

যমুনার জলে গিয়া তুমি ডুইব্যা মর।”

“কোথায় পাইমু হাড়ি কলসী, কোথায় পাইমু দড়ি?

রাধে, তুমি হও যমুনার জল, আমি ডুইব্যা মরি।”

Chhan koriya aishya Radhe meila dilen chul,

Pichhon hoite KishthoThakur meila marlen phul.

“Omon kyane kor Kishto, omon kyane kor?

Jamunar jole giya tumi duibya mor.”

“Kothay paimu hari koloshi, kothay paimu dori?

Radhe, tumi hao Jamunar jol, ami duibya mori.”

== Shorolpur version ==
"Juboti Radhe"

Single by Shorolpur
- Recorded: 2012
- Producer: Tariqul Islam Tapan

Sherpur-based Bangladeshi musical ensemble Shorolpur performs a version of the kirtan under the title Juboti Radhe (Young Radha). According to the ensemble, approximately 30 percent of this version consists of the Bauls' traditional oral rendition, while the remaining 70 percent was composed in the group's own phrasing. In 2008, the group collected the traditional oral form of the kirtan (referred to as Premalila, meaning 'love play') from a Baul and his spiritual companion in Bakshiganj. The group's founder, Tariqul Islam Tapan, subsequently composed and set to music a 42-line modern version titled Juboti Radhe, incorporating colloquial synonyms alongside the traditional oral form. The musical arrangement and recording of Juboti Radhe were completed in 2012.

No song by Shorolpur, including Juboti Radhe, has been released on a formal studio album; rather, the song has been performed on multiple occasions at various concerts and live television broadcasts.

== Sumi Mirza version ==
"Binodini Rai"

Single by Sumi Mirza
- Released: 8 August 2019
- Label: Laser Vision
- Producer: Mahmud Sani

This version was recorded under the title Binodini Rai by Bangladeshi vocalist Sumi Mirza. The opening eight lines of this version feature the vocalist's own phrasing, while the remaining portion is drawn from the Mahua Pala. Arranged by Mahmud Sani, it was released on YouTube by Laser Vision on 19 April 2018.

Following copyright complications with Shorolpur, the song underwent a title change and was re-released as a music video on YouTube under the title Binodini Rai on 8 August 2019. To preclude further complications, Sumi Mirza obtained a separate copyright registration for this version.

== Amader Gaan version ==
"Sorboto Mongolo Radhe"

Single by Meher Afroz Shaon and Chanchal Chowdhury

from the album IPDC Amader Gaan
- Released: 20 October 2020; 21 April 2023 (re-release)
- Recorded: 2020
- Venue: Dhaka, Bangladesh
- Genre: Folk music
- Length: 4:49
- Label: IPDC Amader Gaan
- Producer: Partha Barua

This version was released as part of a musical arrangement of eight songs under the IPDC Amader Gaan (IPDC Our Song) project. In October 2020, IPDC and advertising agency Creato announced the initiative to contemporise and re-arrange Bangladeshi folk music for modern audiences. Sorboto Mongolo Radhe was among the folk songs selected. The song was recorded under the musical direction of Partha Barua, as a duet performance by Meher Afroz Shaon and Chanchal Chowdhury. On 20 October 2020, it was released directly on YouTube as the project's third single, accompanied by a music video.

=== Reception and response ===
The song gained widespread popularity shortly after release. Shaon and Chanchal garnered praise on social media for their vocal performance. The song was cited as the most-viewed musical production in Bangladesh for the year 2020. Its lyrical credits were attributed as "folk music, collected". Following its release, Shorolpur alleged that the lyrics were derived from their Juboti Radhe and asserted a claim of copyright infringement. One day following the release, and in anticipation of legal action, the producers withdrew the video from their YouTube channel and Facebook page.

=== Re-release ===
In 2022, following the formal confirmation of the song's status as a traditional folk composition, Shorolpur's legal complaint was dismissed. Subsequently, on 21 April 2023, IPDC re-released the song on YouTube.

== Copyright controversy ==
The song is a traditional folk composition of Bengal. Under the copyright laws of Bangladesh, traditional folk songs belong to the public domain. Nevertheless, a controversy arose over the song's ownership. Two copyrights were obtained in Bangladesh for this song, under the titles Juboti Radhe and Binodini Rai. On 4 June 2018, without crediting the Baul and his spiritual companion, Shorolpur obtained copyright from the Bangladesh Copyright Office for their produced version; the subsequent release of their copyrighted material on an unofficial YouTube channel without explicit copyright notice led to confusion among performers of later versions.

Shorolpur subsequently filed claims of infringement, demands for removal, and legal complaints against the later-released versions. In 2018, Sumi Mirza had credited her rendition as "collected". Sumi claimed that the lyrical source of her version was the Mymensingh Gitika, but was initially unable to substantiate this claim. When Shorolpur took legal action against Sumi, the Copyright Office ruled in Shorolpur's favour. Sumi subsequently modified the phrasing of her version while retaining thematic similarities, re-releasing it under the title Binodini Rai with a separate copyright. As of the latest reports, the dispute between Sumi and Shorolpur remains formally unresolved within the Bangladeshi judicial system. Additionally, Shorolpur initiated a complaint against IPDC. They stated that "there is no exact match with any other song anywhere" and, claiming the lyrics and melody as their own, filed a complaint against IPDC in court.

Folklore scholar Saymon Zakaria raised objections regarding the claimed originality of Juboti Radhe. He presented evidence establishing the kirtan as a vernacular folk song of rural Bangladesh by describing and citing thematic and, in certain instances, verbatim similarities between Shorolpur's lyrics and various lines of the kirtan found in the 1960 edition of Bangiya Lok-Sangit Ratnakar edited by Ashutosh Bhattacharya, the 1962 edition of Banglar Loksahitya, and the handwritten manuscript of the poem Banshi Churi (Flute Theft) by Pabna-based Baul Nepal Chandra Das. In addition to textual evidence, he submitted video footage of the song being performed as a "closing song" at Baul festivals to demonstrate its antiquity and communal ownership.

On 23 October 2020, following the presentation of documentation dating back 60 years substantiating the song's status as traditional folk heritage, on 28 October, IPDC filed a counter-complaint at the Bangladesh Copyright Office challenging the originality of Shorolpur's version. On 2 November, a legal notice was issued seeking the cancellation of Shorolpur's copyright on the grounds that the originality of the song could not be established due to the near-verbatim similarity between its phrasing and the writings published in the poet Dwija Kanai's Mahua Pala, Ashutosh Bhattacharya's Banglar Lok-Sahitya (Volume 2), and Bimal Kumar Mukhopadhyay's Banglar Gramya Chhara. Both parties were directed to submit evidence regarding the song's folk provenance and the proposed revocation of copyright. The Copyright Office sought the expert opinions of faculty members from the Department of Folklore at Bangla Academy, Jatiya Kabi Kazi Nazrul Islam University, Jahangirnagar University, and University of Rajshahi. Following the expert investigation confirming the song's provenance as a folk song, the Copyright Office formally revoked Shorolpur's copyright on 26 January 2022.
