= Bhar =

Indian caste

Bhars
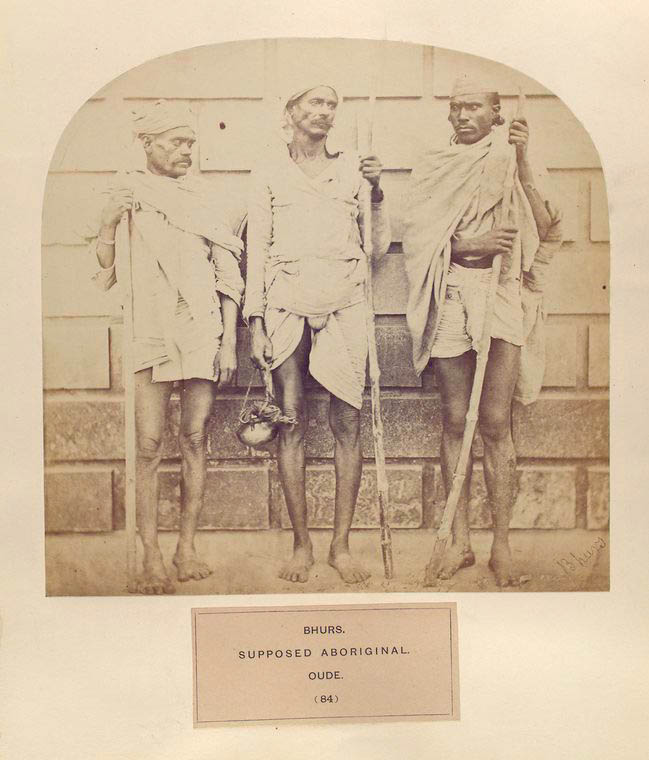
- Religions: Hinduism
- Languages: Hindi • Avadhi • Bhojpuri
- Related groups: Rajbhar

Bhar is a caste or community in India.

== History ==
Influenced by the Arya Samaj movement, as were members of other castes, Baijnath Prasad Adhyapak published Rajbhar Jati ka Itihas in 1940. This book attempted to prove that the Rajbhar were formerly rulers who were related to the ancient Bhar tribe.

== Present ==
A community that is related to the Bhar by occupation in Uttar Pradesh is Rajbhar. It falls under the Other Backwards Class category in Uttar Pradesh. There were proposals in 2013 that some or all of these communities in the state should be reclassified as Scheduled Castes under India's system of positive discrimination; this would have involved declassifying them from the OBC category. Whether or not this would happen was a significant issue in the campaign for the 2014 Indian general election.

They are among 17 OBC communities that were again proposed for Scheduled Caste status by the Samajwadi Party-controlled Government of Uttar Pradesh. However, this proposal, which relates to votebank politics, has been stayed by the courts; the prior attempt had been rejected by the Government of India.

In 2019, Yogi government of Uttar Pradesh again tried to include these 17 castes as scheduled caste but due to objection raised by Centre and Allahabad High Court, the proposal was stopped.

== See also ==
- Rajwar
- Rajbhar
