= Heritage Archives =

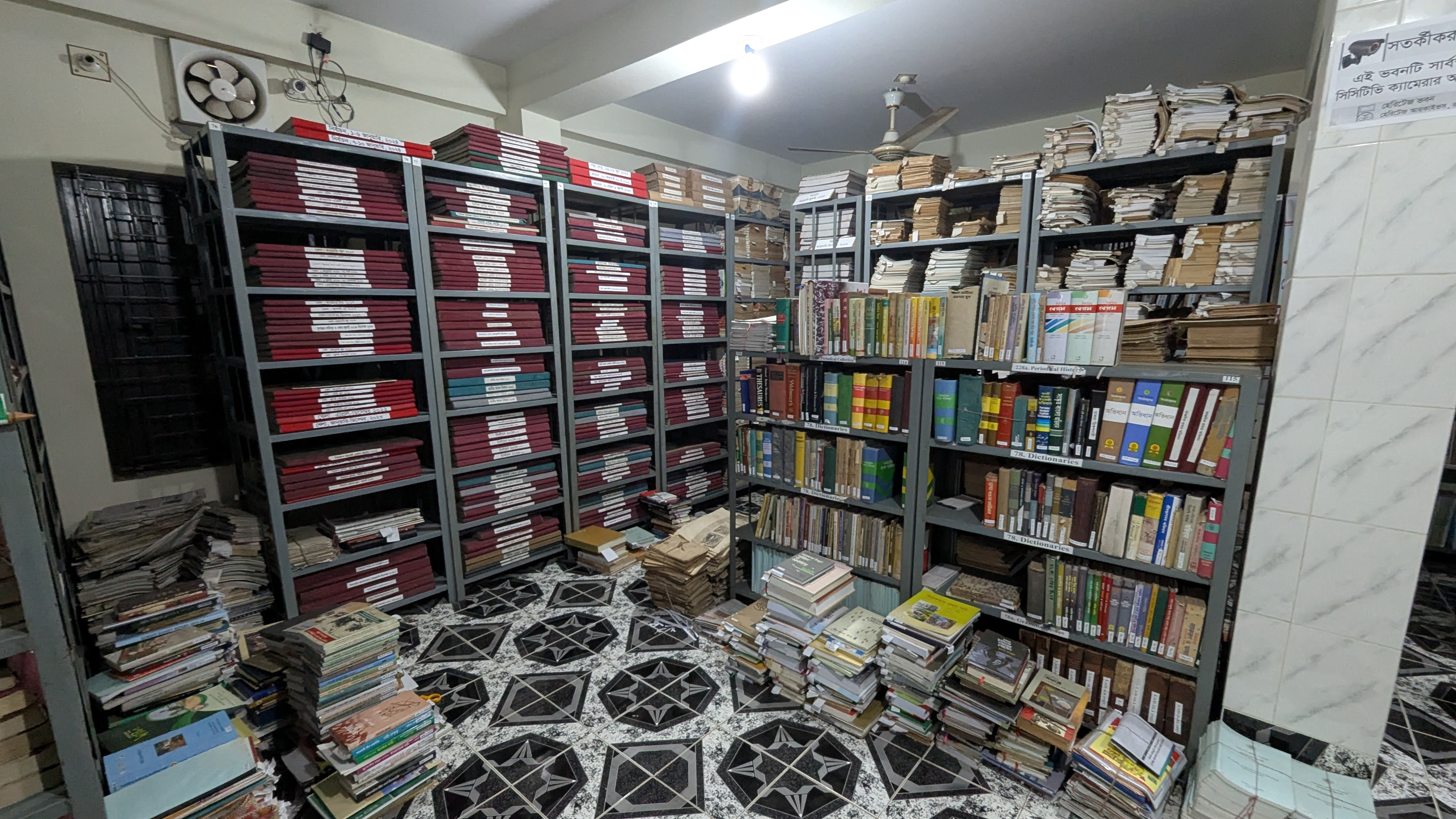
- A part of the Archive
- Interactive map of Heritage Archives
- 24°21′43″N 88°37′56″E
- Alternative names: Heritage: Archives of Bangladesh History; Heritage: Historical Archives of Bangladesh
- Location: Rajshahi, Bangladesh
- Employees: 6
- Website: heritage-archives.org

Heritage Archives is an independent professional repository in Rajshahi, Bangladesh, dedicated to preserving important documents, photographs, journals, periodicals, magazines, local history books, and digital materials. It was founded by Dr. Mahbubar Rahman, a retired professor from the Department of History at the University of Rajshahi. The archive aims to collect, document, and safeguard resources related to the history and heritage of Bangladesh.

== Background ==
Mahbubar Rahman was inspired to establish Heritage Archives after visiting a similar repository in Netherlands in the 1990s. The building was officially established in 2006. It was expanded into a 3-floor-building by the Ministry of Cultural Affairs in 2011.
