= Ali Newaz Mahmud Khaiyam =

Bangladeshi politician

- আলী নেওয়াজ মাহমুদ খৈয়াম
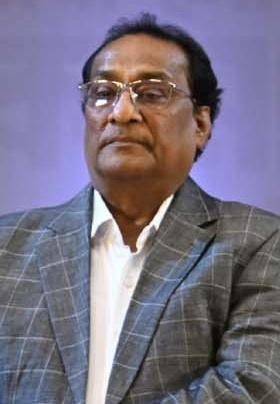
- Newaz in 2026

Minister of State for Cultural Affairs
- Incumbent
- Assumed office 17 February 2026
- Prime Minister: Tarique Rahman
- Preceded by: K. M. Khalid

Member of Parliament
- Incumbent
- Assumed office 17 February 2026
- Preceded by: Kazi Keramat Ali
- Constituency: Rajbari-1
- In office 28 October 2001 – 27 October 2006
- Preceded by: Kazi Keramat Ali
- Succeeded by: Kazi Keramat Ali
- Constituency: Rajbari-1

Personal details
- Born: 25 May 1957 (age 69) Rajbari, East Pakistan
- Party: Bangladesh Nationalist Party

Ali Newaz Mahmud Khaiyam (born 25 May 1957) is a Bangladesh Nationalist Party politician and the incumbent State Minister of Cultural Affairs and a Jatiya Sangsad member representing the Rajbari-1 constituency.

Ali Newaz Mahmud Khayyam was born in Gopalpur village of Madapur Union, Kalukhali Upazila, Rajbari district.

Ali Newaz Mahmud Khayyam is a member of the BNP Central Executive Committee and the President of Rajbari District BNP. He was elected as the Chairman of Rajbari Municipality three times until 2000. He was elected as a Member of Parliament in the 2001 National Parliament election as a candidate of the Bangladesh Nationalist Party from the Rajbari-1 (Sadar-Goaland) constituency.[2] He participated in the 2008 and 2018 elections and was defeated.[3] Thirteenth National Parliament Election 2026 Ali Newaz Mahmud Khayyam Bangladesh Nationalist Party (BNP) candidate from the Rajbari-1 (Sadar-Goaland) constituency was elected as a Member of Parliament in the National Parliament election. Later, he became the State Minister of the Ministry of Cultural Affairs.
