= Bangladesh Copyright Office =

Organisation responsible for copyright management in Bangladesh

- বাংলাদেশ কপিরাইট অফিস
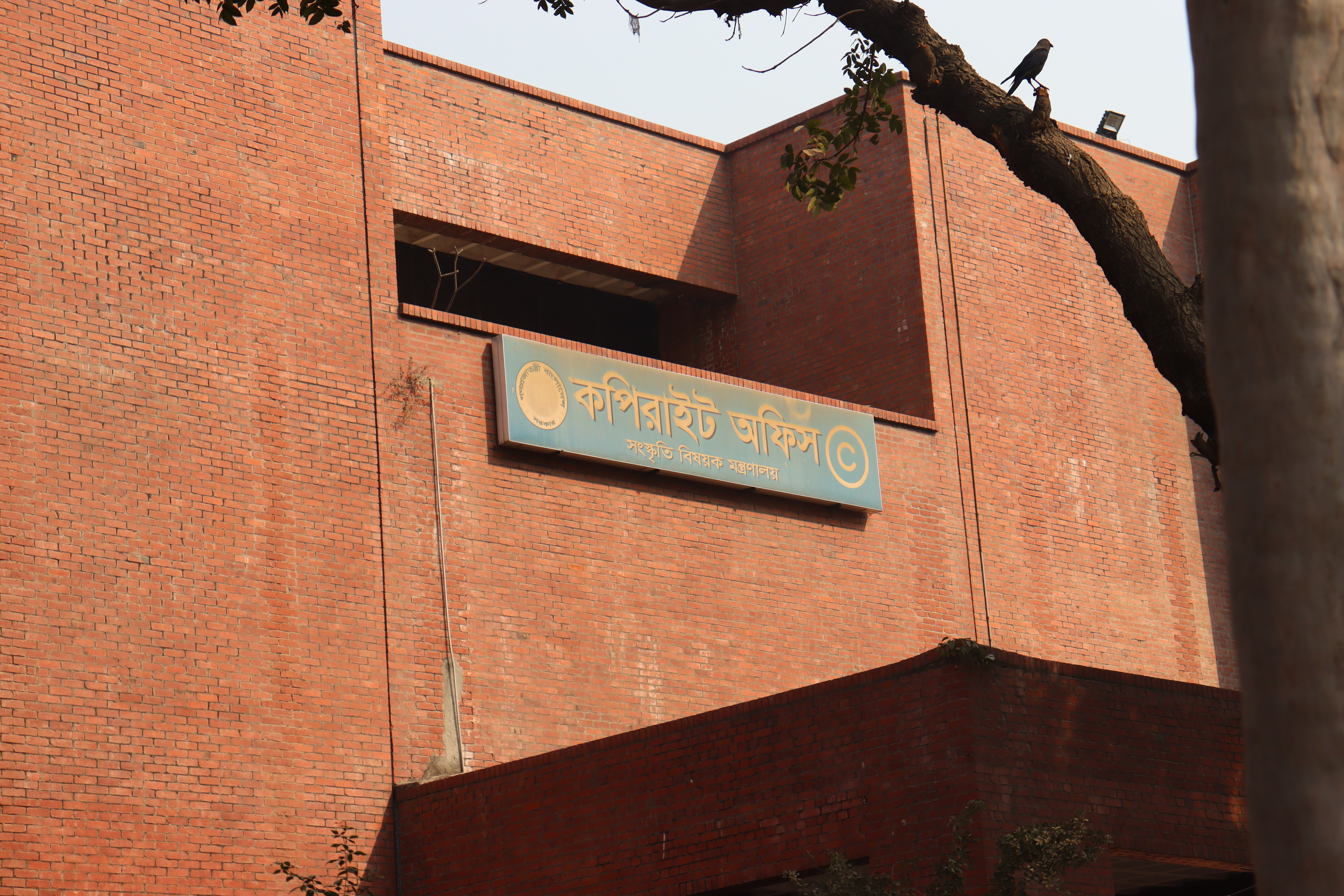
- Bangladesh Copyright Office in Agargaon

Agency overview
- Formed: 1971
- Jurisdiction: Government of Bangladesh
- Headquarters: Dhaka, Bangladesh
- Parent department: Ministry of Cultural Affairs
- Website: copyrightoffice.gov.bd

Bangladesh Copyright Office is a national level quasi-judicial organisation responsible for copyright management in Bangladesh. It is located in Dhaka, Bangladesh.

== History ==
After the independence of Bangladesh in 1971, the regional copyright office was made the national copyright office. It is a department under the ministry of culture. It has been criticized for failing to coordinate with the Department of Patents, Designs and Trademarks, both of which are responsible for the protection of intellectual property in Bangladesh. Copyright applications are available on its website.

== See also ==
- Copyright law of Bangladesh
- Sorboto Mongolo Radhe Binodini Rai
