= Salma Chowdhury =

Bangladeshi politician

- সালমা চৌধুরী

Member of 11th Jatiya Sangsad of Reserved Seats for Women Seat-34
- In office 4 August 2019 – 31 December 2023
- Preceded by: Rushema Begum

Personal details
- Born: 1 November 1971 (age 54)
- Party: Awami League
- Parent: Md. Abdul Wajed Chowdhury (father)
- Occupation: Politician

Salma Chowdhury (born 1 November 1971) is an Awami League politician and former Member of 11th Jatiya Sangsad in the Reserved Seats for Women.

== Career ==
Chowdhury was elected to parliament from reserved seat in August 2019 by the Awami League representing Rajbari District. In August 2020, she was airlifted to Dhaka Medical College Hospital by Bangladesh Air Force from Rajbari District after catching COVID-19.

== Personal life ==
Chowdhury's father, Md. Abdul Wajed Chowdhury, was a Jatiya Sangsad member representing the Rajbari-1 constituency. Her husband, Suleman Khan, is a bureaucrat and secretary of the Ministry of Education.
