= Jahanara Begum (politician) =

Bangladeshi politician (c.1942–2021)

- জাহানারা বেগম

State Minister of Cultural Affairs
- In office 5 March 1991 – 24 November 1995

Member of Parliament for Rajbari-1
- In office 19 March 1996 – 30 March 1996
- Preceded by: Kazi Keramat Ali
- Succeeded by: Kazi Keramat Ali

Member of Parliament from the Women's Reserver Seat-22
- In office 5 March 1991 – 24 November 1995

Personal details
- Born: c. 11 February 1942 British Raj
- Died: 24 July 2021 Bashundhara Residential Area
- Party: BNP, BNF, LDP

Jahanara Begum (c. 11 February 1942 – 24 July 2021) was a Bangladeshi politician, a Jatiya Sangsad member representing the Rajbari-1 constituency, and a State Minister of Cultural Affairs.

== Career ==
Begum was the founding general secretary of Bangladesh Jubo Mohila Dal.

Begum was a member of the women's seat-22 in the 5th Jatiya Sangsad in 1991. She was elected a member of parliament from the Rajbari-1 (Sadar-Goaland) constituency on 15 February 1996 in the sixth parliamentary election on the nomination of the Bangladesh Nationalist Party. She was the vice chairman of the BNP.

Begum served twice as the Minister of State for Culture and Adviser to the then Prime Minister Khaleda Zia on Primary Education and Mass Education. She was asked to provide her wealth statement to the Anti-Corruption Commission.

Begum was the co-chairman of the Bangladesh Nationalist Front (BNF). She previously served as secretary general of the Liberal Democratic Party (LDP).

In 2012, Begum joined the Bangladesh Nationalist Front, led by Nazmul Huda, as co-chairman.

== Personal life ==
Begum was married to Ahmed Mostafa (died 1986).
