= Copyright law of Bangladesh =

The basic legal instrument governing copyright law in Bangladesh is the Copyright Act, 2023, which repealed the Copyright Act of 2000. It is largely based on Pakistan's Copyright Ordinance, 1962.

== Copyright Act, 2000 ==
=== Objects of copyright ===
According to section 15 copyright subsists in

- literary works
- dramatic works
- musical works
- artistic works (i.e. painting, sculpture, drawing, engraving or a photograph, a work of architecture and any other work of artistic craftsmanship)
- cinematographic films
- sound recordings

and includes computer programs (cf. s. 14 sub-s. 2) as well as addresses and speeches (cf. s. 17 cl. d).

Foreign works are covered by section 69 read with the International Copyright Order, 2005.

=== Owner of copyright ===
The first owner of copyright in general is author (exceptions: works for hire, Government works; s. 17).

The owner of copyright may assign the copyright (s. 18) or grant any interest in the copyright by license (s. 48). Licenses may also be granted by the Copyright Board (ss. 50–54).

Registration of copyright with the Copyright Office is not obligatory, but if registration has taken place the Register of Copyrights gives prima facie evidence of the particulars entered therein (s. 60).

=== Term of copyright ===
Copyright in a literary, dramatic, musical or artistic work published within the lifetime of the author subsists until 60 years from the beginning of the calendar year next following the year in which the author dies (p.m.a.; s. 24).

Copyright in a cinematographic film (s. 26), a sound recording (s. 27), a photograph (s. 28), a computer program (s. 28A) or a work of the Government, a local authority or an international organisation (ss. 30–32) subsists until 60 years from the beginning of the calendar year next following the publication of the work.

=== Meaning of copyright ===
Copyright means inter alia the exclusive right

- to reproduce the work
- to issue copies of the work to the public
- to perform or broadcast the work
- to make any translation or adaption of the work (for details see s. 14).

In addition, special moral rights lie with the author (s. 78) as well as a droit de suite (s. 23).

=== Copyright infringement ===
When copyright is infringed (s. 71), the owner of copyright (as well as the exclusive licensee) is entitled to certain civil remedies (injunction, damages, accounts; s. 76). Jurisdiction lies with the court of District Judge of the place where the person instituting the proceeding resides or carries on business (s. 81).

Infringing copies are deemed to be the property of the owner of the copyright, who accordingly may take proceedings for the recovery of possession thereof or in respect of the conversion thereof (s. 79). Infringing copies may be seized by the police (s. 93) and can be forbidden to be imported (s. 74).

Copyright infringement may also lead to criminal charges (ss. 82 to 91) to be tried by no court inferior to that of a Court of Sessions (s. 92).

=== No infringement ===
Certain acts are said not to constitute an infringement of copyright (s. 72). These include inter alia

- fair use of a literary, dramatic, musical or artistic work for the purpose of private study, private use, criticism, review (sub-s. 1) or reporting current events (sub-s. 2)
- the reproduction or adaptation of a literary, dramatic, musical or artistic work by a teacher or a pupil for the purpose of instruction or examination (sub-s. 8)
- the publication or performance of a literary, dramatic or musical work by the staff and students of an educational institution (sub-s. 9)
- the making of up to 3 copies of a book by a non-profit or educational library for its use if such book is not available for sale (sub-s. 15)
- the reproduction or publication of certain Government works (unless prohibited; sub-s. 17)
- freedom of panorama: the making or publishing of a painting, drawing, engraving or photograph of architecture (sub-s. 19) or a sculpture or other artistic work if such work is permanently situated in a public place (sub-s. 20)

=== Related rights ===
Related rights include the broadcast reproduction right of broadcasting organisations (s. 33; term 25 years), the performer's right (s. 35; term: 50 years) and the right of publishers relating to the typographical arrangement of their editions (s. 38; term: 25 years).

=== Other provisions ===
- particulars to be included in sound recordings and video films (s. 73)
- legal deposit of books (s. 62) as well as periodicals and newspapers (s. 63) with the National Library of Bangladesh

== See also ==
- List of parties to international copyright treaties
