= Victoria Public Library, Natore =

Library in Natore, Bangladesh

Victoria Public Library
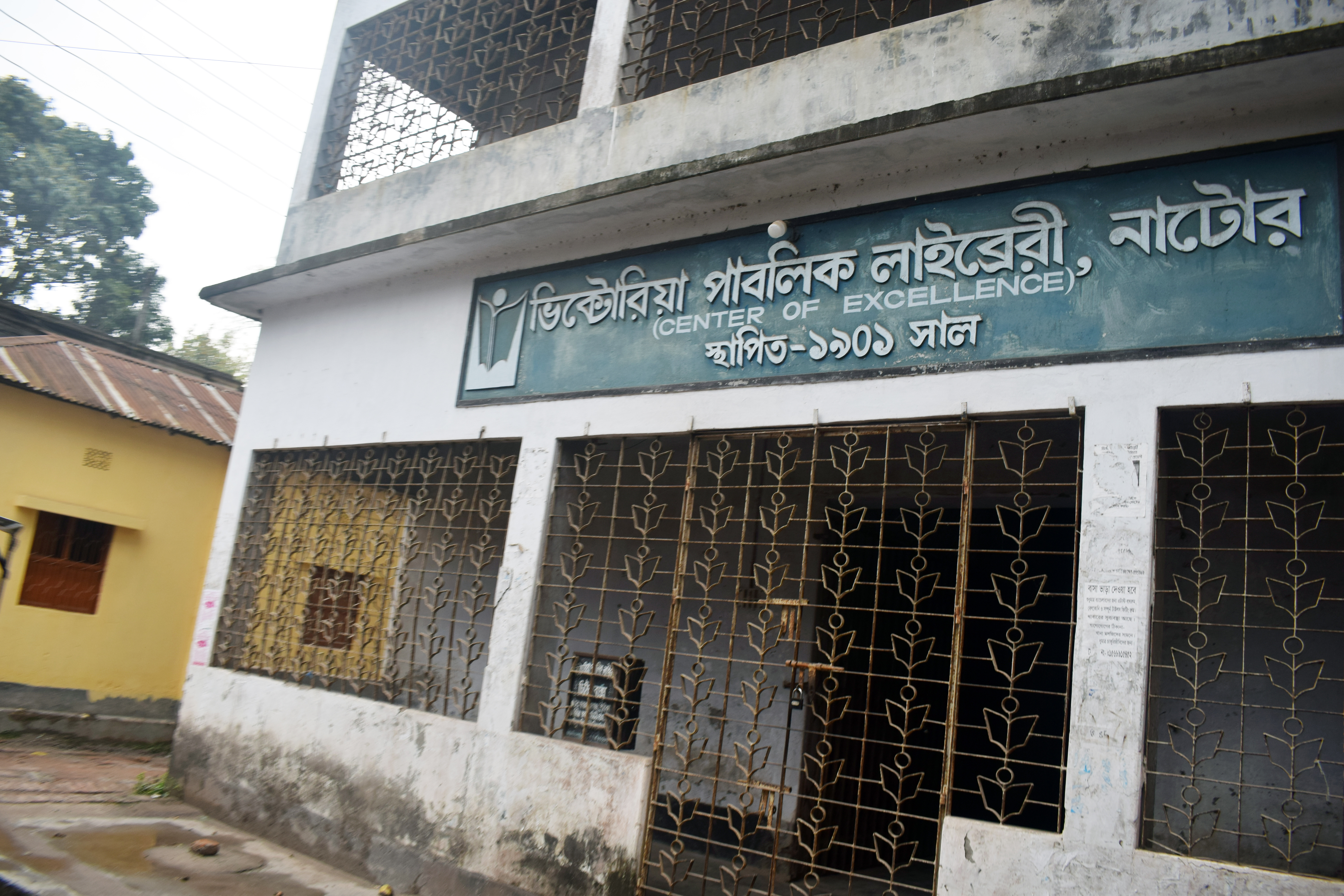
- Formation: 1901; 125 years ago
- Founder: King Jagadindra Nath Roy of Natore
- Type: Library
- Legal status: Public Library
- Headquarters: Natore, Bangladesh
- Location: CX7R+V2G Victoria Public Library Road, Natore 6400
- Region served: Bangladesh
- Official language: Bengali
- Parent organization: Department of Public Libraries

Victoria Public Library (Bengali: ভিক্টোরিয়া পাবলিক লাইব্রেরী) is a public library located in Natore. Maharaja Jagadindra Nath Roy of Natore established the library in 1901 on the advice of Rabindranath Tagore.

== Location ==
Currently, the library is located on Victoria Public Library Road, Kafuriyapatti, Natore. Although at the time of its establishment, the library was established in the Lalbazar area of Natore city.

== History ==
King Jagadindra Nath Roy of Natore was a favorite of Rabindranath Tagore. Rabindranath Tagore came to Natore in 1898 at the invitation of King Jagadindra Nath Roy. At that time, Tagore advised and inspired King Jagadindra Nath Roy to establish a general library in his capital. With this inspiration from Tagore, King Jagadindra Nath Roy established the Victoria Public Library in Natore in 1901.
