= Rajbari Government College =

Public college Rajbari, Bangladesh

- রাজবাড়ী সরকারি কলেজ
- Official logo
- Motto: জ্ঞানই শক্তি
- Motto in English: Knowledge is Power
- Type: Government college
- Established: 23 June 1961; 65 years ago
- Academic affiliations: Dhaka Education Board (HSC); National University
- Principal: Hossneara Khatun
- Faculty: 65
- Students: 11,000
- Location: College Para, Binodpur, Rajbari Sadar Upazila, Rajbari, 7700, Bangladesh; 23.7642°N 89.6410°E
- Campus: Urban-rural, 5.7 hectares (14 acres)
- Website: rajbarigovtcollege.edu.bd

Rajbari Government College (Bengali: রাজবাড়ী সরকারি কলেজ) is a public college situated in Rajbari Sadar Upazila, Bangladesh. Established in 1961 as Rajbari College, it was nationalised in 1980.

== History ==
Civil servant and educationist Quazi Azhar Ali established the college as Rajbari College in 1961.

Half a kilometer west of Rajbari railway station, the two-storied building of the Baptist Mission, along with 48 decimals (0.48 acre) of land, was transferred to the college's governing body. Through purchases and donations of adjacent parcels, the college's land would grow to 14 acres. The foundation stone was laid on 23 June 1961 by the then Sub-Divisional Officer Quazi Azahar Ali. The college began with a humanities and commerce department. A science department was added in 1963. Enrollment increased faster than classroom space, so in 1963 classes were held at Goalanda Model High School. A two-storied academic building was completed in 1964.

The college was nationalised on 1 March 1980, becoming Rajbari Government College. Departments of Bengali, management, political science, and zoology were introduced for the 1996–1997 academic year. They were followed in 1998-1999 by departments of accounting, botany, chemistry, economics, English, history, mathematics, and physics. In the 2015–2016 academic year honors courses in philosophy and Islamic history and culture were added.

== Academics ==
Rajbari Government College offers Higher Secondary School Certificate (HSC), four year Honours, and one year master's degree courses in various disciplines. As of 2023, about 11000 students are enrolled in the college. Number of teachers is 65.

=== HSC level ===
- Science
- Business Studies

=== Honours and master's degree level ===
- Department of Accounting
- Department of Bengali
- Department of Botany
- Department of Chemistry
- Department of Economics
- Department of English
- Department of History
- Department of Islamic History and Culture
- Department of Management
- Department of Mathematics
- Department of Philosophy
- Department of Political Science
- Department of Physics
- Department of Sociology
- Department of Zoology

== Notable alumni ==
- Chanchal Chowdhury, actor, two-time National Film Awards winner
- Kazi Keramat Ali, former MP and State Minister for Technical and Madrasa Education (2018-2020
- )
- S. M. Kuddus Zaman, Justice of the High Court Division, Supreme Court of Bangladesh
