= Munshi Abdul Latif =

Bangladeshi politician

- মুন্সী আবদুল লতিফ

Member of Parliament for Rajbari-1
- In office 15 April 1988 – 6 December 1990
- Preceded by: Akkas Ali Miah
- Succeeded by: Md. Abdul Wajed Chowdhury

Personal details
- Party: Jatiya Party

Munshi Abdul Latif is a Bangladeshi politician and a former Jatiya Sangsad member representing the Rajbari-1 constituency.

== Career ==
Latif was elected to parliament from Rajbari-1 as a combined opposition candidate in 1988.
