= Sufia Kamal National Public Library =

Sufia Kamal National Public Library সুফিয়া কামাল জাতীয় গণগ্রন্থাগার
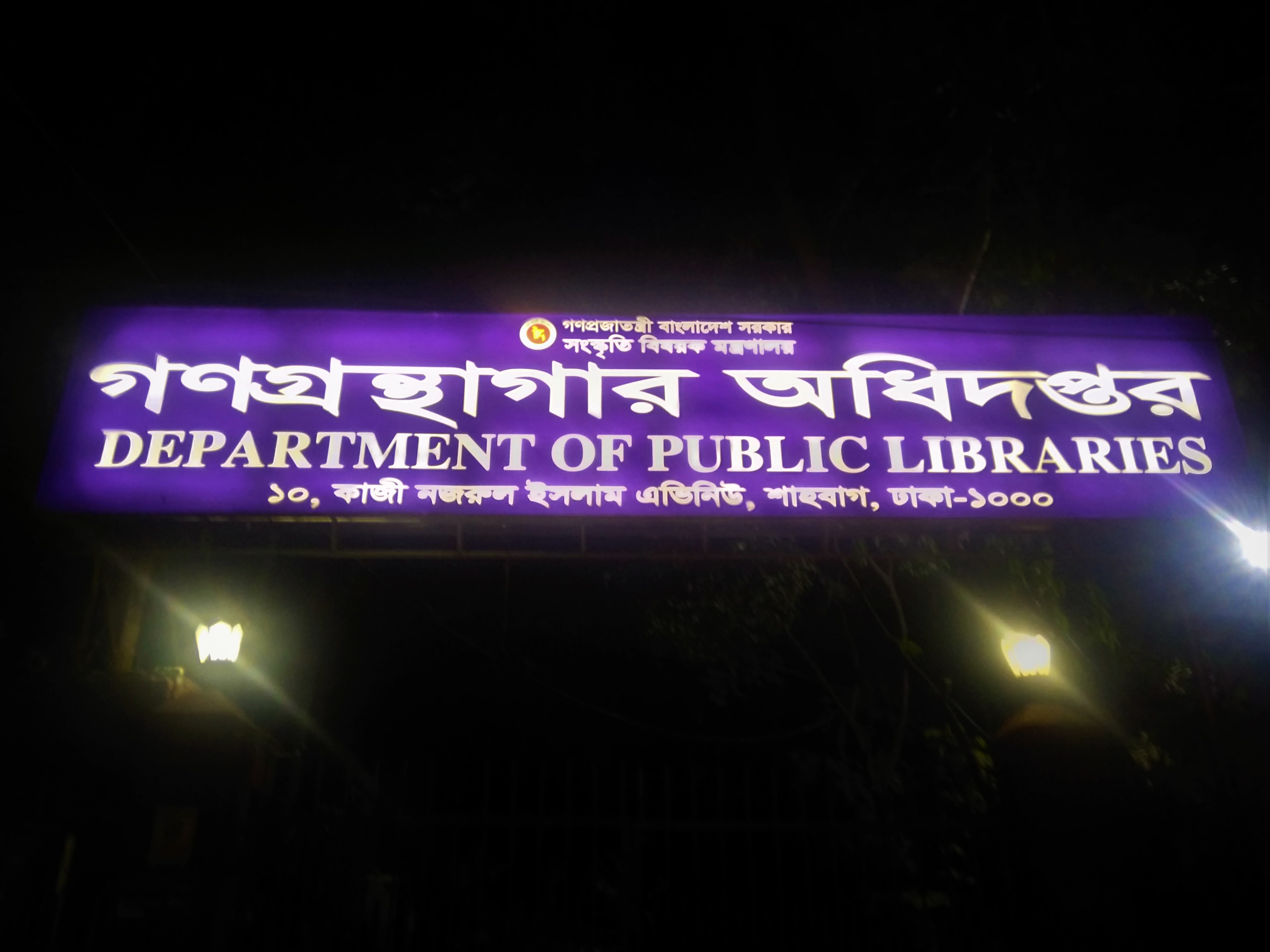

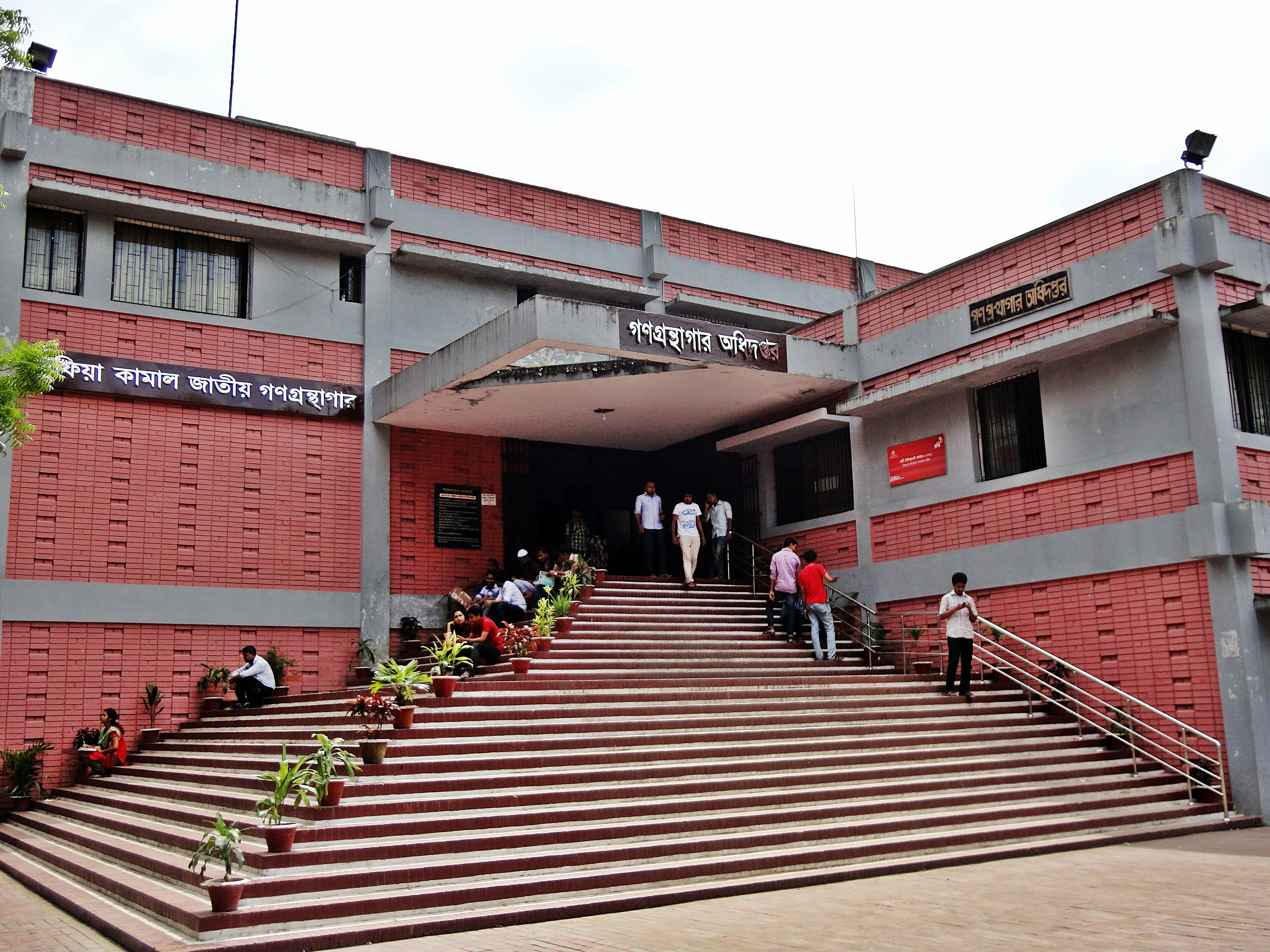
- Sufia Kamal National Public Library entrance.
- 23.736444°N 90.394798°E
- Location: 10 Kazi Nazrul Islam Avenue, Shahbag, Dhaka, Bangladesh, 1000., Bangladesh
- Established: 1954
- Branch of: Department of Public Libraries
- Branches: 64

Collection
- Size: 119,750 (as of March 2007)

Other information
- Website: sknpl.portal.gov.bd

The Sufia Kamal National Public Library (Bengali: সুফিয়া কামাল জাতীয় গণগ্রন্থাগার) is the largest public library in Bangladesh and houses the central administration of the Department of Public Libraries, under the Ministry of Cultural Affairs. The library was named "Central Public Library" between 2004 and 2010. The library is located in Dhaka's Shahbag neighbourhood.

The auditorium (Shawkat Osman Auditorium) of the library is a major venue for cultural events in Dhaka, including the International Short and Independent Film Festival. It also houses the Library Training Institute funded and managed by the Library Association of Bangladesh (LAB). It also has a reprography service, in-house bindery and conservation section.

== History ==
The foundation stone for Dhaka Central Public Library was laid in 1954 with the Registrar of Dhaka University as part-time Librarian. Designated to be the centre for the public library system in the then East Pakistan on the basis of the recommendations made by Australian Library consultant Mr. L C Key in 1955, it was opened to the public on 22 March 1958 with a stock of 10,040 books. In 1978 the library moved to its building near the Shahbag Intersection from its original building designed by pioneering Bangladeshi architect Mazharul Islam, which went on to house the Dhaka University Central Library. The Department of the Public Libraries was established with Bangladesh Central Public Library as its headquarters in 1984. Between 1980 and 1985 UNESCO provided nearly 9.9 million Bangladeshi taka to develop the library.

The library has undergone a number of name changes. Previously it was named the Sufia Kamal National Public Library after the Bangladeshi writer Begum Sufia Kamal. However, in 2004 the name was changed to the "Central Public Library", amid protests from cultural activists who cited Sufia Kamal worthy of the honour. However, the Bangladesh Nationalist Party State Minister for Cultural Affairs, Selina Rahman, defended the decision at the time, stating, "We're not changing the name, rather restoring it to its original one. Our aim is not to name any government institution after any person." However, in 2010 the subsequent Awami League administration again changed the name back to Sufia Kamal National Public Library.

In February 2022, the government announced that the library building would be demolished to make way for a more modern facility. In the interim, library operations would be shifted to the Institution of Diploma Engineers, Bangladesh (IDEB) at Kakrail for a minimum of three years.

== Collection ==
As of March 2007, the Library had 119,750 books in its collection, including old and rare books with historical value, along with a small valuable collection of 40 to 50 manuscripts titles for research and reference services. Books in the collection are mostly in Bengali and English, as well as other languages including Urdu, Hindi, Arabic and Persian. As a depository library, it deposits all Bangladeshi publications under the Copyright. The Library receives most of the Bangladeshi daily newspapers and periodicals. It also has a special collection of juvenile material and is providing separate reading facilities for children. The Dewey Decimal Classification (DDC) system with minor modifications is used to organise library materials.

== Library hours ==
The library remains open from 8:00 a.m. to 8:00 p.m. on all days except Fridays and national holidays. On 26 July 2003 started 24 hours reader service, which ceased on 1 March 2004 since drug abusers were taking opportunity of those hours. The district and branch libraries managed by the Department of Public Libraries remain open from 11:00 a.m. to 6:00 p.m. on all days except Fridays and government holidays. Lending facilities were introduced in 1994. As of 2004, the average number of readers was about 2,500 a day.
