= Umesh Chandra Public Library =

Public Library at Khulna in Bangladesh

Umesh Chandra Public Library, Khulna
- Formation: 1897; 129 years ago
- Type: Government
- Legal status: Public Library
- Headquarters: Khulna, Bangladesh
- Location: 3, Children Hospital Road, Officepara, Khulna, 9100
- Region served: Bangladesh
- Official language: Bengali
- Parent organization: Department of Public Libraries

Umesh Chandra Public Library (Bengali: উমেশচন্দ্র পাবলিক লাইব্রেরি) is a library located in Khulna, South Bengal. The library was established in 1897. It currently has a collection of about 30,000 books. It is the most popular library in Khulna.

== Location ==
The library is located on Children Hospital Road in the Officepara area of Khulna. In front of the library is Khulna District Stadium and next to it are Khulna Children Hospital and Khulna branch of Bangladesh Bank. The building where the library currently operates is called Zahid Smriti Bhaban.

== History ==
On February 4, 1897, some enthusiastic people of the then Khulna city decided to establish a library through a domestic meeting. Roy Bahadur Kiran Chandra Roy extended his financial support. Kiran Chandra Roy was one of the most powerful landlord of Narail. His father's name was Umesh Chandra Roy. The library was named after him.

The library officially started its journey on May 1, 1897, in a small room in the then Khulna Municipality. When the new municipality building was built in 1899, the library's space increased. When the municipality building was expanded in 1931, two rooms were allocated for the library.

In 1983, a respected person named Zahidur Rahman was the Vice Chairman of Khulna Municipality and a freedom fighter. When he died in a road accident, in order to preserve his memory, a one-story building was constructed on the abandoned land next to Bangladesh Bank (Khulna branch) at the initiative of the local administration, which was named Zahid Smriti Bhaban. The Khulna Municipality and the Library Committee jointly decided to shift the library to Zahid Smriti Bhaban. On February 21, 1984, the process of shifting the Umesh Chandra Library to Zahid Smriti Bhaban was completed. As a result, after a long 87 years of its establishment, the library got its own identity. On May 1, 1983, the Khulna Municipal Authority officially handed over the building and land to the Library Authority.

Due to the increase in demand for the library, problems arose in accommodating the library space within a short time. In 1990, the library building, i.e. the Zahid Smriti Bhaban, was expanded from one floor to two floors. Currently, the building has three floors. The ground floor of the library building is used as an auditorium, the second floor is a library and reading room, and the third floor is being used as a research reading room. The research reading room has been formed with seven thousand books from the personal collection of Khulna's eminent doctor M. A. Manaf.
