= Abdul Wajed Chowdhury =

Bangladesh Awami League politician

Md. Abdul Wajed Chowdhury
- আবদুল ওয়াজেদ চৌধুরী

Member of Parliament for Rajbari-1
- In office 5 March 1991 – 31 July 1992
- Preceded by: Munshi Abdul Latif
- Succeeded by: Kazi Keramat Ali

Personal details
- Died: 31 July 1992
- Political party: Bangladesh Awami League
- Children: Salma Chowdhury

Md. Abdul Wajed Chowdhury (died 31 July 1992) was a Bangladesh Awami League politician and a Jatiya Sangsad member representing the Rajbari-1 constituency.

== Career ==
Chowdhury was elected to parliament from Rajbari-1 as a Bangladesh Awami League candidate in 1991.

== Death ==
Chowdhury died on 31 July 1992.
