= Rushema Begum =

Bangladeshi politician (died 2019)

- রুশেমা বেগম

Member of 11th Jatiya Sangsad of Reserved Seats for Women Seat-34
- In office 16 February 2019 – 9 July 2019
- Preceded by: Amina Ahmed
- Succeeded by: Salma Chowdhury

Personal details
- Born: 1933/1934
- Died: 9 July 2019 Faridpur, Bangladesh
- Party: Bangladesh Awami League
- Spouse: Imamuddin Ahmad
- Children: 3
- Occupation: Teacher, politician

Rushema Begum (1933/1934 – 9 July 2019) was a Bangladeshi teacher and politician who was elected as Member of 11th Jatiya Sangsad of Reserved Seats for Women. She was a politician of Bangladesh Awami League.

== Career ==
Begum had started her career as a teacher of Ishan Memorial High School of Faridpur District. Later, she had become the Headmistress of the institution too. Her husband Imamuddin Ahmad was elected as an MP in First General Election of Bangladesh from Faridpur-5 (now Faridpur-3). He was connected to the politics of Bangladesh Awami League.

Begum was elected as a Member of 11th Jatiya Sangsad of Reserved Seats for Women on 16 February 2019. She had died on 9 July 2019 in Faridpur Heart Foundation Hospital at the age of 85.
