= Woodburn Library =

Govt. Public Library at Bogura in Bangladesh

Woodburn Library, Bogura
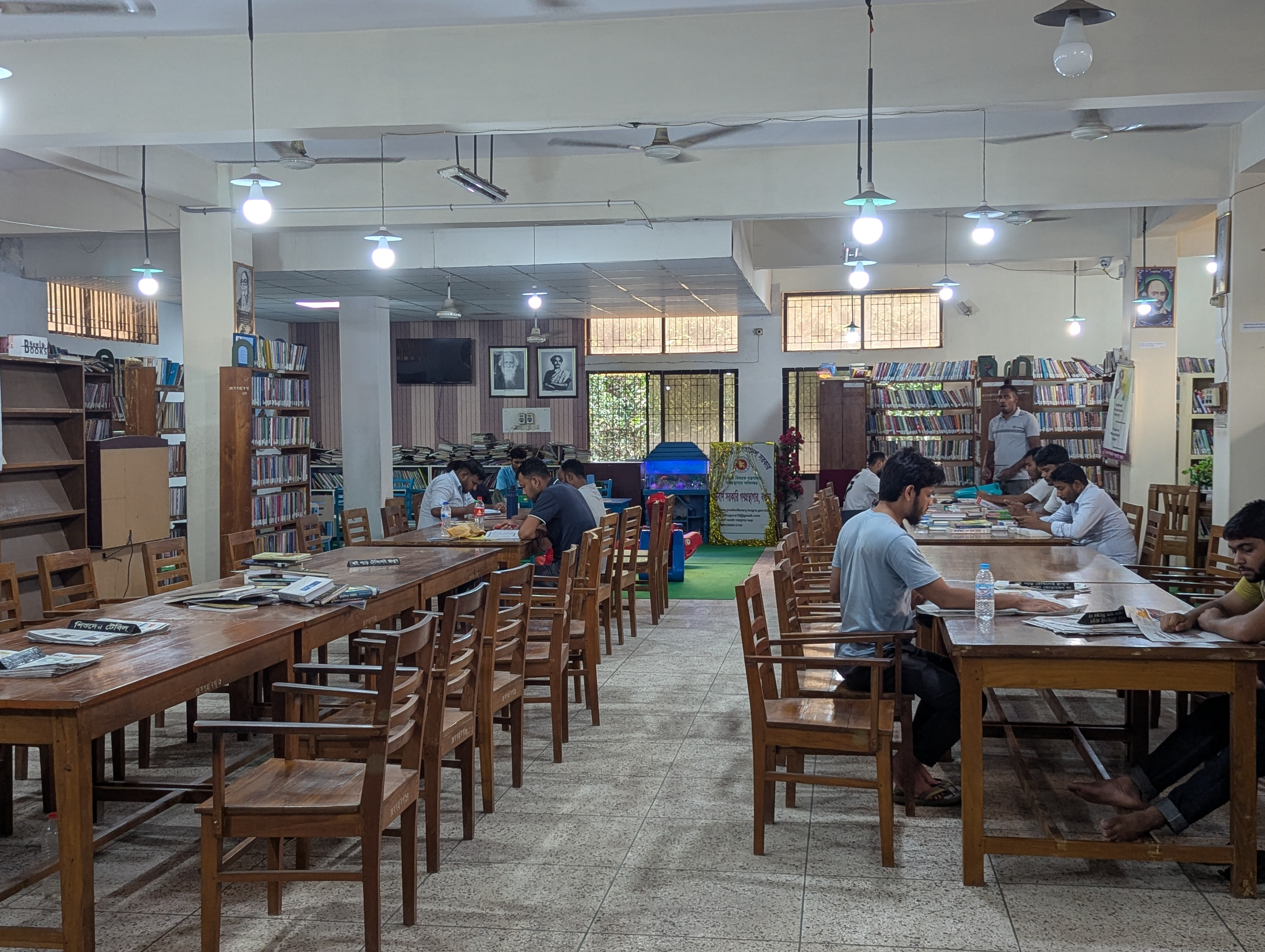
- Present reading room of the library
- Formation: 1854; 172 years ago
- Type: Government
- Legal status: Public Library
- Headquarters: Bogura, Bangladesh
- Location: R9W9+JQ8, Sheujgari Water Tank Road, Bogura 5800
- Region served: Bangladesh
- Official language: Bengali
- Parent organization: Department of Public Libraries
- Website: publiclibrary.bogra.gov.bd

Woodburn Library, Bogura or Woodburn Government Public Library, Bogura (Bengali: বগুড়া উডবার্ন জেলা সরকারি গ্রন্থাগার) is the public and district library of Bogura, Bangladesh. The library started its journey in 1854 in a wooden building in the Station Club area on the banks of the River Karatoya with the help of an English official named Mr. Real.

This old library houses many rare collections, including rare manuscripts of three Sanskrit poems by the 15th century royal poet Shrimad Gyanendra Kumar Bhattacharya. Most of the books in the library are between 50 and 150 years old.

== History ==
This library was first established in 1854. The then Nawab of Bogura, Abdus Sobhan Chowdhury, built the building for this library. In 1908, the then Collector of Bogura and Governor of Bengal, J.N. Gupta, named it after Sir John Woodburn. In 1930, it was damaged in a fire. Then, with the help of Nawab Syed Abdus Sobhan Chowdhury, it was shifted to Edward Park.

The library was damaged in the Bangladesh Liberation War in 1971. The Pakistani army used about 18 thousand books of the Library as fuel for preparing their food during the war. Many rare and invaluable books were lost that time.

After being locked for more than a decade due to various reasons, on March 15, 2014, according to the decision of the Directorate of Public Libraries of the Ministry of Culture, it was merged with the District Government Public Library and named as Woodburn Government Public Library.

== Collection ==
At the time of merger, the Woodburn Government Library had 28,482 books, of which 8,000 were acquired by the Government Public Library. It houses rare manuscripts of three volumes written in Sanskrit by the 15th century royal poet Shrimad Gyanendra Kumar Bhattacharya. Each manuscript is about 1,000 pages long, written with ink and bamboo pen on ancient tula paper. The names of the three volumes are Padma Purana, Govinda Kathamrita and Hiranyakashipu. There are about 8,000 books here, including old stories, novels, essays, journals, reference books, and books in Sanskrit and English.
