= Akkas Ali Miah =

Bangladeshi politician

Member of Bangladesh Parliament
- In office 1986–1988
- Succeeded by: Munshi Abdul Latif

Personal details
- Party: Jatiya Party (Ershad)

Akkas Ali Miah is a Jatiya Party (Ershad) politician and a former member of parliament for Rajbari-1.

== Career ==
Miah was elected to parliament from Rajbari-1 as a Jatiya Party candidate in 1986.
