= Rajbhar =

Indian caste

Rajbhar/Bhar
Regions with significant populations
- India

Languages
- Hindi

Religion
- Hinduism

Related ethnic groups
- Bhar

Rajbhar (also spelled Rajbhaar) is a caste or community present in the Indian states of Uttar Pradesh, Uttarakhand, Jharkhand, Madhya Pradesh, Rajasthan, Gujarat, Maharashtra, Delhi, Haryana, Punjab, Bihar and others as well as Nepal.

Influenced by the Arya Samaj movement, Bhars started using Rajbhar, Baijnath Prasad Adhyapak published Rajbhar Jati ka Itihas in 1940. This book attempted to prove that the Rajbhar were formerly rulers who were related to an ancient Bhar ruler.

== Origin ==
The Bhar tribe inhabited a vast region extending from Gorakhpur (north India) to Saugor (central India) where they lived in adjoining areas alongside other communities such as the Cherus, Majhwars, and Kols, but the Bhars greatly outnumbered them all. They were extremely powerful specially in Oudh and the stretch of land between Benares and Allahabad, about seventy miles long on both sides of the Ganges was almost entirely under their control. The whole Allahabad district was originally in their possession, even at the present time their presence can be traced in every pargana in those especially those located beyond the Ganges and Yamuna. The Bhars were traditionally characterized as warlike and as engaging in the raiding of caravans as a means of livelihood.

== Rajbhars in Nepal ==
The Central Bureau of Statistics of Nepal classifies the Rajbhar as a subgroup within the broader social group of Madheshi Other Caste. At the time of the 2011 Nepal census, 9,542 people (0.0% of the population of Nepal) were Rajbhar.
