= Laser Vision =

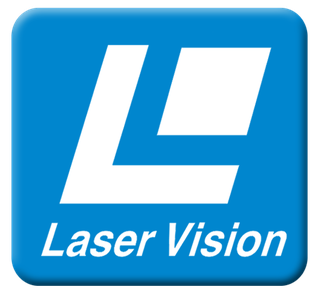
- Founded: 1996
- Founder: Mazharul Islam
- Status: Active
- Distributors: Bangladesh and worldwide
- Genre: Various
- Country of origin: Bangladesh
- Location: Dhaka
- Official website: laservision.com

Laser Vision is an independent record label in Bangladesh. The Daily Star has described Laser Vision as one of the country's top record labels.

== Artists ==
Laser Vision has released recordings for numerous artists, including Rakib Mosabbir, Habib Wahid, Arfin Rumey, Kanak Chapa, Samina Chowdhury, Priyanka Gope, Fahmida Nabi, Belal Khan, Hridoy Khan, Pritom Ahmed, Balam, and Kazi Shuvo.

Most of Laser Vision's releases are albums of modern songs. However, alongside these, they are also known for releasing a small number of Rabindra Sangeet and Nazrul Geeti albums, such as the 2008 release of Nashid Kamal's album Biroher Gulbage.
