= National Book Centre =

Bangladesh government centre

- Formation: 1960
- Headquarters: Dhaka, Bangladesh
- Region served: Bangladesh
- Official language: Bengali
- Website: jgk.gov.bd

The National Book Centre (Bengali: জাতীয় গ্রন্থকেন্দ্র) is a Bangladesh government centre under the Ministry of Cultural Affairs that is responsible for encouraging reading, organizing book fairs, and supporting publishing of books in Bangladesh.

== History ==
In 1960, the National Book Centre of Pakistan was established by the education department of the Federal Government of Pakistan with assistance from UNESCO, having a branch in Dhaka. After Bangladesh's independence in 1971, it was renamed as "National Book Centre Bangladesh". In 1983, the organization became autonomous following the recommendation of the Anam committee's report. In 1995, the "National Book Centre" law was passed in the parliament of Bangladesh, and the organization was subsequently renamed "National Book Centre". In 2016, the government of Bangladesh announced plans to shift the National Book Centre and the Central Public Library to a newly constructed high-rise building. The centre awards annually the National Book Centre Award for notable publications in Bangladesh.
