= Directorate of Archives and Libraries =

Government department of Bangladesh

Department of Archives and Libraries
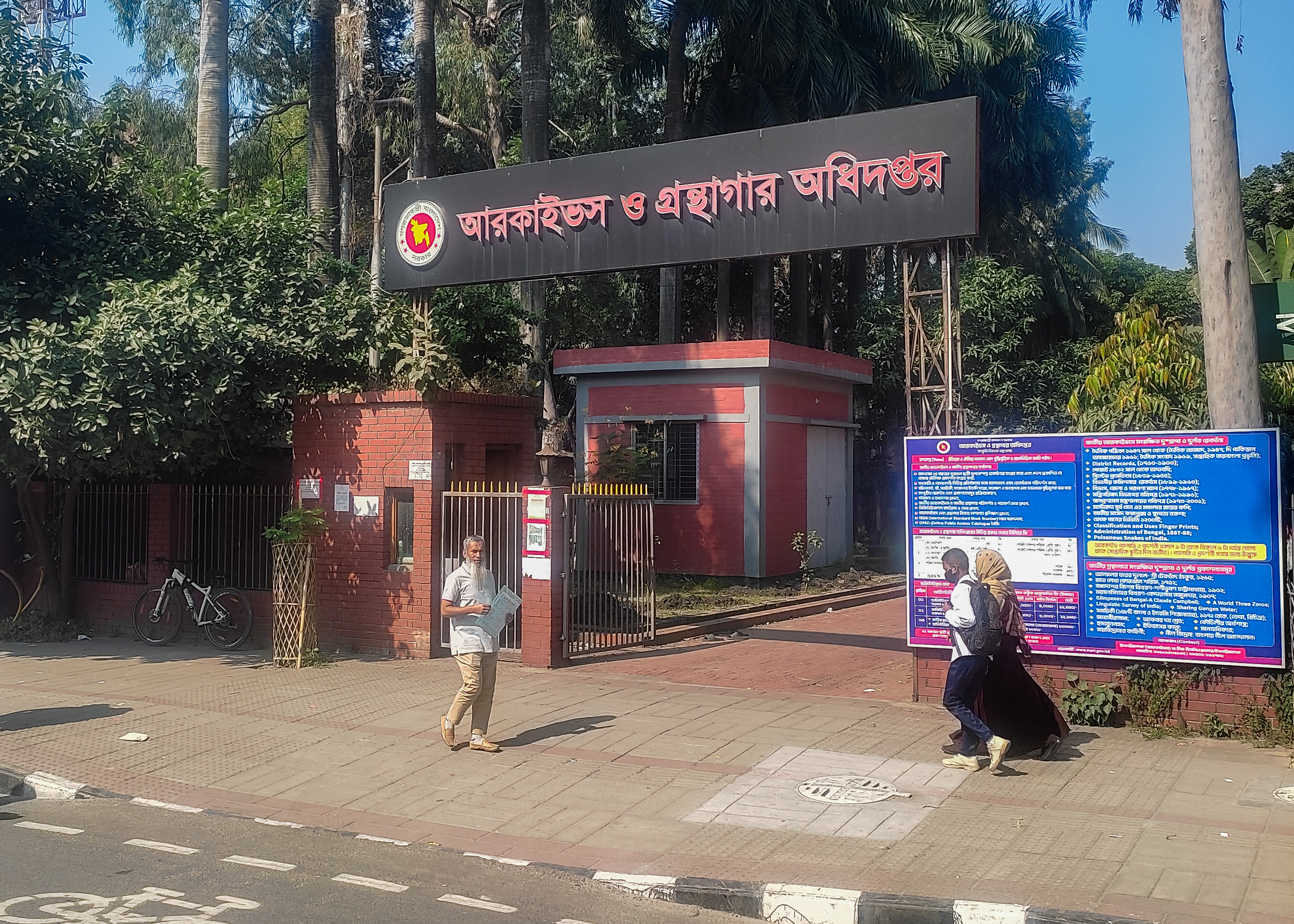
- Formation: 1972
- Headquarters: Dhaka, Bangladesh
- Region served: Bangladesh
- Official language: Bengali
- Website: Department of Archives and Libraries

Department of Archives and Libraries is a government department responsible for the management and operations of the National Library and the National Archives in Bangladesh and is located in Dhaka, Bangladesh. It is the International Standard Book Number agency in Bangladesh responsible for providing publishers with ISBNs.

== History ==
Department of Archives and Library was founded in 1972 by the President of Bangladesh, Sheikh Mujibur Rahman. It was placed under the Ministry of Education initially but later placed under the Ministry of Cultural Affairs. It was initially located in a rented building and in 1986 it was moved to National Library building which was constructed in 1985. In 2001 Prime Minister Sheikh Hasina laid the foundation to build a building for the Department of Archives and Library. The purpose-built headquarters were partially completed in 2004 and fully completed in 2012.
