= National Archives of Bangladesh =

National archives

Coordinates: 23.7760°N 90.3750°E

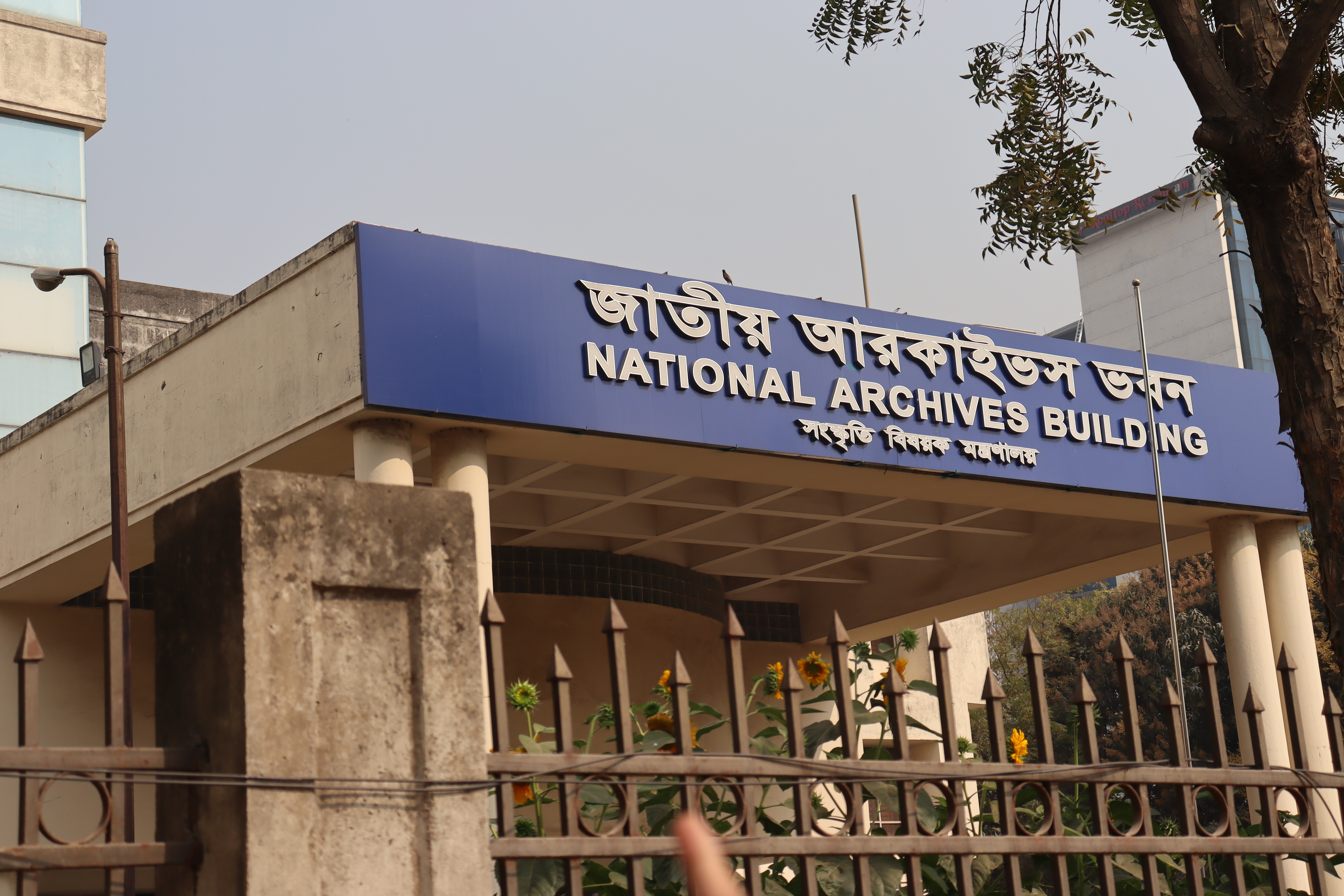
- Formation: 1973
- Headquarters: Dhaka, Bangladesh
- Region served: Bangladesh
- Official language: Bengali
- Website: 159.13.20.196; National Archives of Bangladesh

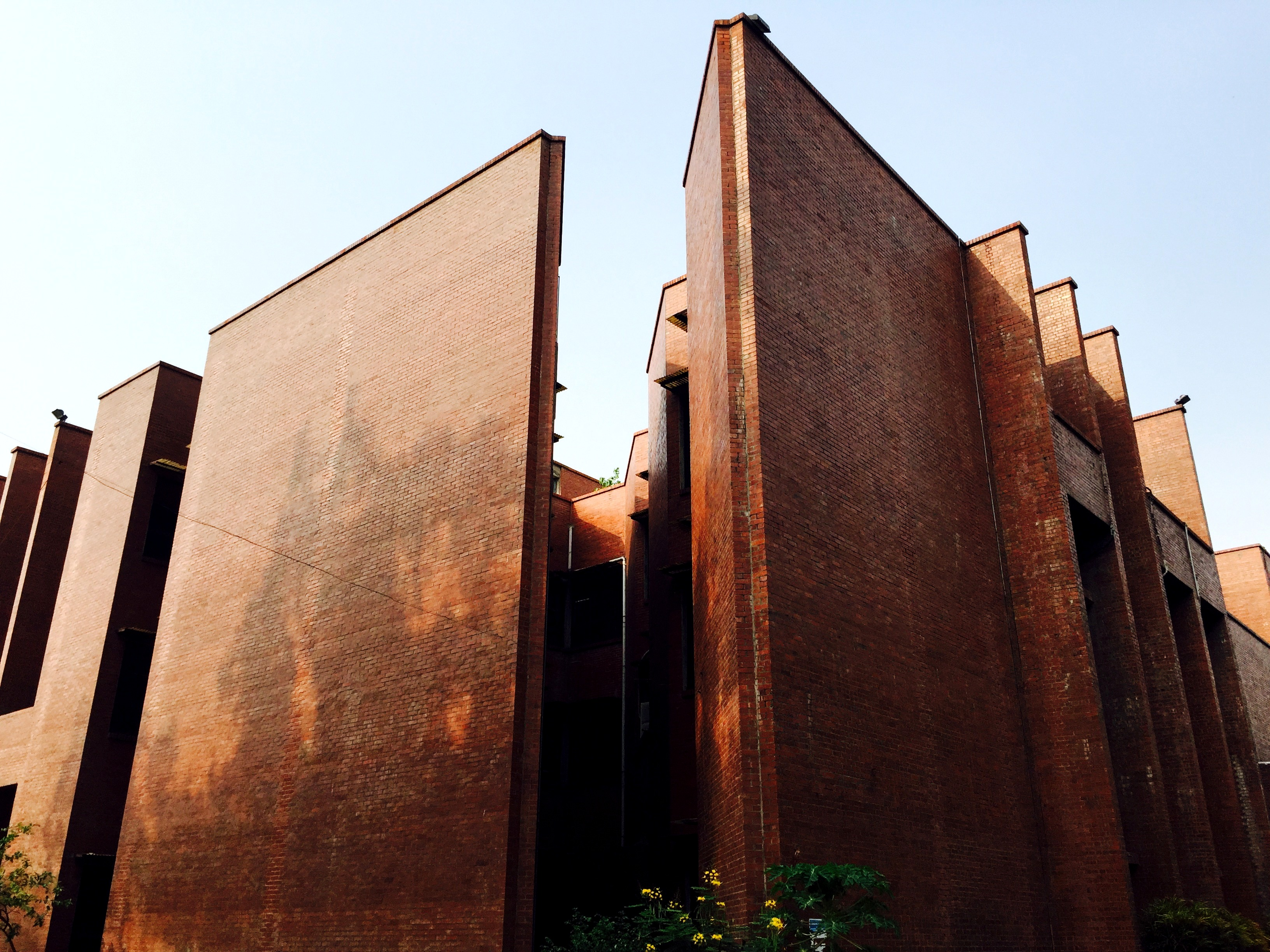
National Library Building

The National Archives of Bangladesh (NAB, Bengali: বাংলাদেশ জাতীয় আরকাইভস, romanized: Bānlādēśa jātīẏa ārakā'ibhasa) are based in Dhaka and contain 225,000 volumes of documents in addition to books, microfilm rolls and newspaper clippings. The archives were founded in 1973 by the government of Bangladesh and are administered by the Directorate of National Archives and Libraries. Located in a rented building near the campus of Dhaka University until 1985, the collections are now housed in a purpose-built part of the National Library of Bangladesh complex in Sher-e-Bangla Nagar.
