= Rajbari-1 =

Constituency of Bangladesh's Jatiya Sangsad

Coordinates: 23.76°N 89.64°E

- Constituency for the Jatiya Sangsad
- District: Rajbari District
- Division: Dhaka Division
- Electorate: 346,619 (2018)

Current constituency
- Created: 1984
- Member: Vacant
- ← 208 Narayanganj-5 210 Rajbari-2 →

Rajbari-1 is a constituency represented in the Jatiya Sangsad (National Parliament) of Bangladesh.

== Boundaries ==
The constituency encompasses Goalanda and Rajbari Sadar upazilas.

== History ==
The constituency was created in 1984 from a Faridpur constituency when the former Faridpur District was split into five districts: Rajbari, Faridpur, Gopalganj, Madaripur, and Shariatpur.

== Members of Parliament ==
Election	Member	Party
1986	Akkas Ali Miah	Jatiya Party
1988	Munshi Abdul Latif	
1991	Md. Abdul Wajed Chowdhury	Awami League
1992 by-election	Kazi Keramat Ali	Awami League
February 1996	Jahanara Begum	BNP
June 1996	Kazi Keramat Ali	Awami League
2001	Ali Newaz Mahmud Khaiyam	BNP
2008	Kazi Keramat Ali	Awami League
2026	Ali Newaz Mahmud Khaiyam	BNP

== Elections ==
=== Elections in the 2010s ===
Kazi Keramat Ali was re-elected unopposed in the 2014 general election after opposition parties withdrew their candidacies in a boycott of the election.

=== Elections in the 2000s ===
General Election 2008: Rajbari-1
Party	Candidate	Votes	%	±%
AL	Kazi Keramat Ali	141,561	59.9	+16.9
BNP	Ali Newaz Mahmud Khaiyam	83,933	35.5	−12.7
Zaker Party	Md. Ali Zakir Shomsheri Dablu Molla	8,964	3.8	+3.7
BKA	Md. Habibur Rahman	1,190	0.5	N/A
BTF	Asadujjaman Shalem	346	0.1	N/A
Bangladesh Kalyan Party	SM Shariful Islam	302	0.1	N/A
Majority		57,628	24.4	+19.2
Turnout		236,296	88.5	+18.9
AL gain from BNP				

General Election 2001: Rajbari-1
Party	Candidate	Votes	%	±%
BNP	Ali Newaz Mahmud Khaiyam	95,266	48.2	+23.7
AL	Kazi Keramat Ali	85,057	43.0	+7.8
IJOF	Md. Emdadul Haq Biswas	14,843	7.5	N/A
WPB	Joyti Sankar Jhantu	1,680	0.9	N/A
Jatiya Party (M)	Iman-Ul-Karim	232	0.1	N/A
Independent	Kazi Monirul Amin	171	0.1	N/A
Zaker Party	Md. Zayedul Islam Joadder	156	0.1	+3.9
Desh Prem Party	Marshal Shah Alam	99	0.1	N/A
Bangladesh Progressive Party	Md. Raqib Uddin	75	0.0	N/A
Majority		10,209	5.2	−1.0
Turnout		197,579	69.6	−10.0
BNP gain from AL				

=== Elections in the 1990s ===
General Election June 1996: Rajbari-1
Party	Candidate	Votes	%	±%
AL	Kazi Karamat Ali	51,965	35.2	
JP(E)	Golam Mustafa	42,881	29.1	
BNP	Jahanara Begum	36,222	24.5	
Zaker Party	Md. Zayedul Islam Joadder	5,924	4.0	
Jamaat	Md. Abdur Rab Mollah	5,385	3.6	
WPB	Manjurul Alam	2,816	1.9	
BKA	Amzad Hossain Zowarder	815	0.6	
IOJ	Abdul Hannan Mollah	752	0.5	
Independent	Md. Indadul Haque Biswas	403	0.3	
FP	Md. Oliur Rahman	395	0.3	
Majority		9,084	6.2	
Turnout		147,558	79.6	
AL hold				

Md. Abdul Wajed Chowdhury died in office. Kazi Keramat Ali was elected in an October 1992 by-election.

General Election 1991: Rajbari-1
Party	Candidate	Votes	%	±%
AL	Md. Abdul Wajed Chowdhury	33,187	28.6	
BNP	A. Khalek	30,489	26.3	
JP(E)	Golam Mustafa	13,390	11.5	
Zaker Party	Akkas Ali Miah	13,088	11.3	
UCL	Ali Newaz Mahmud Khaiyam	11,776	10.1	
Jamaat	Nurul Islam	10,345	8.9	
Bangladesh Janata Party	Nazrul Haq	2,160	1.9	
JSD	Md. Monirul Haq	1,160	1.0	
Independent	Munshi Abdul Latif	187	0.2	
Independent	Kamran Hossein Chowdhury	164	0.1	
JSD (S)	Bishwanath Karmakar	84	0.1	
Majority		2,698	2.3	
Turnout		116,030	62.1	
AL gain from				
