= Rajbari Government High School =

Coordinates: 23.760°N 89.647°E

Rajbari Govt. High School
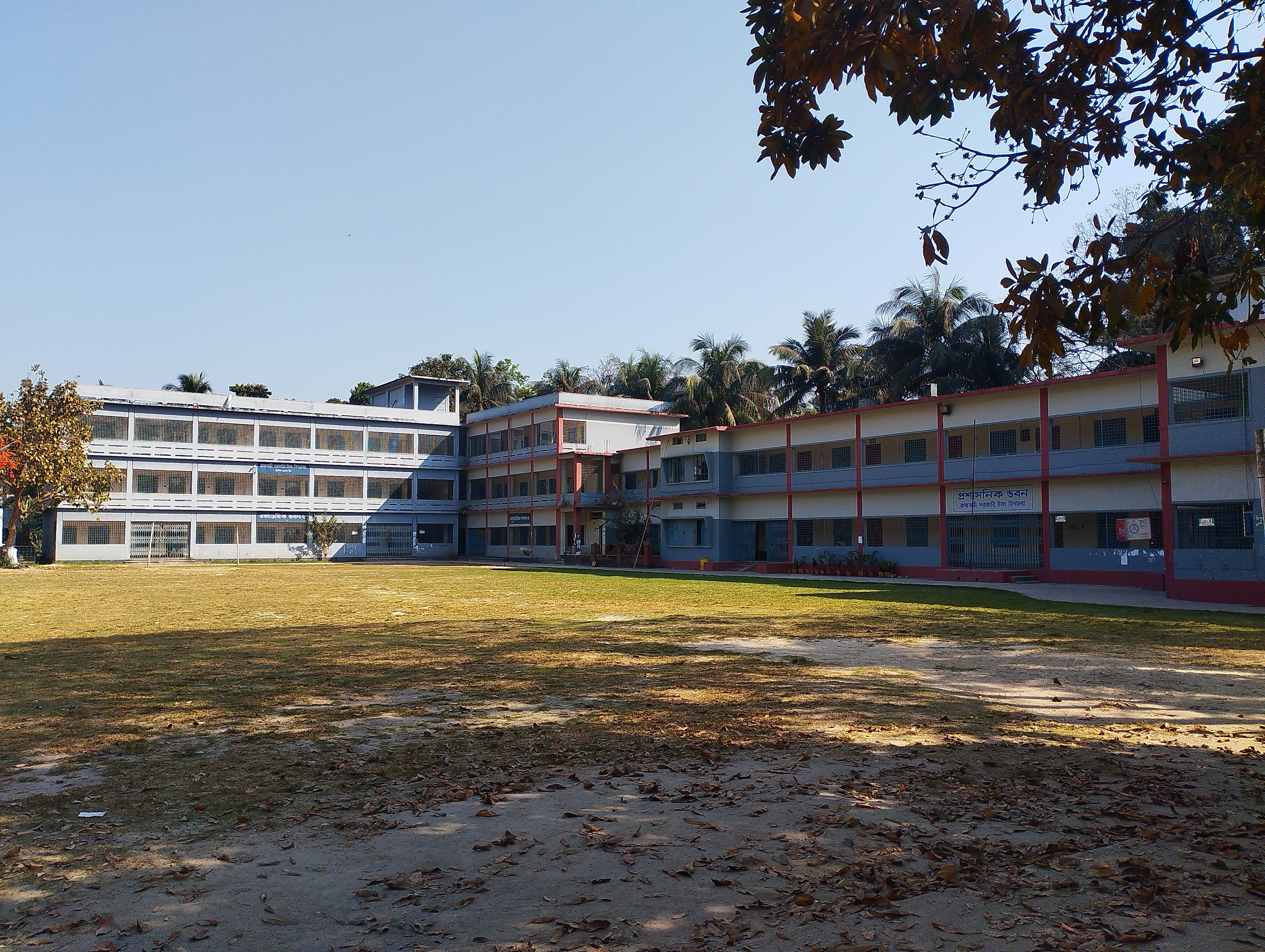
- School campus

Location
- Main Road, Rajbari; Rajbari, Dhaka; Bangladesh

Information
- Type: Government School
- Established: 1892
- Founder: Girija Shankar Mazumdar and Abhay Shankar Mazumdar (Brother's)
- Headmaster: Md. Mufazzal Husain
- Teaching staff: 43
- Education system: National Curriculum and Textbook Board
- Language: Bangla
- Campus: Rajbari
- Website: rajbarigovthighschool.edu.bd

Rajbari Government High School (Bengali: রাজবাড়ি সরকারি উচ্চ বিদ্যালয়) is a secondary school in Rajbari, Bangladesh. It was founded in 1892.
