= British Council Bangladesh =

Educational organisation

- Formation: 1951
- Headquarters: Fuller Road, Dhaka, Bangladesh
- Region served: Bangladesh
- Official language: Bengali and English
- Website: www.britishcouncil.org.bd

British Council Bangladesh is the Bangladeshi branch of the British Council that provides English and British Education and takes part in cultural exchanges. The main office is located in Fuller Road, Dhaka and branches are located in Chittagong, Sylhet. Tom Miscioscia is the Director of British Council Bangladesh.

== History ==
The British Council was founded in 1934 in London. It opened its branch in Dhaka in 1951 when Bangladesh was a part of Pakistan. On 25 March 1971, at the start of Bangladesh Liberation War, the council office was attacked by Pakistan army, killing 8 East Pakistan Police officers guarding the office. In 2013, the British Council signed a memorandum of understanding with Microsoft Bangladesh to enhance teaching and learning practices. On 16 January 2016, the British Council launched 'Innovate, Incubate and Grow (IIG): A Social Enterprise Support Programme' in collaboration with non-profit organisation Change Maker to promote entrepreneurship.

Following the July 2016 Dhaka attack, the British Council temporarily closed its offices to assess security measurements. In 2017 the council built a monument to the police officers killed on the premises in 1971.

== Functions ==
- The British Council holds O-level and A-level examinations in Bangladesh.
- Facilitating Educational links between the United Kingdom and Bangladesh.
- The British council holds IELTS examinations in Bangladesh, with 25 to 30 thousand students sitting in the examinations every year. The British Council provides the British Council IELTS Scholarships as of 2016.
- Increase and the improve the cultural ties between the United Kingdom and Bangladesh.

== Facilities ==
- British Council Library has 15,000 books and has access to 80,000 eBooks and 14,000 journals.
