= Ministry of Cultural Affairs (Bangladesh) =

Government ministry of Bangladesh

- Bengali: সংস্কৃতি বিষয়ক মন্ত্রণালয়
- Government of Bangladesh Seal

Ministry overview
- Formed: 12 January 1972; 54 years ago
- Jurisdiction: Government of Bangladesh
- Headquarters: Bangladesh Secretariat, Dhaka
- Annual budget: ৳826 crore (US$67 million) (2026-2027)
- Minister responsible: Nitai Roy Chowdhury, Minister
- Minister of State responsible: Ali Newaz Mahmud Khaiyam, Minister of State
- Ministry executives: Md. Ataur Rahman, Secretary
- Child agencies: Directorate of Archives and Libraries; Department of Public Libraries; Bangladesh Shilpakala Academy; Bangla Academy; Department of Archaeology; Nazrul Institute; National Book Centre; Bangladesh Copyright Office; Bangladesh Folk Arts and Crafts Foundation
- Website: moca.gov.bd

The Ministry of Cultural Affairs (Bengali: সংস্কৃতি বিষয়ক মন্ত্রণালয়; Sanskr̥ti biṣaẏaka mantraṇālaẏa) is a ministry of the Government of People's Republic of Bangladesh, in charge of national museums and monuments; promoting and protecting the arts (visual, plastic, theatrical, musical, dance, architectural, literary, televisual and cinematographic) in Bangladesh and managing the national archives. The Ministry of Cultural Affairs is also charged with maintaining the Bengali identity.

== Directorates ==
- Directorate of Archives and Libraries
- Department of Public Libraries
- Bangladesh Shilpakala Academy
- Bangladesh National Museum
- Bangla Academy
- Department of Archaeology (Bangladesh)
- Nazrul Institute
- National Book Centre
- Bangladesh Copyright Office
- Bangladesh Folk Arts and Crafts Foundation

== History ==
The importance of preserving and spreading culture was recognised so following Bangladesh's independence in 1971 a separate division was created within the Ministry of Education called Cultural Affairs and Sports Division on 26 May 1972. From then the new Division devoted itself to the promotion of the cultural sector of the country. Later in 1975, the Division was adjoined with Labour and Welfare Ministry. However, in the same year it was returned to the Ministry of Education. Subsequently, in 1978 it separated from the Ministry of Education and became known as the Ministry of Cultural Affairs and Sports. Then again in 1979 it was renamed the Ministry of Religious Affairs, Culture and Sports. Then, in 1980 these three sectors were divided into two different ministries: the Ministry of Religious Affairs and the Ministry of Sports & Cultural Affairs.

In 1982, under Hussain Muhammad Ershad's policy of administrative rearrangement, the ministry was converted to Sports & Culture Division and placed under the secretariat of Chief Martial Law Administrator. Next in 1983 it was transferred to President's secretariat. Afterwards in 1984 the Sport & Culture Division was transferred from President's secretariat to the Ministry of Education. In the same year sports related works were separated from Sports & Culture Division and separately made a ministry and named as Ministry of Youth & Sports. And under the Ministry of Education a separate division was made named as Cultural Affairs Division.

Under the Third Khaleda Cabinet starting in 2001, the Ministry operated under the name of Ministry of Cultural Affairs under State Minister Selima Rahman. Then in the subsequent Second Sheikh Hasina Cabinet starting in 2008, the Ministry of Cultural Affairs was run under Minister Abul Kalam Azad who was simultaneously Minister for Ministry of Information. Since the Third Sheikh Hasina Cabinet, formed in 2014, the Ministry has been operating as full-fledged Ministry, under Mr. Asaduzzaman Noor, with Md. Nasir Uddin Ahmed as the Secretary of the Ministry.

== Former ministers ==
Sl.	Name	Designation	Ministry	Start date	End date
1	Noor Mohammod Khan	Deputy Minister	Ministry Of Cultural Affairs	25-05-1988	03-10-1989
2	Zafar Imam	Minister	Ministry Of Cultural Affairs	03-10-1989	23-12-1989
3	Syed Didad Bokt	Minister of State	Ministry Of Cultural Affairs	23-12-1989	06-12-1990
4	Alamgir M A Kabir	Adviser	Ministry Of Cultural Affairs	19-12-1990	19-12-1990
5	Prof. Iajuddin Ahmed	Adviser	Ministry Of Cultural Affairs	19-12-1990	15-03-1991
6	Dr. AQM Badruddoza Chowdhury	Minister	Ministry Of Cultural Affairs	27-03-1991	19-09-1991
7	Prof. Jahanara Begum	Minister of State	Ministry Of Cultural Affairs	19-09-1991	19-03-1996
8	Prof. Jahanara Begum	Minister of State	Ministry Of Cultural Affairs	19-03-1996	30-03-1996
9	Prof. Md. Samsul Hoque	Adviser	Ministry Of Cultural Affairs	03-04-1996	23-06-1996
10	Obaidul Quader	Minister of State	Ministry Of Cultural Affairs	23-06-1996	15-07-2001
11	Rokeya Afjal Rahman	Adviser	Ministry Of Cultural Affairs	16-07-2001	10-10-2001
12	Selima Rahman	Minister of State	Ministry Of Cultural Affairs	11-10-2001	29-10-2006
13	C. M. Shafi Sami	Adviser	Ministry Of Cultural Affairs	01-11-2006	12-12-2006
14	Sofiqul Hoque Chowdhury	Adviser	Ministry Of Cultural Affairs	12-12-2006	11-01-2007
15	Ayub Kadri	Adviser	Ministry Of Cultural Affairs	17-01-2007	27-12-2007
16	Rasheda K Chowdhury	Adviser	Ministry Of Cultural Affairs	21-01-2008	06-01-2009
17	Abul Kalam Azad	Minister	Ministry Of Cultural Affairs	06-01-2009	21-12-2013
18	Promod Mankin	Minister of State	Ministry Of Cultural Affairs	31-07-2009	14-09-2012
19	Hasanul Hoque Inu	Minister	Ministry Of Cultural Affairs	21-12-2013	12-01-2014
20	Asaduzzaman Noor	Minister	Ministry Of Cultural Affairs	13-01-2014	07-01-2019
21	K M Khalid	Minister of State	Ministry of Cultural Affairs	07-01-2019	10-01-2024
22	Naheed Ezaher Khan	Minister of State	Ministry of Cultural Affairs	01-03-2024	06-08-2024
23	Asif Nazrul	Adviser	Ministry of Cultural Affairs	16-08-2024	11-10-2024
24	Mostofa Sarwar Farooki	Adviser	Ministry of Cultural Affairs	11-10-2024	present
