= National Library of Bangladesh =

- বাংলাদেশ জাতীয় গ্রন্থাগার
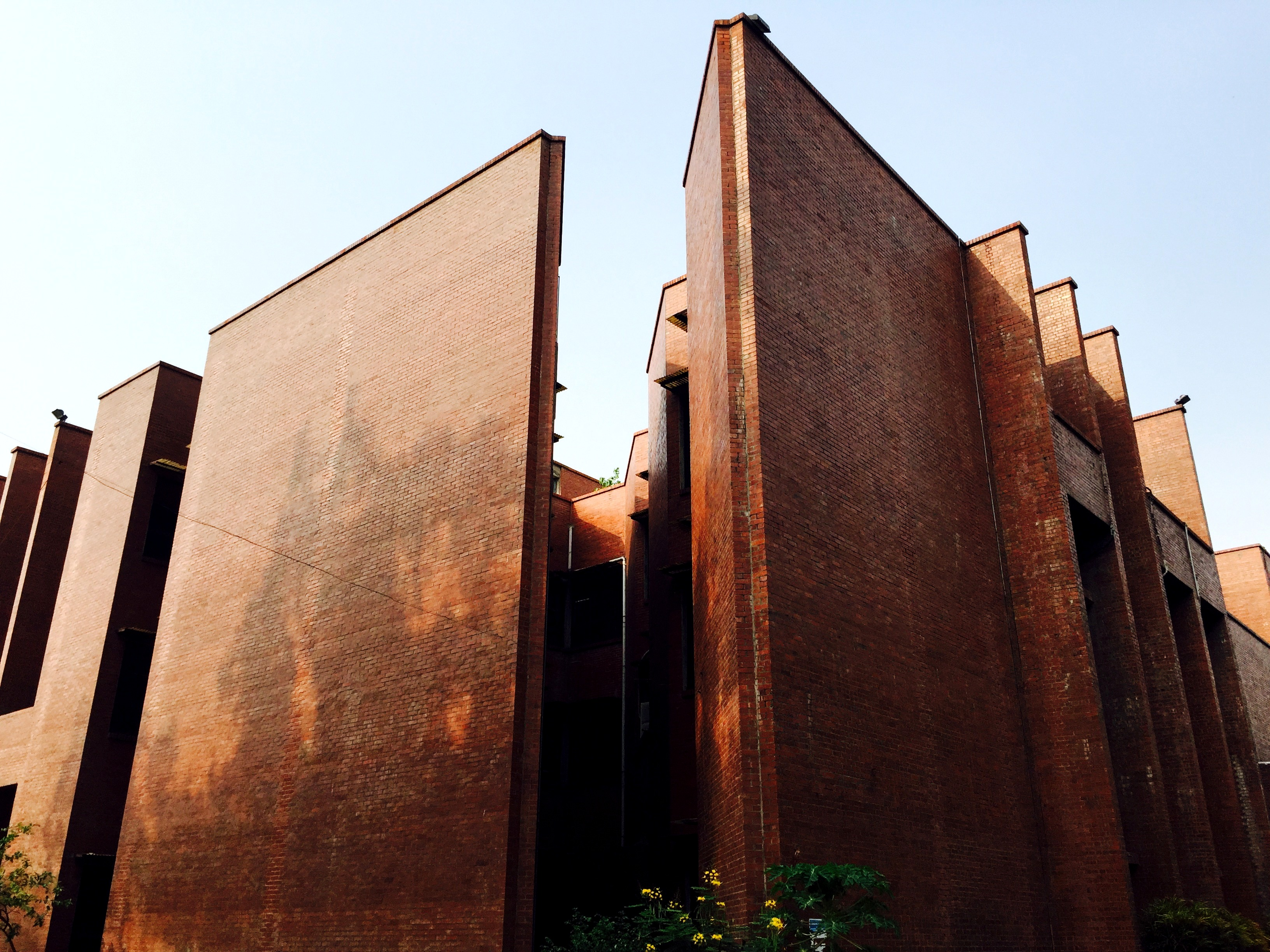
- 23.7759°N 90.3740°E
- Location: Justice S.M. Murshed Sarani, Agargaon, Sher-e-Bangla Nagor, Dhaka
- Established: 1973 (52 years ago)
- Architect: Muzharul Islam

Collection
- Size: 500,000 total books 200,000 processed books

Access and use
- Members: 8,200

Other information
- Budget: 18,200,000 BDT (1 crore and 82 lac)
- Director: Wadudul Bari Chowdhury (1990); K.M. Karim (1972)
- Employees: 98
- Website: nlb.gov.bd

The National Library of Bangladesh (NLB; Bengali: বাংলাদেশ জাতীয় গ্রন্থাগার, romanized: Baṅladeś Jatiẏō Grōnthagar) is the legal depository of all new books and other printed materials published in Bangladesh under the copyright law of Bangladesh. It was founded in 1973, but it traces its origins back to 1967, before the Bangladesh Liberation War and its independence. It is open to the public and has both Bengali and English language books. It is housed in the National Library Bhaban.

== History ==
After the partition of the subcontinent in 1947, the government of Pakistan established the National Library of Pakistan in Karachi in 1962 and a provincial book deposit branch of the Pakistan National Library in Dhaka in 1967.

After the liberation war of Bangladesh, it was keenly felt by all quarters that a national library is indispensable for the newborn nation. Considering the necessity and importance, the government resolved to set up the National Library of Bangladesh in Dhaka. The library first started functioning with the manpower, resources and materials inherited from the Provincial Book Deposit Branch. In fact, that book deposit branch was the embryo of the National Library of Bangladesh coming into being in 1973. It was placed under the administration of Directorate of Archives and Libraries along with the National Archives. The directorate is under the Ministry of Cultural Affairs The government of Bangladesh provided the library with air conditioning in 1978, under the government's five-year plan. In 2008 the library was without electricity for about a month because of the Dhaka Electric Supply Company and the Public Works Department refused to fix it. It has faced criticism for not having an online catalogue.
