= Rajwar =

Rajwar may refer to:

- Rajwar, a Raji-Raute language
- Sunita Rajwar (born 1969), Indian actress
- Rajuar, a Scheduled Tribe of Odisha, India and a caste in other states

== See also ==
- Rajbari (disambiguation)
- Rājwār, another name for the historical Rajputana region of India
- Rajwara, a village in Nepal
