= Pritom Ahmed =

Bangladeshi singer-songwriter

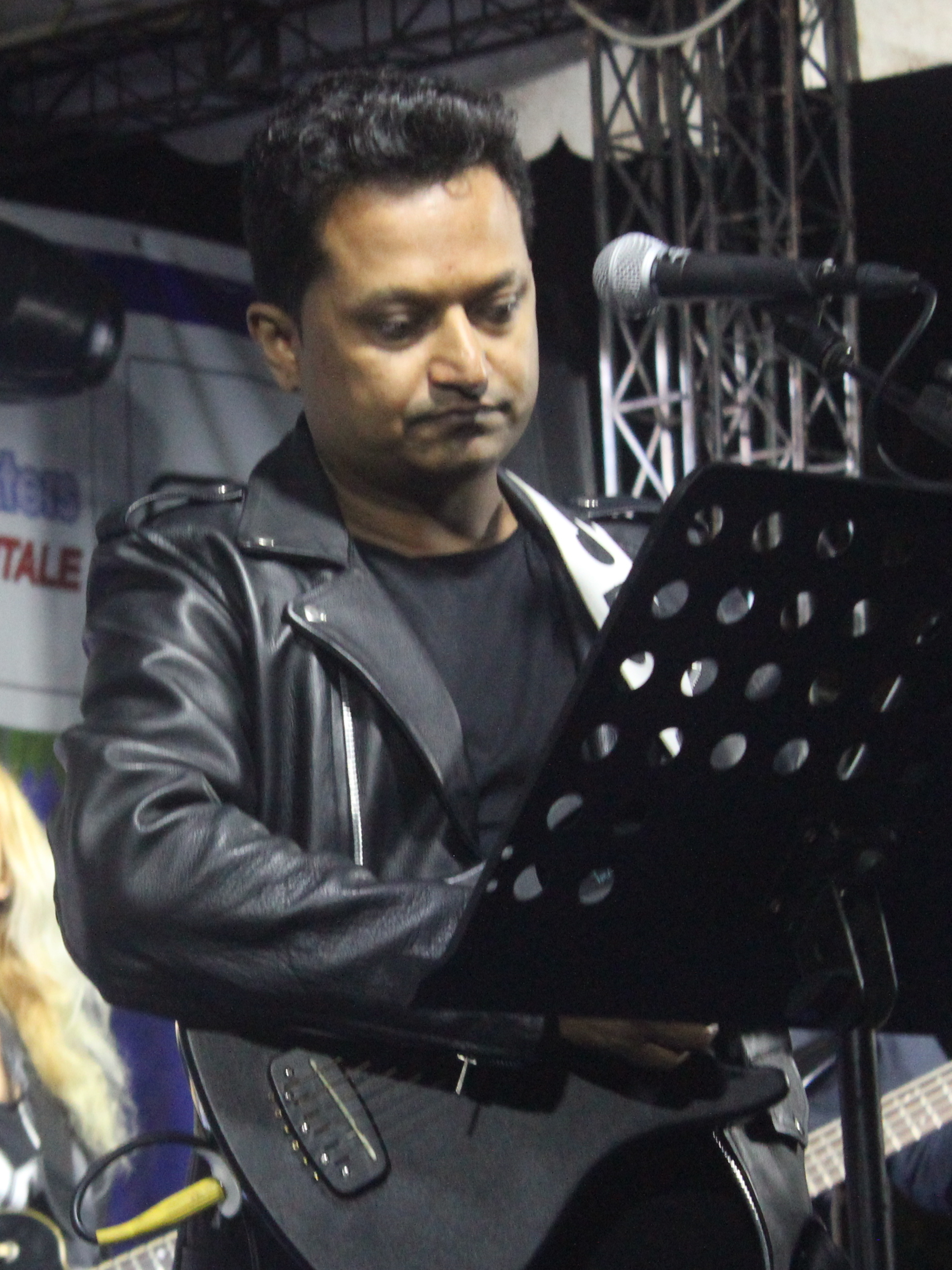

Background information
- Also known as: Pritom
- Born: Pritom Ahmed; 24 April
- Origin: Dhaka, Bangladesh
- Occupations: Singer-songwriter, record producer and actor
- Instruments: Vocal, keyboards, guitar
- Years active: 1999–present
- Labels: Laser Vision, CMV, GAANWALA

Pritom Ahmed is a Bangladeshi-British singer-songwriter, actor and music composer. In Bangladesh he is the only singer with 13 solo albums of his own lyrics and composition. His music focuses on class stratification, contemporary urban life, socio-economic, 2013 Shahbag protests and human rights of Bangladesh.

Ahmed has had several acting roles in British and Hollywood productions, including featured roles in The Crown and A Very British Scandal.

Currently Ahmed has taken up a role teaching Media Studies at secondary level in the UK

== Notable Songs ==
His famous songs are Balika, Red Rose, Bhalo Theko, Bhaiya, Cholo Palai, Vote for Thot, Emon Keno, Shongshar, Ghor, Cholo Ekshathe Buro hoi, Separation, Pashanpurir Golpo, Dukkho Shari Shari, and many more.

== Albums ==
=== Solo album ===
Year	Title	References
2002	Dui Inchee Shukh Chai	
2004	Cholo Palai	
2006	Bhalobashar Michile Esho	
2006	Hello Bondhu	
2007	Slogaan	
2008	Tui Ki Amar Bondhu Hobi	
2009	Street Singer	
2013	Shahbag Calling Abar Ekattor	
2014	Bhalo Theko	
2014	Vote For Thot	
2015	Bhaiya	
2017	Copy Paste	
2020	Soulmate	

=== Mixed album ===
Year	Title	References
1999	Jiboner joto chawa	
1999	Onamika tumi	
2004	Dour	

=== Video album ===
Year	Title	References
2004	Cholo palai	
2006	Balika	
2006	BHAIYA	

=== Filmography ===
Year	Title	Co-Star	Director	Note
2009	Street Singer	Rosey Siddiqui	Farhad Hossain	Telefilm
2019	Obosheshe Bhalobeshe	Rafiath Rashid Mithila	Farhad Ahmed	Drama
2019	Helmet	Nusrat Imroz Tisha	Abu Hayat Mahmud	Drama
