= Rajbari, Bangladesh =

Rajbari
- Town
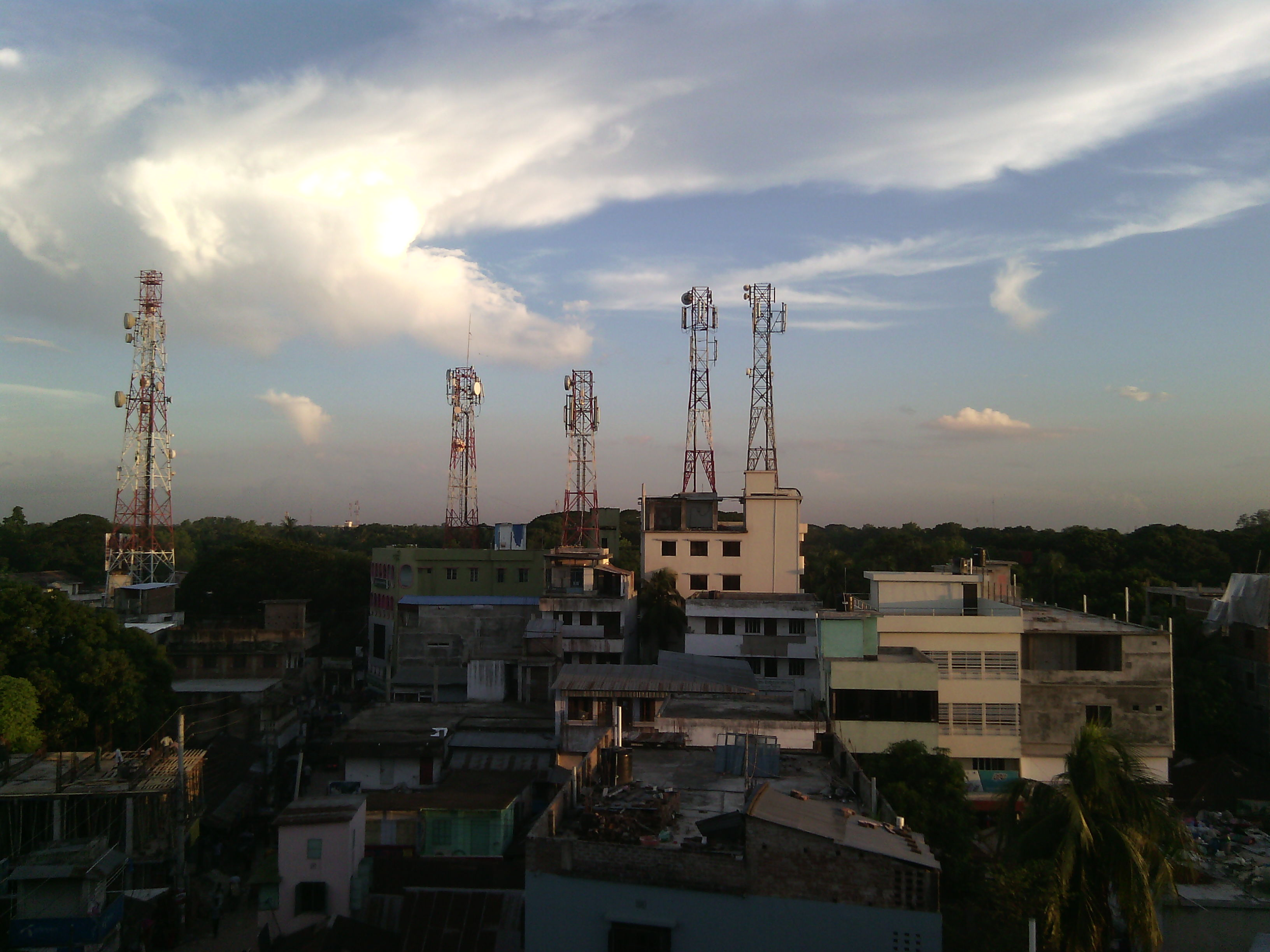
- Captured from central Rajbari

- Location in Bangladesh Rajbari (Bangladesh)
- Coordinates: 23°45′N 89°38′E
- Country: Bangladesh
- Division: Dhaka
- District: Rajbari
- Upazila: Rajbari Sadar

Population (2011)
  - Total: 56,313
- Time zone: UTC+6 (BST)
- Website: pourashava.rajbari.gov.bd

Rajbari is a town in Dhaka Division in central Bangladesh. It is the headquarters of Rajbari District.

== Demographics ==
Religions in Rajbari (2011)
Religion	Percent
Islam	84.85%
Hinduism	15.01%
Other or not stated	0.14%

In 2011, Rajbari city has 12,657 households and a population of 56,313. 9,996 (17.75%) were under 10 years of age. Rajbari has a sex ratio of 992 females per 1000 males and a literacy rate of 74.30%.
