= Kazi Keramat Ali =

Bangladeshi politician (born 1954)

- কাজী কেরামত আলী
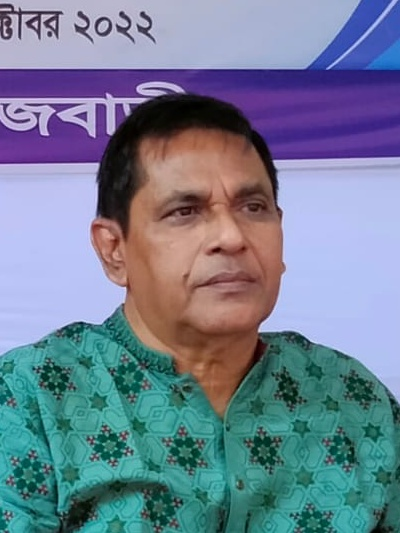
- Ali in 2022

Minister of State for Education
- In office 3 January 2018 – 7 January 2019
- Prime Minister: Sheikh Hasina
- Minister: Nurul Islam Nahid
- Succeeded by: Shamshun Nahar Chapa

Member of the Bangladesh Parliament for Rajbari-1
- In office 25 January 2009 – 6 August 2024
- Preceded by: Ali Newaz Mahmud Khaiyam
- Succeeded by: Ali Newaz Mahmud Khaiyam
- In office 14 July 1996 – 13 July 2001
- Preceded by: Jahanara Begum
- In office 30 October 1992 – 24 November 1995
- Preceded by: Md. Abdul Wajed Chowdhury

Personal details
- Born: 22 April 1954 (age 71)
- Party: Bangladesh Awami League
- Parent: Kazi Hedayet Hossain (father)

Kazi Keramat Ali (born 22 April 1954) is a Bangladeshi politician. He is a former State Minister for Technical and Madrasa Education from January 2018 until January 2019. He is a former Jatiya Sangsad member representing the Rajbari-1 constituency from 2008 until 2024.

== Background and career ==
In 1991, Ali became the General Secretary of the Bangladesh Awami League’s Rajbari District Unit. The next year, he was elected as a member of Jatiya Sangsad. He has been elected for 5th time at the current term.
