= Rajbari Sadar Upazila =

Rajbari রাজবাড়ী সদর
- Upazila
- Rajbari Sadar
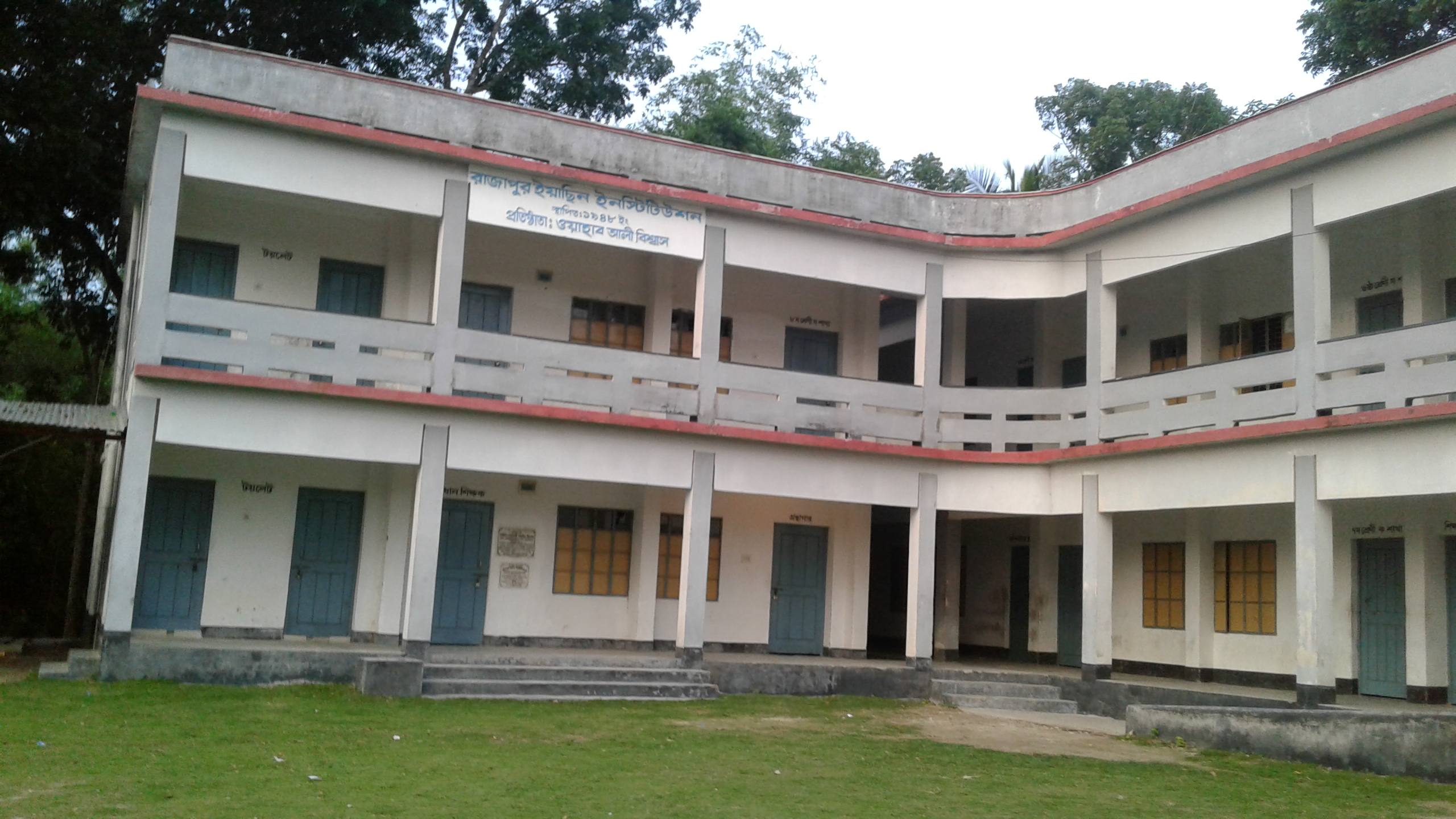
- Rajapur Yasin Institution, Rajbari Sadar

- Coordinates: 23°45.3′N 89°39′E
- Country: Bangladesh
- Division: Dhaka
- District: Rajbari
- Headquarters: Rajbari

Area
  - Total: 322.34 km^{2} (124.46 sq mi)

Population (2022)
  - Total: 384,534
  - Density: 1,192.9/km^{2} (3,089.7/sq mi)
- Time zone: UTC+6 (BST)
- Postal code: 7700
- Area code: 0641
- Website: sadar.rajbari.gov.bd

Rajbari Sadar Upazila mauza geocode map

Rajbari Sadar (Bengali: রাজবাড়ী সদর) is an upazila of Rajbari District in the Division of Dhaka, Bangladesh. It has its headquarters in the town of Rajbari.

== Geography ==
Rajbari Sadar is located at 23.7542°N 89.6500°E. It has a total area of 322.34 km^{2}.

== Demographics ==
Religions in Rajbari Sadar Upazila (2022)
Religion	Percent
Islam	92.15%
Hinduism	7.78%
Other or not stated	0.07%

According to the 2022 Bangladeshi census, Rajbari Sadar Upazila had 96,163 households and a population of 384,534. 8.94% of the population were under 5 years of age. Rajbari Sadar had a literacy rate (age 7 and over) of 73.15%: 75.01% for males and 71.41% for females, and a sex ratio of 94.96 males for every 100 females. 86,582 (22.52%) lived in urban areas.

As of the 2011 Census of Bangladesh, Rajbari Sadar upazila had 75,910 households and a population of 331,631. 70,885 (21.37%) were under 10 years of age. Rajbari Sadar had an average literacy rate of 57.7%, compared to the national average of 51.8%, and a sex ratio of 1041 females per 1000 males. 58,783 (17.73%) of the population lived in urban areas.

As of the 1991 Bangladesh census, Rajbari Sadar has a population of 263,555. Males constitute 51.46% of the population, and females 48.54%. This Upazila's eighteen up population is 133,985. Rajbari Sadar has an average literacy rate of 32.3% (7+ years), and the national average of 32.4% literate.

== Administration ==
Rajbari Sadar Upazila is divided into Rajbari Municipality and 14 union parishads: Alipur, Banibaha, Barat, Basantapur, Chandani, Dadshi, Khankhanapur, Khanganj, Mizanpur, Mulghar, Panchuria, Ramkantapur, Shahid Wahabpur, and Sultanpur. The union parishads are subdivided into 200 mauzas and 209 villages.

Rajbari Municipality is subdivided into 9 wards and 31 mahallas.

== Education ==
There are five colleges in the upazila: Belgachi Bikalpa College, Bir Muktijoddha Morji Delowara College, Dr. Abul Hossain Degree College, Government Adarsha Mohila College Rajbari, and Rajbari Government College.

According to Banglapedia, Raja Surja Kumar Institute, founded in 1888, Rajbari Government High School (1892), and Yeasin High School (1950), Sher-e-bangla Girls High School (1972) are notable secondary schools.

== See also ==
- Upazilas of Bangladesh
- Districts of Bangladesh
- Divisions of Bangladesh
