= Department of Public Libraries =

Bangladesh government department

- Formation: 1983
- Headquarters: Dhaka, Bangladesh
- Region served: Bangladesh
- Official language: Bengali
- Website: www.publiclibrary.gov.bd

Department of Public Libraries is a government department under the Ministry of Cultural Affairs of the Government of Bangladesh. It is responsible for government owned public libraries in Bangladesh and is located in Dhaka, Bangladesh.

== History ==
Department of Public Libraries traces its origins to the Public Library in the Dhaka University campus which was established on 22 March 1958 by the government of Pakistan. The Public Library was shifted to its present building in 1977 and opened in 1978. The Government of Bangladesh established a network of public libraries down to every district and the department of Public Libraries was established in 1983 to manage them. In 2010, the department exchanged material on Bangladesh War of Independence with the National Library of India.

== Public libraries in Bangladesh ==
The Department of Public Libraries are responsible for 64 government public libraries, with one in every district of Bangladesh. The National Public Library, called the Sufia Kamal National Public Library is based in Dhaka's Shahbag and is the largest public library in Bangladesh. It houses the central administration of the Department of Public Libraries. There are also Divisional public libraries in Sylhet, Chittagong, Khulna and Rangpur. All other districts contain a Govt. District Public Library, usually located in the district capital.

== Libraries Unlimited ==
In August 2016, a memorandum of understanding (MoU) was signed between the Ministry of Cultural Affairs and the British Council Bangladesh formalising a partnership in which the British Council would work with the Department of Public Libraries to modernise the public library sector in Bangladesh. The project, called Libraries Unlimited, is funded by the Bill & Melinda Gates Foundation and managed by the British Council Bangladesh with a stated aim of "Opening access to information and knowledge for all in Bangladesh". The project is on-going and is scheduled to run until the end of 2020.
