= R713 (Bangladesh) =

Road in Bangladesh

R713
- Rabindra Kuthibari Road; Kuthibari Road

Route information
- Length: 5.435 km (3.377 mi)

Major junctions
- South end: R710 (Alauddin Nagar) in Kumarkhali
- North end: Shilaidaha (Shilaidaha Rabindra Kuthibari)

Location
- Country: Bangladesh

Highway system
- Roads in Bangladesh
← R710

Rabindra Kuthibari Road on R713 (Bangladesh) is a regional highway used to reach Shilaidaha Rabindra Kuthibari. The road starts from Alauddin Nagar in Kumarkhali Upazila of Kushtia District and ends at Shilaidaha Rabindra Kuthibari. This is the main town to go Shilaidaha. The road is also known as Kuthibari Road.
