= Shilaidaha =

Village in Kushtia District, Bangladesh

Coordinates: 23.9199°N 89.2200°E

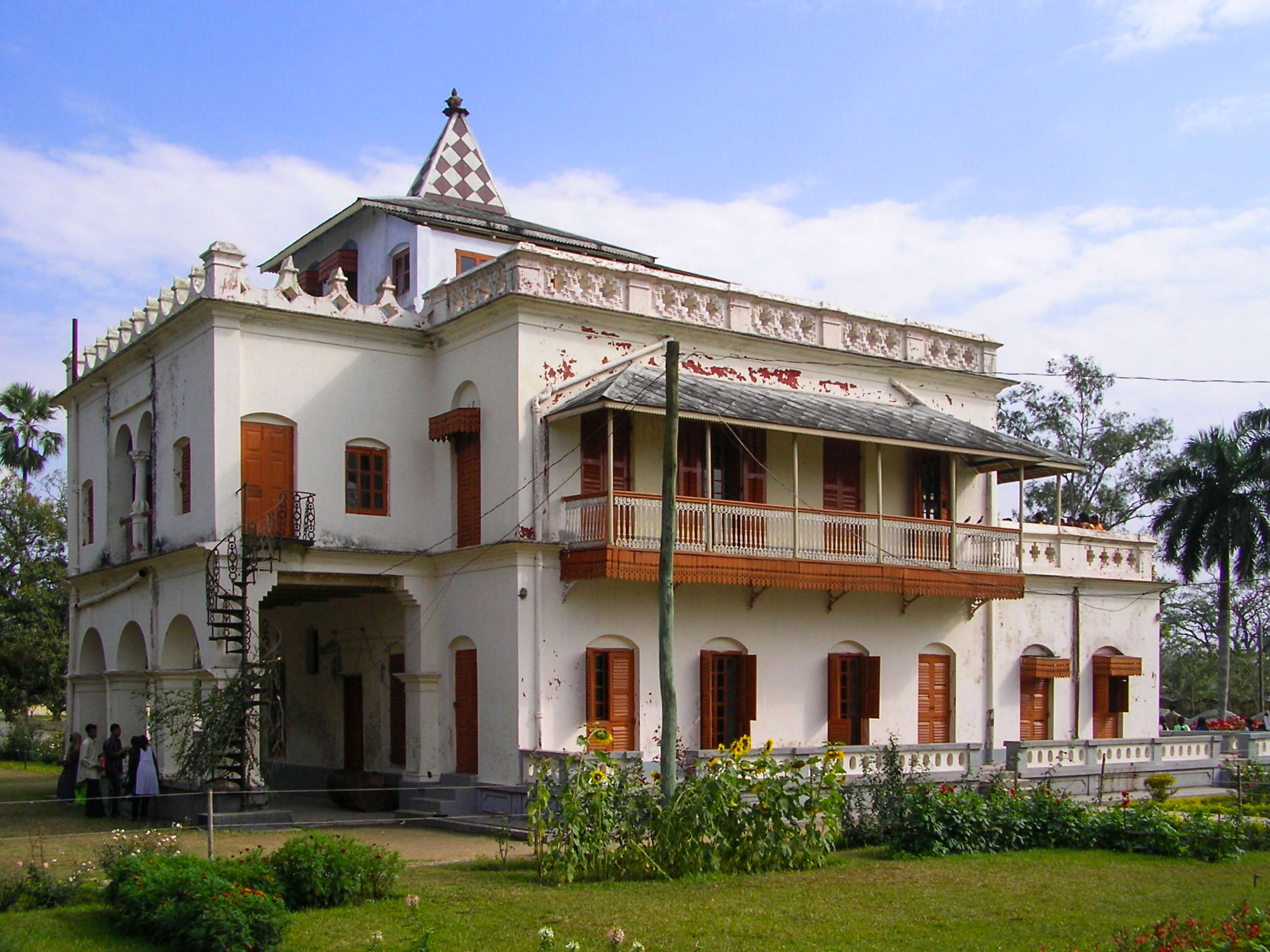
Front view of Shilaidaha Kuthibari, a tourist attraction.

Shilaidaha (Bengali: শিলাইদহ) is a village in Shilaidaha Union, Kumarkhali Upazila of Kushtia District in Bangladesh. The place is famous for Shilaidaha Kuthibari; a country house built by Dwarkanath Tagore. Nobel laureate Rabindranath Tagore lived a part of his life here and created some of his memorable poems while living here.

== History ==
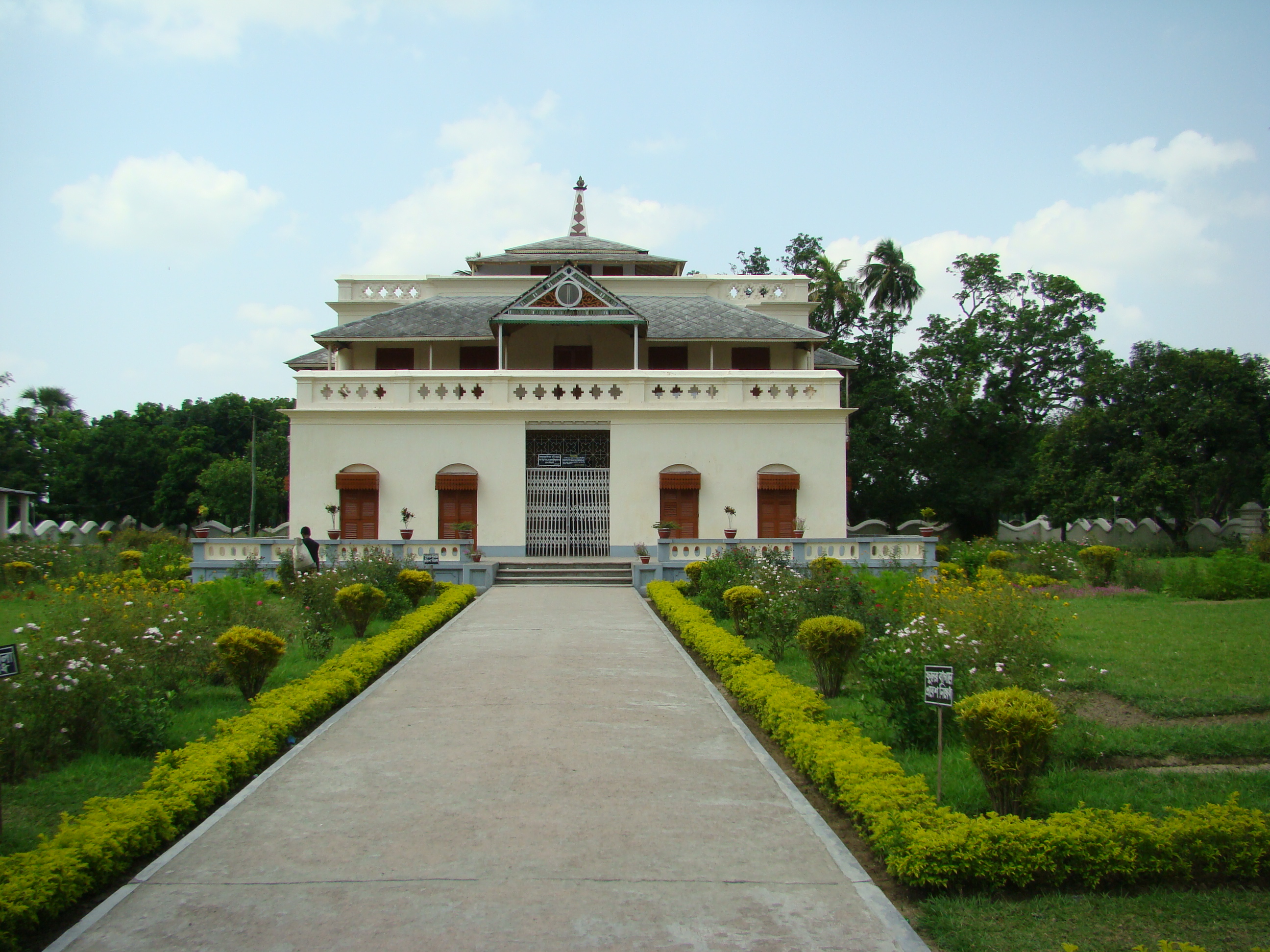
Shilaidaha Kuthibadi

The village was formerly known as Khorshedpur. During the reign of British East India Company, an indigo-planter named Shelly built a house in this village, later people started to call the village Shellydaha and the named changed to Shelaidaha. In 1807, Dwarkanath Tagore bought the village and made it his estate. He also bought the building (kuthi) as well. His grandson Rabindranath Tagore came to the village many times. Now the village is widely known for Shilaidaha Rabindra Kuthibari.

== Literature ==
During his stay Rabindranath Tagore wrote many of his famous poems, essays and short stories there. Among those some of the masterpieces are Sonar Tari, Katha o Kahini, Chitra, Chaitali, etc. He also translated many of his creations in English there. He also wrote most of the poems from Naibedya, Kheya and many of the songs from Gitanjali and Geetimalya. It was here, in Shelaidaha in 1912, that he started translating his Gitanjali into English, which earned him the Nobel Prize for literature in 1913.

== Museum ==
The reformation of Kuthi Bari has been completed under the Department of Archaeology, Ministry of Cultural Affairs. It now serves as a museum named 'Tagore Memorial Museum'. Many of the objects Tagore used are displayed here, such as his bed, wardrobe, iron chest, lawnmower, framed pictures, and last but not least his houseboat.

== Festivals ==
Several festivals are observed throughout the year in Kuthi Bari such as 25th Baishakh as Tagore's birth anniversary. It is a five-day-long festival. People from across the country as well as India and the rest of the world join this occasion to celebrate his birthday. The program includes discussion, cultural program, fair and staging of his plays.

== Gallery ==
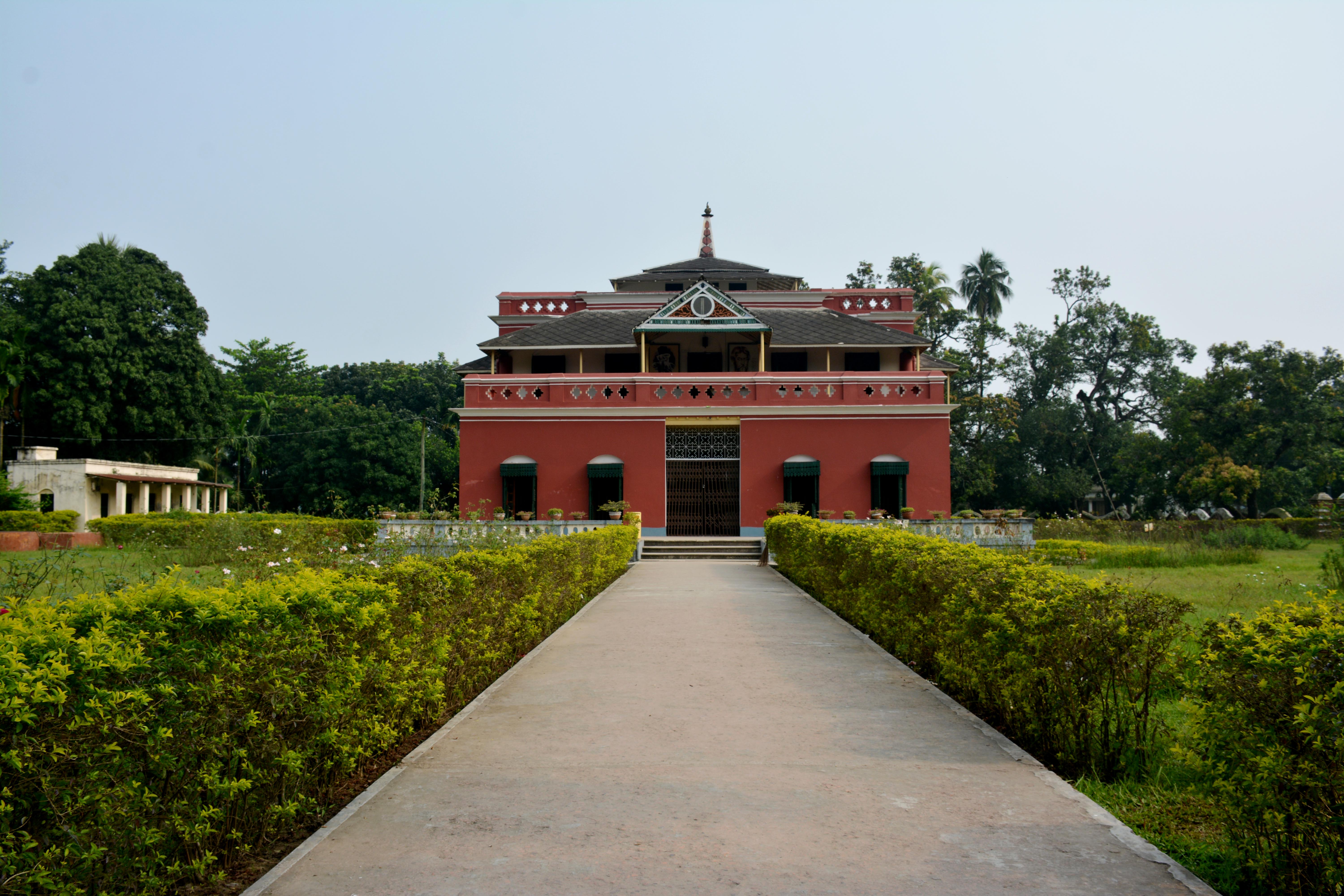
Shilaidaha Kuthibadi in 2015

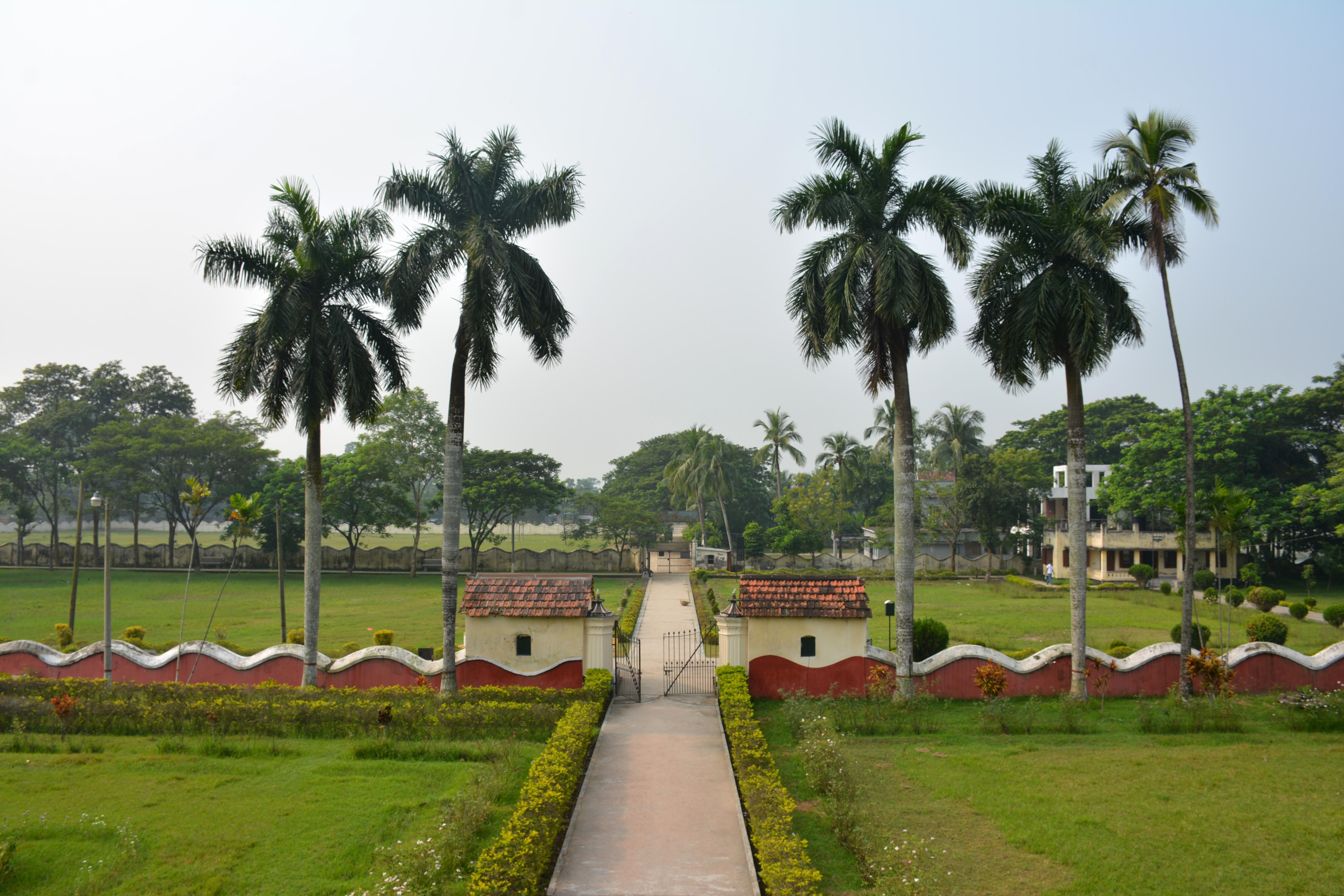
Shilaidaha Kuthibadi Complex in 2015

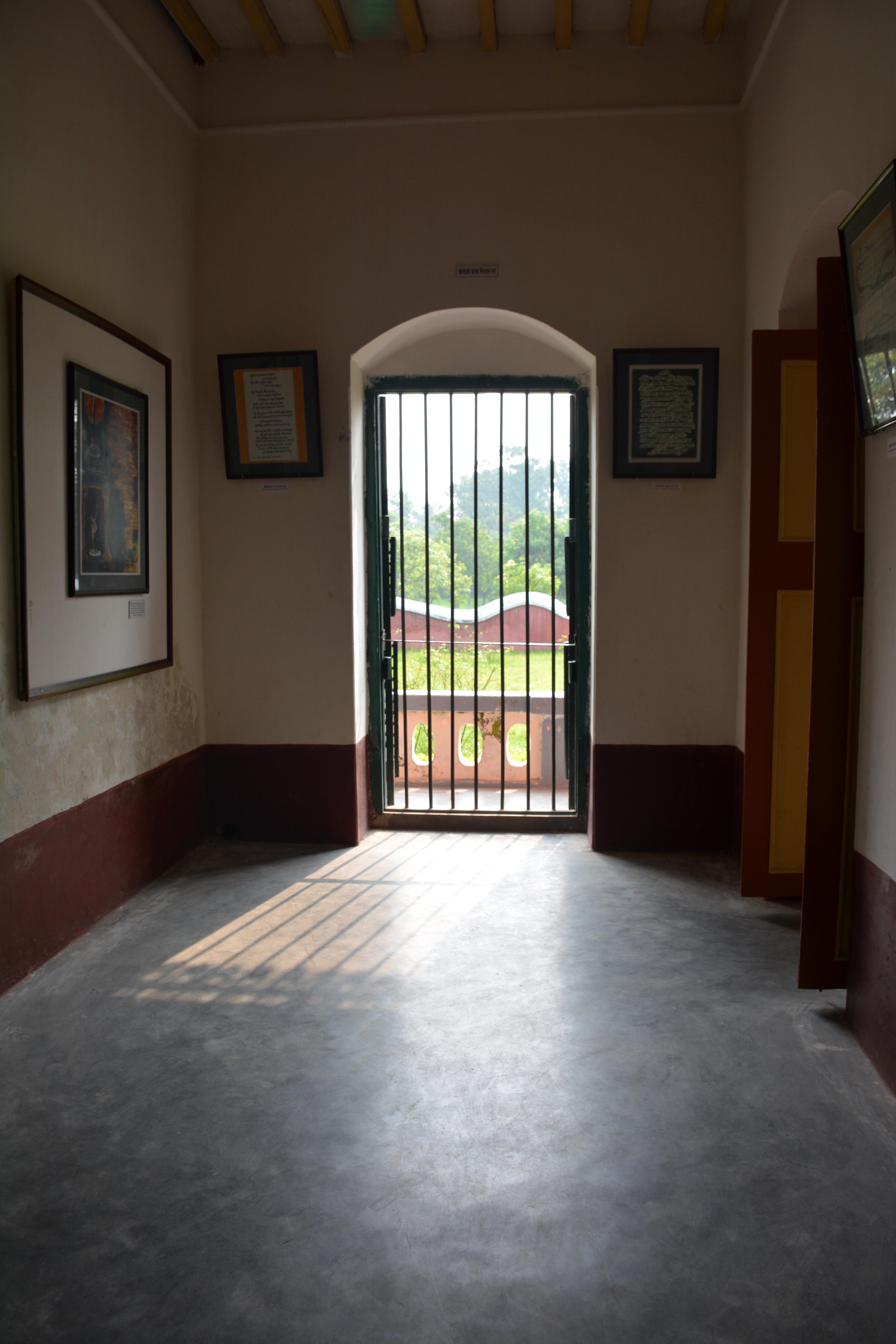
Inside of Shilaidaha Kuthibadi in 2015

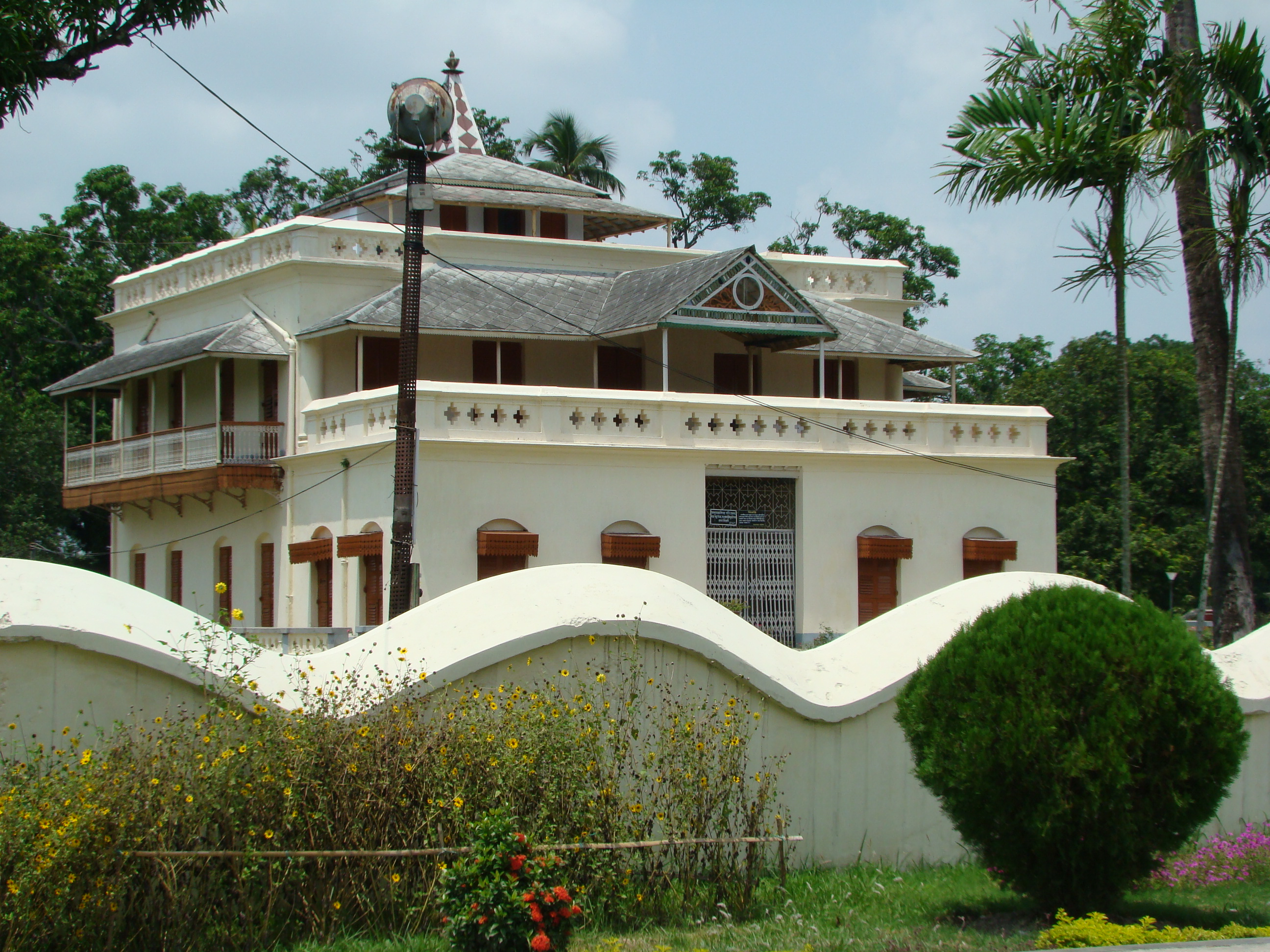
Shilaidaha Kuthibadi in 2008

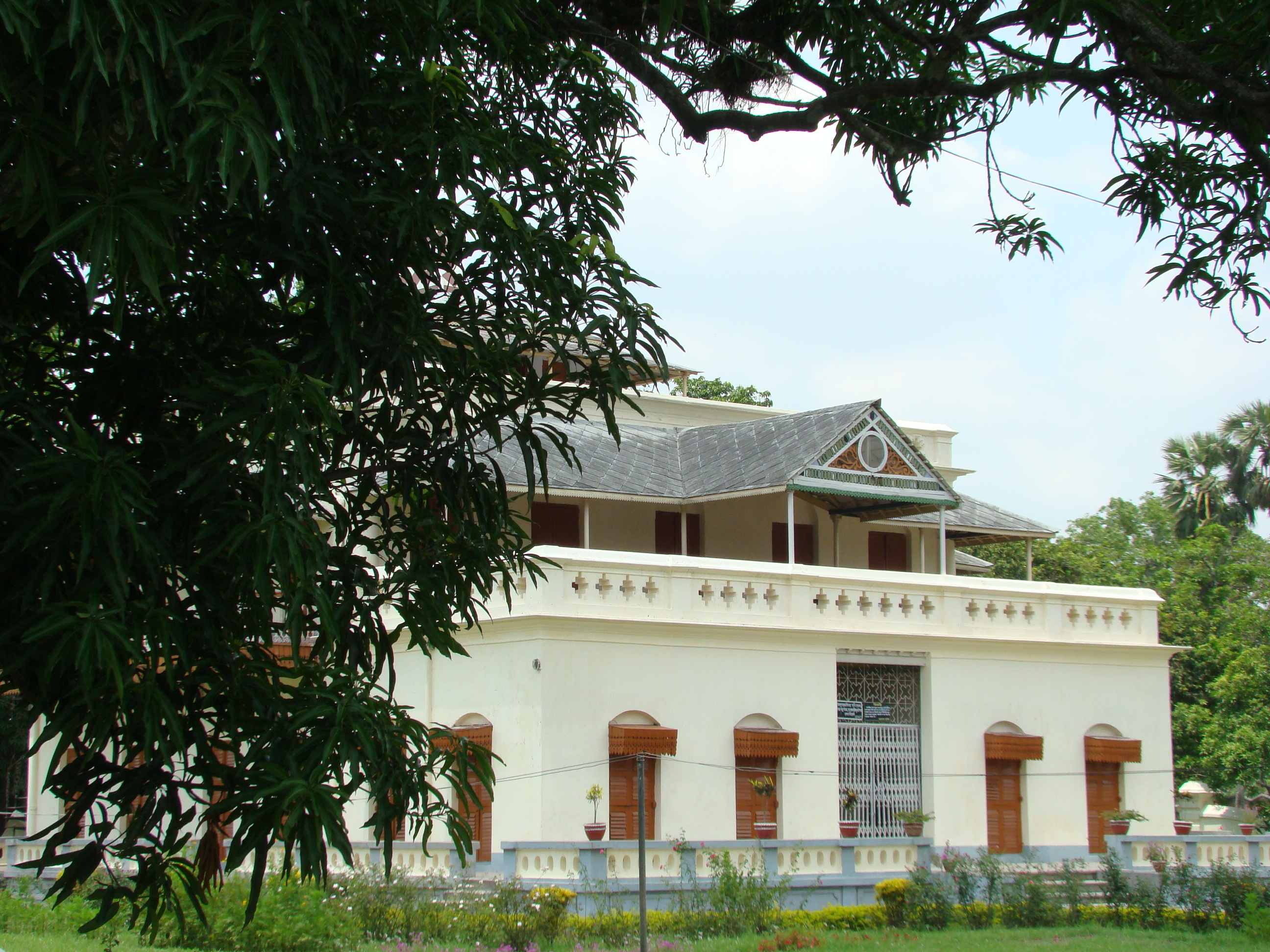
Shilaidaha Kuthibadi 2008

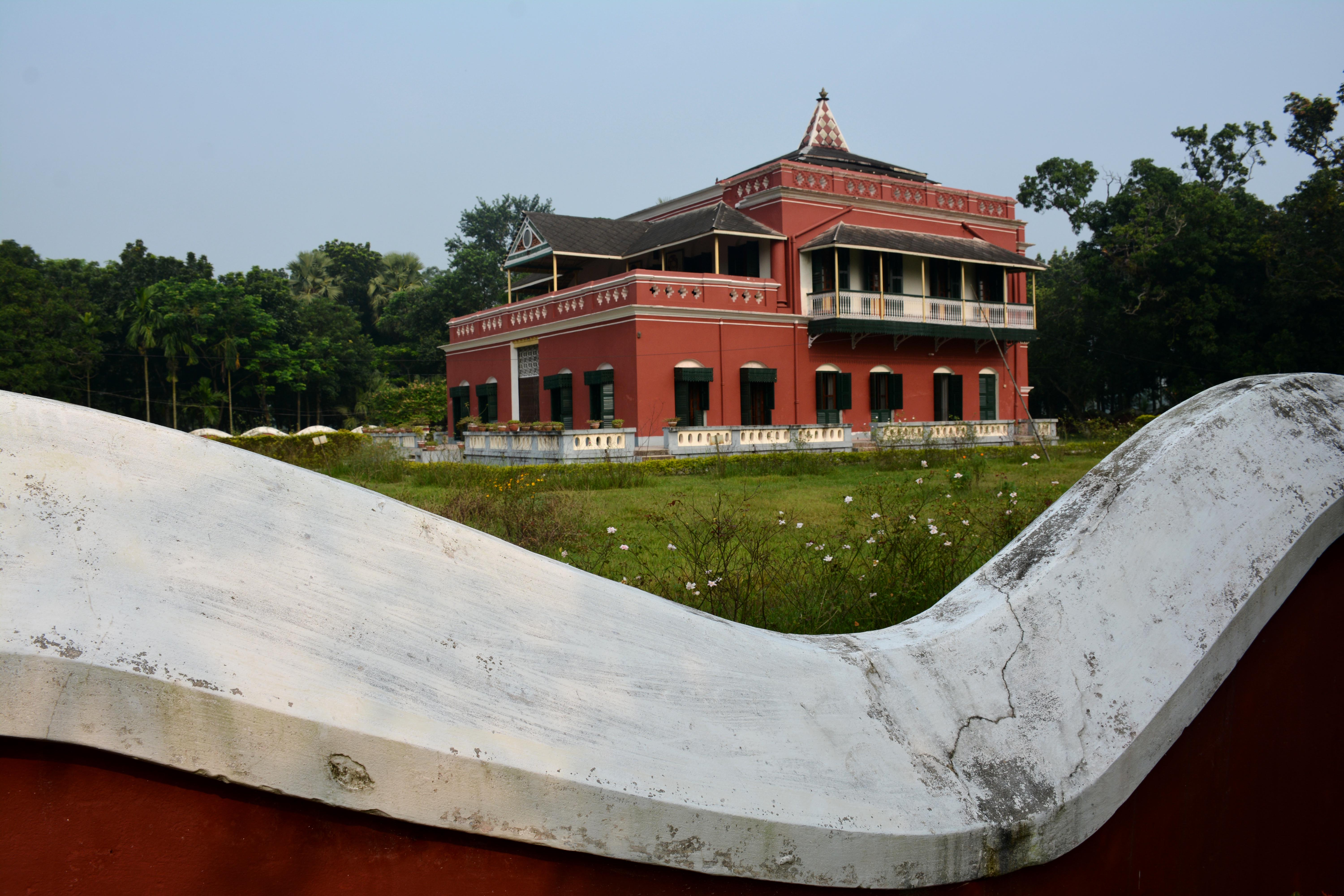
Another View of Shilaidaha Kuthibadi (2015)

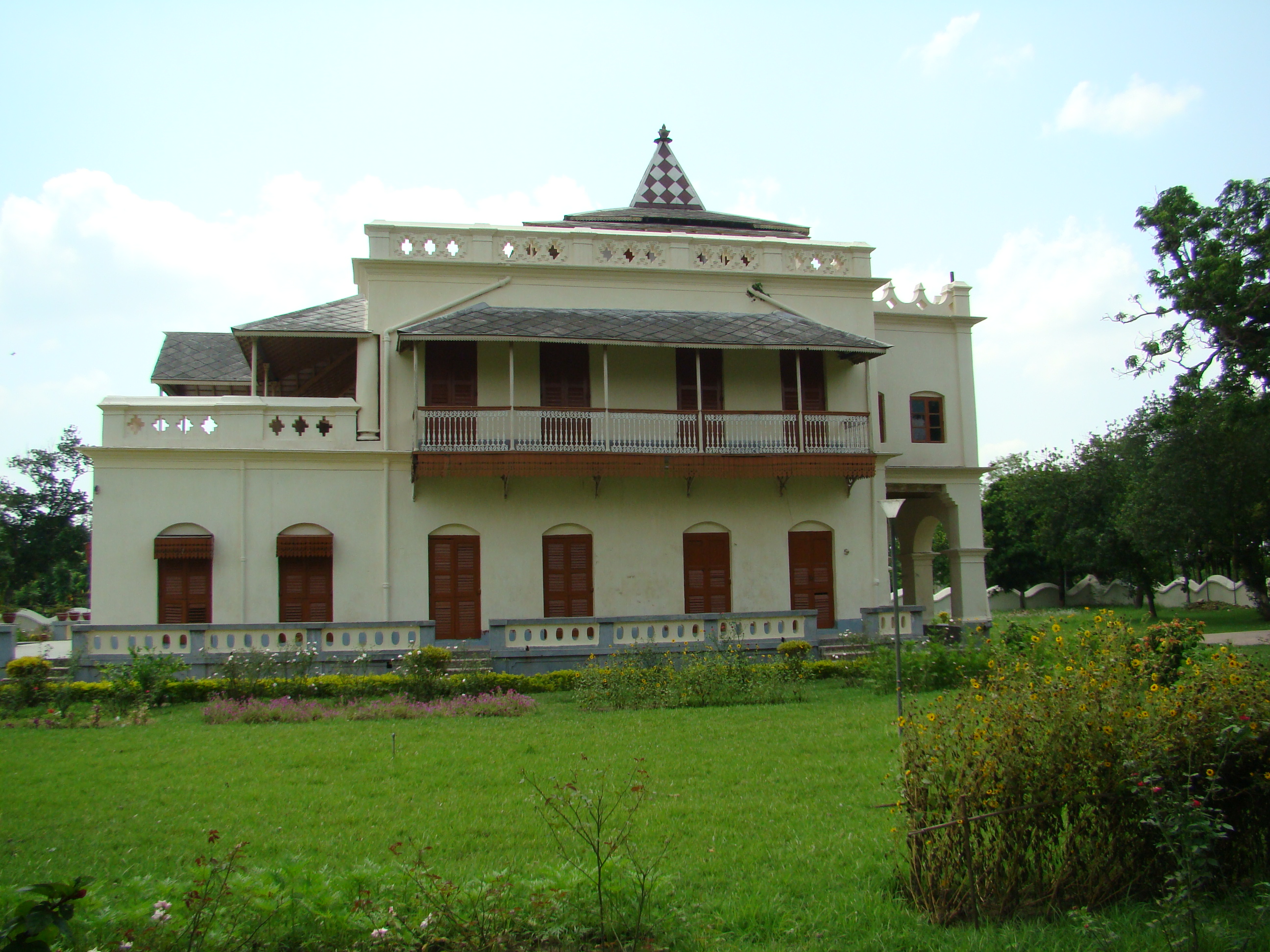
Shilaidaha Kuthibadi in 2008

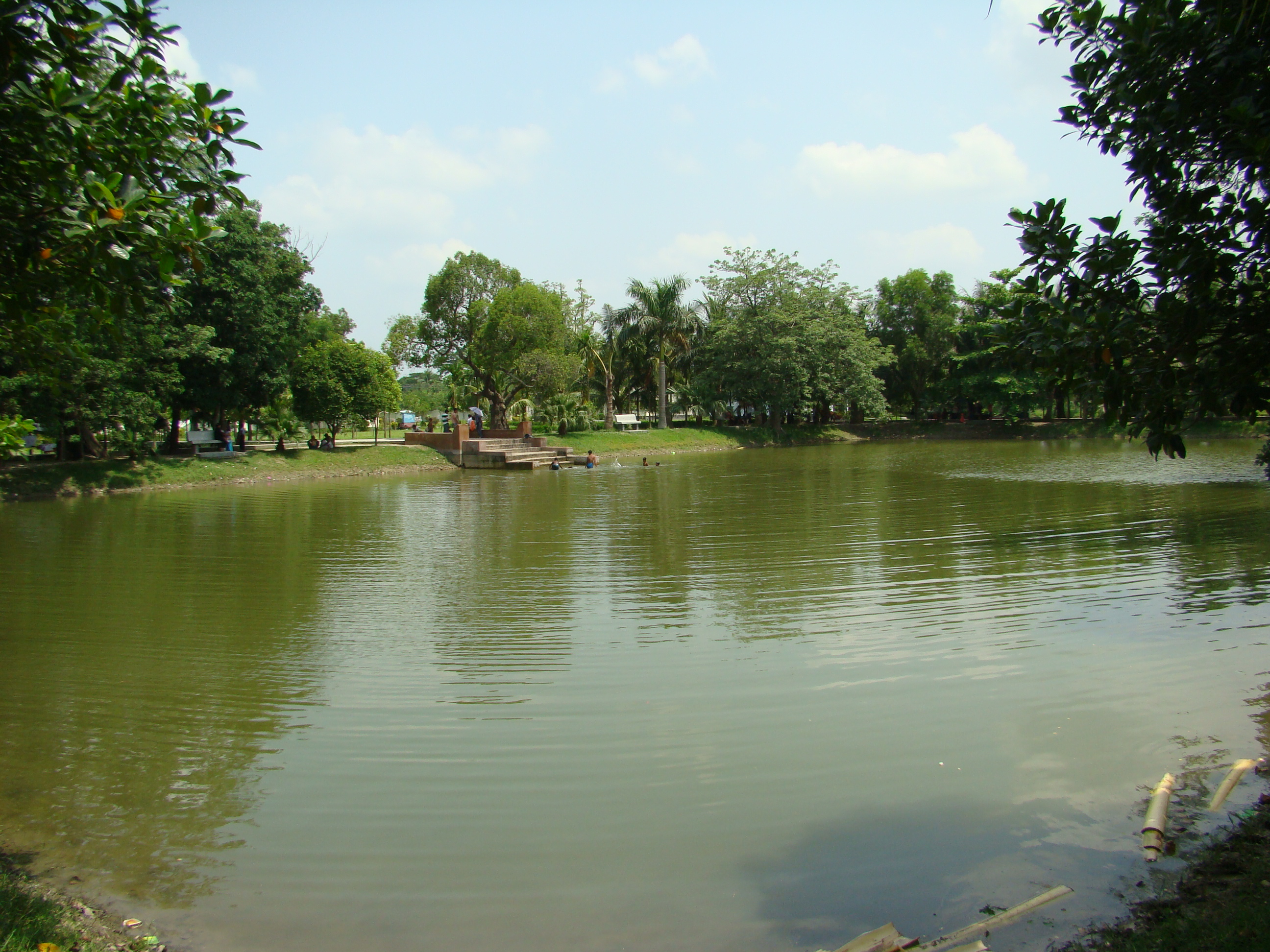
Pond in Shelaidaha Kuthibari premises (2008)

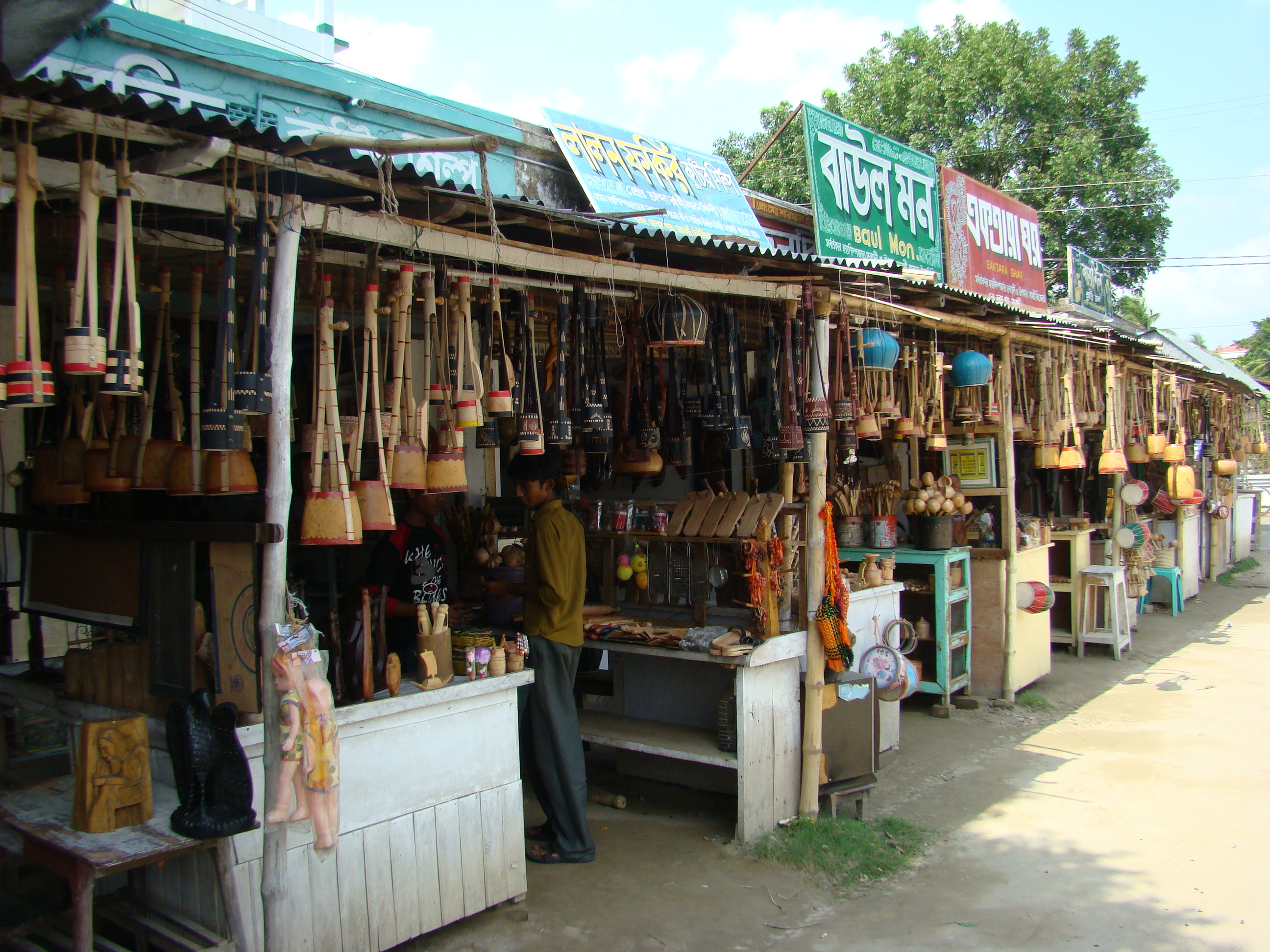
Shops for traveller's in front of Shelaidaha Kuthibari (2008)

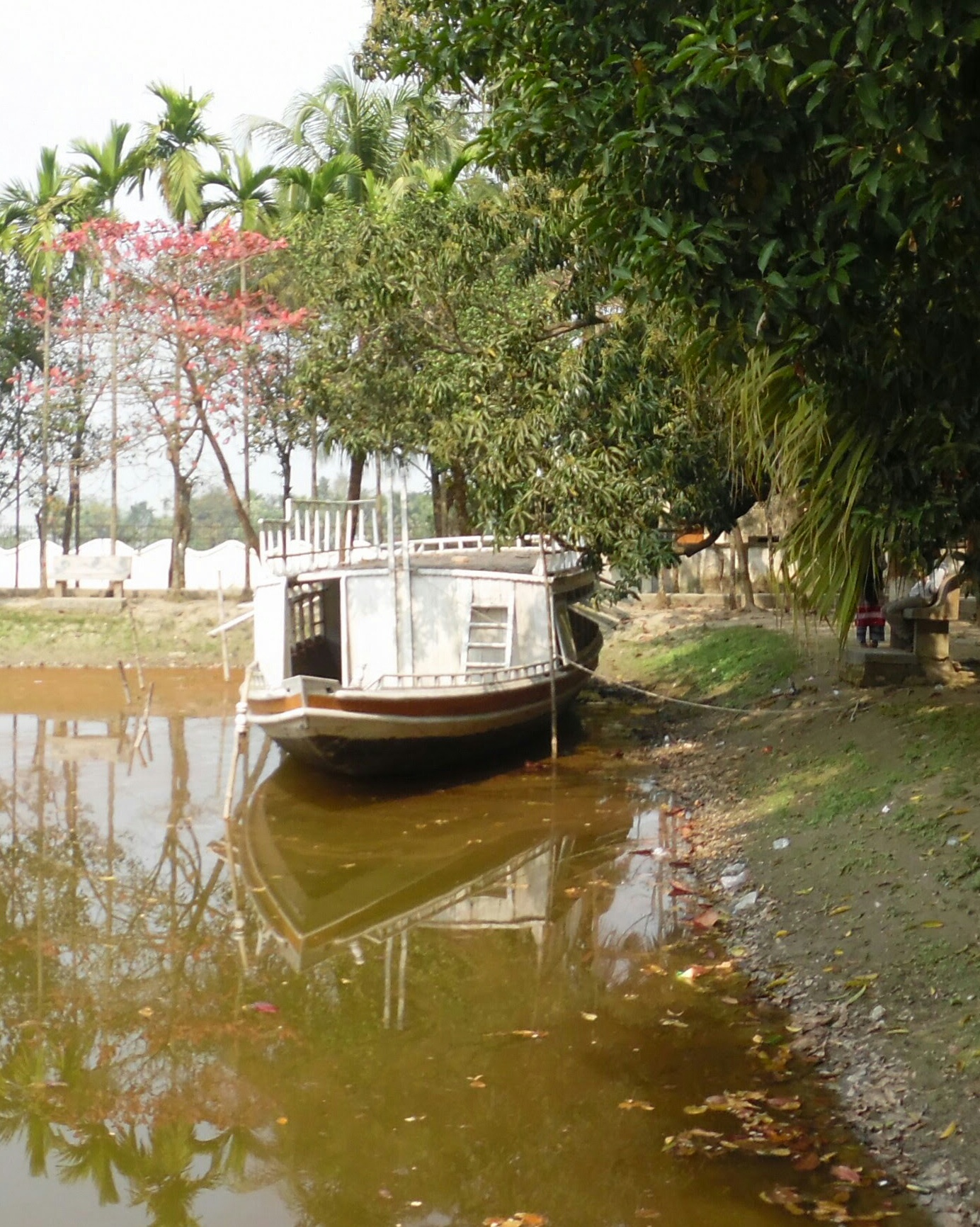
Replica of boat used by Rabindranath Tagore, reserved at the pond of Shelaidaha Kuthibari. (2016)

== See also ==
- Rabindra Bharati Museum, at Jorasanko Thakur Bari, Kolkata, India
- Rabindra Bhaban Museum, Santiniketan, India
