= Sonar Tori =

1894 collection of Bengali poems by Rabindranath Tagore

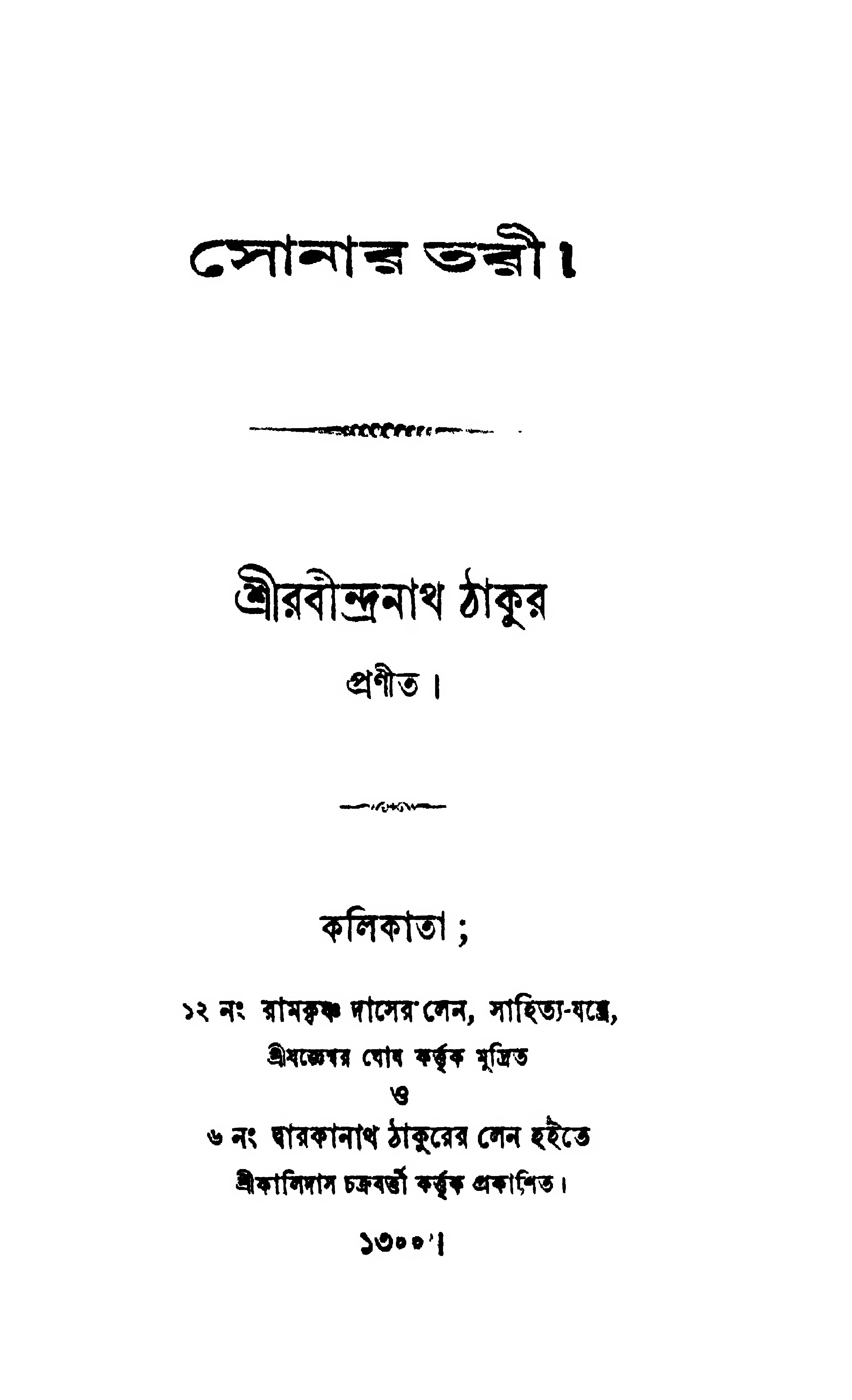
- Sonar Tori 1st edition title page
- Original title: সোনার তরী
- Language: Bengali
- Genre: Poetry
- Published: 1894
- Publication place: British India (now India)
- Media type: Print
- Pages: 218
- ISBN: 9788175225459
- Original text: সোনার তরী at Bangla Wikisource

Sonar Tori (alternatively spelt Sonar Tari, Bengali: সোনার তরী) is a collection of Bengali poetry by poet Rabindranath Tagore. The collection has more than forty poems and was first published in 1894. Sonar Tori is considered to be one of the most celebrated literary works of Tagore.

== Theme ==
In this poetry collection, the poet shows his thirst and quest for beauty, and detaching himself from the world of humanity.

== Publication ==
At a Kuthibari (house) at Shilaidaha Tagore stayed intermittently between 1891 and 1901. Many poems of this collection were written during his stay at this place. The poems of this collection were written between March 1892 and December 1893. The book was first published in 1894.
