= R710 (Bangladesh) =

Road in Bangladesh

R710
- Kushtia–Dhaka highway Kushtia Rajbari regional highway

Route information
- Length: 73.110 km (45.428 mi)

Major junctions
- West end: N704 (Chorhash intersection) in Kushtia
- East end: N7 (Goalondo intersection) in Rajbari

Location
- Country: Bangladesh

Highway system
- Roads in Bangladesh
← N704	→ N7

Kushtia-Rajbari regional highway or R710 connects Kushtia in Khulna Division and Rajbari Town in Dhaka Division. Although it is a regional highway, the road is better known as the Kushtia-Dhaka highway. This regional highway is the short distance road link between Kushtia and the capital Dhaka.

== Junction ==
District	Upazila	Location	Name of junction	Linked road
Kushtia	Kushtia Sadar	Kushtia	Chorhash intersection	N704
Kushtia	Kumarkhali	Aladdin Nagar	Aladdin Nagar intersection	R713
Rajbari	Rajbari Sadar	Bagmara	Bagmara bazar intersection	R711
Rajbari	Rajbari Sadar	Rajbari	Murgir Farm bus stand	Z7102
Rajbari	Rajbari Sadar	Ahladipur	Goalondo intersection	N7
