= Jorasanko Thakur Bari =

Haveli in North Kolkata, West Bengal, India

Coordinates: 22.5850°N 88.3592°E

- জোড়াসাঁকো ঠাকুর বাড়ি
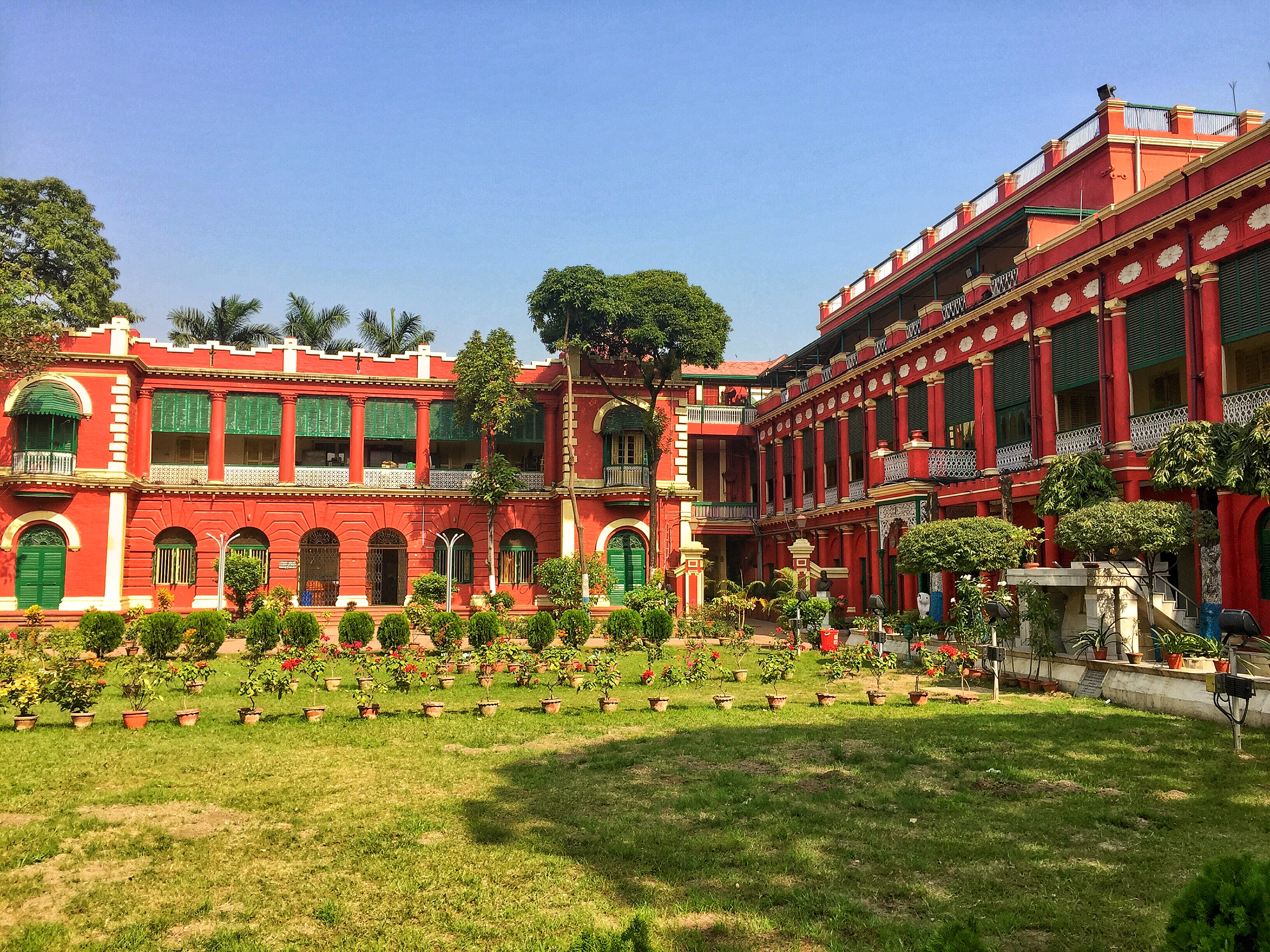

General information
- Architectural style: Traditional Bengali architecture
- Location: Kolkata, West Bengal, India
- Year built: 1784-85
- Owner: Tagore family

Technical details
- Floor area: 35000 m^{2}

Jorasanko Thakur Bari (Bengali: House of the Thakurs; anglicised to Tagore) is a Haveli in Jorasanko, North Kolkata, West Bengal, India, is the ancestral home of the Tagore family. It is the birthplace of poet Rabindranath Tagore and the host of the Rabindra Bharati University campus. Build in Traditional Bengali Architecture of Dalan genre, it is considered to be a heritage, historic icon and centre of socio-cultural evolution of Kolkata.

== History ==
Genealogy chart of the Tagore family, illustrating the Jorasanko Thakur Branch

The Jorasanko Thakur Bari was built in 1784 by Nilmoni Thakur in Jorasanko in the north of Kolkata. The land on which this ancestral home stands today was donated by the famous Sett family (not to be confused with Seth) of Burrabazar to Prince Dwarkanath Tagore, who was the grandfather of Rabindranath Tagore. Dwarkanath Tagore was the adopted son of Ramlochon Tagore and when he joined Brahmo Samaj, he was forced to leave his ancestral house at Pathuriaghata. Here comes the role of another influential family, the Sett. The Sett family had a marshy land where two small walking bridges ("Sanko" meaning bridges in Bengali) were present and they donated the land to Prince Dwarkanath Tagore. So from the small dual bridges came the name Jorasanko.

Nilmoni Tagore left his paternal house due to certain family disputes, and set up his new residence at Jorasanko, after having acquired a plot of land situated on the east side of Chitpore Road. It was Prince Dwarakanath Tagore, the illustrious businessman and Rabindranath's grandfather who expanded the residential complex. This is the Bhadrashan Bari (presently located at 6, Dwarakanath Tagore Lane) and it was here that Rabindranath was born in 1861. Another house was built adjacent to this house, called the Boithak Khana Bari (currently situated at 5, Dwarakanath Tagore Lane), in 1823, to house and receive European visitors. This later became the residence of Girindranath and his family, and the art-workspace of Abanindranath and Gaganendranath Tagore, two prominent members of the Bengali School of Art. A significant chunk of Bengal's cultural spatial history was lost forever when this house was destroyed and pulled down in 1943. The Bhadrashan Bari today is known as the Maharshi Bhavan.

=== Rabindra Bharati University ===
The Rabindra Bharati University was established by the government of West Bengal in 1961 to commemorate the birth centenary of Rabindranath Tagore.

=== Rabindra Bharati Museum ===
The house has been restored to reflect the way the household looked when the Tagore family lived in it and currently serves as the Tagore museum, offering details about the history of the Tagore family including their involvement in the Bengal Renaissance and the Brahmo Samaj. Photography is strictly prohibited inside the museum, but allowed outside. There is a light and sound show also, which happens in the evening.

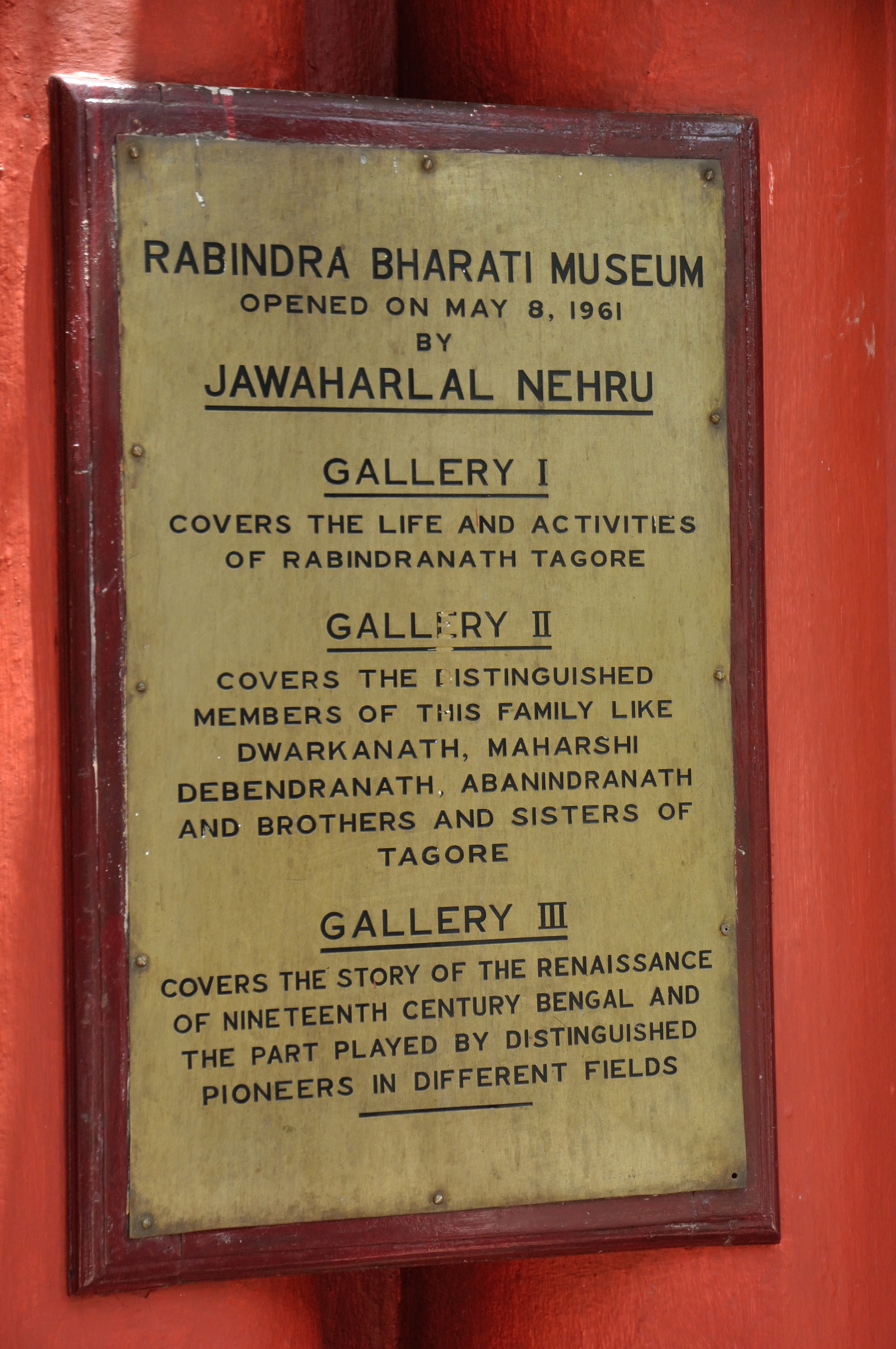
Inaugural Plaque - Rabindra Bharati Museum - Maharshi Bhavan - Jorasanko Thakur Bari. It was inaugurated by Jawaharlal Nehru, the first Prime Minister of India.

The Government of West Bengal had long initiated the plan to establish a University in honour of one of Bengal's greatest poet-philosopher Rabindranath Tagore, which finally took shape in 1961. The year was special as it marked the centenary celebrations of Tagore's birth anniversary. Accordingly, under the Rabindra Bharati Act the university was set up at the Tagores' Jorasanko residence. The university aimed at the advancement of culture and arts. The Rabindra Bharati Museum was formed the following year. Located to the west of Maharshi Bhavan is the Bichitra Bhavan, another building that was built in 1897 by Rabindranath Tagore himself. The architecture follows closely the colonial style. Partly plastered and painted in white, this red brick structure is imposing, and situated amidst trees like the white frangipani, Champa, Spanish cherry, Ashoka, etc. This building today houses the museum and the archives. It is exhibited on the first floor of the house.

The Museum has a wide-ranging collection. Galleries are devoted to the leading figures of Bengali Renaissance, including but not limited to Dwarakanath, Debendranath, Rabindranath, Aban Thakur, and Gaganendranath. A gallery displays artworks from the Bengal School of Art founded by Abanindranath Tagore. Another shows portraits and paintings of the Tagore house and family by the Anglo-Indian school. The latter is called the Western Art Gallery. There are also galleries devoted to Rabindranath, showing his life, works and ideas. The poet-prophet's visits, tours, influence and relationships with offshore countries are shown in the respective Japan Gallery, China Gallery, Hungary Gallery, and the US Gallery. There are also recent developments to create an Italy Gallery that shall show Tagore's relations with the land, and ideas, and would strengthen Italy-India bilateral and cultural relations.

=== Visits and programmes ===
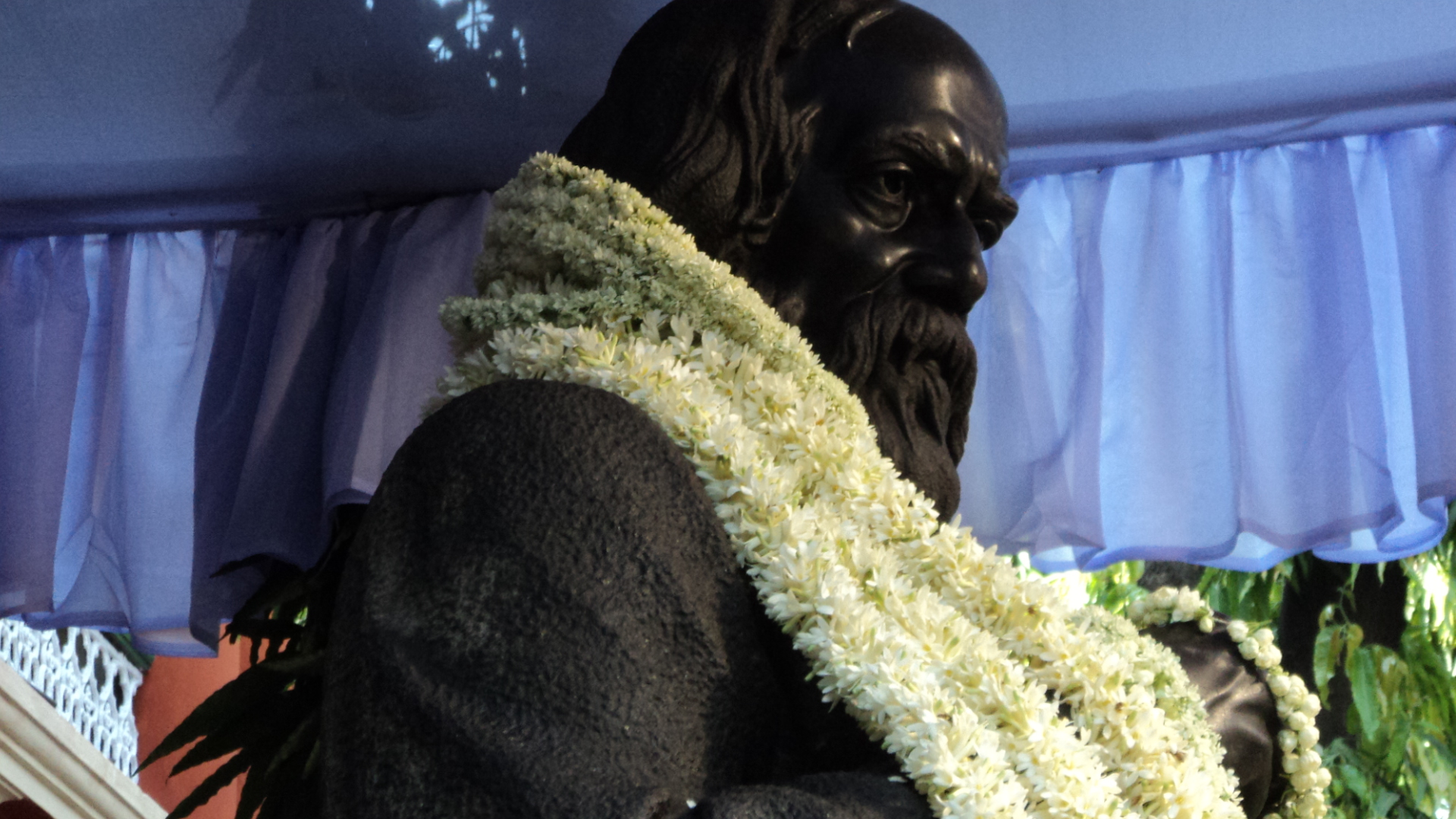
Panchise Baisakh Celebration at Jorasanko Thakur Bari

The Rabindra Bharati University organizes regular cultural programmes on Tagore's birthday, Panchise Baisakh, when thousands flock to Jorasanko Thakur Bari, and on other occasions, such as his death anniversary, Baishe Shravan. It also organises a festival of arts, Aban Mela.

== Gallery ==
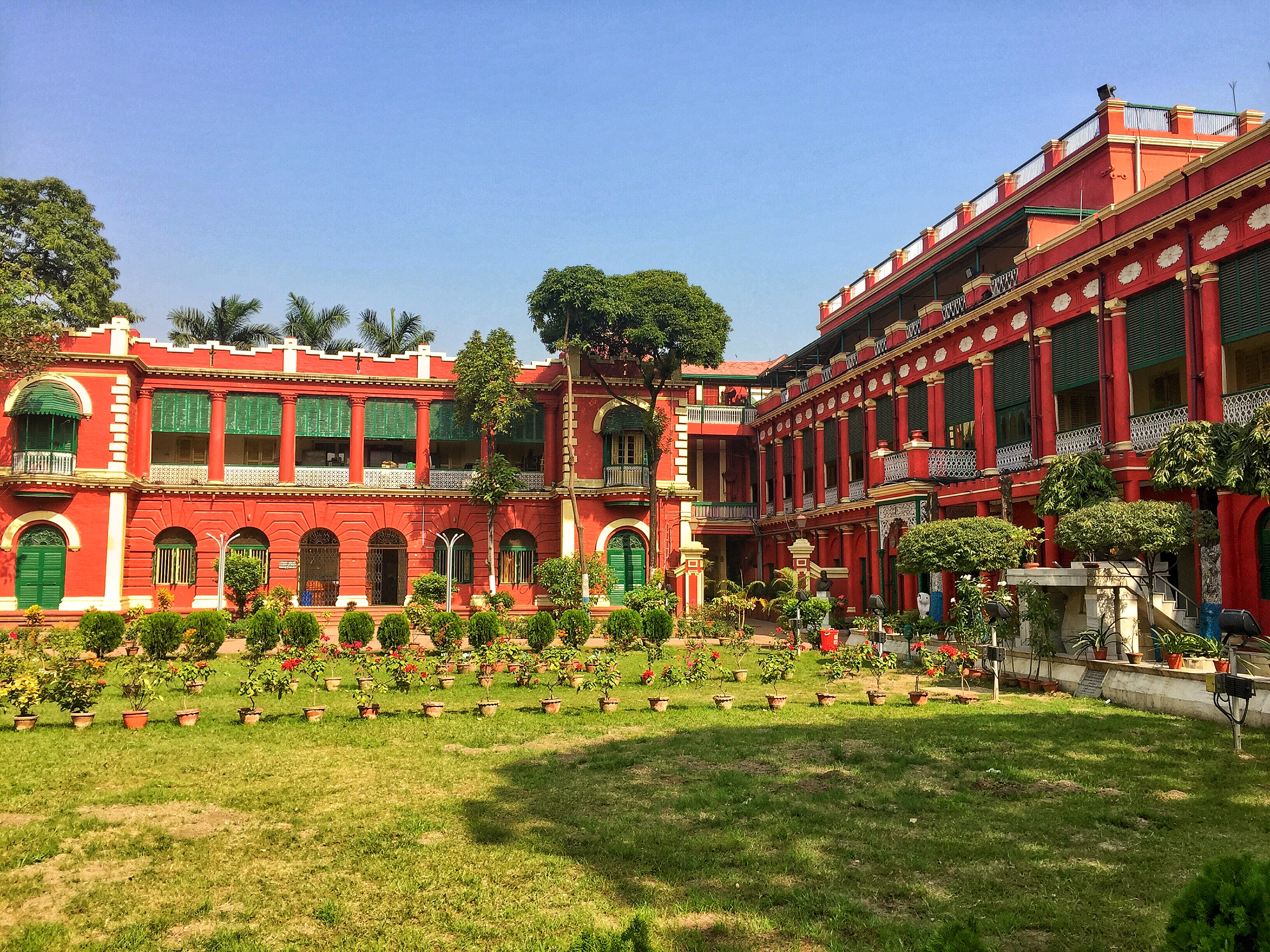
Jorasanko Thakurbari, Kolkata

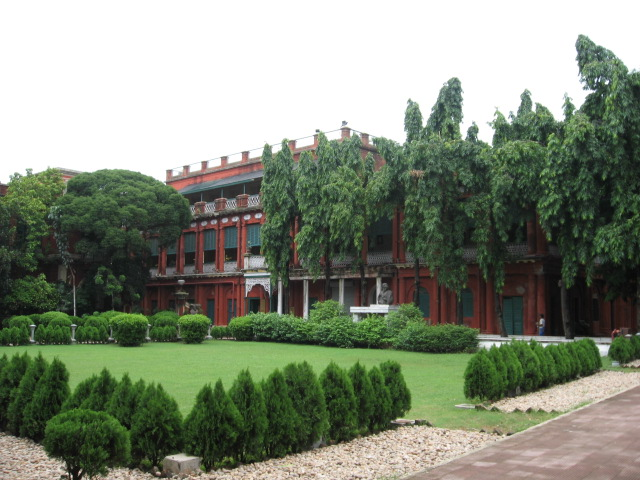
Jorasanko Thakur Bari, Now Rabindra Bharati University

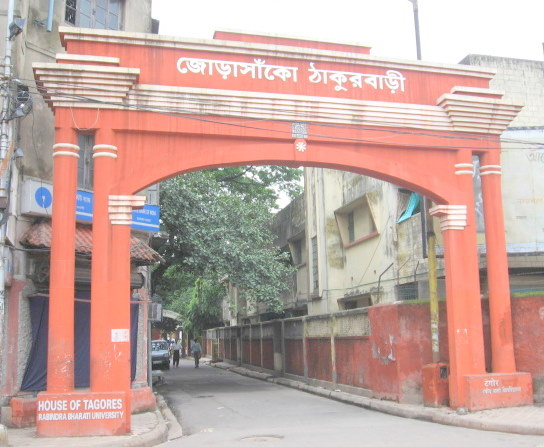
Jorasanko Thakur Bari Gate on Rabindra Sarani

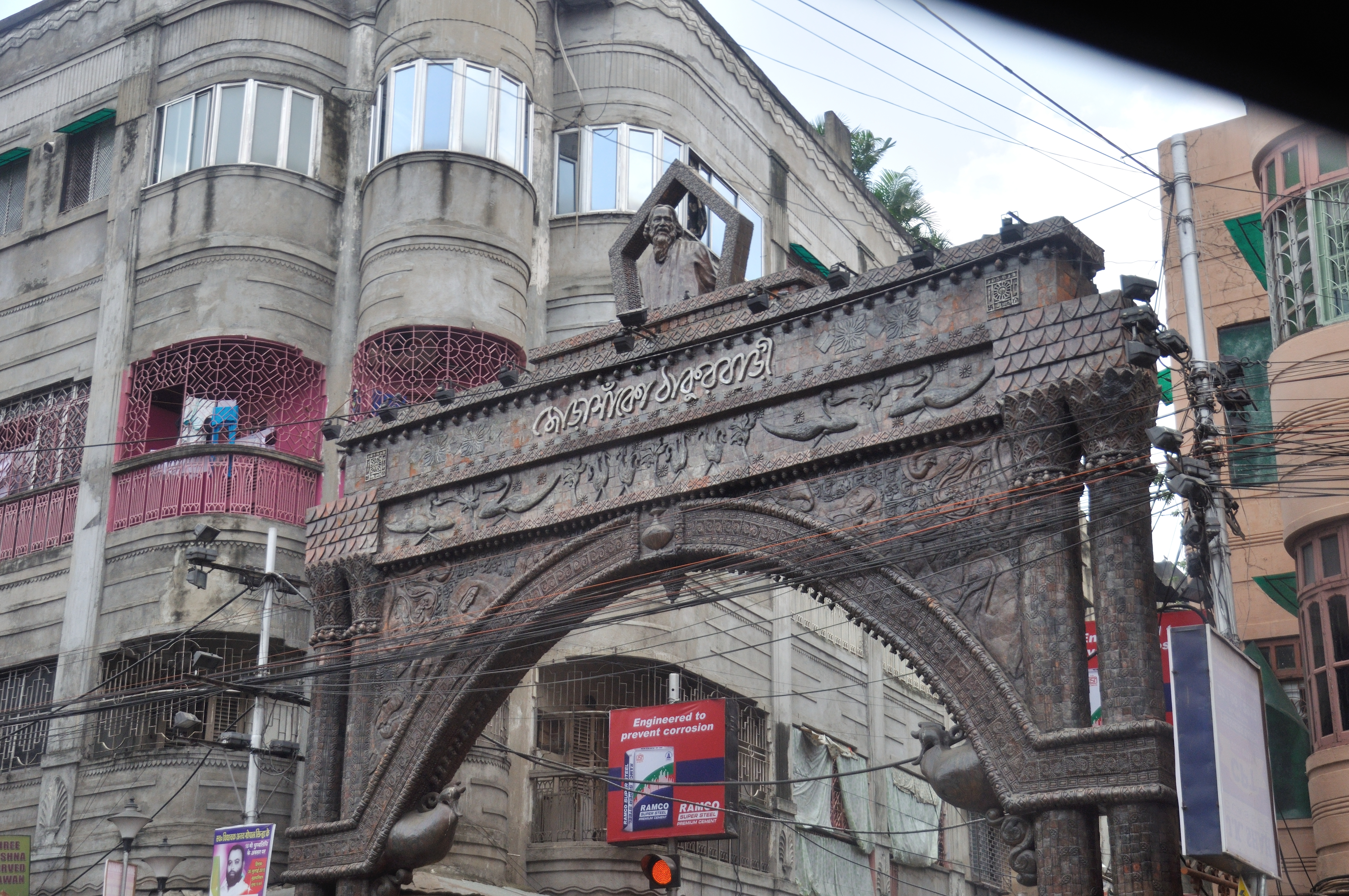
Jorasanko Thakur Bari Gate on Chittaranjan Avenue

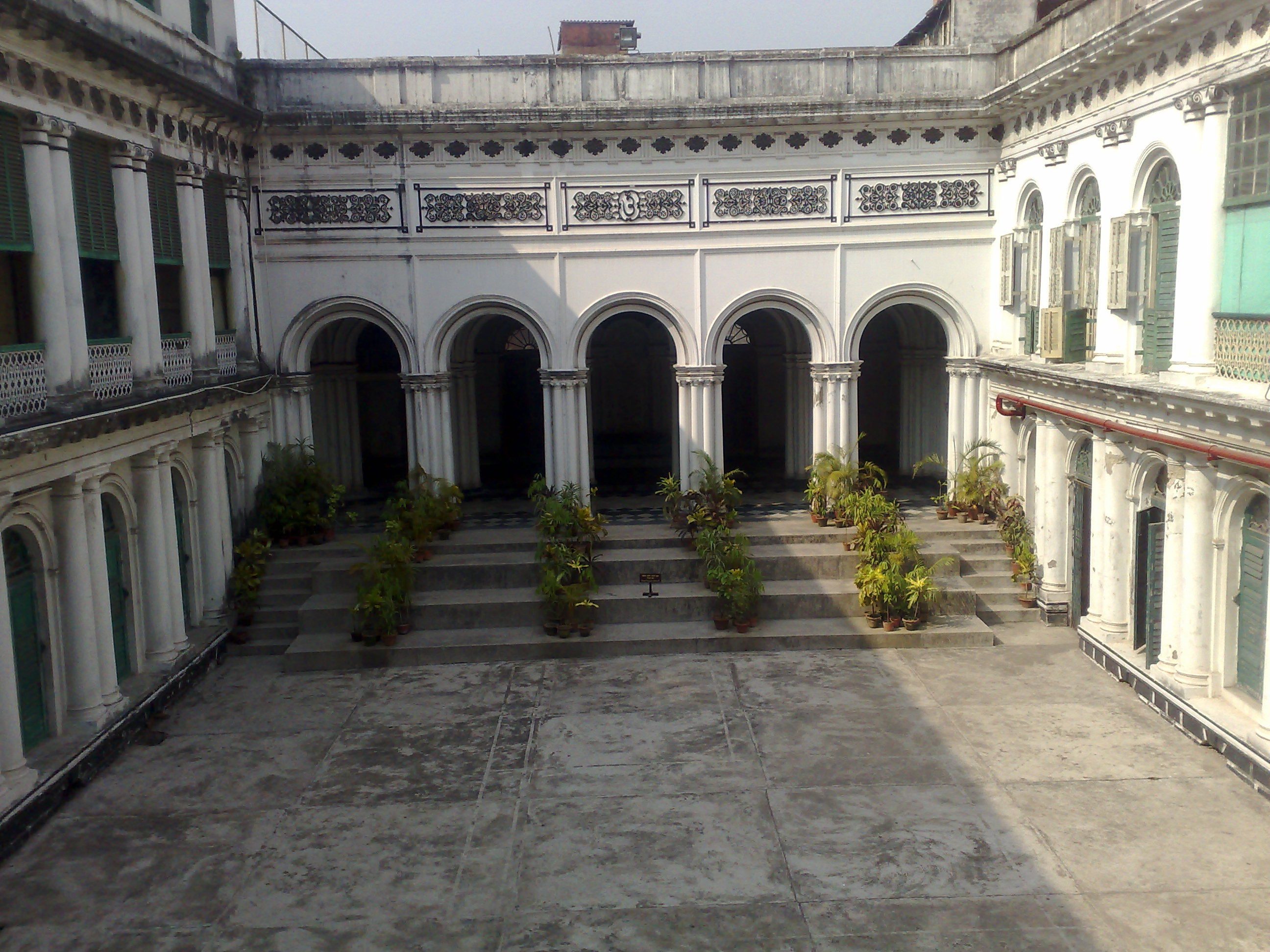
Inner Verandah of Jorasanko Mansion

== See also ==
- Tagore Memorial Museum, at Shilaidaha Kuthibadi, Shilaidaha, Bangladesh
- Santiniketan
- Celebrating Tagore
- Phalguni Mookhopadhayay
