= Dwarkanath Tagore =

Indian industrialist (1794–1846)

Prince Dwarakanath Tagore
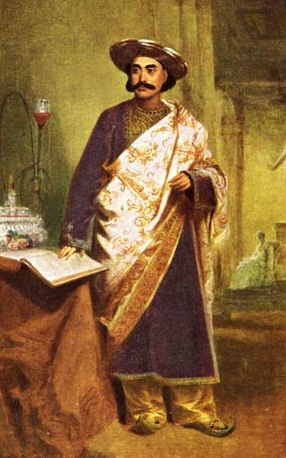
- Acad.style: Prince Dwarakanath Tagore, by F.B. Carpenter, c.1840s
- Born: 1794; Gobindapur Village, Calcutta, Bengal
- Died: 1 August 1846 (aged 51–52); Westminster, London, Great Britain
- Other name: Prince Dwarkanath Tagore
- Citizenship: British Indian
- Occupation: Industrialist
- Spouse: Digambari Devi (m. 1811–1839)
- Children: Debendranath Tagore +2 others
- Parents: Rammoni Tagore (biological), Ramlochan Tagore (adoptive) (father); Menaka Devi (biological), Aloka Sundari Devi (adoptive) (mother)
- Family: Tagore family

Dwarkanath Tagore (also spelled Dwarakanath Thakur; 1794–1846), popularly known as Prince Dwarkanath Tagore, was one of the first Indian industrialists to partner with the British. He was the son of Rammoni Tagore, and was given in adoption to Rammoni's elder brother Ramlochan Tagore. He was the scion of the Tagore family of Calcutta, father of Debendranath Tagore, grandfather of Rabindranath Tagore, and great-grandfather of Abanindranath Tagore.

== Ancestry ==
Dwarakanath Tagore was a descendant of Brahmins of the Kushari division. They were called Pirali Brahmin — the word "Pirali" comes from Pir Ali, a convert to Islam who supposedly dined with and converted two Tagore ancestors. Their relatives, still Hindus, were tainted by association and got the name "Pirali Brahmin".

Dwarakanath's great grandfather Jairam Tagore made a large fortune as a merchant and Dewan to the French government at Chandannagar. He shifted from Gobindapur to Pathuriaghata when the British constructed the new Fort William in the mid-eighteenth century. His eldest son, Nilmoni Tagore (b.1721 – d.1791), with his wife Lalita Devi and sons, settled at Jorasanko after leaving the ancestral house at Pathuriaghata following a rift with his younger brother Darpanarayan Tagore. Nilmoni Tagore built the Jorasanko Thakur Bari where the Jorasanko branch of the family dwelled, while Darpanarayan Tagore's descendants belonged to the Pathuriaghata Tagore branch.

== Childhood ==
Nilmoni's grandson, Dwarakanath Tagore, was born in 1794 to Rammoni Tagore and his wife Menaka Devi. Soon after birth, he was given in adoption to Rammoni's childless elder brother Ramlochan (b.1759 – d.1807), a rich man of his time and a patron of music. Menaka Devi was the younger sister of Dwarakanath's adoptive mother Aloka Sundari Devi.

Dwarakanath studied at the English-medium school of Mr. Sherbourne. In 1807, Ramlochan died leaving a considerable inheritance in trust to Dwarakanath, who was then a minor aged 13. This property consisted of the zamindari of Berhampore, estates in Orissa, and urban holdings in Calcutta. Dwarakanath left school in 1810 at the age of 16 and apprenticed himself under renowned barrister, Robert Cutlar Fergusson and traveled between Calcutta and his estates at Behrampore and Cuttack.

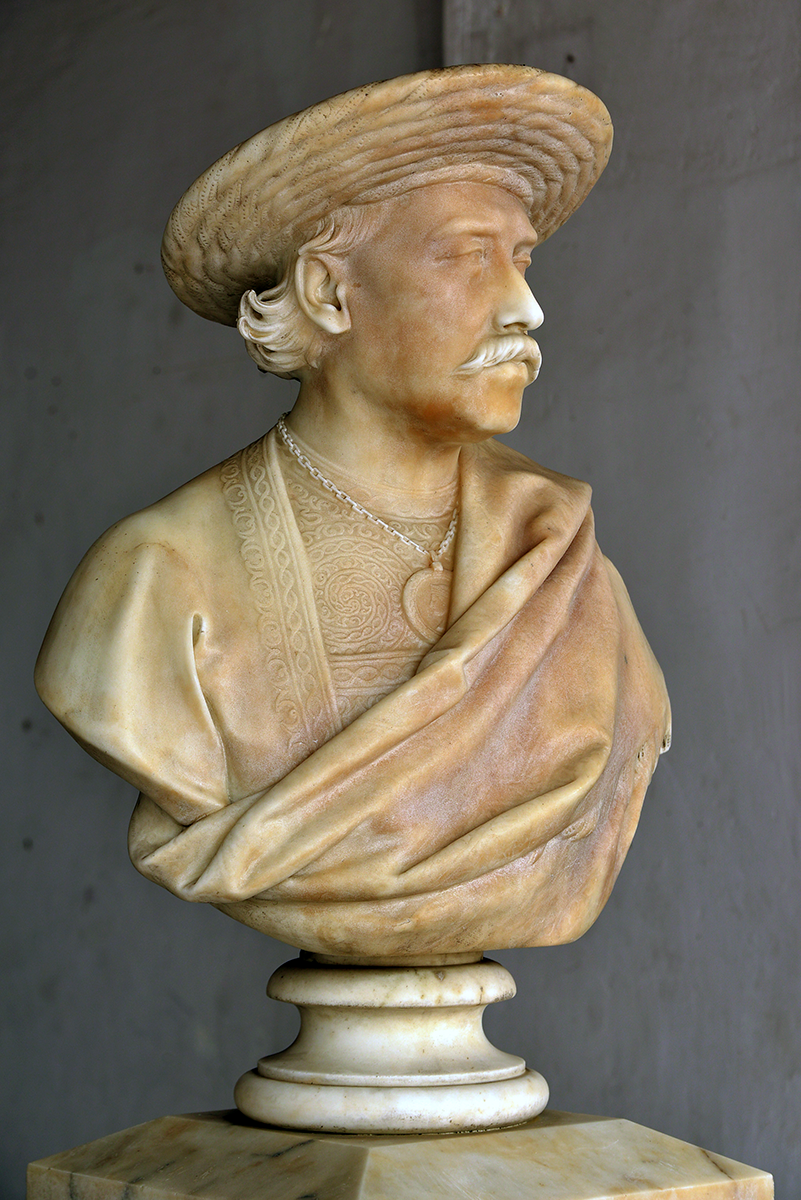
Bust of Dwarkanath Tagore at the National Library of India.

== Marriage ==
At the age of 17, Dwarakanath married the 9 years old Digambari Devi, daughter of a zamindar from near Jessore, in 1811. They had 4 sons and 1 daughter - among whom 3 survived — Debendranath Tagore (b. 1817 – d. 1905), Girindranath Tagore (b. 1820 – d. 1854) and Nagendranath Tagore (b. 1829 – d. 1858). As Dwarakanath started leading an extravagant lifestyle, his married life with his orthodox Hindu wife got strained. She consulted with Hindu Brahmins regarding his behaviour and finally decided to stop interaction with her husband. Whenever she had to speak to him regarding household matters, she used to take a bath in the holy Ganges water. It continued this way for some time. However, after taking such a bath in a cold winter night, Digambari caught fever, and died in 1839 at the age of 37.

== Business life ==
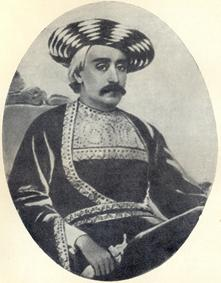
Portrait of Dwarakanath Thakur, c. 1907.

Tagore was a western-educated Bengali Brahmin and a civic leader of Calcutta who played a pioneering role in setting up a string of commercial ventures—banking, insurance, and shipping companies—in partnership with British traders. In 1828, he became the first Indian bank director. In 1829, he founded Union Bank in Calcutta. He helped found the first Anglo-Indian managing agency (industrial organisations that ran jute mills, coal mines, tea plantations, etc.) Carr, Tagore and Company. (Earlier, Rustomjee Cowasjee, a Parsi in Calcutta, had formed an inter-racial firm, but in the early 19th century Parsis were classified as a Near Eastern community as opposed to South Asian.)

Tagore's company managed large zamindari estates spread across today's West Bengal and Odisha states in India, and in Bangladesh, and held stakes in new enterprises that were tapping the rich coal seams of Bengal, running tug services between Calcutta and the mouth of the river Hooghly, and growing tea in Assam.

Carr, Tagore and Company was also engaged in shipping opium to China.

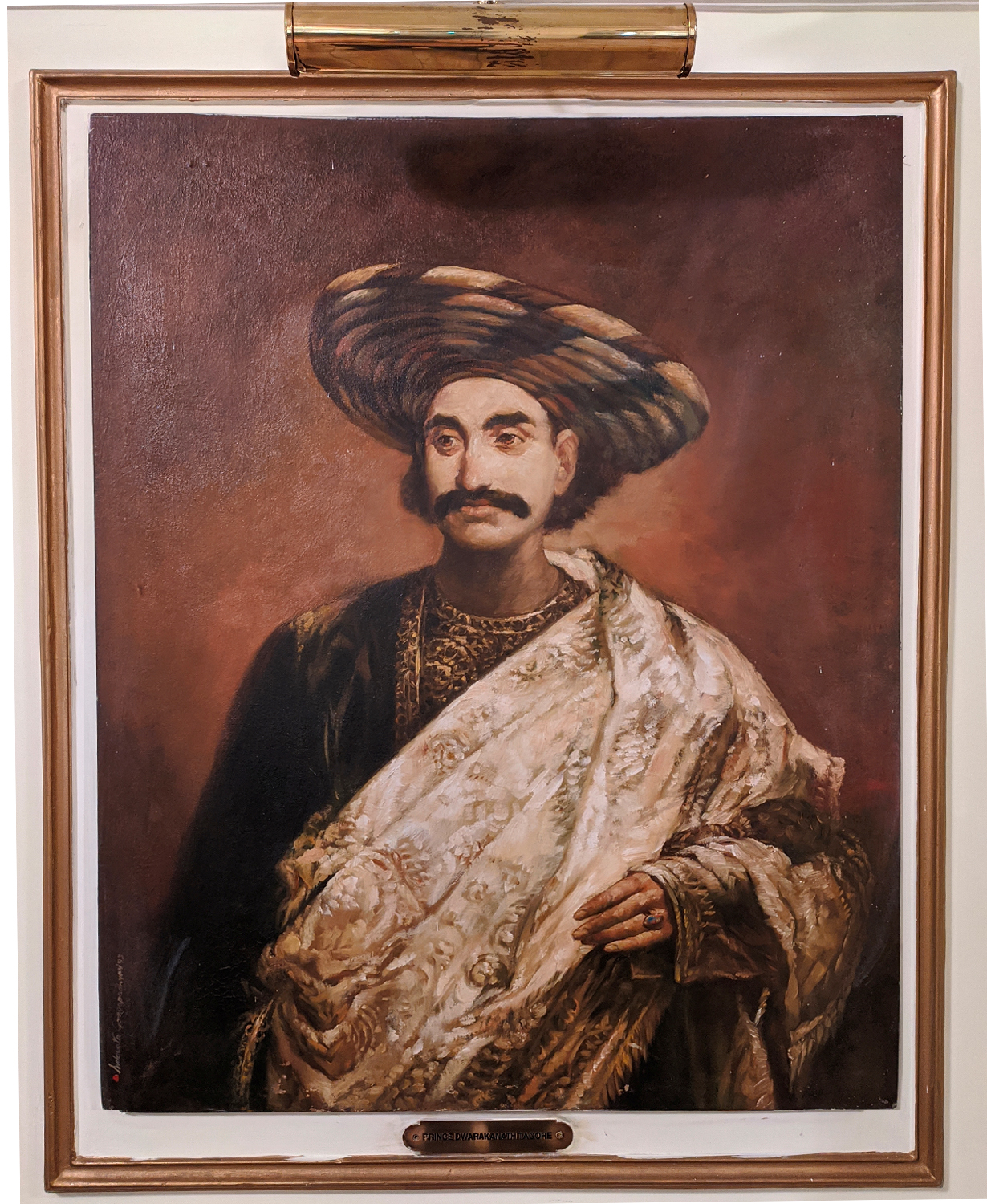
Portrait of Dwarakanath Tagore at The Bengal Club

In 1832, Tagore purchased a coal mine at Raniganj, the oldest, largest, and richest coal mine in India. It eventually became the Bengal Coal Company. Dwarkanath Tagore owned a separate historic house in Baruipur known as Nimak Mahal (also called Old Barakuthi). He acquired the property while he was associated with the salt trade and served in the Baruipur Salt Division. Later, Bankim Chandra Chattopadhyay lived in this house during his tenure as Deputy Magistrate of Baruipur (1864–1868), where he wrote some of his famous literary works.

== Death ==
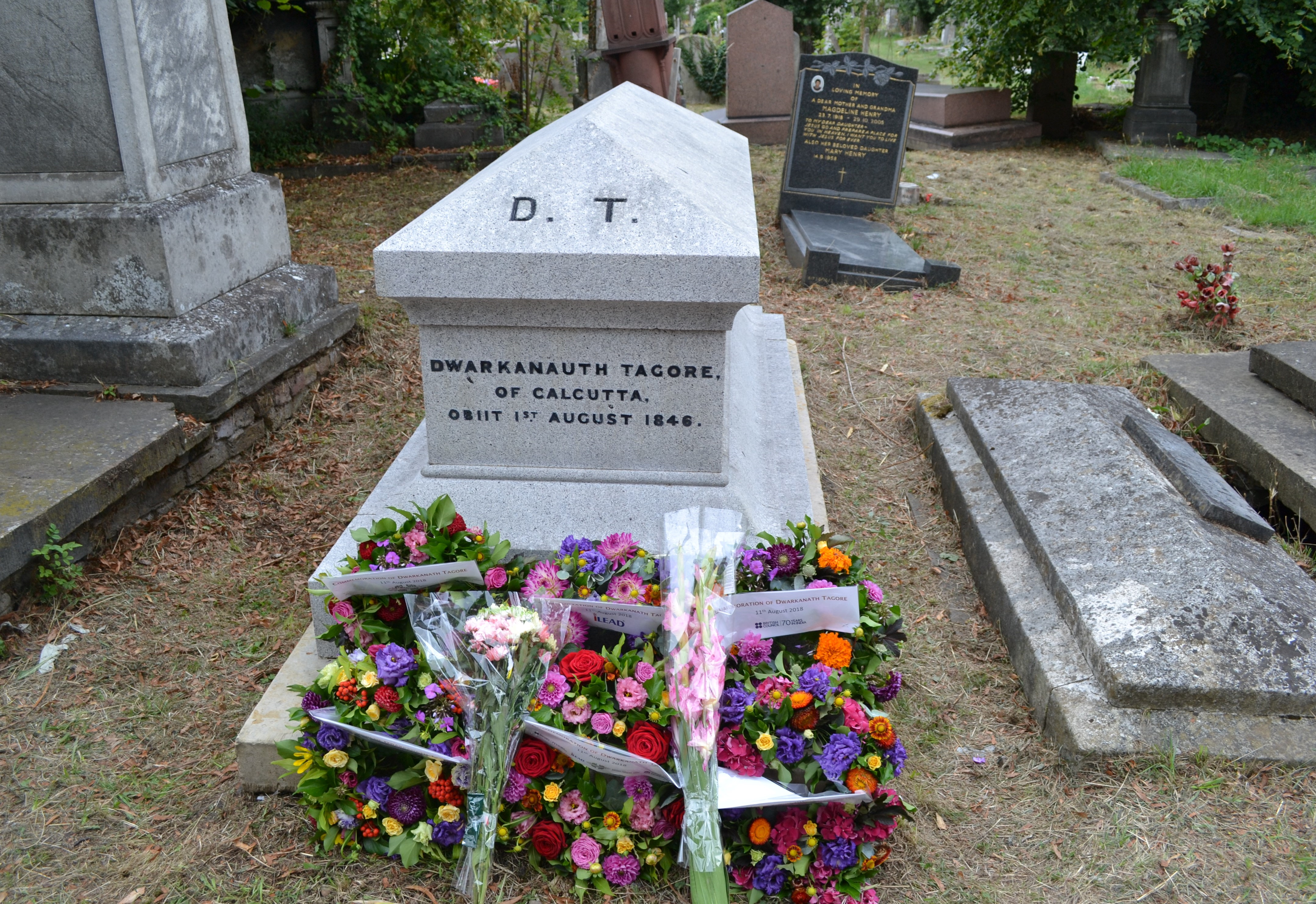
Monument of Dwarkanath Tagore at Kensal Green Cemetery, London.

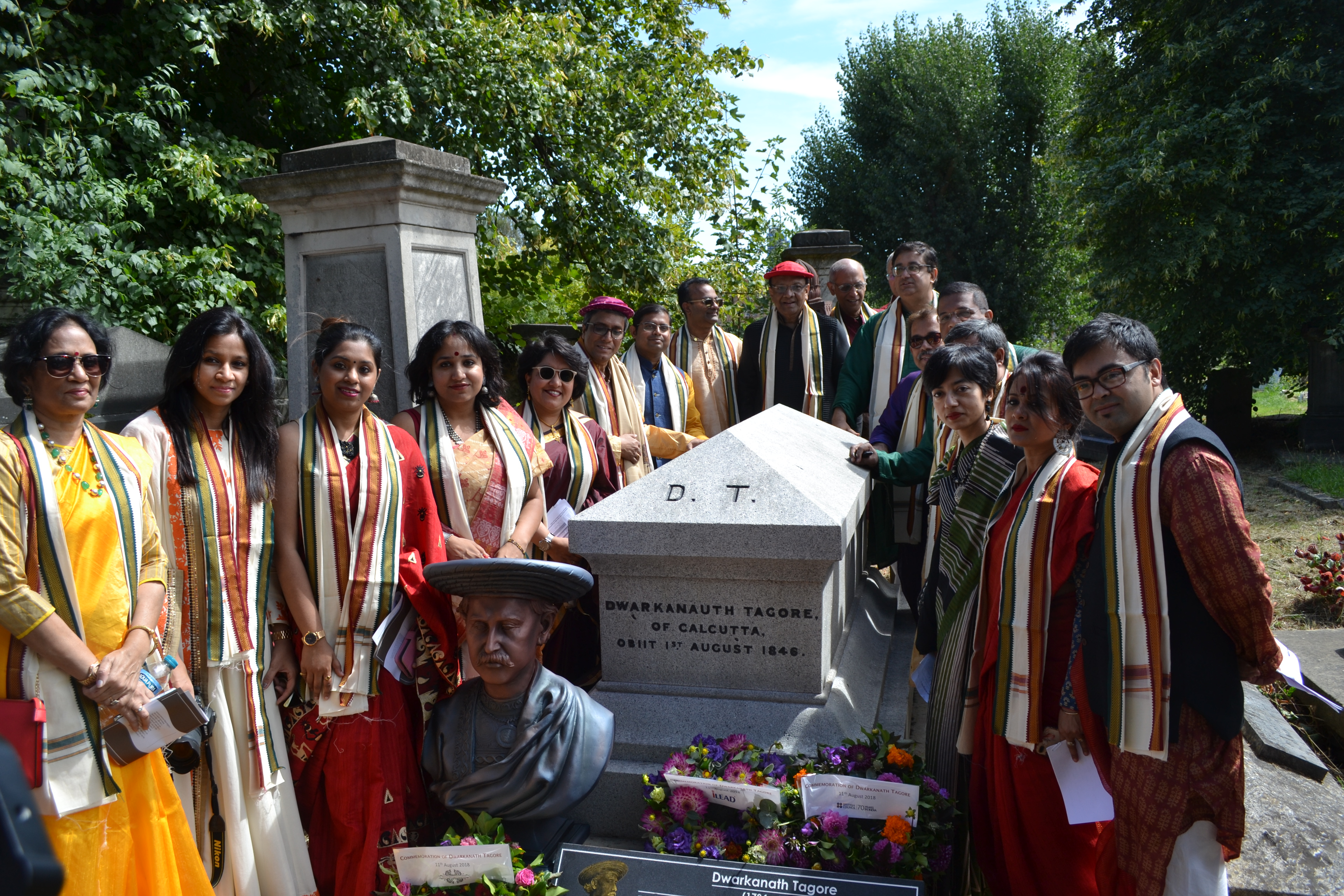
A commemoration to Dwarkanath Tagore at Kensal Green Cemetery on 11 August 2018 was organised by Bengal Heritage Foundation.

Dwarakanath Tagore died "at the peak of his fortune" on the evening of 1 August 1846 at St. George's Hotel in London.

In his obituary, The London Mail newspaper of 7 August wrote:

Descended from the highest Brahmin caste of India his family can prove a long and undoubted pedigree. But it is not on account of this nobility that we now review his life but on far better grounds. However gifted, his claims rest on a higher pedestal – he was the benefactor of his country... They testified to his merits in the encouragement of every public and private undertaking likely to benefit India.
