= Shilaidaha Rabindra Kuthibari =

Estate manor in Kushtia District, Bangladesh

- শিলাইদহ রবীন্দ্র কুঠিবাড়ি (Bengali)
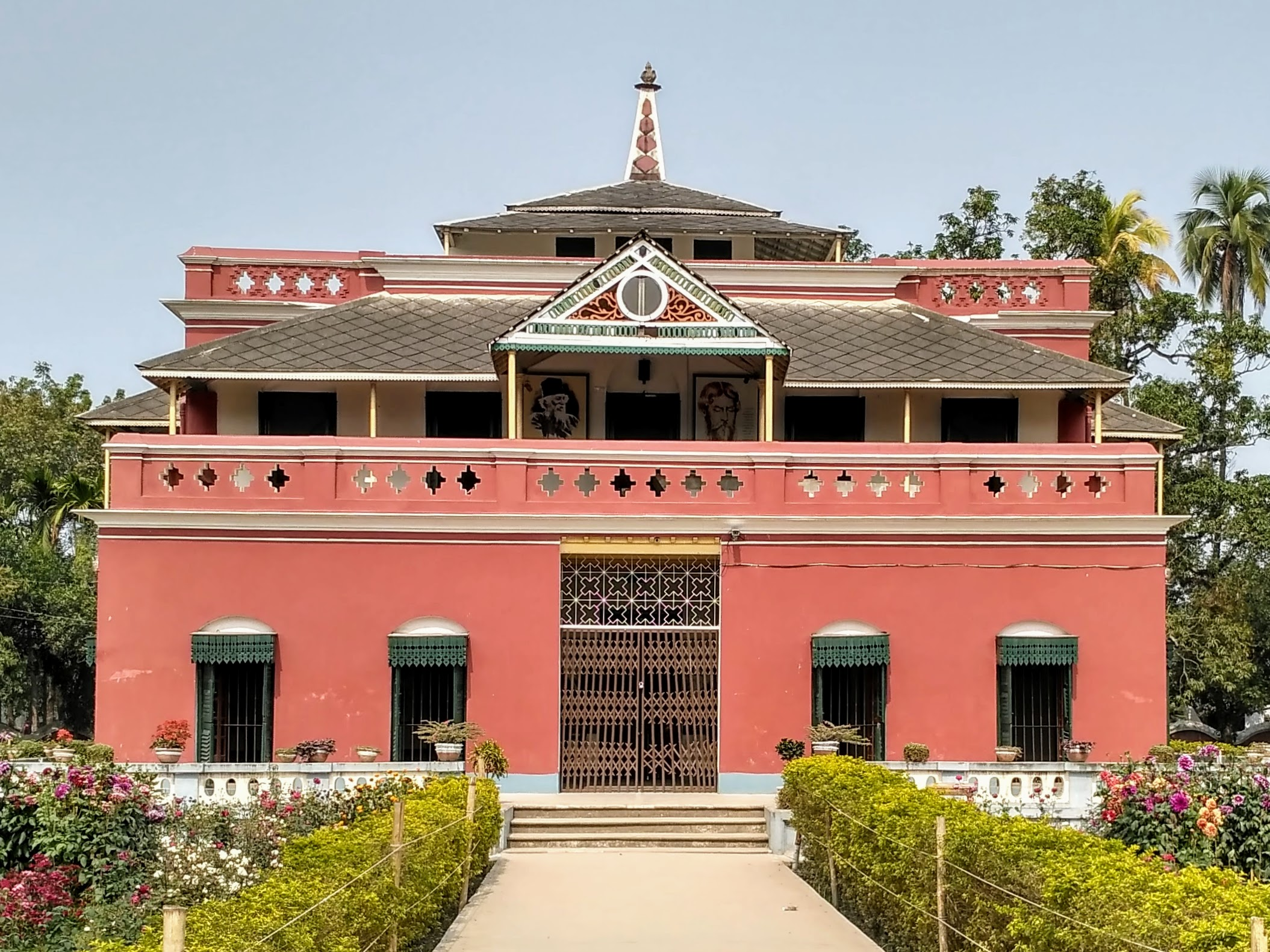
- Main building of Shilaidaha Rabindra Kuthibari
- Interactive map of Shilaidaha Rabindra Kuthibari
- 23.919641°N 89.219961°E
- Type: Complex
- Location: Shilaidaha, Kumarkhali Upazila, Kushtia District
- Nearest city: Kushtia

History
- Founder: Ramlochan Tagore
- Built for: Residence

Site notes
- Area: 11 acre
- Current use: Tourist attraction
- Owner: Government of Bangladesh

Shilaidaha Rabindra Kuthibari, often shortened to Shilaidah Kuthibari, is a manor house and a tourist destination in Bangladesh. It is located in the village of Shilaidaha, seven kilometers north of Kushtia, on the banks of the Padma River, in the Kumarkhali Upazila of Kushtia District.

== History ==
Shilaidah Kuthibari was built by an indigo planter and later came under the ownership of the Tagore family. It served as the residence of Rabindranath Tagore in the 19th century.

Following the passing of the East Bengal State Acquisition and Tenancy Act of 1950, Shilaidah Kuthibari was acquired by the Government of East Bengal In 1969, the provincial government planned to preserve it as a historical site. Since the independence of Bangladesh in 1971, it has been under the auspices of the Department of Archeology.

In 1986, Shilaidah Kuthibari became a museum. It holds over 80 photographs of Rabindranath Tagore as well as numerous personal items.

In 2013, then-President of India, Pranab Mukherjee, visited Shilaidah Kuthibari and offered to provide financial assistance for the construction of a complex at the site; this was completed in 2020.

In 2018, a dam was constructed to protect the compound, but part of it collapsed later that year. In 2022, another part of the dam collapsed.

== Architecture ==
Shilaidah Kuthibari sits on 11 acre of land. The building, which has an area of 273.87 square metres (2,947.9 sq ft), consists of three storeys with 18 rooms and a central hall. It has a total of 17 doors and 30 windows and measures 8.71 metres (28.6 ft) in height. It is built in the Indo-Saracenic style and includes a library, two ponds, a mango orchard, a garden, and an auditorium.

== Tourism ==
Shilaidah Kuthibari is a tourist attraction for locals as well as foreign visitors. A three-day event is organized every year on the occasion of Rabindranath Tagore's birthday, though this was cancelled in 2020 and 2021, due to the COVID-19 pandemic.

== In popular culture ==
The stall of the Department of Archeology at the 2022 Ekushey Book Fair was modelled after Shilaidah Kuthibari.

== Gallery ==
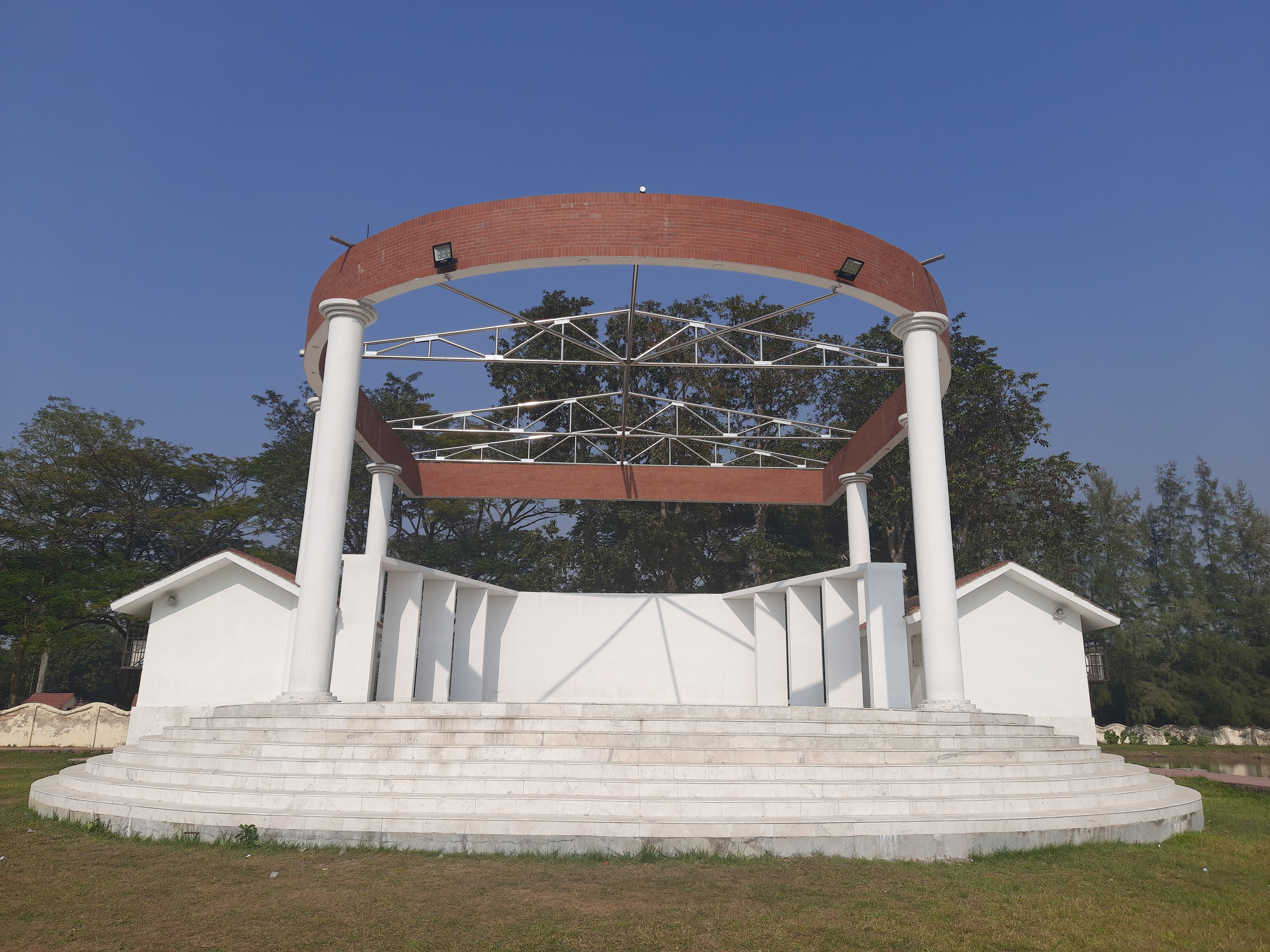
Amphitheatre

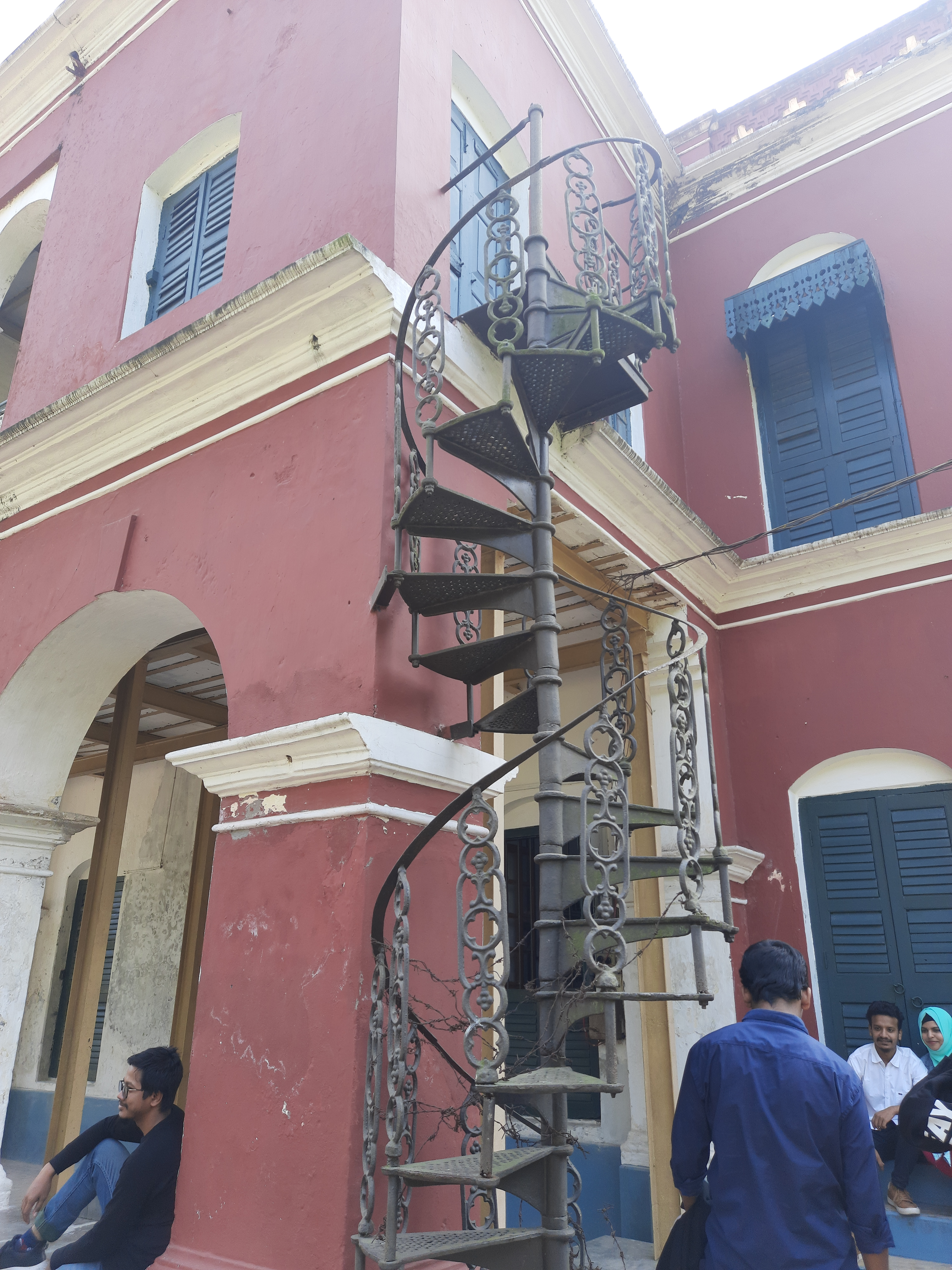
Back stairs

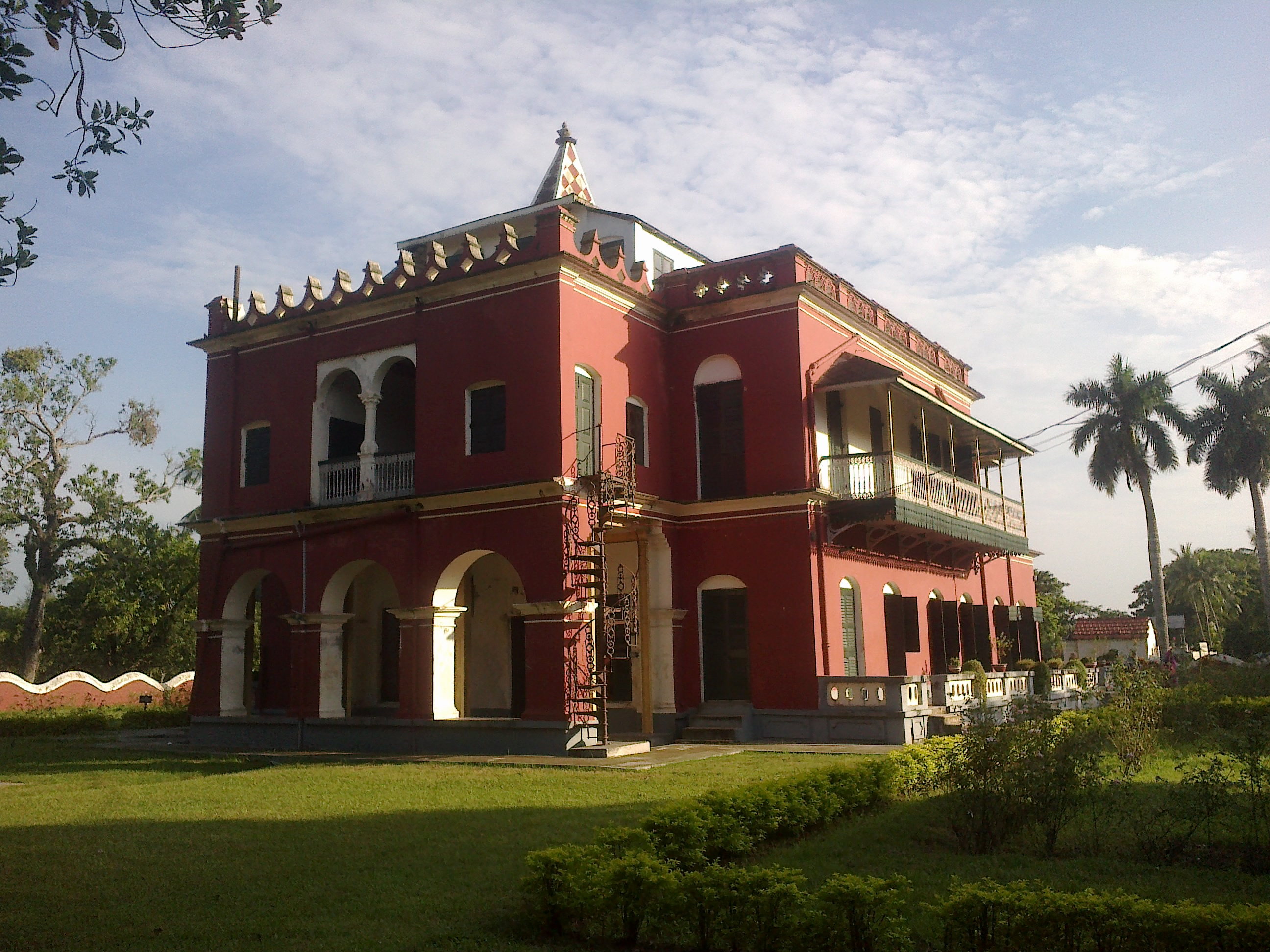
Shilaidah Kuthibari

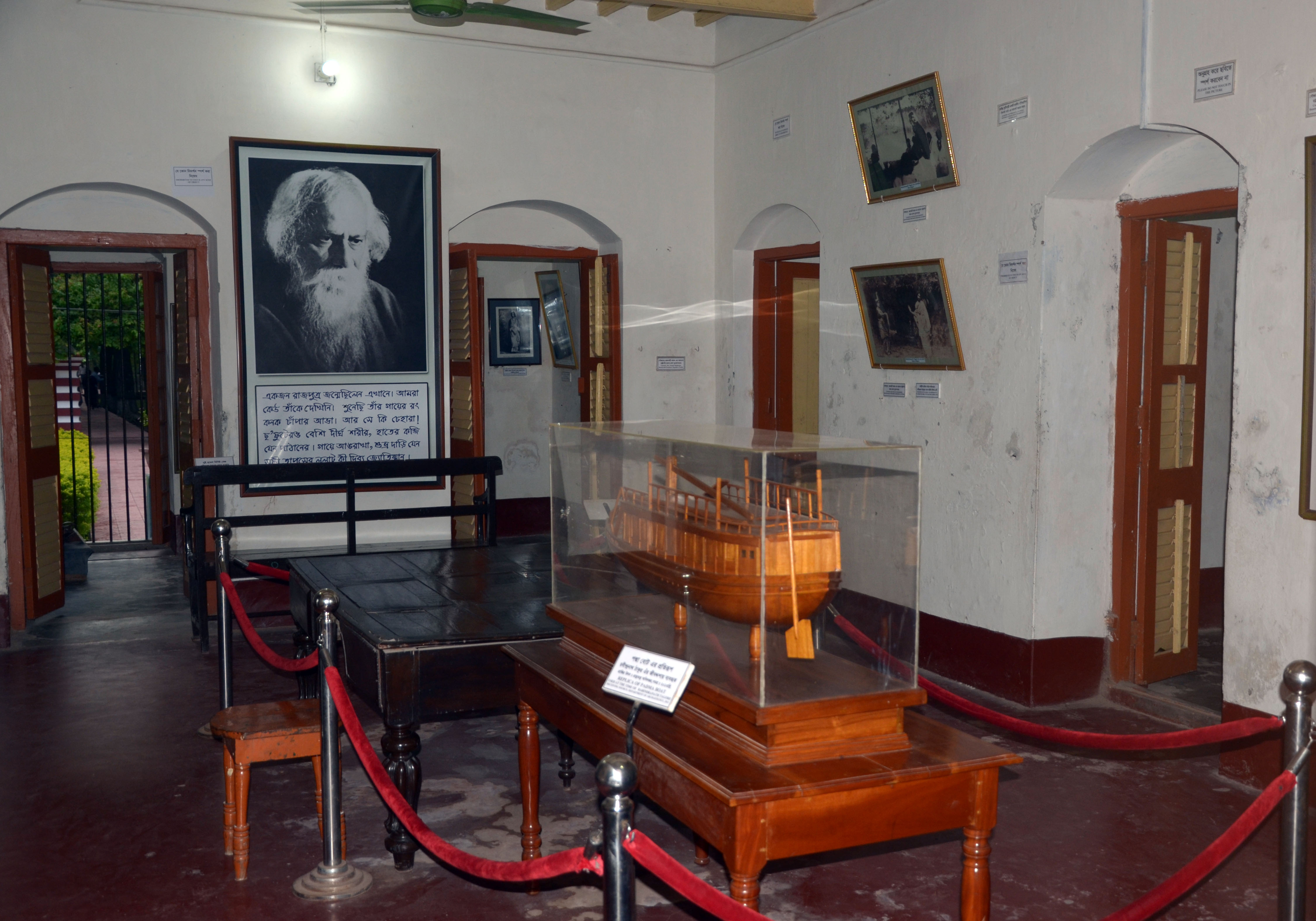
Inside the museum

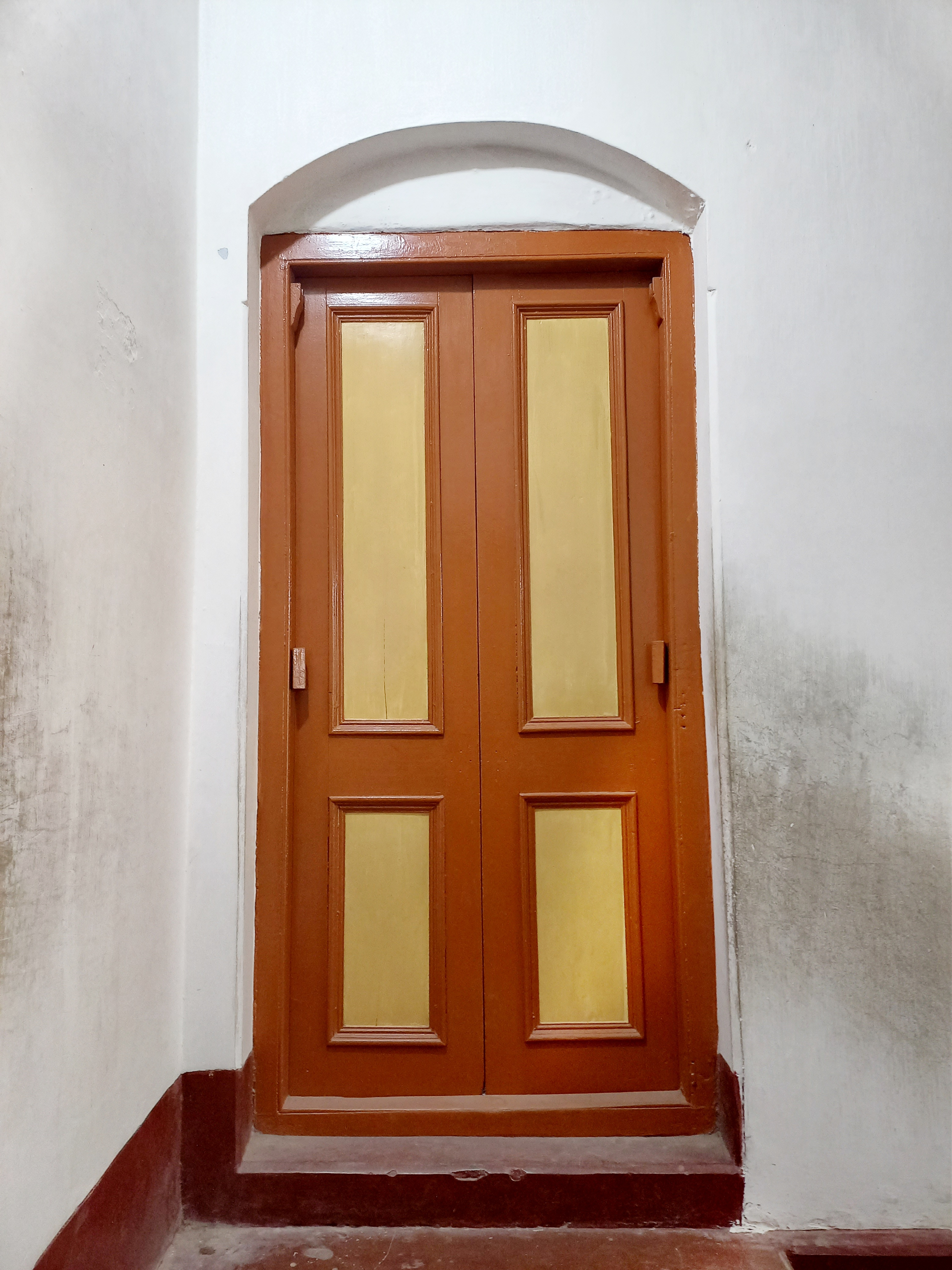
An interior door of Shilaidah Kuthibari

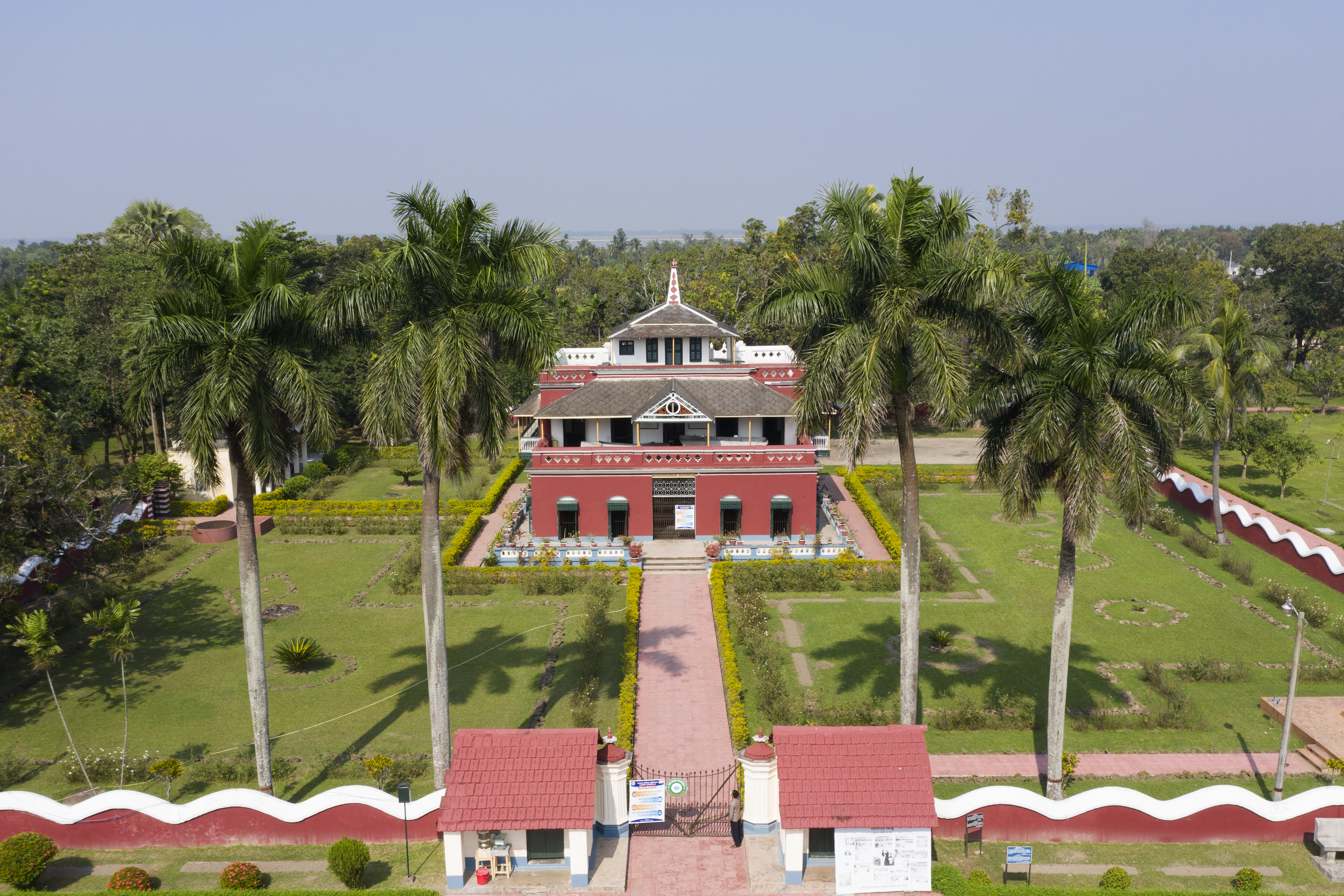
Aerial photograph of Shilaidaha Kuthibari

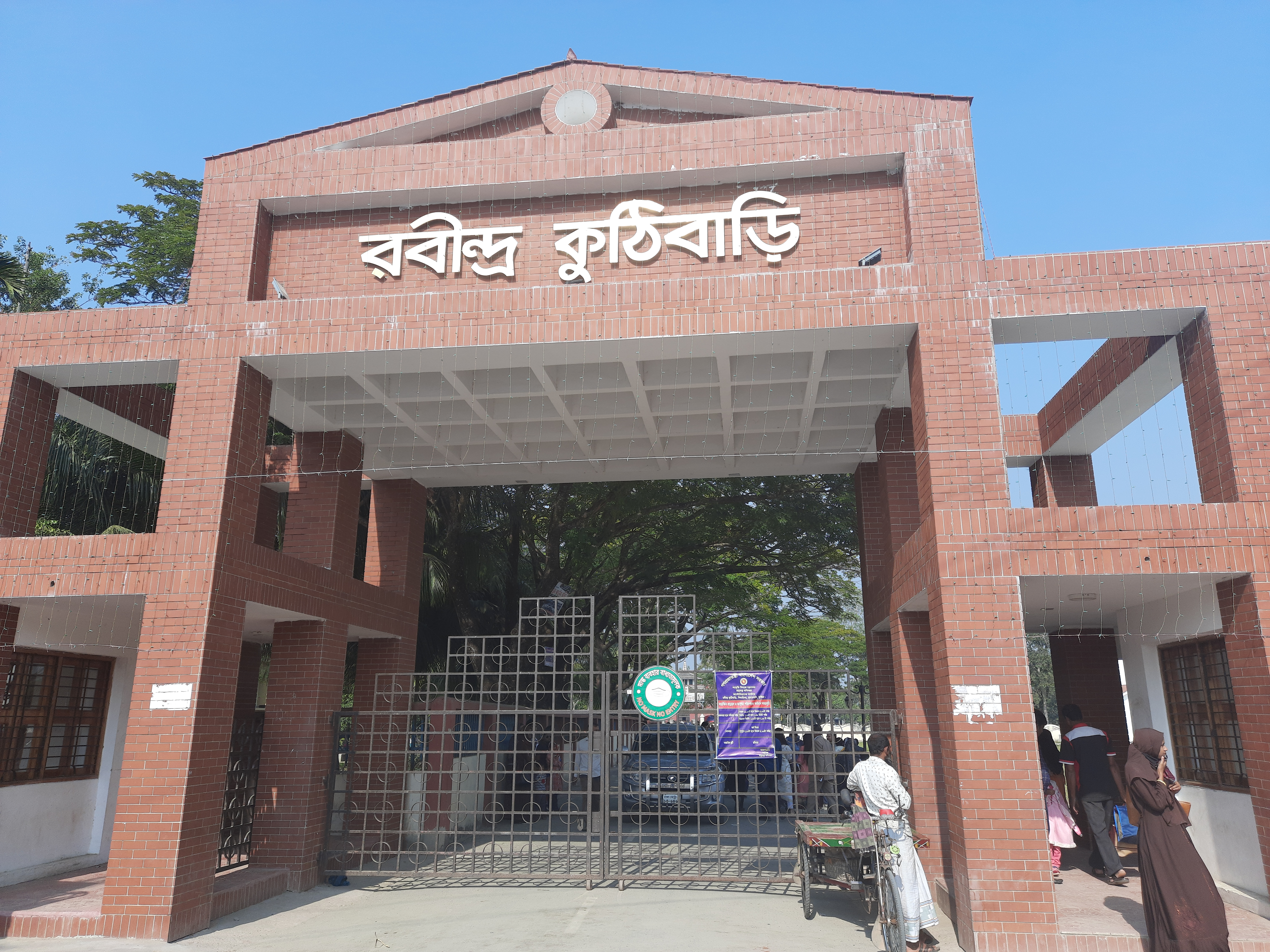
Front gate of Shilaidaha Kuthibari
